= List of Roman nomina =

This is a list of Roman nomina. The nomen identified all free Roman citizens as members of individual gentes, originally families sharing a single nomen and claiming descent from a common ancestor. Over centuries, a gens could expand from a single family to a large clan, potentially including hundreds or even thousands of members. Some of these may have been the descendants of freedmen or persons who entered the gens through adoption, while in other cases, different families that had assumed the same nomen in the distant past became confused with one another, and came to be regarded as a single gens.

In the following list, "I" and "J" are treated as separate letters, as are "U" and "V". The letter "K" was rare in Latin, and the few nomina occasionally spelled with this letter were usually spelled with "C". No Roman gentes began with "X", and the letters "Y" and "Z" occurred only in names borrowed from Greek. The letter "W" did not exist in Classical Latin. Nomina are given in the masculine form—the form borne by all male members of a gens. The gentes themselves were grammatically feminine.

Those nomina representing gentes for which separate articles exist are linked to those articles; those belonging to only one or two individuals, or known from only a few inscriptions, are not usually linked, but may be cited to the literary sources or inscriptions in which they are attested.

== A ==
- Abronius
- Abudius
- Aburius
- Accius
- Accoleius
- Acerronius
- Acilius
- Aconius
- Actorius
- Acutius
- Adginnius
- Aebutius
- Aedinius
- Aelius
- Aemilius
- Aerelius
- Afinius
- Afranius
- Agnanius
- Agorius
- Albanius
- Albatius
- Albinius
- Albius
- Albinovanus
- Albucius
- Alburius
- Alfenus
- Alfius
- Allectius
- Allienus
- Amafinius
- Amatius
- Amblasius
- Ambrosius
- Ampius
- Amplas
- Ampudius
- Amusanus
- Ancarsulenus
- Ancharius
- Andius
- Anicius
- Anisinus
- Anisius
- Annaeus
- Anneius
- Annius
- Anquirinnius
- Antistius
- Antius
- Antonius
- Apisius
- Aponius
- Appianius
- Appius
- Appuleius
- Apronius
- Apustius
- Aquillius
- Aquinius
- Arellius
- Arennius
- Arminius
- Arpineius
- Arrecinus
- Arrius
- Arruntius
- Arsinius
- Articuleius
- Artorius
- Arvenius
- Arvianius
- Asconius
- Asellius
- Asinius
- Asvillius
- Ateius
- Aternius
- Ateronius
- Atius
- Atidius
- Atilius
- Atinius
- Atrius
- Attius
- Atzicius
- Auconius
- Auctorius
- Audasius
- Aufeius
- Aufidius
- Aulius
- Aurelius
- Aurius
- Aurunculeius
- Ausonius
- Autrodius
- Autronius
- Avianus
- Avidius
- Avienus
- Avilius
- Avius
- Axius

== B ==
- Babrius
- Baebius
- Balonius
- Balventius
- Bantius
- Barbatius
- Barrius
- Barsius
- Bavius
- Bellicius
- Bellienus
- Bellius
- Betilienus
- Betutius
- Betuus
- Bicleius
- Blandius
- Blandonius
- Blossius
- Boelius
- Boionius
- Brotius
- Bruttius
- Bucculeius
- Bucius
- Burbuleius
- Burrienus
- Butronius

== C ==
- Caecilius
- Caecina
- Caecius
- Caedicius
- Caelius
- Caeparius
- Caepasius
- Caerellius
- Caesellius
- Caesennius
- Caesetius
- Caesius
- Caesonius
- Caesulenus
- Caetronius
- Calavius
- Calesterna
- Calidius
- Calpurnius
- Calumeius
- Calvenus
- Calventius
- Calvisius
- Camaronius
- Campatius
- Canidius
- Caninius
- Canius
- Cantilius
- Cantius
- Canuleius
- Canutius
- Capienus
- Carfulenus
- Carisius
- Caristanius
- Caristicus
- Carius
- Carpinatius
- Carrinas
- Carsicius
- Carteius
- Carvilius
- Casperius
- Cassius
- Castricius
- Castrucius
- Castrinius
- Catabronius
- Catienus
- Catilius
- Catius
- Caudellius
- Cavinnius
- Ceionius
- Centenius
- Ceppuleius
- Cerenius
- Cervilius
- Cervonius
- Cestius
- Cestronius
- Charapaeus
- Cicereius
- Cilnius
- Cincius
- Cispius
- Classidius
- Claudius
- Cloelius
- Cluentius
- Clutorius
- Cluvius
- Cocceius
- Coelius
- Cominius
- Communius
- Concessius
- Condetius
- Consentius
- Considius
- Consius
- Coponius
- Cordius
- Corfidius
- Cornelius
- Cornificius
- Coruncanius
- Cosconius
- Cossinius
- Cossutius
- Cotius
- Cottius
- Crassicius
- Crastinus
- Cremutius
- Crepereius
- Critonius
- Cupiennius
- Cupronius
- Curiatius
- Curius
- Cursineius
- Curtilius
- Curtius
- Cusinius
- Cuspius

== D ==
- Decidius
- Decimius
- Decitius
- Decius
- Decumenus
- Dellius
- Dercullius
- Desticius
- Dexius
- Didius
- Digitius
- Dillius
- Distubuanus
- Domitius
- Dubius
- Duccius
- Duilius
- Duratenus
- Durmius
- Duronius

== E ==
- Ebetius
- Eggius
- Egilius
- Egnatius
- Egnatuleius
- Egrilius
- Elvius
- Ennius
- Epidius
- Eppius
- Equitius
- Eranius
- Erbonius
- Erucius
- Evasius
- Eveius

== F ==
- Fabius
- Fabricius
- Fadenus
- Fadius
- Faenius
- Falcidius
- Falerius
- Faminius
- Fannius
- Farsuleius
- Faucius
- Favonius
- Festinius
- Fidiculanius
- Firmius
- Flaminius
- Flanus
- Flavinius
- Flavius
- Flavoleius
- Flavonius
- Floridius
- Florius
- Floronius
- Fonteius
- Foslius
- Fufetius
- Fuficius
- Fufidius
- Fufius
- Fulcinius
- Fulginas
- Fulvius
- Fundanius
- Furius
- Furnius

== G ==
- Gabinius
- Gagilius
- Galerius
- Gallius
- Gargonius
- Gavius
- Geganius
- Gellius
- Geminius
- Gennius
- Genucius
- Gessius
- Glicius
- Granius
- Gratidius
- Gratius

== H ==
- Haterius
- Hedusius
- Heius
- Heioleius
- Helvidius
- Helvius
- Herennius
- Herennuleius
- Herminius
- Hippius
- Hirrius
- Hirtius
- Hirtuleius
- Hisseius
- Horatius
- Hordeonius
- Hortensius
- Hosidius
- Hostilius
- Hostius
- Humidius

== I ==
- Iallius
- Iantius
- Iccius
- Icilius
- Ignius
- Ingenius
- Insteius
- Isidius
- Istacidius
- Iteius
- Iturius

== J ==
- Janius
- Javolenus
- Jucundius
- Jugarius
- Julius
- Juncius
- Junetius
- Junius
- Justinius
- Justius
- Justuleius
- Justulenus
- Juventius

== L ==
- Laberius
- Labienus
- Lacerius
- Laecanius
- Laelius
- Laenius
- Laetilius
- Laetorius
- Lafrenius
- Lamponius
- Laronius
- Lartius
- Latinius
- Lavinius
- Lemonius
- Lentidius
- Lepanius
- Lepidius
- Levissatius
- Libellius
- Libertius
- Liburnius
- Licinius
- Ligarius
- Limisius
- Litrius
- Livinius
- Livius
- Lollius
- Longinius
- Loreius
- Lovesius
- Lucceius
- Lucienus
- Lucilius
- Lucius
- Lucretius
- Lurius
- Luscidius
- Luscius
- Lusius
- Lutatius

== M ==
- Maccius
- Maccienus
- Macrinius
- Macrobius
- Maecenas
- Maecilius
- Maecius
- Maelius
- Maenas
- Maenius
- Maevius
- Magius
- Mallius
- Mamercius
- Mamilius
- Manilius
- Manlius
- Mannaius
- Marcius
- Marius
- Martinius
- Maruleius
- Matienus
- Matinius
- Matius
- Matrinius
- Mattavius
- Matuius
- Maximius
- Memmius
- Menenius
- Menius
- Mercatorius
- Mescinius
- Messienus
- Messius
- Mestrius
- Metilius
- Metonius
- Mettius
- Milonius
- Mimesius
- Minatius
- Minicius
- Minidius
- Minius
- Minucius
- Moderatius
- Modius
- Mucimeius
- Mucius
- Multillius
- Mummius
- Munatius
- Munius
- Murrius
- Mussidius
- Mustius
- Mutilius
- Mutius

== N ==
- Naevius
- Nasennius
- Nasidienus
- Nasidius
- Nautius
- Neratius
- Nercius
- Nerfinius
- Nerius
- Nessinius
- Nesulna
- Nigidius
- Nimmius
- Ninnius
- Nipius
- Nonius
- Norbanus
- Novellius
- Novercinius
- Novius
- Numerius
- Numestius
- Numicius
- Numisius
- Numitorius
- Nummius
- Numoleius
- Numonius
- Nunnuleius
- Nymphidius

== O ==
- Obellius
- Obultronius
- Occius
- Oclatinius
- Oclatius
- Oconius
- Ocratius
- Octavenus
- Octavius
- Ofanius
- Ofatulenus
- Ofilius
- Ogulnius
- Ollius
- Opellius
- Opetreius
- Opimius
- Opisius
- Opiternius
- Oppidius
- Oppius
- Opsidius
- Opsilius
- Opsius
- Oranius
- Orbicius
- Orbilius
- Orbius
- Orchius
- Orcivius
- Orfidius
- Orfius
- Orgius
- Orosius
- Oscius
- Ostorius
- Otacilius
- Ovidius
- Ovinius

== P ==
- Paccius
- Paciaecus
- Pacidius
- Pacilius
- Paconius
- Pactumeius
- Pacuvius
- Paldius
- Palfurius
- Palpellius
- Pantuleius
- Papinius
- Papirius
- Papius
- Parmensius
- Parucius
- Pascellius
- Pasidienus
- Pasidius
- Passienus
- Patulcius
- Pedanius
- Pedius
- Peducaeus
- Peltrasius
- Percennius
- Perperna
- Persius
- Pescennius
- Petillius
- Petreius
- Petronius
- Petrosidius
- Peturtius
- Pidius
- Pilius
- Pinarius
- Pinnius
- Pisentius
- Pitisedius
- Placidius
- Plaetorius
- Plaguleius
- Plancius
- Plarius
- Plautius
- Pleminius
- Plinius
- Ploticius
- Pluticius
- Poetelius
- Pollius
- Pomentinus
- Pompeius
- Pompilius
- Pomponius
- Pomptinus
- Pompuledius
- Pontidius
- Pontificius
- Pontilienus
- Pontilius
- Pontius
- Popaedius
- Popidius
- Poppaeus
- Porcius
- Porsina
- Postumius
- Postumulenus
- Potitius
- Praecilius
- Praeconius
- Prastinius
- Precius
- Priscius
- Procilius
- Proculeius
- Propertius
- Publicius
- Puccasius
- Publilius
- Pulfidius
- Pulfionius
- Pupius
- Pusonius

== Q ==
- Quartienus
- Quartinius
- Quartius
- Queresius
- Quinctilius
- Quinctius
- Quinquaius
- Quintinius
- Quirinius

== R ==
- Rabirius
- Rabonius
- Rabuleius
- Racectius
- Racilius
- Raecius
- Ragonius
- Rammius
- Rancius
- Ranius
- Rasinius
- Reconius
- Reginius
- Remmius
- Rennius
- Resius
- Ricinius
- Romanius
- Romilius
- Roscius
- Rubellius
- Rubrenus
- Rubrius
- Rufinius
- Rufius
- Rufrius
- Rullius
- Runnius
- Rupilius
- Rusonius
- Rusticelius
- Rustius
- Rutilius

== S ==
- Sabellius
- Sabidius
- Sabinius
- Sabucius
- Sacratorius
- Saenius
- Saevonius
- Safinius
- Sagarius
- Salienus
- Sallustius
- Salonius
- Saltius
- Saltorius
- Salvidienus
- Salvidius
- Salvius
- Salvienus
- Samacius
- Samiantus
- Samilaris
- Sammius
- Sanquinius
- Sariolenus
- Sarius
- Sarrenius
- Satellius
- Satrienus
- Satrius
- Sattius
- Saturius
- Saturninius
- Saufeius
- Scaevilius
- Scaevinius
- Scaevius
- Scalacius
- Scandilius
- Scantinius
- Scantius
- Scaptius
- Scatidius
- Scetanus
- Scoedius
- Scribonius
- Scuilius
- Scutarius
- Seccius
- Secundinius
- Secundius
- Sedatius
- Segulius
- Seius
- Selicius
- Sellius
- Sempronius
- Sennius
- Sentius
- Seppienus
- Seppius
- Sepstinius
- Septicius
- Septimius
- Septimuleius
- Septueius
- Sepullius
- Sepunius
- Sergius
- Serius
- Sertorius
- Servaeus
- Servenius
- Servilius
- Servius
- Sestius
- Severius
- Sextilius
- Sextius
- Sibidienus
- Sicinius
- Signinus
- Silicius
- Silius
- Silvius
- Simplicius
- Simplicinius
- Sinicius
- Sinnius
- Sinuleius
- Sisenna
- Sittius
- Socellius
- Sollius
- Sornatius
- Sosius
- Sotidius
- Spedioleius
- Spedius
- Spellius
- Splattius
- Spurilius
- Spurinna
- Spurius
- Staberius
- Staius
- Stallius
- Statilius
- Statinius
- Statioleius
- Statius
- Statorius
- Statrius
- Steius
- Stellius
- Stenius
- Stertinius
- Stlabillenus
- Stlaccius
- Stlammius
- Stlarius
- Strabonius
- Subrius
- Successius
- Suedius
- Suellius
- Suetonius
- Suettius
- Suilius or Suillius
- Sulpicius
- Summianius
- Surdinius

== T ==
- Tadius
- Talepius
- Talius
- Tampius
- Tanicius
- Tannonius
- Tanusius
- Tapsenna
- Tariolenus
- Taronius
- Tarpeius
- Tarquinius
- Tarquitius
- Tarrutenius
- Tarutius
- Tatius
- Tattius
- Taurius
- Tebanus
- Tecusenus
- Tedisenus
- Teditius
- Tedius
- Teiustius
- Terefrius
- Terrasidius
- Terentilius
- Terentius
- Tertinius
- Tertius
- Tesitanus
- Tetricius
- Tetrinius
- Tettidius
- Tettienus
- Tettius
- Thoranius
- Thorius
- Tiburtius
- Ticinius
- Tifernius
- Tigellius
- Tigidius
- Tilioficiosus
- Tillius
- Tineius
- Titanius
- Titedius
- Titinius
- Titioleius
- Titius
- Tittidienus
- Tittienus
- Tittius
- Titucius
- Tituculenus
- Titulenus
- Titurius
- Titurnius
- Togonius
- Tolumnius
- Traius
- Tranquillius
- Traulus
- Trausius
- Travinius
- Travius
- Trebanius
- Trebatius
- Trebellienus
- Trebellius
- Trebicius
- Trebius
- Trebulanus
- Trebonius
- Tremellius
- Triarius
- Triccius
- Trisimpedius
- Tritius
- Trutelius
- Truttedius
- Trutteius
- Tuccius
- Tudicius
- Tullius
- Turallasius
- Turciacus
- Turcilius
- Turbonius
- Turcius
- Turionius
- Turius
- Turpilius
- Turranius
- Turselius
- Tursidius
- Turullius
- Tuscenius
- Tuscilius
- Tussanius
- Tussidius
- Tuticanus
- Tuticius
- Tutilius
- Tutinius
- Tutius
- Tutorius

== U ==
- Ulcidius
- Ulentinius
- Ulpius
- Umberius
- Umbilius
- Umbirius
- Umboleius
- Umbonius
- Umbrenus
- Umbricius
- Umbrius
- Umbrilius
- Umerius
- Ummidius
- Urbanius
- Urbicius
- Urbinius
- Urgulanius
- Urinaeus
- Urseius
- Urvinius
- Usius
- Ussinus
- Utianus
- Utilius
- Uttiedius

== V ==
- Valerius
- Valentius
- Valgius
- Vallius
- Vannius
- Varenus
- Vargunteius
- Varinius
- Varisidius
- Varius
- Varrotius
- Varveratius
- Vasius
- Vatinius
- Vatronius
- Vecilius
- Vedius
- Vedodius
- Vegetius
- Velanius
- Velius
- Velleius
- Vemnasius
- Ventidius
- Venuleius
- Vequasius
- Veranius
- Verbisius
- Verecundius
- Vergilius
- Verginius
- Verres
- Verrius
- Vesiculanus
- Vesnius
- Vesonius
- Vespasius
- Vestius
- Vestorius
- Vestricius
- Vestrius
- Vesuccius
- Vetilius
- Vettius
- Veturius
- Vibenius
- Vibidius
- Vibius
- Vibulliacus
- Vibullius
- Vicirius
- Victorinius
- Victorius
- Victricius
- Viducius
- Vigilius
- Villius
- Vinicius
- Vinius
- Vipsanius
- Vipstanus
- Viridius
- Virius
- Visellius
- Vistilius
- Vitellius
- Vitedius
- Vitrasius
- Vitruvius
- Vivanius
- Voconius
- Volcacius
- Volnius
- Volscius
- Volturcius
- Volumnius
- Volusenna
- Volusenus
- Volusius
- Vorenius
- Vulius
- Vulpius

== Z ==
- Zazgius
- Zebucius

== See also ==
- List of Roman gentes
- Roman naming conventions
- Praenomen
- List of Roman cognomina

== Bibliography ==
- Marcus Tullius Cicero, Epistulae ad Atticum (Letters to Atticus).
- Gaius Julius Caesar, Commentarii de Bello Gallico (Commentaries on the Gallic War); De Bello Africo (On the African War, attributed).
- Aulus Hirtius, De Bello Alexandrino (On the Alexandrine War).
- Marcus Terentius Varro, De Lingua Latina (On the Latin Language).
- Titus Livius (Livy), History of Rome.
- Publius Cornelius Tacitus, Annales.
- Theodor Mommsen et alii, Corpus Inscriptionum Latinarum (The Body of Latin Inscriptions, abbreviated CIL), Berlin-Brandenburgische Akademie der Wissenschaften (1853–present).
- Notizie degli Scavi di Antichità (News of Excavations from Antiquity, abbreviated NSA), Accademia dei Lincei (1876–present).
- Bulletin Archéologique du Comité des Travaux Historiques et Scientifiques (Archaeological Bulletin of the Committee on Historic and Scientific Works, abbreviated BCTH), Imprimerie Nationale, Paris (1885–1973).
- René Cagnat et alii, L'Année épigraphique (The Year in Epigraphy, abbreviated AE), Presses Universitaires de France (1888–present).
- Stéphane Gsell, Inscriptions Latines de L'Algérie (Latin Inscriptions from Algeria), Edouard Champion, Paris (1922–present).
- Hermann Finke, "Neue Inschriften", in Berichte der Römisch-Germanischen Kommission, vol. xvii, pp. 1–107, 198–231 (1927).
- Epigraphica, Rivista Italiana di Epigrafia (1939–present).
- Anna and Jaroslav Šašel, Inscriptiones Latinae quae in Iugoslavia inter annos MCMXL et MCMLX repertae et editae sunt (Inscriptions from Yugoslavia Found and Published between 1940 and 1960), Ljubljana (1963–1986).
- Iiro Kajanto, "The Significance of Non-Latin Cognomina", in Latomus, vol. 73, No. 3 (1968).
- Heikki Solin, "Die Wandinschriften im sog(enannten) Haus des M. Fabius Rufus", in Neue Forschungen in Pompeji, B. Andreae, H. Kyrieleis, eds. Recklinghausen, pp. 243–272 (1975).
- Gerold Walser, Römische Inschriften in der Schweiz (Roman Inscriptions of Switzerland), Haupt, Bern (1979–present).
- Hispania Epigraphica (Epigraphy of Spain), Madrid (1989–present).
- The Roman Inscriptions of Britain (abbreviated RIB), Oxford, (1990–present).
- Giovanni Battista Brusin, Inscriptiones Aquileiae (Inscriptions of Aquileia), Udine (1991–1993).
- M. Khanoussi, L. Maurin, Mourir à Dougga: Receuil des inscriptions funéraires (Dying in Dougga: a Compendium of Funerary Inscriptions, abbreviated MAD), Bordeaux, Tunis (2002).
- Teramo e la valle del Tordino, Documenti dell'Abruzzo Teramano, Band 7, Part 1, Teramo (2006).
- Anne Kolb, Tituli Helvetici: Die römischen Inschriften der West- und Ostschweiz (Helvetian Tablets: The Roman Inscriptions of West and East Switzerland), Rudolf Habelt, Bonn (2022).
- Manfred Clauss, Anne Kolb, & Wolfgang A. Slaby, Epigraphik Datenbank Clauss/Slaby (abbreviated EDCS).
