= Tutinia gens =

Ancient Roman family

The gens Tutinia was an obscure plebeian family of imperial times at ancient Rome. No members of this gens are mentioned by Roman writers, but several are known from inscriptions.

== Origin ==
The nomen Tutinius belongs to a class of gentilicia originally formed from cognomina ending in -inus. The derivative suffix -inius then came to be used to form new nomina from existing gentilicia. Tutinius seems to have been formed from a nomen such as Tutius, which was probably derived either from the Latin tutus, "safe", or perhaps from the Oscan touto, a people.

== Members ==
This list includes abbreviated praenomina. For an explanation of this practice, see filiation.

- Tutinia Q. l. Auge, a freedwoman at Rome in the early first century.
- Tiberius Tutinius Severus, one of the Arval Brethren, and magister of the college between AD 84 and 90, in the time of Domitian.
- Tiberius Tutinius Sentius Satrinus, master of a potter's workshop at Rome dating from AD 126, in the time of Hadrian. He was certainly related to the priest Tiberius Tutinius Severus, perhaps his son.
- Gaius Tutinius Justinus, a native of Blera in Latium, was a soldier in the fifth cohort of the praetorian guard at Rome in AD 144, serving in the century of Firmus.
- Tutinia Charite, together with Tiberius Tutinius, built a second-century family sepulchre at Rome for themselves and Tutinius Felicissimus.
- Tutinius Felicissimus, buried in a second-century family sepulchre at Rome, built by Tiberius Tutinius and Tutinia Charite.
- Tiberius Tutinius, a verna, or home-born slave, (Note: As he has a nomen gentilicium, he must have been a freedman. The form of the inscription suggests that Tutinia was his wife, and Felicissimus their son, but no relationships are stated.) together with Tutinia Charite, built a second-century family sepulchre for themselves and Tutinius Felicissimus.
- Tutinia, the daughter of Rufus, and wife of Publius Caetronius Verecundus, one of the quattuorviri jure dicundo, who built a family sepulchre at the site of modern Lonigo, formerly part of Venetia and Histria, for himself, his wife, their sons, Publius Caetronius and Gaius Caetronius Exoratus, and their wives, Dellia Secunda and Ducellia Sabina.

== See also ==
- List of Roman gentes

== Bibliography ==
- Theodor Mommsen et alii, Corpus Inscriptionum Latinarum (The Body of Latin Inscriptions, abbreviated CIL), Berlin-Brandenburgische Akademie der Wissenschaften (1853–present).
- Notizie degli Scavi di Antichità (News of Excavations from Antiquity, abbreviated NSA), Accademia dei Lincei (1876–present).
- George Davis Chase, "The Origin of Roman Praenomina", in Harvard Studies in Classical Philology, vol. VIII, pp. 103–184 (1897).
- Paul von Rohden, Elimar Klebs, & Hermann Dessau, Prosopographia Imperii Romani (The Prosopography of the Roman Empire, abbreviated PIR), Berlin (1898).
- Herbert Bloch, "The Roman Brick-stamps Not Published in Volume XV 1 of Corpus Inscriptionum Latinarum" in Harvard Studies in Classical Philology, vols. LVI, LVII (1947).
