= Tudicia gens =

Ancient Roman family

The gens Tudicia was an obscure plebeian family at ancient Rome. No members of this gens are mentioned by Roman writers, but several are known from inscriptions.

== Origin ==
The nomen Tudicius belongs to a class of gentilicia originally formed from cognomina ending in -ex and -icis. The suffix -icius later came to be regarded as a regular gentile-forming suffix, and was applied to form nomina from names with varying roots.

== Praenomina ==
The main praenomina of the Tudicii were Gnaeus, Lucius, Marcus, and Publius. From a filiation, they also appear to have used Gaius.

== Members ==
This list includes abbreviated praenomina. For an explanation of this practice, see filiation.

- Lucius Tudicius C. f., named in an inscription from Aquileia in Venetia and Histria, dating from the latter half of the first century BC, along with Baebia Frema, perhaps his wife, Secunda and Lucius Tudicius Cervolis, perhaps his children, the freedman Marcus Flavidius Philogenes, and the freedwoman Egnatia Amoena.
- Secunda (Tudicia), named in an inscription from Aquileia, dating from the latter half of the first century BC, along with Lucius Tudicius and Baebia Frema, perhaps her parents, Lucius Tudicius Cervolis, perhaps her brother, and two freedmen.
- Lucius Tudicius L. f. (C. n.) Cervolis, named in an inscription from Aquileia, dating from the latter half of the first century BC, along with Lucius Tudicius and Baebia Frema, perhaps his parents, Secunda, perhaps his sister, and two freedmen.
- Marcus Tudicius M. f. Niger, a native of Rome, was a soldier in the Legio V. (Note: Which fifth legion is not specified in the inscription, but likely the Legio V Macedonica, as the Legio V Alaudae was stationed in or near Germania during the Augustan period.) He built an Augustan-era tomb at Ateste in Venetia and Histria for himself and his wife, the freedwoman Grania Aphrodisia.
- Tudicia Clemens, buried at Rome, aged twenty-two, in a tomb dating from the first half of the first century, along with Gnaeus Tudicius Salvius, perhaps her freedman.
- Gnaeus Tudicius Cn. l. Mario, a freedman named along with Trebonia Zosime, perhaps his wife, in a sepulchral inscription from Rome dating from the first half of the first century.
- Gnaeus Tudicius Salvius, a freedman buried at Rome, in a tomb dating from the first half of the first century, along with Tudicia Clemens, (Note: According to his filiation, Salvius was Tudiciae libertus, freedman of Tudicia, rather than "Ɔ. l.", or mulieris libertus, freedman of a woman (who would probably still have been named "Tudicia", given his nomen), so the fact that he was buried alongside a Tudicia whose name suggests that she was not a freedwoman, and whose relationship to him is not stated, seems to indicate that she was the Tudicia named in Salvius' filiation.) perhaps his former mistress.

=== Undated Tudicii ===
- Tudicia, dedicated a tomb at Rome for her patron, Gnaeus Tudicius.
- Gnaeus Tudicius, buried at Rome, with a tomb dedicated by his client, Tudicia.
- Gnaeus Tudicius Amandus, buried at Rome, aged twenty-four.
- Publius Tudicius L. f., built a tomb at Ateste for his wife, Geminia Secunda.
- Tudicia P. l. Felix, a freedwoman named in a sepulchral inscription from Rome.
- Publius Tudicius Felix, (Note: Spelled Felixs in the original inscription.) built a tomb at Rome for his wife, Primigenia.
- Marcus Tudicius P. f. Marcellus, buried at Ateste, in a tomb built by his wife, Barbia Secunda.
- Tudicia Nigella, named in a sepulchral inscription from Rome.
- Gnaeus Tudicius Ɔ. l. Philostergus, a freedman named in a sepulchral inscription from Rome.

== See also ==
- List of Roman gentes

== Bibliography ==
- Theodor Mommsen et alii, Corpus Inscriptionum Latinarum (The Body of Latin Inscriptions, abbreviated CIL), Berlin-Brandenburgische Akademie der Wissenschaften (1853–present).
- George Davis Chase, "The Origin of Roman Praenomina", in Harvard Studies in Classical Philology, vol. VIII, pp. 103–184 (1897).
- Antonio Ferrua, "Nuove Iscrizioni della Via Ostiense" (New Inscriptions from the Via Ostiensis), in Epigraphica, No. 21, pp. 97–116 (1959).
