= Seppiena gens =

Ancient Roman family

The gens Seppiena was an obscure plebeian family at ancient Rome. None of the Seppieni are mentioned in ancient writers, but several members of this gens are known from inscriptions.

== Origin ==
The nomen Seppienus seems to be derived from the same root as that of the Seppia gens, and is thus a patronymic surname derived from the Oscan or Umbrian praenomen Seppius. That name is cognate with the rare Latin praenomen Septimus, and its more common derivative, the nomen Septimius. The root of all these names is the numeral seven, which in the earliest period would have been given either to a seventh child or seventh son, or to a child born in the month of September, originally the seventh month of the Roman calendar. Chase notes that the gentile-forming suffix -enus was typical of Picenum and adjacent regions, and although the majority of the small number of Seppieni found in inscriptions appear to have been colonials, there are examples from Umbria and neighbouring Cisalpine Gaul, suggesting that the family was most likely of Umbrian origin.

== Members ==
This list includes abbreviated praenomina. For an explanation of this practice, see filiation.

- Seppienus, a centurion, and the commander of Lucius Voconius Proculus, a scout buried at Rome in the last part of the first century, or the early part of the second.
- Publius Seppienus P. f. Aelianus, a soldier mentioned in an inscription from the present site of Botew in Bulgaria, formerly part of Moesia Inferior, dating from AD 78.
- Marcus Seppienus M. f. Aurio, a boy buried at Salona in Dalmatia, aged nine, with a monument from his father, Marcus Seppienus Eutychus, dating between AD 150 and 300.
- Lucius Seppienus Bithus, together with his little girl, Epidia Procula, dedicated a monument at Rome to his wife, Epidia Gnome, aged twenty-four.
- Marcus Seppienus Eutychus, dedicated a second- or third-century tomb at Salona to his son, Marcus Seppienus Aurio.
- Seppiena Lais, buried in a first-century tomb at Thermae Himeraeae in Sicily.
- Seppiena Nike, dedicated a tomb at Salona to her son, Eutyches, dating between AD 150 and 300.
- Seppiena Philomena, buried at Salona in a tomb built by her mother, Seppiena Restituta, and dating to the first century, or the first half of the second.
- Seppiena Q. f. Polla, named in an inscription from Brixellum in Cisalpine Gaul.
- Seppiena Prima, the wife of Gaius Caesius Pantheris, and mother of Gaius Caesius Vitulus, who donated a pot in memory of his parents at Mons Feretur, near Callium in Umbria.
- Seppiena Restituta, a freedwoman who built a first- or second-century tomb at Salona for her daughter, Seppiena Philomena.

== See also ==
- List of Roman gentes

== Bibliography ==
- Theodor Mommsen et alii, Corpus Inscriptionum Latinarum (The Body of Latin Inscriptions, abbreviated CIL), Berlin-Brandenburgische Akademie der Wissenschaften (1853–present).
- René Cagnat et alii, L'Année épigraphique (The Year in Epigraphy, abbreviated AE), Presses Universitaires de France (1888–present).
- George Davis Chase, "The Origin of Roman Praenomina", in Harvard Studies in Classical Philology, vol. VIII, pp. 103–184 (1897).
- Hans Petersen, "The Numeral Praenomina of the Romans", in Transactions of the American Philological Association, vol. xciii, pp. 347–354 (1962).
- Anna and Jaroslav Šašel, Inscriptiones Latinae quae in Iugoslavia inter annos MCMXL et MCMLX repertae et editae sunt (Inscriptions from Yugoslavia Found and Published between 1940 and 1960, abbreviated ILJug), Ljubljana (1963–1986).
