= Anquirinnia gens =

Ancient Roman family

The gens Anquirinnia was an obscure plebeian family at ancient Rome. No members of this gens are mentioned in history, but several are known from inscriptions.

== Origin ==
The only inscriptions of the Anquirinni place them in the neighborhood of Pisae in Etruria, suggesting that they were of Etruscan origin. nomina ending in -inius frequently arose from other gentilicia, of which a number are known to have been of Etruscan origin. This may indicate that the nomen was originally Anquirinna, with the typical Etruscan ending -inna.

== Praenomina ==
From the scant epigraphic record, it seems that Quintus was likely the chief praenomen of the Anquirinni, although the same inscriptions also indicate that they used Lucius, Sextus, and Titus. All of these names were common throughout Roman history.

== Branches and cognomina ==
The only cognomina known from this family are Secundus and Severus, both common surnames throughout most of Roman history. Secundus, meaning "second", is part of a class of names indicating the relation or character of the bearer, and might have been bestowed upon a second child or second son, or to distinguish the bearer from a father of the same name. Severus, "severe", belongs to a class of surnames derived from the bearer's traits, and would originally have indicated someone known for his stern manner or expression.

== Members ==
This list includes abbreviated praenomina. For an explanation of this practice, see filiation.

- Sextus Anquirinnius L. f., formerly a soldier in the Nineteenth legion, commemorated by a monument at Portus Pisanus in Etruria, inscribed from the proceeds of a legacy left to Quintus and Titus Anquirinnius.
- Quintus Anquirinnius, along with Titus Anquirinnius, placed a monument at Portus Pisanus in memory of Sextus Anquirinnius, perhaps their brother or father.
- Titus Anquirinnius, along with Quintus Anquirinnius, placed a monument at Portus Pisanus in memory of Sextus Anquirinnius, perhaps their brother or father.
- Quintus Anquirinnius Secundus, along with his wife, Occia Agile, built a tomb at Pisae in Etruria, dating from the first half of the first century, for Quintus Anquirinnius Severus, probably their son.
- Quintus Anquirinnius Q. f. Severus, one of the seviri Augustales, buried at Pisae, in a tomb built by Quintus Anquirinnius Secundus and his wife, Occia Agile, likely Severus' parents, dating from the first half of the first century.

== See also ==
- List of Roman gentes

== Bibliography ==
- Theodor Mommsen et alii, Corpus Inscriptionum Latinarum (The Body of Latin Inscriptions, abbreviated CIL), Berlin-Brandenburgische Akademie der Wissenschaften (1853–present).
- George Davis Chase, "The Origin of Roman Praenomina", in Harvard Studies in Classical Philology, vol. VIII, pp. 103–184 (1897).
- Harper's Dictionary of Classical Literature and Antiquities, Harry Thurston Peck, ed. (Second Edition, 1897).
- Inscriptiones Italiae (Inscriptions from Italy), Rome (1931-present).
