= Pontiliena gens =

Ancient Roman family

The gens Pontiliena was an obscure plebeian family at ancient Rome. No members of this gens appear in history, but a few are mentioned in inscriptions.

== Origin ==
The nomen Pontilienus appears to be formed from Pontilius, another nomen gentilicium. The philologist George Davis Chase describes a class of such nomina, ending in -enus and nearly always derived from other gentile names, rather than places. The root of the name appears to be the Oscan praenomen Pompo or Pomptus, a cognate of the Latin praenomen Quintus. Thus, Pontilienus and similar nomina, such as Pompilius and Pomponia are the Oscan equivalents of Latin names such as Quinctius and Quinctilius.

== Members ==
This list includes abbreviated praenomina. For an explanation of this practice, see filiation.

- Gaius Pontilienus M. f., named in an inscription from Volubilis in Mauretania Tingitana.
- Gaius Pontilienus M. f., named in several inscriptions from Mal di Ventre in Sardinia.
- Gaius Pontilienus M. f., named in an inscription from Carthago Nova in Hispania Citerior.
- Marcus Pontilienus M. f., named in several inscriptions from Mal di Ventre, and one from Capo Carbonara in Sardinia.

== See also ==
- List of Roman gentes

== Bibliography ==
- Wilhelm Henzen, Ephemeris Epigraphica: Corporis Inscriptionum Latinarum Supplementum (Journal of Inscriptions: Supplement to the Corpus Inscriptionum Latinarum, abbreviated EE), Institute of Roman Archaeology, Rome (1872–1913).
- René Cagnat et alii, L'Année épigraphique (The Year in Epigraphy, abbreviated AE), Presses Universitaires de France (1888–present).
