= Justuleia gens =

Ancient Roman family

The gens Justuleia was an obscure plebeian family of ancient Rome. No members of this gens are mentioned by Roman writers, but a number are known from epigraphy.

== Origin ==
The nomen Justuleius belongs to a large class of gentilicia formed using the suffix -eius, typical of those formed from stems ending in -a or -as, which were frequent in the Oscan and Faliscan languages. Over time, -eius came to be seen as a regular gentile-forming suffix, applied to other stems. Most of the inscriptions mentioning Justuleii come from Latium.

== Members ==
This list includes abbreviated praenomina. For an explanation of this practice, see filiation.

- Gaius Justuleius C. l. Alexander, a freedman named along with the freedman Marcus Publicius Apollonius, in an inscription from Rome dating from the middle portion of the first century BC.
- Lucius Justuleius L. l. D[...]us[...]o, a freedman named in a first-century inscription from Rome, along with Lucius Justuleius Seleucus. The former's age, now lost, was recorded, implying that at least he was dead.
- Lucius Justuleius P. l. Seleucus, a freedman named in a first-century inscription from Rome, along with Lucius Justuleius D[...]us[...]o, apparently deceased.
- Aulus Justuleius, built a middle to late first-century tomb at Puteoli in Campania for his daughter, Justuleia Vera.
- Justuleia A. f. Vera, buried at Puteoli in Campania in a middle to late first-century tomb built by her father, Aulus Justuleius.
- Justuleia Priscilla, built a tomb at Castrimoenium in Latium, dating between the middle of the first and the middle of the second century, for her son, Marcus Laevius Severus, and her husband, Marcus Laevius Martialis.
- Aulus Justuleius Balbus, one of the municipal duumvirs at Sora in Latium in AD 83. He may be the same as the person of that name mentioned in an inscription dating from 106, found at the site of modern Rocca d'Arce. An Aulus Justuleius Saturninus is mentioned in the same inscription.
- Aulus Justuleius Saturninus, one of the curatores at Sora in AD 83, mentioned in the same inscription with the duumvir Aulus Justuleius Balbus.
- Gaius Justuleius Crescens, a native of Tarracina in Latium, was an evocatus, or veteran soldier, serving in the century of Verus in the second cohort of the praetorian guard at Rome in AD 143.
- Justuleius Felix, one of the magistrates of the collegium fabrum at Rome, according to an inscription of the early fourth century.

== See also ==
- List of Roman gentes

== Bibliography ==
- René Cagnat et alii, L'Année épigraphique (The Year in Epigraphy, abbreviated AE), Presses Universitaires de France (1888–present).
- George Davis Chase, "The Origin of Roman Praenomina", in Harvard Studies in Classical Philology, vol. VIII, pp. 103–184 (1897).
- Wilhelm Henzen, Ephemeris Epigraphica: Corporis Inscriptionum Latinarum Supplementum (Journal of Inscriptions: Supplement to the Corpus Inscriptionum Latinarum, abbreviated EE), Institute of Roman Archaeology, Rome (1872–1913).
- Theodor Mommsen et alii, Corpus Inscriptionum Latinarum (The Body of Latin Inscriptions, abbreviated CIL), Berlin-Brandenburgische Akademie der Wissenschaften (1853–present).
