= Tuticia gens =

Ancient Roman family

The gens Tuticia was an obscure plebeian family of imperial times at ancient Rome. No members of this gens are mentioned by Roman writers, but several are known from inscriptions.

== Origin ==
The nomen Tuticius belongs to a class of gentilicia originally formed from cognomina ending in -ex and -icis. As these became widespread, -icius came to be regarded as a regular gentile-forming suffix, which was used to form gentilicia from other nomina. Tuticius might have been formed in this manner from the existing nomen Tutius, an Oscan or Latin name perhaps derived from the Oscan word touto, a people, or Latin tutus, "safe".

== Members ==
This list includes abbreviated praenomina. For an explanation of this practice, see filiation.

- Tuticius Hylas, left ten thousand sestertii for the Roman treasury, according to a second- or early third-century sepulchral inscription from Rome.
- Tuticia Caenis, buried at Rome along with her daughter, Longinia Celerina, and the freedman Longinius Basilus, in a second- or third-century family sepulchre built by her husband, Gaius Longinius Celer.
- Tuticia Adrastilla, buried at Apulum in Dacia, aged eighteen years, two months, and twenty days, in a tomb dating between the middle portion of the second century and the middle part of the third, dedicated by her daughter, Tuticia Victoria.
- Tuticia Victoria, dedicated a second- or third-century tomb at Apulum for her mother, Tuticia Adrastilla.
- Marcus Tuticius Felix, together with his wife, Galatia, built a family sepulchre at Rome, dating from the latter half of the second century, for themselves and their descendants.
- Tuticius Trophimus, buried at Rome, along with Julia Felicitas, aged fifteen, at Aquileia in Venetia and Histria, in a tomb dating from the late second or early third century.

=== Undated Tuticii ===
- Marcus Tuticius Capito, named on a lead pipe found at Rome.
- Tuticius M[...], named in an inscription from Leptis Magna in Africa Proconsularis.
- Marcus Tuticius Proculus, procurator Augusti in the province of Africa, made an offering to Hercules at Sicca Veneria.
- Tuticia Trophime, buried at Rome, in a tomb dedicated by her husband, whose name has not been preserved.

== See also ==
- List of Roman gentes

== Bibliography ==
- Theodor Mommsen et alii, Corpus Inscriptionum Latinarum (The Body of Latin Inscriptions, abbreviated CIL), Berlin-Brandenburgische Akademie der Wissenschaften (1853–present).
- George Davis Chase, "The Origin of Roman Praenomina", in Harvard Studies in Classical Philology, vol. VIII, pp. 103–184 (1897).
- Paul von Rohden, Elimar Klebs, & Hermann Dessau, Prosopographia Imperii Romani (The Prosopography of the Roman Empire, abbreviated PIR), Berlin (1898).
- Joyce M. Reynolds, J. B. Ward-Perkins, The Inscriptions of Roman Tripolitania, British School at Rome (1952).
- Giovanni Battista Brusin, Inscriptiones Aquileiae (Inscriptions of Aquileia), Udine (1991–1993).
