= Tebana gens =

Ancient Roman family

The gens Tebana was an obscure plebeian family at ancient Rome. Although no members of this gens are mentioned in history, they appear in inscriptions beginning in the early part of the first century. Publius Tebanus Gavidius Latiaris obtained the praetorship under the emperor Claudius.

== Origin ==
The nomen Tebanus belongs to a class of gentilicia formed using either the derivative suffix -anus, or the adjectival form -anius, although the form Tebanius is not found in inscriptions. These nomina were frequently derived from the names of towns, although they could also be based on other gentilicia or cognomina. The Tebani were probably of Samnite origin, as all of the inscriptions of this gens not from Rome are from towns in Samnium.

== Praenomina ==
Most of the Tebani known from epigraphy bore the praenomen Publius, although one early inscription shows that this gens also used Gaius and Titus.

== Members ==
This list includes abbreviated praenomina. For an explanation of this practice, see filiation.

- Tebana P. l. Hamilla, a freedwoman, dedicated a tomb at Rome, dating from the first half of the first century, for her husband, Gaius Lusius Bucolus, aged eighteen years, three months, and ten days.
- Titus Tebanus C. f. Ja[...], buried in a first-century tomb at Furfo in Samnium.
- Publius Tebanus St[...], a nomenclator, a type of secretary responsible for keeping track of clients or slaves, named in a first-century inscription from Rome.
- Publius Tebanus P. f., one of the decemviri stlitibus judicandis, mentioned in an inscription found at the site of modern Barete, formerly part of Samnium, and dating from the reign of Nero. He might be the same person as Publius Tebanus Gavidius Latiaris.
- Publius Tebanus P. f. Gavidius Latiaris, had served as quaestor, tribune of the plebs, and praetor under Claudius. His career was commemorated in an inscription from Aveia in Samnium, dating between the death of Claudius and the end of the first century.
- Publius Tebanus Restitutus, together with Pompeia Tyche, dedicated a second-century tomb at Rome for his colleague, Titus Flavius Aprilis.
- Tebana Amanda, dedicated a tomb at Amiternum in Samnium, dating from the latter half of the second century, for her son, Publius Pompuledius Amandus.
- Tebana P. f. Celsa, named in an inscription from Amiternum.

== See also ==
- List of Roman gentes

== Bibliography ==
- Theodor Mommsen et alii, Corpus Inscriptionum Latinarum (The Body of Latin Inscriptions, abbreviated CIL), Berlin-Brandenburgische Akademie der Wissenschaften (1853–present).
- Notizie degli Scavi di Antichità (News of Excavations from Antiquity, abbreviated NSA), Accademia dei Lincei (1876–present).
- René Cagnat et alii, L'Année épigraphique (The Year in Epigraphy, abbreviated AE), Presses Universitaires de France (1888–present).
- George Davis Chase, "The Origin of Roman Praenomina", in Harvard Studies in Classical Philology, vol. VIII, pp. 103–184 (1897).
- Paul von Rohden, Elimar Klebs, & Hermann Dessau, Prosopographia Imperii Romani (The Prosopography of the Roman Empire, abbreviated PIR), Berlin (1898).
