= Trebelliena gens =

Ancient Roman family

The gens Trebelliena was an obscure plebeian family at ancient Rome. The only member of this gens who achieved any importance in the Roman state was Titus Trebellienus Rufus, who attained the rank of praetor, and was appointed governor of Thrace by Tiberius in AD 19.

== Origin ==
The nomen Trebellienus belongs to a class of gentilicia formed using the suffix -enus, typically used to form nomina from existing gentilicia ending in an i stem. Here the name is formed from the nomen Trebellius.

== Members ==
This list includes abbreviated praenomina. For an explanation of this practice, see filiation.

- Titus Trebellienus L. f. Rufus, had been quaestor, tribune of the plebs, and praetor. In AD 19, the emperor Tiberius appointed him to oversee the administration of Thrace for the children of Cotys. In 35, Trebellienus was accused of maiestas, and put an end to his own life.
- Trebelliena Nereis, buried at Rome, with a tomb dedicated by her husband, whose name has not been preserved.
- Trebelliena Felicitas, buried at Telesia in Samnium, in a second-century tomb built by her husband, Publius Vibius Ampliatus.

== See also ==
- List of Roman gentes

== Bibliography ==
- Publius Cornelius Tacitus, Annales.
- Dictionary of Greek and Roman Biography and Mythology, William Smith, ed., Little, Brown and Company, Boston (1849).
- Theodor Mommsen et alii, Corpus Inscriptionum Latinarum (The Body of Latin Inscriptions, abbreviated CIL), Berlin-Brandenburgische Akademie der Wissenschaften (1853–present).
- George Davis Chase, "The Origin of Roman Praenomina", in Harvard Studies in Classical Philology, vol. VIII, pp. 103–184 (1897).
- Paul von Rohden, Elimar Klebs, & Hermann Dessau, Prosopographia Imperii Romani (The Prosopography of the Roman Empire, abbreviated PIR), Berlin (1898).
