= Umbilia gens =

Ancient Roman family

The gens Umbilia was an obscure plebeian family at ancient Rome. No members of this gens are mentioned by Roman writers, but several are known from inscriptions, indicating that they had attained senatorial rank by the late second century.

== Origin ==
The nomen Umbilius belongs to a class of gentilicia originally formed from cognomina ending in the diminutive suffix -ulus, and the double-diminutives -ellus and -illus. The root might be a word such as Umber, one of the Umbri, or umbra, a shadow.

== Members ==
This list includes abbreviated praenomina. For an explanation of this practice, see filiation.

- Umbilia C. f. Victoria, buried at Theveste in Africa Proconsularis, in a late first-century tomb built by her husband, Firmus.
- Umbilis Q. l. Pamphila, a freedwoman buried in a second-century tomb at Spoletium in Umbria, along with the freedmen Lucius Cuspius Timos and Lucius Cuspius Antiochus.
- Marcus Umbilius Maximinus, a Roman senator, was patron of the boatbuilder's guild at Ostia in AD 192.
- Umbilius Dextrianus, named in an inscription from Lambaesis in Numidia, dating from AD 200.
- Marcus Umbilius M. f. Maximinus Praetextatus, son of the senator, was honoured as a patron of Ostia with an inscription dated the Kalends of March, AD 200.

=== Undated Umbilii ===
- Umbilius, named in a sepulchral inscription from Carthage in Africa Proconsularis.
- Marcus Umbilius, donated the slaves Crito and Pylades to the steward of the cult of Mithras at Ostia.
- Umbilius Dionysius, (Note: Or possibly Umbilia Dionysia.) buried at Ossonoba in Lusitania.
- Lucius Umbilius Felix, buried at Pupput in Africa Proconsularis, aged one hundred fifteen years, seven months, and fifteen days.
- Umbilia Ɔ. l. Ianthis, a freedwoman buried at Circeii in Latium, in a family sepulchre built by Aulus Aemilius for himself, his wife, Aemilia Thymele, Umbilia Ianthis, and the freedman Publius Flavius Hilarus.

== See also ==
- List of Roman gentes

== Bibliography ==
- Theodor Mommsen et alii, Corpus Inscriptionum Latinarum (The Body of Latin Inscriptions, abbreviated CIL), Berlin-Brandenburgische Akademie der Wissenschaften (1853–present).
- Gustav Wilmanns, Inscriptiones Africae Latinae (Latin Inscriptions from Africa), Georg Reimer, Berlin (1881).
- René Cagnat et alii, L'Année épigraphique (The Year in Epigraphy, abbreviated AE), Presses Universitaires de France (1888–present).
- George Davis Chase, "The Origin of Roman Praenomina", in Harvard Studies in Classical Philology, vol. VIII, pp. 103–184 (1897).
- Paul von Rohden, Elimar Klebs, & Hermann Dessau, Prosopographia Imperii Romani (The Prosopography of the Roman Empire, abbreviated PIR), Berlin (1898).
- O Arqueólogo Português (The Portuguese Archaeologist), Museu Nacional de Arqueologia e Etnologia (National Museum of Archaeology and Ethnology), Lisbon.
- Maarten Jozef Vermaseren, Corpus Inscriptionum et Monumentorum Religionis Mithriacae (The Body of Inscriptions and Monuments of the Mithraic Religion), Martinus Nijhoff, The Hague (1956–1960).
