= Utiana gens =

The gens Utiana was an obscure plebeian family of ancient Rome. None of its members are known from history, but two appear in inscriptions that have attracted scholarly attention.

== Origin ==
The nomen gentilicium Utianus is probably an elaboration of the nomen Utius, and may be connected with an epithet of the Oscan goddess Mefitis, referred to as "Mefitis Utiana" in several inscriptions from Lucania.

== Members ==
This list includes abbreviated praenomina. For an explanation of this practice, see filiation.

- Gaius Utianus C. f. Rufus Latinianus, the son of Marcus Latinius, was adopted by a Gaius Utianus, and became one of the municipal duumvirs of the Volceiani. He married Insteia Polla, a priestess of the imperial cult, who first came to his house at the age of seven, and was married to him for fifty-five years. Latinianus was buried at Forum Popilii in Campania, along with his sister, Latinia Posilla, in a tomb dating from the reign of Tiberius, and dedicated by his wife. (Note: The gravesite contains a depiction of a head with three protruding legs surrounded by the letters "SIC". Although the exact purpose of the artwork is unclear, the text may—according to the classicist Roger Wilson—have functioned as an abbreviation for "Sicilia".) The Decurions of the Volceiani honoured him with a public funeral and an equestrian statue.
- Marcus Utianus Onesimus, dedicated a tomb at Numistro in Lucania, dating from the middle or later second century, for his wife, Ulpia Sperata.
