= Vatinia gens =

The gens Vatinia, also spelled Vatiena or Vaciena, was a minor plebeian family at ancient Rome. The best-known member of this gens was Publius Vatinius, one of Caesar's allies, who attained the consulship in 47 BC.

== Origin ==
The nomen Vatinius belongs to a class of gentilicia formed from cognomina ending in -inus. The form Vatienus may represent a separate gens derived from Vatinius, as the ending -enus is typical of gentilicia formed from other nomina, although in some instances the names may have become confused. The etymology of these names is uncertain, but they might be connected with the surname Vatius, originally referring to someone with bow-legs.

== Members ==
- Publius Vatienus, a native of Reate, claimed in 168 BC, during the Third Macedonian War, that as he was returning to Rome by night, he was approached by the Dioscuri, who told him that Perseus of Macedon had been captured. Though at first imprisoned, he was freed when word arrived that the proconsul Lucius Aemilius Paullus had captured Perseus on the day in question.
- Vatiena, mistress of the poet Laevius.
- Publius Vatinius P. f. P. n., the grandson of Publius Vatienus of Reate, was a prominent supporter of Caesar. The triumvirs obtained the praetorship for him in 55 BC, and he was named consul in 47. Subsequently proconsul, he triumphed over the Illyrians in 42.
- Vatinius, a notorious delator in the court of Nero, had previously been a shoemaker's apprentice and a fool. He may have introduced the fashionable spouted drinking cup that became known as the Vatinius.
- Vatinia Primigenia, the wife of Quintus Poppaeus Sabinus of Pompeii.

== See also ==
- List of Roman gentes

== Bibliography ==
- Marcus Tullius Cicero, De Natura Deorum.
- Publius Cornelius Tacitus, Annales, Historiae, Dialogus de Oratoribus (Dialogue on Oratory).
- Lucius Cassius Dio, Roman History.
- Dictionary of Greek and Roman Biography and Mythology, William Smith, ed., Little, Brown and Company, Boston (1849).
- George Davis Chase, "The Origin of Roman Praenomina", in Harvard Studies in Classical Philology, vol. VIII, pp. 103–184 (1897).
- T. Robert S. Broughton, The Magistrates of the Roman Republic, American Philological Association (1952–1986).
- Václev Marek, Greek and Latin Inscriptions on Stone in the Collections of Charles University, Univerzita Karlova (1977).
- Liisa Sauvunen, Women in the Urban Texture of Pompeii, University of Helsinki (1997).
