= Pontidia gens =

Ancient Roman family

The gens Pontidia was an obscure plebeian family at ancient Rome. Members of this gens appear in history during the final century of the Republic, but none of them obtained any of the higher offices of the Roman state.

== Origin ==
The nomen Pontidius belongs to a class of gentilicia which were originally derived from cognomina ending in -idus. However, such names were so common that the ending -idius came to be regarded as a regular gentile-forming suffix, and was applied in cases where there was no morphological justification. This may have been the case with Pontidius, which is probably derived from the Oscan praenomen Pompo or Pomptus, which also gave rise to several other nomina, including Pompilius, Pomponius, and Pontius. Pompo was the Oscan cognate of the Latin praenomen Quintus, and thus Pontidius was equivalent to Latin gentes such as Quinctia and Quinctilia.

== Members ==
- Gaius Pontidius, one of the leaders of the allies during the Social War, probably the general of the Vestini. Appian calls him "Gaius Pontilius".
- Pontidia, a Roman matron, whose son was a candidate for the hand of Tullia, daughter of Cicero.
- Marcus Pontidius, a native of Arpinum, is praised by Cicero as a refined, passionate, and efficient orator and advocate in the law courts.

== See also ==
- List of Roman gentes

== Bibliography ==
- Marcus Tullius Cicero, Brutus, Epistulae ad Atticum.
- Marcus Velleius Paterculus, Compendium of Roman History.
- Appianus Alexandrinus (Appian), Bellum Civile (The Civil War).
- Dictionary of Greek and Roman Biography and Mythology, William Smith, ed., Little, Brown and Company, Boston (1849).
- George Davis Chase, "The Origin of Roman Praenomina", in Harvard Studies in Classical Philology, vol. VIII (1897).
