= Utilia gens =

Ancient Roman family

The gens Utilia was an obscure plebeian family at ancient Rome. Almost no members of this gens are mentioned in history, but a number are known from inscriptions.

== Origin ==
The nomen Utilius belongs to a large class of gentilicia originally formed from cognomina ending in the diminutive suffix -ulus and related suffixes. The root, utilis, would have been bestowed on someone thought useful, helpful, capable, or suitable in some manner.

== Praenomina ==
The praenomen found with the largest number of inscriptions of the Utilii is Gnaeus, which was common throughout Roman history, but only used by a minority of families. Other praenomina found in epigraphy include Lucius, Marcus, and Publius, each of which was common at all periods.

== Members ==
This list includes abbreviated praenomina. For an explanation of this practice, see filiation.

- Gnaeus Utilius, the master of Antiochus, a slave named in an inscription from Cora in Latium, dating from the middle portion of the first century BC.
- Gnaeus Utilius Cn. l. Eros, a freedman named in an inscription from Rome, dating from the first half of the first century.
- Utilia Alce, dedicated a tomb at Rome, dating from the latter half of the first century, for her grandson, Quintus Plotius Celer, aged one year, five months, and seven days.
- Gnaeus Utilius Januarius, dedicated a tomb at Ulubrae in Latium, dating between the middle of the first century and the end of the second, for his foster son, Marcus Asidonius Atticus, aged seven years, eleven months, and fourteen days.
- Utilia M. l. Myrtale, a freedwoman, wife of the freedman Marcus Valerius Herma, and the mother of Valeria Septimina, for whom she and Herma built a second-century tomb at Ariminum in Cisalpine Gaul. The inscription naming this family may be a forgery.
- Utilius, reportedly the lover of Faustina the Younger, whom Marcus Aurelius nonetheless advanced, is probably to be identified with Marcus Tutilius Pontianus Gentianus.
- Lucius Utilius L. f. Sabinianus, a native of Fanum Fortunae, in Umbria, was a soldier in the twelfth urban cohort at Rome in AD 197.

=== Undated Utilii ===
- Utilia P. l. Hilara, a freedwoman buried at Rome.

== See also ==
- List of Roman gentes

== Bibliography ==
- Aelius Lampridius, Aelius Spartianus, Flavius Vopiscus, Julius Capitolinus, Trebellius Pollio, and Vulcatius Gallicanus, Historia Augusta (Lives of the Emperors).
- Theodor Mommsen et alii, Corpus Inscriptionum Latinarum (The Body of Latin Inscriptions, abbreviated CIL), Berlin-Brandenburgische Akademie der Wissenschaften (1853–present).
- René Cagnat et alii, L'Année épigraphique (The Year in Epigraphy, abbreviated AE), Presses Universitaires de France (1888–present).
- George Davis Chase, "The Origin of Roman Praenomina", in Harvard Studies in Classical Philology, vol. VIII, pp. 103–184 (1897).
- Paul von Rohden, Elimar Klebs, & Hermann Dessau, Prosopographia Imperii Romani (The Prosopography of the Roman Empire, abbreviated PIR), Berlin (1898).
- Antonio Ferrua, "Nuove Iscrizioni della Via Ostiense" (New Inscriptions from the Via Ostiensis), No. 5a, in Epigraphica, No. 21, pp. 97–116 (1959).
- D.P. Simpson, Cassell's Latin and English Dictionary, Macmillan Publishing Company, New York (1963).
