= Umbrena gens =

Ancient Roman family

The gens Umbrena was an obscure plebeian family at ancient Rome. Hardly any members of this gens appear in history, of whom the best known may have been Publius Umbrenus, one of the Catilinian conspirators in 63 BC. A few others are known from inscriptions.

== Origin ==
The nomen Umbrenus belongs to a class of gentilicia formed using the suffix -enus, usually derived from other nomina, or cognomina ending in -inus. The surname Umbrinus, in turn, is derived from Umber, an inhabitant of Umbria.

== Members ==
This list includes abbreviated praenomina. For an explanation of this practice, see filiation.

- Publius Umbrenus, a negotiator, or money-lender, in Gaul. In 63 BC, he was sent by Publius Cornelius Lentulus to approach the ambassadors of the Allobroges, and enlist their aid in overthrowing the Roman government by promising to assist them against their governor. Instead, the Allobroges reported the conspiracy to Cicero.
- Gaius Umbrenus, the father of Titus Umbrenus, named in a first-century BC inscription from Cliternia in Sabinum.
- Titus Umbrenus C. f., named in a first-century BC inscription from Cliternia.
- Aulus Umbrenus, the father of Umbrena Polla, a woman buried at Novaria in Gallia Narbonensis, in a tomb dating from the first half of the first century.
- Umbrena A. f. Polla, buried at Novaria in a tomb dating from the first half of the first century, built by her freedwoman, Doxa, as provided in her will.

== See also ==
- List of Roman gentes

== Bibliography ==
- Marcus Tullius Cicero, In Catilinam.
- Gaius Sallustius Crispus (Sallust), Bellum Catilinae (The Conspiracy of Catiline).
- Dictionary of Greek and Roman Biography and Mythology, William Smith, ed., Little, Brown and Company, Boston (1849).
- Theodor Mommsen et alii, Corpus Inscriptionum Latinarum (The Body of Latin Inscriptions, abbreviated CIL), Berlin-Brandenburgische Akademie der Wissenschaften (1853–present).
- Charlton T. Lewis and Charles Short, A Latin Dictionary, Clarendon Press, Oxford (1879).
- George Davis Chase, "The Origin of Roman Praenomina", in Harvard Studies in Classical Philology, vol. VIII, pp. 103–184 (1897).
