= Turbonia gens =

Ancient Roman family

The gens Turbonia was an obscure plebeian family of ancient Rome. No members of this gens are mentioned by Roman writers, but several are known from inscriptions. A family by this name lived at Flavia Solva in Noricum during the second and third centuries.

== Origin ==
The nomen Turbonius belongs to a large class of gentilicia originally formed from cognomina ending in -o and -onis. Although -onius later came to be regarded as a regular gentile-forming suffix in other names, here the root of the gentilicium is the surname Turbo, referring to a whirlwind.

== Praenomina ==
The only praenomina mentioned in the inscriptions of the Turbonii are Titus, Marcus, and Sextus, all of which were common throughout Roman history.

== Members ==
This list includes abbreviated praenomina. For an explanation of this practice, see filiation.

- Titus Turbonius Callistus, buried at Flavia Solva in Noricum, aged ninety, along with his wife, Turbonia Fusca, their son, Titus Turbonius Blastus, and his son, Noullus, in a sepulchre dating from the first half of the second century.
- Turbonia Fusca, buried at Flavia Solva, aged sixty-five, along with her husband, Titus Turbonius Callistus, their son, Titus Turbonius Blastus, and his son, Noullus, in a sepulchre dating from the first half of the second century.
- Titus Turbonius T. f. Blastus, the son of Titus Turbonius Callistus and Turbonia Fusca, buried at Flavia Solva, aged sixty, along with his parents and his son, Noullus, in a sepulchre dating from the first half of the second century.
- (Titus Turbonius T. f. T. n.) Noullus, a youth buried at Flavia Solva, aged fifteen, along with his father, Titus Turbonius Blastus, and grandparents, Titus Turbonius Callistus and Turbonia Fusca, in a sepulchre dating from the first half of the second century.
- Marcus Turbonius, together with his wife, Turbonia Suadra, dedicated a sepulchre at Flavia Solva, dating from the middle part of the second century, for themselves and their children, Turbonius Successus, Sextus, and Secundina.
- Turbonia Suadra, together with her husband, Marcus Turbonius, dedicated a sepulchre at Flavia Solva for themselves and their children, Turbonius Successus, Sextus, and Secundina.
- Turbonius M. f. Successus, buried in a family sepulchre at Flavia Solva, dating from the middle part of the second century, built by his parents, Marcus Turbonius and Turbonia Suadra, for themselves and their children, Successus, Sextus, and Secundina.
- Sextus (Turbonius M. f.), buried in a family sepulchre at Flavia Solva, dating from the middle part of the second century, built by his parents, Marcus Turbonius and Turbonia Suadra, for themselves and their children, Turbonius Successus, Sextus, and Secundina.
- (Turbonia M. f.) Secundina, buried in a family sepulchre at Flavia Solva, dating from the middle part of the second century, built by her parents, Marcus Turbonius and Turbonia Suadra, for themselves and their children, Turbonius Successus, Sextus, and Secundina.
- Turbonia Nigrina, buried at Flavia Solva, along with her daughter, Finita, aged three, and Julius Rufus Valens, in a sepulchre dedicated by her husband, Marcus Fidelis, dating between the middle part of the second century and the early part of the third.
- Turbonius Fuscinus, a beneficarius in the Legio II Italica, made an offering to Jupiter Optimus Maximus at Iuvavum in Noricum in AD 202.

== See also ==
- List of Roman gentes

== Bibliography ==
- Theodor Mommsen et alii, Corpus Inscriptionum Latinarum (The Body of Latin Inscriptions, abbreviated CIL), Berlin-Brandenburgische Akademie der Wissenschaften (1853–present).
- Charlton T. Lewis and Charles Short, A Latin Dictionary, Clarendon Press, Oxford (1879).
- René Cagnat et alii, L'Année épigraphique (The Year in Epigraphy, abbreviated AE), Presses Universitaires de France (1888–present).
- George Davis Chase, "The Origin of Roman Praenomina", in Harvard Studies in Classical Philology, vol. VIII, pp. 103–184 (1897).
