= Sabucia gens =

Ancient Roman plebeian family

The gens Sabucia was a minor plebeian family at ancient Rome. Members of this gens are first mentioned in imperial times. The most illustrious of the family was Gaius Sabucius Major Caecilianus, who obtained the consulship in AD 186. Other Sabucii are known from inscriptions.

== Origin ==
The historian Anthony Birley indicates that the Sabucii were of Etruscan origin.

== Branches and cognomina ==
The Sabucii used a variety of personal cognomina. The only family surname known from inscriptions is Major, typically given to the elder of two or more siblings; the cognomen Magnus, great, borne by one of the other Sabucii, might suggest a connection to this family. Sabinus usually designated someone of Sabine ancestry, but might also refer to one who resembled a Sabine in his manner or habits. Aper, found in one inscription of the consul Gaius Sabucius Major, refers to a wild boar.

== Members ==
This list includes abbreviated praenomina. For an explanation of this practice, see filiation.

- Sabucius Aspasius, probably the father of a little boy buried at Rome, aged three years, thirty-two days, and two hours.
- Sabucius Aurelianus, named in an inscription from Rome.
- Gnaeus Sabucius Botrius, dedicated a monument to Appius Claudius Sulpicius Julianus at Castrimoenium in Latium.
- Sabucius Magnus, buried at Rome, aged sixty.
- Gaius Sabucius C. f. Major Caecilianus Aper, consul suffectus in AD 186, had been tribune of the plebs, praetor, prefect of the aerarium militare, judicial legate in Britain, and governor of Belgica and Achaia.
- Gaius Sabucius (C. f.) C. n. Major Plotinus Faustinus, grandson of Caecilianus, was a young man of senatorial rank, who set up a monument commemorating his grandfather's achievements.
- Gaius Sabucius Murranus, buried at Bononia in Etruria, together with Vibia Exorata, perhaps his wife.
- Gaius Sabucius Perpetuus, named in a second century inscription from Tellenae in Latium.
- Sextus Sabucius Sabinus, a man of senatorial rank, named in a second or third century inscription from Florentia in Etruria.

== See also ==
- List of Roman gentes

== Bibliography ==
- Theodor Mommsen et alii, Corpus Inscriptionum Latinarum (The Body of Latin Inscriptions, abbreviated CIL), Berlin-Brandenburgische Akademie der Wissenschaften (1853–present).
- Giovanni Battista de Rossi, Inscriptiones Christianae Urbis Romanae Septimo Saeculo Antiquiores (Christian Inscriptions from Rome of the First Seven Centuries, abbreviated ICUR), Vatican Library, Rome (1857–1861, 1888).
- Wilhelm Henzen, Ephemeris Epigraphica: Corporis Inscriptionum Latinarum Supplementum (Journal of Inscriptions: Supplement to the Corpus Inscriptionum Latinarum, abbreviated EE), Institute of Roman Archaeology, Rome (1872–1913).
- René Cagnat et alii, L'Année épigraphique (The Year in Epigraphy, abbreviated AE), Presses Universitaires de France (1888–present).
- George Davis Chase, "The Origin of Roman Praenomina", in Harvard Studies in Classical Philology, vol. VIII, pp. 103–184 (1897).
- Paul von Rohden, Elimar Klebs, & Hermann Dessau, Prosopographia Imperii Romani (The Prosopography of the Roman Empire, abbreviated PIR), Berlin (1898).
- Giovanni Maria De Rossi, Bovillae, Olschki, Florence (1979).
- Anthony R. Birley, The Fasti of Roman Britain, Clarendon Press (1981).
- John C. Traupman, The New College Latin & English Dictionary, Bantam Books, New York (1995).
