= Caepasia gens =

Plebeian family of Ancient Rome

The gens Caepasia or Cepasia was an obscure plebeian family at Ancient Rome. It is known primarily from two brothers, Gaius and Lucius Caepasius, who obtained the quaestorship through their oratorical skill. Cicero describes them as contemporaries of Quintus Hortensius, and says that they were hard workers, although their rhetorical style was relatively simple. Several members of this gens are known from early Christian inscriptions at Rome, including a number of children.

== Members ==
- Gaius Caepasius, an orator contemporary with Hortensius, who became quaestor through his rhetorical ability.
- Lucius Caepasius, brother of Gaius, who likewise served as quaestor thanks to his oratorical skill.
- Cepasius Severianus, the husband of Valeria Severiana, and son-in-law of Publia Ovinia Dionysia, for whom he and his wife dedicated a monument at Novaria in Cisalpine Gaul, dating to the first half of the second century.
- Cepasia Valeriana, buried in a second century tomb, possibly built by her husband, at Vercellae in Cisalpine Gaul.
- Titus Caepasius Maxumus, buried at the present site of Abertura, south of the Roman town of Turgalium in Lusitania.
- Cepasius Secundus, a soldier in the thirteenth Legion, fulfilled a vow to Silvanus, according to an inscription from Ad Fines in Pannonia Superior, dating to the later second or third century.
- Aurelia Cepasia, a little girl buried at Rome some time in the third century, aged six years, three months, and twenty-eight days.
- Cepasius, a youth buried at Rome, aged seventeen, with a monument from his parents.
- Cepasia, a young woman buried at Rome, aged twenty-three, on the fourth day before the Ides of January (January 10).
- Cepasia, buried at Rome on the fourth day before the Nones of November (November 2).
- Cepasius, a little boy buried at Rome, aged six years and five days.
- Cepasia, a girl buried at Rome, aged nine years and twenty-five days, on the fourth day before the Kalends of October (September 28).
- Cepasia, a little girl buried at Rome, aged five years and nine months.
- Cepasia, the wife of Lucretius Germanus, named on a family sepulchre at Rome.
- Cepasius, named in a funerary inscription from Rome.
- Cepasia, the wife of Frontonianus, buried at Rome, aged twenty-eight years, six months, on the seventh day before the Ides of July (July 8).

== See also ==
- List of Roman gentes

== Bibliography ==
- Marcus Tullius Cicero, Brutus, Pro Cluentio.
- Marcus Fabius Quintilianus (Quintilian), Institutio Oratoria (Institutes of Oratory).
- Gaius Julius Victor, De Arte Rhetorica (On the Art of Rhetoric).
- Dictionary of Greek and Roman Biography and Mythology, William Smith, ed., Little, Brown and Company, Boston (1849).
- Theodor Mommsen et alii, Corpus Inscriptionum Latinarum (The Body of Latin Inscriptions, abbreviated CIL), Berlin-Brandenburgische Akademie der Wissenschaften (1853–present).
- Giovanni Battista de Rossi, Inscriptiones Christianae Urbis Romanae Septimo Saeculo Antiquiores (Christian Inscriptions from Rome of the First Seven Centuries, abbreviated ICUR), Vatican Library, Rome (1857–1861, 1888).
- René Cagnat et alii, L'Année épigraphique (The Year in Epigraphy, abbreviated AE), Presses Universitaires de France (1888–present).
- Ernst Diehl, Inscriptiones Latinae Christianae Veteres (Ancient Latin Christian Inscriptions, abbreviated ILCV), Weidmann, Berlin (1925–1931).
- Julio Esteban Ortega, Corpus de Inscripciones Latinas de Cáceres (The Body of Latin Inscriptions from Caceres), Universidad de Extremadura (2007–2013).
