= Lavinia gens =

Ancient Roman family

The gens Lavinia was a minor family at ancient Rome.

== Origin ==
The nomen Lavinius could come from the ancient town of Lavinium, which was said to have been founded by Aeneas, and named for his wife, Lavinia, the daughter of Latinus. It could also be an alternate form of Laevinius. However, the first recorded member was a colonial magistrate at Luceria at the end of the Pyrrhic War, so the gens possibly originated from this city.

== Members ==
- Marcus Lavinius, duumvir of Luceria circa 275 BC; he minted bronze coins during his magistracy.
- Publius Lavinius, a Latin grammarian, and the author of De Verbis Sordidis ("On Vulgar Words"), a treatise mentioned by Aulus Gellius. He could possibly be the same person as the Laevinus mentioned by Macrobius.
- Quintus Lavinius Marcellus, provided a memorial tablet for his grandmother, Julia Philumene, found near St. Peter's Basilica.
- Aulus Curtius Lavinius Suavis, named on a sepulchral inscription near the Praenestine Gate.
- Titus Lavinius, commemorated on an inscription in the street between the Colosseum and San Giovanni, probably should be read as Flavinus.

== See also ==
- List of Roman gentes
