= Quartia gens =

The gens Quartia was an obscure plebeian family at ancient Rome. No members of this gens appear in history, but several are known from inscriptions.

== Origin ==
The nomen Quartius is a patronymic surname, derived from the cognomen Quartus, fourth. There may at one time have been a praenomen Quartus, but it was not in general use in historical times, except in the feminine form, Quarta, which was regularly used as both a praenomen and cognomen.

== Members ==
- Quintus Quartius, dedicated a tomb on Maiorica in Hispania Citerior to a woman named Scaraotia, aged twenty.
- Sextus Quartius, dedicated a tomb for Martia, a freedwoman buried at Carpentoracte in Gallia Narbonensis.
- Quartia Aphrodisia, mother of Quartia Herois.
- Titus Quartius Crescentinius, named in a funerary inscription from Lilybaeum in Sicily.
- Quartia Herois, daughter of Quartia Aphrodisia, wife of Marcus Publius Posidonius, and mother of Publius Flavianus, buried at Arelate in Gallia Narbonensis, aged twenty-two.
- Quartia Irvatilla, buried at Massilia in Gallia Narbonensis.
- Titus Quartius Masculus, named in a funerary inscription from Lilybaeum.
- Quartius Quietus, made a libationary offering to the gods at Colonia Claudia Ara Agrippinensium in Germania Inferior, in AD 252.
- Gaius Quartius Quintinus, dedicated a tomb for his friend, Gaius Apisius Zosimus, and his wife, Romogillia Festa, at Nemausus in Gallia Narbonensis.
- Quartius Reditus, made a libationary offering to Nehalennia at Ganventa in Gallia Belgica.
- Quartia Saturnina, dedicated a tomb at Mogontiacum to her husband, Marcus, a veteran of the twenty-second legion, and her son, Januarius.
- Quartia Secundilla, a freedwoman, and wife of Quartius Ulpius, named in a funerary inscription at Lugdunum in Gallia Lugdunensis.
- Gaius Quartius Secundus, a soldier in the thirteenth legion, named in a funerary inscription from Rome, dating to the second century AD.
- Quartius Ulpius, freedman of Primitivus, and husband of Quartia Secundilla, buried at Lugdunum.

== See also ==
- List of Roman gentes

== Bibliography ==
- Theodor Mommsen et alii, Corpus Inscriptionum Latinarum (The Body of Latin Inscriptions, abbreviated CIL), Berlin-Brandenburgische Akademie der Wissenschaften (1853–present).
- René Cagnat et alii, L'Année épigraphique (The Year in Epigraphy, abbreviated AE), Presses Universitaires de France (1888–present).
- Hans Petersen, "The Numeral Praenomina of the Romans", in Transactions of the American Philological Association, vol. xciii, pp. 347–354 (1962).
- Cristóbal Veny, Corpus de las Inscripciones Baleáricas hasta la Dominación Árabe (The Balearic Inscriptions up to the Arab Conquest, abbreviated CIBalear), Madrid (1965).
