= Mescinia gens =

The gens Mescinia was a minor plebeian family at Rome. None of its members held any of the higher magistracies, but Lucius Mescinius Rufus, perhaps the most famous of the gens, was quaestor under Cicero during the latter's administration of Cilicia. Other Mescinii are known from inscriptions.

== Members ==
This list includes abbreviated praenomina. For an explanation of this practice, see filiation.

- Lucius Mescinius Rufus, quaestor under Cicero in Cilicia, in 51 BC. The two did not work well together, but their relations improved, as recounted in Cicero's letters to and on behalf of Rufus. After Caesar's death, he joined the party of Gaius Cassius Longinus, who sent him to plunder Tarsus. He must later have been reconciled with Octavian, as he was triumvir monetalis in 17 and 16 BC.
- Marcus Mescinius, the former master of Gnaeus Mescinius Philologus.
- Gnaeus Mescinius M. l. Philologus, mentioned in an inscription from Delos.
- Mescinius L. f., named in a fragmentary inscription from Rome.
- Gaius Mescinius, the former master of Gaius Mescinius Hilarus.
- Gaius Mescinius C. l. Hilarus, a freedman, dedicated an altar at Rome to the gods of the underworld.
- Lucius Mescinius, the former master of Lucius Mescinius Apollinaris.
- Lucius Mescinius L. l. Apollinaris, mentioned in a dedicatory inscription at Rome.
- Titus Mescinius Amphio, listed among a group of men deputized in the service of the emperor at Pompeii, in AD 2.
- Titus Mescinius S. (l?) Eros, probably a freedman, mentioned in a long list of persons belonging to the household of Marcus Valerius Dexter Silvanus, at Trebula Mutuesca in Samnium, dating to AD 60.

== See also ==
- List of Roman gentes

== Bibliography ==
- Marcus Tullius Cicero, Epistulae ad Atticum, Epistulae ad Familiares.
- Lucius Cassius Dio Cocceianus (Cassius Dio), Roman History.
- Joseph Hilarius Eckhel, Doctrina Numorum Veterum (The Study of Ancient Coins, 1792–1798).
- Dictionary of Greek and Roman Biography and Mythology, William Smith, ed., Little, Brown and Company, Boston (1849).
- Theodor Mommsen et alii, Corpus Inscriptionum Latinarum (The Body of Latin Inscriptions, abbreviated CIL), Berlin-Brandenburgische Akademie der Wissenschaften (1853–present).
- René Cagnat et alii, L'Année épigraphique (The Year in Epigraphy, abbreviated AE), Presses Universitaires de France (1888–present).
- T. Robert S. Broughton, The Magistrates of the Roman Republic, American Philological Association (1952).
