= Statoria gens =

Ancient Roman family

The gens Statoria was a minor plebeian family at ancient Rome. Members of this gens are first mentioned in the time of the Second Punic War. None of them ever attained any of the higher offices of the Roman state.

== Origin ==
The nomen Statorius is derived from Stator, an epithet of Jupiter and Mars. Chase classifies it among those gentilicia that either originated at Rome, or cannot be shown to have come from anywhere else.

== Members ==
This list includes abbreviated praenomina. For an explanation of this practice, see filiation.

- Quintus Statorius, (Note: Called Lucius by Frontinus.) a centurion serving under the proconsuls Publius and Gnaeus Cornelius Scipio in Spain in 213 BC, during the Second Punic War. Statorius was dispatched as an envoy to the Numidian king Syphax, whose soldiers he trained in Roman tactics. On a subsequent occasion, he accompanied Gaius Laelius on an embassy to Syphax, but as Statorius was known to the Numidians, Laelius pretended he was a slave, caning him to maintain the disguise.
- Gaius Statorius C. f., a native of Brundisium in Calabria, who was one of the first emissaries sent to Delphi after the liberation of Aetolia in 191 BC.
- Gaius Statorius C. f. Rufus, named in an inscription from Amiternum in Sabinum.
- Statorius Victor, a native of Corduba in Hispania Baetica, was an orator mentioned by Seneca the Elder, his fellow townsman.
- Statoria M. f. Marcella, buried at Rome between AD 92 and 106, was the wife of Gaius Minicius Fundanus, consul in 107. Their daughter, Minicia Marcella, was buried in an adjacent tomb, aged twelve years, eleven months, and seven days.

== See also ==
- List of Roman gentes

== Bibliography ==
- Dionysius of Halicarnassus, Romaike Archaiologia.
- Titus Livius (Livy), History of Rome.
- Lucius Annaeus Seneca (Seneca the Elder), Suasoriae (Rhetorical Exercises).
- Sextus Julius Frontinus, Strategemata (Stratagems).
- Dictionary of Greek and Roman Biography and Mythology, William Smith, ed., Little, Brown and Company, Boston (1849).
- Theodor Mommsen et alii, Corpus Inscriptionum Latinarum (The Body of Latin Inscriptions, abbreviated CIL), Berlin-Brandenburgische Akademie der Wissenschaften (1853–present).
- August Pauly, Georg Wissowa, et alii, Realencyclopädie der Classischen Altertumswissenschaft (Scientific Encyclopedia of the Knowledge of Classical Antiquities, abbreviated RE or PW), J. B. Metzler, Stuttgart (1894–1980).
- George Davis Chase, "The Origin of Roman Praenomina", in Harvard Studies in Classical Philology, vol. VIII, pp. 103–184 (1897).
- T. Robert S. Broughton, The Magistrates of the Roman Republic, American Philological Association (1952–1986).
