= Sotidia gens =

Ancient Roman family

The gens Sotidia was an obscure plebeian family at ancient Rome. Hardly any members of this gens occur in history, but a few are known from inscriptions, dating to the first century of the Empire.

== Members ==
This list includes abbreviated praenomina. For an explanation of this practice, see filiation.

- Sextus Sotidius Sex. f. Strabo Libuscidianus, governor of Galatia at the commencement of the reign of Tiberius. He was subsequently one of the curatores of the waters and banks of the Tiber.
- Sextus Sotidius Primus Augustalis, named in a first-century sepulchral inscription from Canusium in Apulia, along with Flavia Dutia and Tyrannus.
- Sotidia L. f. Maxima, buried in a first-century family sepulchre built by her father, Lucius Postumulenus Nicephorus, at Canusium, along with her mother, Nonia Verecunda.

== See also ==
- List of Roman gentes

== Bibliography ==
- Theodor Mommsen et alii, Corpus Inscriptionum Latinarum (The Body of Latin Inscriptions, abbreviated CIL), Berlin-Brandenburgische Akademie der Wissenschaften (1853–present).
- René Cagnat et alii, L'Année épigraphique (The Year in Epigraphy, abbreviated AE), Presses Universitaires de France (1888–present).
- August Pauly, Georg Wissowa, et alii, Realencyclopädie der Classischen Altertumswissenschaft (Scientific Encyclopedia of the Knowledge of Classical Antiquities, abbreviated RE or PW), J. B. Metzler, Stuttgart (1894–1980).
- Paul von Rohden, Elimar Klebs, & Hermann Dessau, Prosopographia Imperii Romani (The Prosopography of the Roman Empire, abbreviated PIR), Berlin (1898).
