= Sinicia gens =

Ancient Roman family

The gens Sinicia was an obscure plebeian family at ancient Rome. No members of this gens are mentioned by ancient writers, but a few are known from inscriptions, mostly from Numidia, where they were locally prominent. Lucius Sinicius Reginus followed the cursus honorum at Rome, reaching the rank of praetor.

== Members ==
This list includes abbreviated praenomina. For an explanation of this practice, see filiation.

- Sinicius, named on a piece of pottery from Segodunum in Gallia Aquitania.
- Sinicius Fortunatus, an advocatus in the court of Lambaesis in Numidia, mentioned in an inscription dedicated to their patron, Tiberius Julius Pollienus Auspex, dating between AD 211 and 222.
- Publius Sinicius P. f. Munatius, a veteran soldier, buried at Castellum Arsacalitanum in Numidia, aged twenty-two, with a monument dedicated by his wife, Livia.
- Lucius Sinicius Reginus, buried at Rome in the late second century, had been tribune of the plebs, quaestor in Macedonia, and praetor.
- Sinicius Rufus, the brother of Sinicius Fortunatus, and likewise an advocatus at Lambaesis during the early third century.
- Sextus Sinicius Rufus, one of the flamines at Lambaesis.

== See also ==
- List of Roman gentes

== Bibliography ==
- Theodor Mommsen et alii, Corpus Inscriptionum Latinarum (The Body of Latin Inscriptions, abbreviated CIL), Berlin-Brandenburgische Akademie der Wissenschaften (1853–present).
- René Cagnat et alii, L'Année épigraphique (The Year in Epigraphy, abbreviated AE), Presses Universitaires de France (1888–present).
- Paul von Rohden, Elimar Klebs, & Hermann Dessau, Prosopographia Imperii Romani (The Prosopography of the Roman Empire, abbreviated PIR), Berlin (1898).
- La Carte Archéologique de la Gaule (Archaeological Map of Gaul, abbreviated CAG), Académie des Inscriptions et Belles-Lettres (1931–present).
