= Fufidia gens =

The gens Fufidia was a plebeian family at Rome. Members of this gens are first mentioned toward the end of the second century BC.

== Members ==
- Lucius Fufidius, a pleader of causes of some repute at Rome, about BC 115 to 105. Marcus Aemilius Scaurus addressed to him an autobiography in three books.
- Fufidius, propraetor of Hispania Baetica at the beginning of the Sertorian War. He is probably the same person as the Furfidius mentioned by Florus, who admonished Sulla during his proscription "to spare some that he might have some to rule." Sertorius defeated him in BC 83 or 82.
- Fufidius, an eques, whom Lucius Calpurnius Piso, when proconsul of Macedonia, assigned to his creditors at Apollonia. According to Cicero, this assignment was the more shameful because these very Apolloniates had procured by a bribe of 200 talents to Piso remission or delay of their own debts.
- Quintus Fufidius, an eques, and a native of Arpinum. He was one of three commissioners sent in BC 46 by the municipium of Arpinum to collect their rents in Cisalpine Gaul. Fufidius was the stepson of Marcus Caesius, and was tribune of a legion stationed in Cilicia during Cicero's consulship. Cicero recommended him to Marcus Junius Brutus.
- Fufidius, a wealthy man mentioned by Horace.
- Fufidius, a jurist, who probably lived between the time of Vespasian and Hadrian.
- Lucius Fufidius Pollio, consul in AD 166.

== See also ==
- List of Roman gentes
