= Stlaccia gens =

Ancient Roman family

The gens Stlaccia was a minor plebeian family at ancient Rome. Hardly any members of this gens are mentioned in history, but a number are known from inscriptions. By the second century, some of the Stlaccii had reached senatorial rank.

== Origin ==
The nomen Stlaccius is of Oscan origin.

== Members ==
This list includes abbreviated praenomina. For an explanation of this practice, see filiation.

- Gaius Stlaccius, a maker of amphorae whose workshop was along the Baetis in Hispania. Some of his pottery was found at the Baths of Diocletian, in Rome.
- Decimus Stlaccius, named in an inscription from Delos, dating from the second century BC.
- Marcus Stlaccius M. l, a freedman employed as a scriba at Rome about the middle of the first century BC.
- Marcus Stlaccius M. f., sailed on one of Caesar's ships during the African War in 46 BC, and was captured, but subsequently freed.
- Quintus Stlaccius, named in an inscription from Delos, dating from the second century BC.
- Tertia Stlaccia, named in an inscription from Delos, dating from the second century BC.
- Gaius Stlaccius C. l. A[...], a freedman at Neapolis in Campania, where he worked as a mensor sacomarius, or measurer of weights, together with Aulus Stlaccius Mario.
- Marcus Stlaccius Albinus Trebellius Sallustius Rufus, one of the senatorial patrons of an order for the enlargement of a temple at Ostia in Latium in AD 142.
- Lucius Stlaccius L. f. Macedo, a resident of Cyrene, mentioned in a decree of Augustus, dating to 6 or 7 BC, along with his brother, Aulus Stlaccius Maximus.
- Aulus Stlaccius A. l. Mario, a freedman at Neapolis, where he worked as a mensor sacomarius, together with Gaius Stlaccius.
- Aulus Stlaccius L. f. Maximus, a resident of Cyrene, mentioned in a decree of Augustus, along with his brother, Lucius Stlaccius Macedo.
- Stlaccia Ɔ. l. Quinta, a wealthy freedwoman who dedicated a tomb at Rome for herself, her husband, and her dispensator, or steward, Salvius.

== See also ==
- List of Roman gentes

== Bibliography ==
- Theodor Mommsen et alii, Corpus Inscriptionum Latinarum (The Body of Latin Inscriptions, abbreviated CIL), Berlin-Brandenburgische Akademie der Wissenschaften (1853–present).
- Wilhelm Henzen, Ephemeris Epigraphica: Corporis Inscriptionum Latinarum Supplementum (Journal of Inscriptions: Supplement to the Corpus Inscriptionum Latinarum, abbreviated EE), Institute of Roman Archaeology, Rome (1872–1913).
- August Pauly, Georg Wissowa, et alii, Realencyclopädie der Classischen Altertumswissenschaft (Scientific Encyclopedia of the Knowledge of Classical Antiquities, abbreviated RE or PW), J. B. Metzler, Stuttgart (1894–1980).
- Paul von Rohden, Elimar Klebs, & Hermann Dessau, Prosopographia Imperii Romani (The Prosopography of the Roman Empire, abbreviated PIR), Berlin (1898).
