= Splattia gens =

Ancient Roman family

The gens Splattia or Splatia was an obscure plebeian family at ancient Rome. Almost no members of this gens appear in history, but a few are known from inscriptions. The most illustrious of the Splattii was Gaius Splattius, praetor in AD 29, during the reign of Tiberius.

== Members ==
This list includes abbreviated praenomina. For an explanation of this practice, see filiation.

- Gaius Splattius, praetor urbanus in AD 29, and a member of the Arval Brethren.
- Marcus Splattius M. l. An[...], a freedman named in an inscription from Rome, dating between the middle of the first century, and the middle of the second.
- Splattia Corneliana, buried in a second-century tomb at Histonium in Samnium, dedicated by her mother, Mindia Tyche.
- Splattius Eutychus, dedicated a second- or third-century tomb at Histonium for his friend, Machario, aged thirty-five years, six months, along with Machario's mother, whose name has not been preserved.
- Splatia Nice, dedicated a second-century sepulchre at Aecae in Apulia for herself, her husband, Quintus Turranius Exoratus, and their daughter, Turrania Marcella, aged twenty-five years, two months.

== See also ==
- List of Roman gentes

== Bibliography ==
- Theodor Mommsen et alii, Corpus Inscriptionum Latinarum (The Body of Latin Inscriptions, abbreviated CIL), Berlin-Brandenburgische Akademie der Wissenschaften (1853–present).
- René Cagnat et alii, L'Année épigraphique (The Year in Epigraphy, abbreviated AE), Presses Universitaires de France (1888–present).
- August Pauly, Georg Wissowa, et alii, Realencyclopädie der Classischen Altertumswissenschaft (Scientific Encyclopedia of the Knowledge of Classical Antiquities, abbreviated RE or PW), J. B. Metzler, Stuttgart (1894–1980).
- Paul von Rohden, Elimar Klebs, & Hermann Dessau, Prosopographia Imperii Romani (The Prosopography of the Roman Empire, abbreviated PIR), Berlin (1898).
