= Sittia gens =

Ancient Roman family

The gens Sittia was a minor plebeian family at ancient Rome. The most illustrious member of this gens was Publius Sittius, an adventurer who met with great success during the African War, after allying himself with Caesar.

== Members ==
This list includes abbreviated praenomina. For an explanation of this practice, see filiation.

- Publius Sittius, a native of Nuceria in Campania, remained loyal to Rome during the Social War.
- Publius Sittius P. f., a friend and ally of Publius Cornelius Sulla, from whose defense by Cicero he likewise benefited. For some years he fought under the various kings of northern Africa, until in 46 BC he allied himself with Caesar, and fought successfully alongside Bocchus II against Juba I. After the Battle of Thapsus, Sittius captured Faustus Cornelius Sulla and Lucius Afranius, and sent them on to Caesar, who left him in command of western Numidia. Sittius was assassinated by Arabio in 44.
- Sittius, a resident of Cales in Campania, was among those proscribed by the Second Triumvirate in 43 BC. The citizens of Cales protected their fellow townsman, and appealed to the triumvirs, who agreed to reduce Sittius' punishment to exile in his home town.

== See also ==
- List of Roman gentes

== Bibliography ==
- Marcus Tullius Cicero, Epistulae ad Atticum, Epistulae ad Familiares, Pro Sulla.
- Aulus Hirtius (attributed), De Bello Africo (On the African War).
- Appianus Alexandrinus (Appian), Bellum Civile (The Civil War).
- Lucius Cassius Dio Cocceianus (Cassius Dio), Roman History.
- Dictionary of Greek and Roman Biography and Mythology, William Smith, ed., Little, Brown and Company, Boston (1849).
- August Pauly, Georg Wissowa, et alii, Realencyclopädie der Classischen Altertumswissenschaft (Scientific Encyclopedia of the Knowledge of Classical Antiquities, abbreviated RE or PW), J. B. Metzler, Stuttgart (1894–1980).
