= Tuscenia gens =

Ancient Roman family

The gens Tuscenia was an obscure plebeian family at ancient Rome. Few members of this gens appear in history, but others are known from inscriptions.

== Members ==
This list includes abbreviated praenomina. For an explanation of this practice, see filiation.

- Marcus Tuscenius L. f. Nobilior, one of several Romans named in a bilingual inscription from Ortygia in Achaia, dating from 125 BC.
- Tuscenius, a man of low character, whose daring act of extortion was frustrated by Quintus Cicero. His brother, the orator Cicero, reassured him that he was not moved by the complaints of Tuscenius, whom he describes as a madman and a knave. In a subsequent letter, Cicero relates that Tuscenius was perhaps the only man whose case could not be dealt with except by the harshest measures.
- Gaius Tuscenius C. l. Alupus, a freedman named in an inscription from Ephesus in Asia, dating from 35 BC.
- Tuscenius Felix, a centurion primus pilus who rendered a decision regarding a boundary marker, under the authority of Antoninus Pius.
- Gaius Tuscenius Communio, named along with Gaius Tuscenius Primitius in an inscription from Cumae in Campania, dating from AD 251.
- Gaius Tuscenius Primitius, named along ith Gaius Tuscenius Communio in an inscription from Cumae, dating from AD 251.

== See also ==
- List of Roman gentes

== Bibliography ==
- Marcus Tullius Cicero, Epistulae ad Quintum Fratrem.
- Theodor Mommsen et alii, Corpus Inscriptionum Latinarum (The Body of Latin Inscriptions, abbreviated CIL), Berlin-Brandenburgische Akademie der Wissenschaften (1853–present).
- Paul von Rohden, Elimar Klebs, & Hermann Dessau, Prosopographia Imperii Romani (The Prosopography of the Roman Empire, abbreviated PIR), Berlin (1898).
- T. Robert S. Broughton, The Magistrates of the Roman Republic, American Philological Association (1952–1986).
- Manfred Clauss, Anne Kolb, & Wolfgang A. Slaby, Epigraphik Datenbank Clauss/Slaby (abbreviated EDCS).
