= Laetilia gens =

The gens Laetilia was a minor Roman family during the final century of the Republic and under the early Empire. It is known chiefly from a few individuals.

== Members ==
This list includes abbreviated praenomina. For an explanation of this practice, see filiation.

- Lucius Laetilius, the regular tabellarius, or courier, of Verres.
- Gaius Laetilius M. f. Apalus, together with Ptolemaeus, son of Juba II, one of the duumvirs at Carthago Nova or Gades, named on inscriptions from coins.
- Lucius Laetilius, mentioned in an inscription from Dalmatia, dating to the first or early second century.

== See also ==
List of Roman gentes

== Bibliography ==
- Marcus Tullius Cicero, In Verrem.
- Joseph Hilarius Eckhel, Doctrina Numorum Veterum (The Study of Ancient Coins, 1792–1798).
- Dictionary of Greek and Roman Biography and Mythology, William Smith, ed., Little, Brown and Company, Boston (1849).
- Theodor Mommsen et alii, Corpus Inscriptionum Latinarum (The Body of Latin Inscriptions, abbreviated CIL), Berlin-Brandenburgische Akademie der Wissenschaften (1853–present).
- August Pauly, Georg Wissowa, et alii, Realencyclopädie der Classischen Altertumswissenschaft (Scientific Encyclopedia of the Knowledge of Classical Antiquities, abbreviated RE or PW), J. B. Metzler, Stuttgart (1894–1980).
- Attilio Degrassi, Inscriptiones Latinae Liberae Rei Publicae, (Free Latin Inscriptions of the Republic), La Nuova Italia, Florence (1957–1963).
