= Socellia gens =

Ancient Roman family

The gens Socellia was an obscure plebeian family at ancient Rome. No members of this gens are mentioned by ancient writers, but several are known from inscriptions.

== Origin ==
Nearly half of the Socellii mentioned in inscriptions came from towns in Samnium, strongly suggesting that the family was of Samnite origin.

== Praenomina ==
The main praenomina of the Socellii were Gaius and Marcus, two of the most common names at all periods of Roman history. There are also individual examples of Lucius, Publius, Quintus, and Sextus, all of which were also common.

== Members ==
This list includes abbreviated praenomina. For an explanation of this practice, see filiation.

- Socellius, a centurion in the third cohort of a legion stationed in Britannia between AD 122 and 138.
- Gaius Socellius, buried in a family sepulchre at Bovianum Vetus in Samnium, dating to the late first century BC or early first century AD, along with his brother, Quintus, and other relatives, and dedicated by Gaius Socellius Celer.
- Gaius Socellius, the master of Faustus, aged fifteen, and Auctus, aged twenty-two, two slaves buried at Terventum in Samnium.
- Lucius Socellius, named in an inscription from Rome.
- Quintus Socellius, buried in a family sepulchre at Bovianum Vetus, dating to the early empire, along with his brother, Gaius, and other relatives, and built by Gaius Socellius Celer.
- Marcus Socellius M. l. Auctus, a freedman, who together with his brother, Marcus Socellius Firmus, dedicated a monument at Abellinum in Campania to their mother, Socellia Prima.
- Gaius Socellius Sex. f. Celer, dedicated a family sepulchre at Bovianum Vetus for the brothers Gaius and Quintus Socellius, and other relatives.
- Socellius Chilo, a centurion mentioned in a second-century inscription from Carales in Sardinia.
- Marcus Socellius Cleno, built a mid-first-century tomb at Opitergium in Venetia and Histria for his mother, Socellia Pilinna.
- Lucius Socellius Felix, dedicated a tomb at Rome for his wife, Julia Gemella, aged twenty-seven, and another woman, named Cassia Auxis.
- Marcus Socellius M. l. Firmus, a freedman, and the brother of Marcus Socellius Auctus, with whom he dedicated a monument at Abellinum to their mother, Socellia Prima.
- Marcus Socellius Januarius, together with his mother-in-law, Laberia Restituta, dedicated a first-century tomb at Aeclanum in Samnium to his wife, Quinctia Maximilla, aged twenty-four.
- Socellia C. f. Lucana, buried at Rome, aged seven years, thirty days, in a sepulchre built by her parents, Gaius Socellius Saturninus and Blossia Januaria, for their family and their patron, Socellia Quartilla.
- Socellia M. l. Pilinna, buried in a mid-first-century tomb at Opitergium, built by her son, Marcus Socellius Cleno.
- Socellia M. l. Prima, a freedwoman buried at Abellinum, with a monument from her sons, Marcus Socellius Firmus and Marcus Socellius Auctus.
- Socellia P. f. Prima, dedicated a tomb at Rome for her husband, Quintus Roscius Gratus.
- Socellia Quartilla, buried at Rome, in a family sepulchre built by her clients, Gaius Socellius Saturninus and Blossia Januaria.
- Gaius Socellius Saturninus, together with his wife, Blossia Januaria, built a sepulchre at Rome for themselves, their daughter, Socellia Lucana, and their patron, Socellia Quartilla.
- Socellius Ursio, buried at Vibinum in Apulia, in a third-century tomb dedicated by his children.

== See also ==
- List of Roman gentes

== Bibliography ==
- Theodor Mommsen et alii, Corpus Inscriptionum Latinarum (The Body of Latin Inscriptions, abbreviated CIL), Berlin-Brandenburgische Akademie der Wissenschaften (1853–present).
- Supplementa Italica (Supplement for Italy), Unione Accademica Nazionale.
- Wilhelm Henzen, Ephemeris Epigraphica: Corporis Inscriptionum Latinarum Supplementum (Journal of Inscriptions: Supplement to the Corpus Inscriptionum Latinarum, abbreviated EE), Institute of Roman Archaeology, Rome (1872–1913).
- René Cagnat et alii, L'Année épigraphique (The Year in Epigraphy, abbreviated AE), Presses Universitaires de France (1888–present).
- The Roman Inscriptions of Britain (abbreviated RIB), Oxford, (1990–present).
- E. Labruna, Storia sociale dell'Hirpinia in età imperiale (The Story of Hirpinia in the Imperial Age, 2013).
