= Cantia gens =

Obscure plebeian family at Rome

The gens Cantia was an obscure plebeian family at Rome. The only member of this gens mentioned in history is Marcus Cantius, tribune of the plebs in 293 BC; however, some manuscripts of Livy give his nomen as Scantius. Other Cantii are known from inscriptions, particularly from Aquileia in Venetia and Histria.

== Members ==
This list includes abbreviated praenomina. For an explanation of this practice, see filiation.

- Cantia, perhaps the wife of Lucius Cantius Fidus, who dedicated a first- or second-century family sepulchre at Labacum in Pannonia Superior for himself, Cantia, and Cantia Optata, probably his daughter.
- Cantius T. f., made a sacrifice to Mercury and Rosmerta at Andematunum in Gallia Belgica.
- Marcus Cantius, or perhaps Scantius, tribune of the plebs in 293 BC, brought an indictment against Lucius Postumius Megellus, one of the consuls of the preceding year. Postumius, however, was appointed legate to the consul Spurius Carvilius Maximus, whose popularity shielded him from a trial.
- Lucius Cantius Acutus, a freedman buried in a third-century tomb at Aquileia, dedicated by his patron, Lucius Cantius Chrestus.
- Lucius Cantius Apollonius, a freedman at Aquileia in the early part of the first century. His former master was surnamed Verus.
- Cantia Bonia, the daughter of Junius, wife of Lucius Cantius Secundus, and mother of Cantia Boniata, buried in a family sepulchre dedicated by her husband, and found at the present site of Graz, originally part of Noricum, dating to the latter half of the first century.
- Cantia L. f. Boniata, daughter of Lucius Cantius Secundus and Cantia Bonia, buried in a family sepulchre dedicated by her father, and found at Graz, formerly in the province of Noricum, dating to the latter part of the first century.
- Lucius Cantius Chrestus, patron of the freedman Lucius Cantius Acutus, to whom he dedicated a third-century tomb at Aquileia.
- Cantia L. l. Cirrata, a freedwoman, and the wife of Lucius Cantius Probatus, with whom she was buried in a first-century sepulchre at Labacum, dedicated by her son, Lucius Cantius Proculus.
- Cantia Euhodia, together with Lucius Cantius Rufinus, made a donation to Aesculapius at Rome, dating to the first century, or the early part of the second.
- Cantius Euhodus, mentioned in a funerary inscription from Hasta in Liguria, was perhaps the freedman of Lucius Cantius Martianus.
- Cantius P. f. Felix, a young man buried at Rome, aged nineteen years, four days, in a tomb dating to the second century.
- Lucius Cantius L. l. Fidus, a freedman who dedicated a first- or second-century tomb at Labacum for himself, Cantia (perhaps his wife), and Cantia Optata, probably their daughter.
- Gaius Cantius Fluentinus, dedicated a tomb at Lugdunum in Gallia Lugdunensis to his wife, Acutia Amatrix, aged thirty.
- Lucius Cantius L. l. Fructus, a freedman and businessman at Aquileia in the early part of the first century.
- Lucius Cantius Ionicus, freedman of a woman named Spendusa, made an offering to Belenus, the tutelary god of Aquileia, in the early part of the first century.
- Cantius Manlianus, made a sacrifice to Mithras at Aquileia, dating to the latter part of the second, or early part of the third century.
- Lucius Cantius L. f. Martianus, an eques and decurion at Hasta and Aquileia, was buried at Hasta, aged twenty-seven. His tomb may have been dedicated by Cantius Euhodus.
- Gaius Cantius Modestinus, buried at Egitania in Lusitania some time in the first century, with a tomb dedicated by his son, also named Gaius Cantius Modestinus.
- Gaius Cantius C. f. Modestinus, dedicated a first-century tomb at Egitania to his father, and made donations out of his inheritance to the temples of Mars and Venus at Egitania, as well as to Victoria and a municipal deity in another part of the province.
- Cantia Europae l. Optata, a girl buried in a first- or second-century family sepulchre at Labacum, dedicated by Lucius Cantius Fidus, perhaps her father, for himself, Cantia Optata, and another Cantia, perhaps the girl's mother. Optata was aged six, and seems to have been a slave freed by a woman named Europa.
- Gaius Cantius Paternus, buried in a tomb found at Tresques, formerly part of Gallia Narbonensis, dedicated by his son, Gaius Cantius Servatus.
- Gaius Cantius C. f. C. n. Paternus, together with his brother, Gaius Cantius Secundus, dedicated a tomb found at Tresques to their father, Gaius Cantius Servatus.
- Gaius Cantius Pothinus, a potter at Arelate in Gallia Narbonensis.
- Lucius Cantius L. l. Probatus, a freedman, was buried along with his wife, Cantia Cirrata, in a first-century sepulchre at Labacum, dedicated by their son, Lucius Cantius Proculus.
- Lucius Cantius Primus, dedicated a tomb to his father at Rome.
- Lucius Cantius L. f. Proculus, dedicated a first-century sepulchre at Labacum for himself and his parents, Lucius Cantius Probatus and Cantia Cirrata.
- Lucius Cantius Rufinus, along with Cantia Euhodia, made a donation to Aesculapius at Rome, dating to the first or early second century.
- Gaius Cantius C. f. C. n. Secundus, together with his brother, Gaius Cantius Paternus, dedicated a tomb found at Tresques to their father, Gaius Cantius Servatus.
- Lucius Cantius Secundus, named in a sepulchral inscription from Aquileia, dating to the first half of the first century.
- Lucius Cantius Secundus, dedicated a tomb in Noricum, found at present-day Graz, and dating to the second half of the first century, for his family, including his wife, Cantia Bonia, and daughter, Cantia Boniata.
- Lucius Cantius L. f. Secundus, buried at Parentium in Venetia and Histria, was honoured with a public funeral. A Lucius Cantius Septimianus mentioned in the inscription may have been his freedman.
- Lucius Cantius L. l. Septimianus, a freedman named in the funerary inscription of Lucius Cantius Secundus, perhaps his former master, at Parentium.
- Gaius Cantius C. f. Servatus, dedicated a tomb found at Tresques to his father, Gaius Cantius Paternus, and in turn buried by his sons, Gaius Cantius Secundus and Gaius Cantius Paternus.
- Lucius Cantius Verus, a priest of Jupiter Optimus Maximus at Aquileia, during the mid-first century.

== See also ==
- List of Roman gentes

== Bibliography ==
- Titus Livius (Livy), History of Rome.
- Dictionary of Greek and Roman Biography and Mythology, William Smith, ed., Little, Brown and Company, Boston (1849).
- Theodor Mommsen et alii, Corpus Inscriptionum Latinarum (The Body of Latin Inscriptions, abbreviated CIL), Berlin-Brandenburgische Akademie der Wissenschaften (1853–present).
- René Cagnat et alii, L'Année épigraphique (The Year in Epigraphy, abbreviated AE), Presses Universitaires de France (1888–present).
- La Carte Archéologique de la Gaule (Archaeological Map of Gaul, abbreviated CAG), Académie des Inscriptions et Belles-Lettres (1931–present).
- Giovanni Battista Brusin, Inscriptiones Aquileiae (Inscriptions of Aquileia), Udine (1991–1993).
