= Ofania gens =

The gens Ofania was a minor plebeian family at Rome. Members of this gens known almost entirely from inscriptions.

== Origin ==
The nomen Ofanius belongs to a class of gentilicia apparently formed from cognomina ending in -anus, or place-names ending in -anum, although in this case neither a surname Ofanus nor a place called Ofanum is known.

== Members ==
This list includes abbreviated praenomina. For an explanation of this practice, see filiation.

- Gaius Ofanius, named in an inscription from Nursia in Samnium.
- Lucius Ofanius L. l., a freedman named in an inscription from Rome.
- Titus Ofanius T. f., named in an inscription from the present site of Spilamberto, a village just south of Mutina in northern Italy.
- Ofania Sex. l. Alexandria, a freedwoman named in a dedicatory inscription from Rome.
- Marcus Ofanius Aristionis, built a funerary monument at Rome for himself and his son, Marcus Ofanius Primus.
- Sextus Ofanius Eros, perhaps the former master of Ofania Alexandria, named in an inscription from Rome.
- Ofanius Hyginus, dedicated a monument at Peltuinum in Samnium to his brother, Quintus Tattius Vestinus, and his wife, Alledia.
- Ofania Januaria, dedicated a monument at Misenum to her friend, the soldier Valerius Saturninus, who died aged twenty-eight.
- Marcus Ofanius M. f. Primus, buried at Rome with his father, Marcus Ofanius Aristonis.
- Ofania C. f. Quarta, the wife of Gaius Papirius Masso. Her husband served as military tribune, plebeian aedile, quaesitor judex and curator frumenti.
- Gaius Ofanius C. f. Valens Cyrro, a soldier in the fifteenth legion, buried at Carnuntum, aged thirty, having served eight years.

== See also ==
- List of Roman gentes

== Bibliography ==
- Theodor Mommsen et alii, Corpus Inscriptionum Latinarum (The Body of Latin Inscriptions, abbreviated CIL), Berlin-Brandenburgische Akademie der Wissenschaften (1853–present).
- René Cagnat et alii, L'Année épigraphique (The Year in Epigraphy, abbreviated AE), Presses Universitaires de France (1888–present).
- George Davis Chase, "The Origin of Roman Praenomina", in Harvard Studies in Classical Philology, vol. VIII (1897).
- Paul von Rohden, Elimar Klebs, & Hermann Dessau, Prosopographia Imperii Romani (The Prosopography of the Roman Empire, abbreviated PIR), Berlin (1898).
- Annona Epigraphica Austriaca (Epigraphy of Austria Annual, abbreviated AEA) (1979–present).
