= Lemonia gens =

The gens Lemonia was a very ancient but obscure family at Rome. Hardly any members of this gens are known, and the name might be entirely forgotten, were it not for the fact that the Lemonii gave their name to one of the 17 Servian rustic tribes, since around 570 BC. In the middle of the sixth century BC they may have been major landholders in the region later known as the Pagus Lemonius - which was established along the via Latina - , but none of the Lemonii are known to have held any magistracies over the history of the Republic. A few Lemonii are known from inscriptions; a family of this name lived in Venetia and Histria. After their conquest Bononia and Dyrrachium were registered to the Pagus Lemonius.

== Origin ==
According to an orientation, the family date back to the time of the first legendary Roman king, Romulus, among the 100 originary families. In any case, the Lemonii were already present in the middle of the sixth century BC, as for the establishment of the Pagus Lemonius.

Maybe the name Lemonius came from the greek word λειμον (lawn); in the zone of the Pagus Lemonius there was a grass called Leimonium. According to another theory, Lemonius derived from the presence in the Pagus of a flower belonging to the species of the Anemoni, the Limonium.

== Members ==
This list includes abbreviated praenomina. For an explanation of this practice, see filiation.

- Lucius Lemonius, buried at Aquileia in Venetia and Histria.
- Lucius Lemonius T. f., built a tomb near Patavium in Venetia and Histria for a certain Pittiaca Primula.
- Quintus Lemonius Sex. f., named in an inscription from Julia Concordia in Venetia and Histria.
- Gaius Lemonius C. f. Mollo, buried at Patavium.

== See also ==
- List of Roman gentes

== Bibliography ==
- Theodor Mommsen et alii, Corpus Inscriptionum Latinarum (The Body of Latin Inscriptions, abbreviated CIL), Berlin-Brandenburgische Akademie der Wissenschaften (1853–present).
- René Cagnat et alii, L'Année épigraphique (The Year in Epigraphy, abbreviated AE), Presses Universitaires de France (1888–present).
- Fulviomario Broilo, Iscrizioni Lapidarie Latine del Museo Nazionale Concordiese di Portogruaro (I a.C. – III d.C.) (Latin Lapidary Inscriptions from the National Museum of Concordia at Portogruaro, 1st century BC – 3rd century AD, abbreviated ILLConcordia), Bretschneider, Rome (1980–1984).
- Giovanni Battista Brusin, Inscriptiones Aquileiae (Inscriptions of Aquileia, abbreviated InscrAqu), Udine (1991–1993).
- Timothy J. Cornell, The Beginnings of Rome: Italy and Rome from the Bronze Age to the Punic Wars (c. 1000–264 BC), Routledge, London (1995).
