= Sabellia gens =

The gens Sabellia was an obscure plebeian family at ancient Rome. Few members of this gens are mentioned in history, and none of them achieved any of the higher offices of the Roman state. The most famous of this family was Sabellius of Ptolemais in Pentapolis, the author of the so-called Sabellian Heresy. Other Sabellii are known from inscriptions.

== Origin ==
The nomen Sabellius belongs to a class of gentilicia typically formed directly from cognomina ending in -illus and -ellus, typically diminutive suffixes. The surname Sabellus referred to a member of the Oscan-speaking peoples of central and southern Italy, particularly the Sabines, Marsi, Samnites, and their relatives, and thus the name belongs to a common type of cognomen derived from the names of peoples and places of origin.

== Branches and cognomina ==
The only cognomina known from this gens were Primus, first, a surname that usually indicated the eldest of a group of siblings, and Dilectus, dear or beloved. There is no evidence that either of these represented distinct families of the Sabellii.

== Members ==
This list includes abbreviated praenomina. For an explanation of this practice, see filiation.

- Lucius Sabellius, prosecuted by Lucius Caesulenus, a famous speaker, under the lex Aquilia, for unlawfully damaging the property of another. The young Cicero heard Caesulenus' accusation, which he thought remarkable for the way in which he exaggerated the facts to characterize Sabellius as the most wretched type of villain.
- Lucius Sabellius Ɔ. l. Primus, a freedman, and the husband of Furfania Tertia, named in an inscription from Canusium in Apulia.
- Sabellia Ɔ. l. Salvia, a freedwoman named in an inscription from Canusium.
- Gaius Sabellius Dilectus, buried at Cirta in Numidia, aged ninety.
- Sabellius, apparently a resident of Ptolemais, where he was an influential leader of the early Church about the middle of the third century. (Note: Timotheus, presbyter of Byzantium, calls Sabellius bishop of the Pentapolis, and distinguishes him from Sabellius the Libyan, but without evidence. Abulpharagius calls him a presbyter of Byzantium, but this is contradicted by all of the evidence.) He taught that the Trinity represented three aspects of one unified God, rather than three separate persons. This belief was strongly opposed by Dionysius of Alexandria, and eventually rejected by the Church Fathers.

== See also ==
- List of Roman gentes

== Bibliography ==
- Marcus Tullius Cicero, Brutus.
- Dictionary of Greek and Roman Biography and Mythology, William Smith, ed., Little, Brown and Company, Boston (1849).
- Theodor Mommsen et alii, Corpus Inscriptionum Latinarum (The Body of Latin Inscriptions, abbreviated CIL), Berlin-Brandenburgische Akademie der Wissenschaften (1853–present).
- René Cagnat et alii, L'Année épigraphique (The Year in Epigraphy, abbreviated AE), Presses Universitaires de France (1888–present).
- George Davis Chase, "The Origin of Roman Praenomina", in Harvard Studies in Classical Philology, vol. VIII, pp. 103–184 (1897).
- John C. Traupman, The New College Latin & English Dictionary, Bantam Books, New York (1995).
