= Segulia gens =

Ancient Roman family

The gens Segulia was an obscure plebeian family at ancient Rome, which flourished from the end of the Republic to the third century AD. A number of this gens lived at Ostia and Portus, where they were engaged in the shipbuilding trade. Hardly any of the Segulii are mentioned in history, but several are known from inscriptions.

== Origin ==
The nomen Segulius belongs to a large class of gentilicia formed from other names ending in diminutive suffixes such as -ilus and -ulus. It was probably derived from a cognomen Segulus, of uncertain meaning.

== Praenomina ==
The main praenomina of the Segulii were Marcus and Gaius, two of the most common names throughout all periods of Roman history. The more distinctive Decimus is known from one inscription.

== Branches and cognomina ==
The only cognomen of the Segulii encountered under the Republic was Labeo, a common surname originally indicating someone with noticeably thick or prominent lips. A variety of surnames are encountered in imperial times, many of which were the original names of freedmen who assumed Roman names upon their manumission; none of them appear to represent distinct families.

== Members ==
This list includes abbreviated praenomina. For an explanation of this practice, see filiation.

- Segulius Labeo, informed Decimus Brutus of Octavian's response to a supposed epigram of Cicero's in 43 BC. Brutus' letter to Cicero indicates his suspicion that Labeo might have invented the episode, or the epigram; in reply Cicero does not deny saying it, but he calls Labeo the most worthless of men.
- Segulia C. l. Flora, a freedwoman buried at Narnia in Umbria, in the latter half of the first century AD, or the first half of the second, with a monument from her husband, Lucius Cornelius Communis.
- Marcus Segulius, one of the municipal officials at Ostia in Latium, in AD 145.
- Segulius Martialis, named in a second-century inscription from Ostia.
- Segulius Felicissimus, probably a member of the shipwrights' guild at Ostia in AD 165.
- Marcus Segulius Vitalio, a member of the shipwrights' guild at Ostia in AD 192.
- Segulius Chresimus, named in an inscription from Ostia, dating to AD 198.
- Segulius Spanus, named in an inscription from Ostia, dating to AD 198.

=== Undated Segulii ===
- Segulia, named in a funerary inscription from Ostia.
- Gaius Segulius Alexander, buried in a family sepulchre at Hipponium in Bruttium, along with Segulius Camtiflanus Alexander, Gaius Segulius Amillus, and Mallia Zotiniu.
- Decimus Segulius Alexsa, an aurifex, or goldsmith, named in an inscription from Forum Novum in Sabinum.
- Gaius Segulius Amillus, buried in a family sepulchre at Hipponium, aged twenty-seven, along with Gaius Segulius Alexander, Segulius Camtiflanus Alexander, and Mallia Zotiniu.
- Segulius Anthus, named in an inscription from Rome.
- Marcus Segulius Aristobulus, a freedman named in an inscription from Ariminum in Cisalpine Gaul.
- Marcus Segulius Attalus, a freedman named in an inscription from Ariminum.
- Gaius Segulius C. l. Belavus, a freedman named in an inscription from Rome.
- Segulius C. f. Camtiflanus Alexander, perhaps a freedman, buried in a family sepulchre at Hipponium, together with Gaius Segulius Alexander, Gaius Segulius Amillus, and Mallia Zotiniu.
- Segulius Crescens, a member of the shipwrights' guild at Portus in Latium.
- Marcus Segulius Herm[...], a freedman named in an inscription from Ariminum.
- Segulius Maximus, a soldier in the seventh cohort of the vigiles at Rome, serving in the century of Secundus.
- Marcus Segulius Ɔ. l. Menecrates, a freedman named in an inscription from Rome.

== See also ==
- List of Roman gentes

== Bibliography ==
- Marcus Tullius Cicero, Epistulae ad Familiares.
- Dictionary of Greek and Roman Biography and Mythology, William Smith, ed., Little, Brown and Company, Boston (1849).
- Theodor Mommsen et alii, Corpus Inscriptionum Latinarum (The Body of Latin Inscriptions, abbreviated CIL), Berlin-Brandenburgische Akademie der Wissenschaften (1853–present).
- Bullettino della Commissione Archeologica Comunale in Roma (Bulletin of the Municipal Archaeological Commission of Rome, abbreviated BCAR), (1872–present).
- René Cagnat et alii, L'Année épigraphique (The Year in Epigraphy, abbreviated AE), Presses Universitaires de France (1888–present).
- George Davis Chase, "The Origin of Roman Praenomina", in Harvard Studies in Classical Philology, vol. VIII, pp. 103–184 (1897).
- Old Penn Weekly Review, Philadelphia (1915).
