= Octavena gens =

Ancient Roman family

The gens Octavena was an obscure plebeian family at Rome. The gens is known primarily from a single individual, the jurist Octavenus, cited by a number of later authorities, although several other Octaveni are known from inscriptions.

== Members ==
- Octavenus, a jurist, who probably lived in the mid-first century AD. He is cited by a number of authorities, including Valens, Pomponius, Paulus, and Ulpian.
- Titus Octavenus Gratus, a freedman and manufacturer of roof tiles dating to AD 123, found at several towns in Italy.
- Quintus Octavenus Hymnus, named in an inscription from Hispania Citerior.
- Octavena Pia, named in an inscription from Ostia.
- Octavenus Pius, named in an inscription from Ostia.
- Caninia Octavena, buried at Cirta in Numidia, aged twenty-seven years, three months.

== See also ==
- List of Roman gentes

== Bibliography ==
- Digesta seu Pandectae (The Digest).
- Dictionary of Greek and Roman Biography and Mythology, William Smith, ed., Little, Brown and Company, Boston (1849).
- Theodor Mommsen et alii, Corpus Inscriptionum Latinarum (The Body of Latin Inscriptions, abbreviated CIL), Berlin-Brandenburgische Akademie der Wissenschaften (1853–present).
- Paul von Rohden, Elimar Klebs, & Hermann Dessau, Prosopographia Imperii Romani (The Prosopography of the Roman Empire, abbreviated PIR), Berlin (1898).
- Herbert Bloch, "Supplement to volume XV.1 of the Corpus Inscriptionum Latinarum", Harvard University Press (1948).
