= Mustia gens =

The gens Mustia was a minor plebeian family at Rome. Members of this gens are first mentioned in the final decades of the Republic, and at least some were of equestrian rank. However, few of the family are recorded outside of inscriptions.

== Members ==
This list includes abbreviated praenomina. For an explanation of this practice, see filiation.

- Mustius, an eques and publican, whose stepson and ward, Marcus Junius, was defrauded by Verres during the latter's praetorship in 75 BC. On another occasion, the circumstances of which have been forgotten, Cicero spoke in Mustius' defense, but his speech has been lost.
- Mustius, an architect, and a friend of Pliny the Younger.
- Titus Mustius C. f. Hostilius Fabricius Medulla Augurinus, praetor during the reign of Trajan.
- Quintus Mustius Priscus, consul suffectus in AD 145.

== See also ==
- List of Roman gentes

== Bibliography ==
- Marcus Tullius Cicero, In Verrem.
- Pseudo-Asconius, Commentarius in Oratorio Ciceronis in Verrem (Commentary on Cicero's In Verrem), ed. Orelli.
- Gaius Plinius Caecilius Secundus (Pliny the Younger), Epistulae (Letters).
- Dictionary of Greek and Roman Biography and Mythology, William Smith, ed., Little, Brown and Company, Boston (1849).
- Paul von Rohden, Elimar Klebs, & Hermann Dessau, Prosopographia Imperii Romani (The Prosopography of the Roman Empire, abbreviated PIR), Berlin (1898).
