= Sinnia gens =

Ancient Roman family

The gens Sinnia was an obscure plebeian family at ancient Rome. The most famous member of this gens was undoubtedly the grammarian Sinnius Capito, a contemporary of Varro, who lived toward the end of the Republic. Other Sinnii are known from inscriptions.

== Members ==
This list includes abbreviated praenomina. For an explanation of this practice, see filiation.

- Sinnia, the wife of Scapula, mother of Consus, and grandmother of Flavia, mentioned in an inscription from Histonium in Samnium, dating to the last years of the first century BC. The inscription commemorates the family of Publius Paquius Scaeva, the husband of Flavia, who after a long string of appointments was named proconsul of Cyprus.
- Sinnia, the wife of Consus, and mother of Flavia, mentioned in a late first-century BC inscription from Histonium. As her mother-in-law shared the same name, she was probably related to her husband, just as her daughter was related to her husband, the senator Publius Paquius Scaeva.
- Sinnius, a member of the bodyguard of Nero Claudius Drusus, named in a Roman inscription from the first half of the first century AD.
- Sextus Sinnius, named in an inscription from Arelate in Gallia Narbonensis.
- Sinnius Capito, a grammarian of the first century BC, whose scholarly works and letters were cited by authorities such as Sextus Pompeius Festus, Aulus Gellius, and Verrius Flaccus.
- Sinnia L. l. Clarilla, a freedwoman buried at Rome during the first half of the first century AD.
- Sinnius Nicaris, named in an inscription from Caelia in Hispania Baetica.

== See also ==
- List of Roman gentes

== Bibliography ==
- August Pauly, Georg Wissowa, et alii, Realencyclopädie der Classischen Altertumswissenschaft (Scientific Encyclopedia of the Knowledge of Classical Antiquities, abbreviated RE or PW), J. B. Metzler, Stuttgart (1894–1980).
- Paul von Rohden, Elimar Klebs, & Hermann Dessau, Prosopographia Imperii Romani (The Prosopography of the Roman Empire, abbreviated PIR), Berlin (1898).
- La Carte Archéologique de la Gaule (Archaeological Map of Gaul, abbreviated CAG), Académie des Inscriptions et Belles-Lettres (1931–present).
- Julián González, Inscripciones Romanas de la Provincia de Cadiz (Roman Inscriptions from the Province of Cádiz), Cadiz (1982).
