= Obultronia gens =

The gens Obultronia was an obscure plebeian family at Rome. Most members of this gens are known only from inscriptions, especially a group from Casinum in Latium, and another from Salona in Dalmatia.

== Members ==
This list includes abbreviated praenomina. For an explanation of this practice, see filiation.

- Obultronia, erected a monument to Obultronius Lyrasus.
- Aulus Obultronius Beryllus, named in an inscription from Salona in Dalmatia.
- Obultronia Concordia, buried in Dalmatia, aged seven.
- Obultronia Corinthia, the foster-mother of Publius Coelius Quintianus, a child buried at Salona, aged three years and nine months.
- Marcus Obultronius Cultellus, praefectus fabrum, named in a dedicatory inscription from Casinum, addressed to the divine Claudius.
- Marcus Obultronius M. f. Cultellus, possibly the same as the prefect, was one of the duumvirs at Casinum.
- Obultronius Eucarpus, erected a monument to his daughter, Concordia.
- Obultronia Fortunata, the sister of Clodius Zoillus, buried at Salona, aged thirty-two.
- Aulus Obultronius Gratus, one of the severi Mercuriales (Note: Seviri (sexviri), in this case a college of six priests of Mercury, although the inscription only includes five names.) at Narona in Dalmatia.
- Aulus Obultronius Hermias, erected a monument to his son at Salona.
- Obultronius A. f. Hermias, buried at Salona.
- Obultronius Lyrasus, buried at Rome, aged eighteen.
- Obultronia Nicia, named in an inscription from Salona.
- Obultronia Prisca, the mother of Lucius Staldius Priscus, one of the duumvirs of Casinum.
- Obultronia M. l. Romana, a freedwoman named in an inscription from Salona.
- Obultronius Sabinus, quaestor aerarii in AD 56. Helvidius Priscus, One of the tribunes of the plebs, carried on a private feud with Sabinus, accusing him of misappropriating treasury funds, resulting in the emperor Nero giving this traditional responsibility of the quaestors to a group of prefects. In AD 68, Sabinus was unjustly put to death by Galba in Spain.

== See also ==
- List of Roman gentes

== Bibliography ==
- Publius Cornelius Tacitus, Annales, Historiae.
- Dictionary of Greek and Roman Biography and Mythology, William Smith, ed., Little, Brown and Company, Boston (1849).
- Paul von Rohden, Elimar Klebs, & Hermann Dessau, Prosopographia Imperii Romani (The Prosopography of the Roman Empire, abbreviated PIR), Berlin (1898).
