= Nasidiena gens =

The gens Nasidiena was an obscure plebeian family at Rome. The gens is best known from Nasidienus Rufus, a wealthy eques whose dinner given for Maecenas is satirized by Horace.

== Origin ==
The nomen Nasidienus probably belongs to a class of names deriving from other gentilicia, in this case perhaps Nasidius. Such names were not very characteristic of Latin nomina, but were quite common in Picenum, suggesting that the Nasidieni may originally have come from that region of Italy.

== Members ==
- Nasidienus Rufus, an eques whom Maecenas favoured with his company, and whose dinner was a subject of Horace's ridicule. The name may well have been an alias invented by Horace to avoid offending the man in question.
- Nasidienus, mentioned by Martial.
- Lucius Nasidienus Agrippa, a military tribune with the fourteenth legion at Colonia Claudia Ara Agrippinensium, in Germania Inferior.

== See also ==
- List of Roman gentes

== Bibliography ==
- Quintus Horatius Flaccus (Horace), Satirae (Satires).
- Marcus Valerius Martialis (Martial), Epigrammata (Epigrams).
- Dictionary of Greek and Roman Biography and Mythology, William Smith, ed., Little, Brown and Company, Boston (1849).
- Theodor Mommsen et alii, Corpus Inscriptionum Latinarum (The Body of Latin Inscriptions, abbreviated CIL), Berlin-Brandenburgische Akademie der Wissenschaften (1853–present).
- George Davis Chase, "The Origin of Roman Praenomina", in Harvard Studies in Classical Philology, vol. VIII (1897).
- Paul von Rohden, Elimar Klebs, & Hermann Dessau, Prosopographia Imperii Romani (The Prosopography of the Roman Empire, abbreviated PIR), Berlin (1898).
