= Matrinia gens =

The gens Matrinia was a plebeian family at Rome. Members of this gens are first mentioned toward the end of the second century BC. They belonged to the equestrian class. Several of them are known through the writings of Cicero, while others are mentioned in inscriptions from Umbria and Etruria.

== Origin ==
According to Cicero, Titus Matrinius received Roman citizenship from Gaius Marius, one of the legendary figures in Roman history, placing him toward the end of the second century BC, or the beginning of the first.

== Praenomina ==
The chief praenomina of the Matrinii seem to have been Lucius, Manius, and Gnaeus. Lucius and Gnaeus were very common names, but Manius was much more distinctive. There are two examples of the common praenomen Gaius, and a father and son named Publius, also a very common name. Titus and Decimus, found among the Matrinii known to Cicero, are not repeated among the Matrinii known from surviving inscriptions.

== Members ==
This list includes abbreviated praenomina. For an explanation of this practice, see filiation.

- Titus Matrinius enrolled as a Roman citizen by Gaius Marius, was later accused by Lucius Antistius.
- Gaius Matrinius, an eques living in Sicily, had his estates plundered by Verres while he was attending to business at Rome.
- Decimus Matrinius, a scribe employed by the aediles, was defended by Cicero about 69 BC.
- Lucius Matrinius, father of Lucius Matrinius Secundus.
- Lucius Matrinius L. f. Secundus, lived fourteen years, according to a funerary inscription at Rome.
- Manius Matrinius, the former master of Manius Matrinius.
- Manius Matrinius M'. l., a freedman, buried with his concubine, Alexa, at Rome.
- Publius Matrinius Sassula, among the colonists sent to Sutrium by the triumvirs in 41 BC.
- Publius Matrinius P. f. Sassula, among the colonists sent to Sutrium in 41 BC.
- Lucius Matrinius, among the colonists sent to Sutrium in 41 BC.
- Manius Matrinius Cn. f., buried at Forum Cassii with his wife, Cosinia, and their sons, Gnaeus and Manius.
- Gnaeus Matrinius M'. f., buried at Forum Cassii with his parents and brother, Manius.
- Manius Matrinius M'. f., buried at Forum Cassii with his parents and brother, Gnaeus.
- Lucius Matrinius, the former master of Lucius Matrinius Diochares and his wife, Matrinia Aphelea.
- Lucius Matrinius L. l. Diochares, a freedman, buried at Spoletium with his wife, Matrinia Aphelea.
- Matrinia L. l. Aphelea, a freedwoman, buried with her husband, Lucius Matrinius Diochares, at Spoletium.
- Gnaeus Matrinius, the former master of Gnaeus Matrinius Philadelphus and Matrinia Thaïs.
- Gnaeus Matrinius Cn. l. Philadelphus, a freedman, buried at Spoletium with his wife, Matrinia Thaïs.
- Matrinia Cn. l. Thaïs, a freedwoman, buried with her husband, Gnaeus Matrinius Philadelphus, at Spoletium.
- Gaius Matrinius Primus, named in a libationary inscription found at Embken in Germania Inferior.

== See also ==
- List of Roman gentes

== Bibliography ==
- Marcus Tullius Cicero, In Verrem, Pro Balbo, Pro Cluentio.
- Dictionary of Greek and Roman Biography and Mythology, William Smith, ed., Little, Brown and Company, Boston (1849).
- Theodor Mommsen et alii, Corpus Inscriptionum Latinarum (The Body of Latin Inscriptions, abbreviated CIL), Berlin-Brandenburgische Akademie der Wissenschaften (1853–present).
