= Reginia gens =

The gens Reginia was an obscure plebeian family at ancient Rome. Few members of this gens are mentioned in history, but several are known from inscriptions.

== Origin ==
The nomen Reginius belongs to a class of gentilicia formed from cognomina ending in -inus. Reginus, the surname and probable root of this nomen, belongs to a type of cognomen derived from the names of places, in this case the ancient city of Rhegium in Bruttium, presumable the place where the ancestors of the Reginii lived.

== Members ==
This list includes abbreviated praenomina. For an explanation of this practice, see filiation.

- Gaius Reginius, a soldier in the eighth cohort of the praetorian guard, who placed a monument at Rome in memory of his colleague, Gaius Julius Verus.
- Gaius Reginius December, built a monument for his wife, Cintusmina, the daughter of Magionus, at Durocortorum in Gallia Belgica.
- Marcus Reginius M. f. Eutyches, a native of Lycia, was a soldier in the twelfth urban cohort at Rome in AD 197, serving the century of Romanus.
- Reginia Grata, built a tomb at Cortona in Etruria for her husband, Aulus Gellius Etruscus.
- Reginius Justinus, a probably a military tribune, named in a libationary inscription dedicated to Neptune, found at Banna in Britain.
- Reginia Maxima, buried at Rome with her husband, Publius Vibius Marianus, a decorated soldier, formerly centurion primus pilus of the third legion, in a tomb dedicated by their daughters, Julia Dertona and Vibia Maria Maxima.
- Reginia Paterna, made an offering to Semele at Colonia Claudia Ara Agrippinensium in Germania Inferior.
- Quintus Reginius Silvanus, buried at Lactora in Gallia Aquitania, together with his wife, Julia Comenua.
- Reginia Titula, a native of Arabia Petraea, buried at Rome, aged twenty-nine, with a monument from her husband, Aurelius Septimius.

== See also ==
- List of Roman gentes

== Bibliography ==
- Theodor Mommsen et alii, Corpus Inscriptionum Latinarum (The Body of Latin Inscriptions, abbreviated CIL), Berlin-Brandenburgische Akademie der Wissenschaften (1853–present).
- René Cagnat et alii, L'Année épigraphique (The Year in Epigraphy, abbreviated AE), Presses Universitaires de France (1888–present).
- Paul von Rohden, Elimar Klebs, & Hermann Dessau, Prosopographia Imperii Romani (The Prosopography of the Roman Empire, abbreviated PIR), Berlin (1898).
- John C. Traupman, The New College Latin & English Dictionary, Bantam Books, New York (1995).
