= Praeconia gens =

Plebeian family of ancient Rome

The gens Praeconia, occasionally written Preconia, was an obscure plebeian family at ancient Rome. No members of this gens are mentioned in history, but a few are known from inscriptions.

== Origin ==
The nomen Praeconius belongs to a large class of gentilicia derived from cognomina ending in -o. The root, praeco, a herald, belongs to a class of surnames derived from occupations. The Praeconii may have come from Umbria, since all of those found in Italy are known from inscriptions of Umbria or adjacent parts of Etruria.

== Praenomina ==
The Praeconii used a variety of common praenomina, including Gaius, Lucius, Marcus, Publius, and Quintus, all of which were among the most abundant names at every period of Roman history.

== Members ==
This list includes abbreviated praenomina. For an explanation of this practice, see filiation.

- Gaius Praeconius L. f., named in an inscription from Perusia in Etruria.
- Quintus Preconius, buried at Caldis, a settlement northwest of Cirta in Numidia, aged fifty-one.
- Praeconia P. l. Hilara, a freedwoman, named in an inscription from Mevania in Umbria.
- Marcus Praeconius Jucundus, a native of Sirmium in Pannonia Inferior, was a tubicen, or hornist, serving in the fifteenth legion, named in an inscription from Carnuntum in Pannonia Superior.
- Praeconia C. f. Posilla, wife of Sextus Artorius, and mother of Sextus and Lucius Artorius, and Artoria Secunda, who built a tomb for her parents and brothers at Ameria in Umbria, early in the first century AD.
- Gaius Praeconius P. f. Ventilius Magnus, an eques, and the owner of an impressive garden at Parma in Etruria, mentioned in an inscription from the latter part of the first century, or the early part of the second.
- Quintus Preconius Verus, a native of Cremona, an Etruscan city in Cisalpine Gaul, serving in the praetorian guard at Rome, in AD 144.

== See also ==
- List of Roman gentes

== Bibliography ==
- Dictionary of Greek and Roman Biography and Mythology, William Smith, ed., Little, Brown and Company, Boston (1849).
- Theodor Mommsen et alii, Corpus Inscriptionum Latinarum (The Body of Latin Inscriptions, abbreviated CIL), Berlin-Brandenburgische Akademie der Wissenschaften (1853–present).
- René Cagnat et alii, L'Année épigraphique (The Year in Epigraphy, abbreviated AE), Presses Universitaires de France (1888–present).
- George Davis Chase, "The Origin of Roman Praenomina", in Harvard Studies in Classical Philology, vol. VIII (1897).
- John C. Traupman, The New College Latin & English Dictionary, Bantam Books, New York (1995).
