= Priscia gens =

The gens Priscia was an obscure plebeian family at ancient Rome. No members of this gens are mentioned in history, but several are known from inscriptions. A family of this name settled at Virunum in Noricum.

== Origin ==
The nomen Priscius is derived from the common cognomen Prīscus, old or elder.

== Praenomina ==
The praenomina associated with the Priscii are Gaius, Titus, Publius, and Quintus, all of which were among the most common names throughout Roman history.

== Members ==
This list includes abbreviated praenomina. For an explanation of this practice, see filiation.

- Priscia, named in an inscription from Ateste in Venetia and Histria.
- Priscia, named in a list of heirs from Narbo in Gallia Narbonensis.
- Priscia, the wife of Tertianus, named in an inscription from Virunum in Noricum.
- Priscius, buried at Rome, aged eight years, and nine months, on the sixteenth day before the Kalends of February.
- Priscius, named in an inscription from Colonia Claudia Ara Agrippinensium in Germania Inferior.
- Gaius Priscius C. f., named in an inscription from Rome, dating to AD 184.
- Titus Priscius, named in an inscription from Agedincum in Gallia Lugdunensis, dating to the reign of Trajan.
- Priscia Albina, one of the wives of Julius Secundinus, buried in his family sepulchre at Flavia Solva in Noricum.
- Priscia Amanda, the wife of Publius Cestus, buried at Comum in Cisalpine Gaul, aged fifty-five years, five months.
- Priscia Calliope, wife of Priscius Marcianus, whom she buried at Durocortorum in Gallia Belgica.
- Gaius Priscius Crescentinus, named in an inscription from the temple of Mithras at Virunum.
- Priscius Eustochus, a freedman, dedicated a tomb at Lugdunum to his companion, Lucius Sabinius Cassianus, together with Cassianus' widow, Flavia Livia.
- Priscia C. f. Iantulla, buried at Virunum, was the sister of Priscia Prima, Quintus Priscius Priscianus, Gaius Priscius Statutus, and Publius Priscius Verecundus.
- Priscius Marcianus, buried at Durocortorum in a tomb dedicated by his wife, Priscia Calliope.
- Gaius Priscius Oppidanus, named in two inscriptions from Virunum in Noricum, one of them dating between AD 182 and 184.
- Priscia C. f. Prima, buried at Virunum, was the sister of Priscia Iantulla, Quintus Priscius Priscianus, Gaius Priscius Statutus, and Publius Priscius Verecundus.
- Quintus Priscius C. f. Priscianus, buried at Virunum, was the brother of Priscia Iantulla, Priscia Prima, Gaius Priscius Statutus, and Publius Priscius Verecundus, and the husband of Venustina.
- Priscia Restituta, donated forty thousand sestertii to the temple of Jupiter Optimus Maximus in AD 101, according to an inscription from Ligures Baebiani in Samnium
- Titus Priscius Sabinus, along with Gaius Sextilius Severus, one of the heirs of Gaius Braecius Verus, a Dalmatic soldier buried at Ravenna in Cisalpine Gaul, aged forty.
- Gaius Priscius C. f. Statutus, buried at Virunum, was the brother of Priscia Iantulla, Priscia Prima, Publius Priscius Verecundus, and Quintus Priscius Priscianus, and the husband of Barbia Venusta.
- Gaius Priscius C. l. Surio, a freedman, and husband of Septima, buried at Virunum.
- Gaius Priscius Vegetus, buried at Virunum.
- Publius Priscius C. f. Verecundus, buried at Virunum, was the brother of Priscia Iantulla, Priscia Prima, Gaius Priscius Statutus, and Quintus Priscius Priscianus.

== See also ==
- List of Roman gentes

== Bibliography ==
- Theodor Mommsen et alii, Corpus Inscriptionum Latinarum (The Body of Latin Inscriptions, abbreviated CIL), Berlin-Brandenburgische Akademie der Wissenschaften (1853–present).
- Giovanni Battista de Rossi, Inscriptiones Christianae Urbis Romanae Septimo Saeculo Antiquiores (Christian Inscriptions from Rome of the First Seven Centuries, abbreviated ICUR), Vatican Library, Rome (1857–1861, 1888).
- Ettore Pais, Corporis Inscriptionum Latinarum Supplementa Italica (Italian Supplement to the Corpus Inscriptionum Latinarum), Rome (1884).
- René Cagnat et alii, L'Année épigraphique (The Year in Epigraphy, abbreviated AE), Presses Universitaires de France (1888–present).
- George Davis Chase, "The Origin of Roman Praenomina", in Harvard Studies in Classical Philology, vol. VIII (1897).
- John C. Traupman, The New College Latin & English Dictionary, Bantam Books, New York (1995).
- Gabrielle Kremer, Antike Grabbauten in Noricum. Katalog und Auswertung von Werkstücken als Beitrag zur Rekonstruktion und Typologie (Ancient Tombs in Noricum: Catalog and Evaluation of Workpieces to Contribute to Reconstruction and Typology, abbreviated AGN), Österreichisches Archäologisches Institut, Vienna (2001).
