= Surdinia gens =

Ancient Roman family

The gens Surdinia was an obscure plebeian family at ancient Rome. Hardly any members of this gens are mentioned in ancient writers, but several are known from inscriptions.

== Origin ==
The nomen Surdinius belongs to a class of gentilicia derived from surnames ending in the diminutive suffix -inus. The root of the name, surdus, originally referred to someone deaf or dumb. As a cognomen, it belongs to a large class of surnames based on a person's physical traits or characteristics.

== Members ==
- Surdinia, the granddaughter of Horatius Martialis Rufinus, a woman of a senatorial family, named in an inscription from Vaga in Africa Proconsularis.
- Surdinia Aphrodisia, buried at Mediolanum in Transalpine Gaul.
- Surdinius Felix, a centurion in the Cohors I Sardorum, one of the auxiliae stationed in Sardinia during the latter half of the first century, or the first half of the third, together with his wife, Maximilla, dedicated a tomb at Carales for their foster son, whose name has not been preserved.
- Surdinius Gallus, met the property qualifications to join the Roman Senate in AD 47, at a time when Claudius was clearing that body of paupers. Gallus had gone to settle at Carthage, but Claudius recalled him to serve in the senate, promising to "bind him with golden fetters".
- Surdinia Rogatula, a girl buried at Sigus in Numidia, aged twelve, along with Valia Matrona, aged thirty-seven.
- Lucius Surdinius Saturninus, a soldier buried at Misenum in Campania, aged forty, having served for nineteen years, in a second-century tomb dedicated by his mother, Clodia Secunda.

== See also ==
- List of Roman gentes

== Bibliography ==
- Lucius Cassius Dio Cocceianus (Cassius Dio), Roman History.
- Dictionary of Greek and Roman Biography and Mythology, William Smith, ed., Little, Brown and Company, Boston (1849).
- Theodor Mommsen et alii, Corpus Inscriptionum Latinarum (The Body of Latin Inscriptions, abbreviated CIL), Berlin-Brandenburgische Akademie der Wissenschaften (1853–present).
- René Cagnat et alii, L'Année épigraphique (The Year in Epigraphy, abbreviated AE), Presses Universitaires de France (1888–present).
- August Pauly, Georg Wissowa, et alii, Realencyclopädie der Classischen Altertumswissenschaft (Scientific Encyclopedia of the Knowledge of Classical Antiquities, abbreviated PW), J. B. Metzler, Stuttgart (1894–1980).
- George Davis Chase, "The Origin of Roman Praenomina", in Harvard Studies in Classical Philology, vol. VIII, pp. 103–184 (1897).
- Paul von Rohden, Elimar Klebs, & Hermann Dessau, Prosopographia Imperii Romani (The Prosopography of the Roman Empire, abbreviated PIR), Berlin (1898).
- John C. Traupman, The New College Latin & English Dictionary, Bantam Books, New York (1995).
