= Jucundia gens =

Ancient Roman family

The gens Jucundia was an obscure plebeian family at ancient Rome. No members of this gens are mentioned in ancient writers, but a number are known from inscriptions.

== Origin ==
The nomen Jucundius is derived from the cognomen Jucundus, originally referring to someone pleasant or agreeable. It belongs to a class of surnames derived from the character of an individual.

== Members ==
This list includes abbreviated praenomina. For an explanation of this practice, see filiation.

- Gaius Jucundius Verus, made an offering to Jupiter at Alburnus Major in Dacia, some time in the second century.
- Tiberius Jucundius Victorinus, made an offering to Mercury, recorded in an inscription found at Großkrotzenburg, dating between AD 101 and 260.
- Jucundius Juvenalis, a cornicularius, or adjutant, in an uncertain military unit, who made an offering to Jupiter Optimus Maximus at Potaissa in Dacia, roughly between AD 150 and 270.
- Gaius Jucundius Similis, a soldier in the Legio XXX Ulpia Victrix, who made an offering to Jupiter Optimus Maximus at Bonna in Germania Inferior in AD 182.
- Jucundia Rogata, buried at Ammaedara in Africa Proconsularis, aged thirty-five, with a monument from her husband, Nonius Saturninus.
- Jucundius, named in an inscription from Gallia Belgica.
- Jucundius, named in an inscription from Novaesium in Germania Inferior.
- Marcus Jucundius Primus Vocontius, buried at Lugdunum in Gallia Lugdunensis, with a monument from his friend, Marcus Sollius Epaphroditus.
- Gaius Jucundius C. f. Severianus, dedicated a monument at Vasio in Gallia Narbonensis for his father, Gaius Jucundius Severus.
- Gaius Jucundius Severus, buried at Vasio, aged twenty-nine years, eight months, and four days, with a monument dedicated by his son, Gaius Jucundius Severianus.
- Lucius Jucundius Titullus, made an offering commemorated in an inscription found at Nestier, formerly part of Gallia Aquitania.

== See also ==
- List of Roman gentes
- Jucundus (disambiguation)

== Bibliography ==
- Theodor Mommsen et alii, Corpus Inscriptionum Latinarum (The Body of Latin Inscriptions, abbreviated CIL), Berlin-Brandenburgische Akademie der Wissenschaften (1853–present).
- René Cagnat et alii, L'Année épigraphique (The Year in Epigraphy, abbreviated AE), Presses Universitaires de France (1888–present).
- George Davis Chase, "The Origin of Roman Praenomina", in Harvard Studies in Classical Philology, vol. VIII, pp. 103–184 (1897).
- John C. Traupman, The New College Latin & English Dictionary, Bantam Books, New York (1995).
- Jochen Kütter, Graffiti auf römischer Gefäßkeramik aus Neuss, Aachen (2008).
