= Vannia gens =

Ancient Roman family

The gens Vannia or Vania was an obscure family of ancient Rome. No members of this gens are mentioned by Roman writers, but several are known from inscriptions.

== Members ==
This list includes abbreviated praenomina. For an explanation of this practice, see filiation.

- Gaius Vannius A. f., buried at Tarquinii in Etruria, in a tomb dating from the third quarter of the second century BC.
- Lucius Vanius Ɔ. l. Setus, a freedman named along with the freedwoman Vania Laudicis in a sepulchral inscription from Rome, dating from the latter half of the first century BC.
- Vania Ɔ. l. Laudicis, a freedwoman named along with the freedman Lucius Vanius Setus in a sepulchral inscription from Rome, dating from the latter half of the first century BC.
- Vannia M. f. Quarta, the wife of Publius Numisius Ligus, formerly a military tribune with the Legio III Augusta, praefectus fabrum for fifteen years, aedile, duumvir, quaestor, and patron of the municipium at Saepinum in Sabinum. Together with their son, Publius Numisius Ligur, they were interred at Saepinum, in a tomb dating from the first half of the first century, with a monument funded by the decurions of the town.
- Marcus Vannius Adjutor, one of the decurions of Colonia Claudia Ara Agrippinensium in Germania Inferior, made an offering to Liber and Hercules, commemorated in a second or third century inscription.

=== Undated Vannii ===
- Vania Prepusa L. l., a freedwoman who built a tomb at Rome for Titus Vibius.
- Publius Vannius Primus, named among a list of priests at Ostia in Latium.
- Lucius Vanius Setinus, a dossuarius jumentus, or porter, serving in the eighth cohort of an unidentified army, according to a lead inscription from Deva Victrix in Britain.

== See also ==
- List of Roman gentes

== Bibliography ==
- René Cagnat et alii, L'Année épigraphique (The Year in Epigraphy, abbreviated AE), Presses Universitaires de France (1888–present).
- Theodor Mommsen et alii, Corpus Inscriptionum Latinarum (The Body of Latin Inscriptions, abbreviated CIL), Berlin-Brandenburgische Akademie der Wissenschaften (1853–present).
- The Roman Inscriptions of Britain (abbreviated RIB), Oxford, (1990–present).
