= Nomen gentilicium =

Roman hereditary name

The nomen gentilicium (Latin pronunciation: [ɡɛntiːˈlikiũ]; or simply nomen) was a hereditary name borne by the peoples of Roman Italy and later by the citizens of the Roman Republic and the Roman Empire. It was originally the name of one's gens (family or clan) by patrilineal descent. However, as Rome expanded its frontiers and non-Roman peoples were progressively granted citizenship and concomitant nomen, the latter lost its value in indicating patrilineal ancestry.

For men, the nomen was the middle of the tria nomina ("three names"), after the praenomen and before the cognomen. For women, the nomen was often the only name used until the late Republic. For example, three members of gens Julia were Gaius Julius Caesar and his sisters Julia Major and Julia Minor ("Julia the elder" and "Julia the younger").

== History ==
The nomen gentilicium, or "gentile name" designated a Roman citizen as a member of a gens. (Note: Although this use of the term gentile has the same origin as the term used to distinguish non-Jews from the Jewish population, its meaning is purely civil and has nothing to do with ethnic or religious identity. It refers simply to a member of a gens, distinguished by his or her surname, and in this sense, the term "gentile name" is used today without any religious connotation, despite or perhaps because of the use of "Christian name" to refer to personal names. In that sense, Romanized Jews could also be gentiles, and gentiles could be Jewish. That is also the origin of the term gentleman; the association of gentlemen with courtesy developed later.) A gens, which may be translated as "race", "family", or "clan", constituted an extended Roman family, all of whom shared the same nomen and claimed descent from a common ancestor. Particularly in the early Roman Republic, the gens functioned as a state within the state, observing its own sacred rites and establishing private laws, which were binding on its members although not on the community as a whole.

Although the other peoples of Italy also possessed nomina (plural of nomen), the distinction between Romans and the non-Roman peoples of Italy disappeared as various communities were granted the Roman franchise and, after the Social War (91–87 BC), that was extended to most of Italy. Possession of the nomen gentilicium then identified a man as a Roman citizen.

The nomen was an essential element of Roman nomenclature throughout Roman history, but its usefulness as a distinguishing element declined precipitously following the Constitutio Antoniniana in the early 3rd century, which effectively granted the nomen "Aurelius" to vast numbers of newly-enfranchised citizens. Countless other "new Romans" acquired the nomina of important families in this manner during imperial times. In the 4th century, Aurelius was surpassed in number by Flavius, and other names became quite common, including Valerius, Claudius, Fabius, Julius and Junius. Those names no longer had any utility in indicating one's patrilineal ancestry (Note: Except, of course, for the actual descendants of those ancient noble houses, but as the population of the Roman Empire grew and attained social and political influence, the "old Romans" accounted for a continually-decreasing proportion of the overall populace.) and became largely perfunctory. They could be changed to indicate rank or status, and even abbreviated, (Note: Common abbreviations included Fl. for Flavius, Aur. for Aurelius, Val. for Valerius, and Cl. for Claudius.) much as praenomina had been.

Both in its original form, identifying an individual as a member of a Roman gens, and in its later form, as an indicator of status, the nomen continued to be used for several decades after the collapse of Imperial authority in the west. The last datable example of a nomen gentilicium belongs to a Julia Rogatiana, who died at Volubilis in AD 655. In the east, nomina such as Flavius continued until the early 8th century; Flavius Basilius was Pagarch of Aphrodito in Egypt in 710. (Note: Aphrodito was a pagus in the nome of Aphroditopolis; in Coptic Jkow, in Arabic Kom Ishkaw. The importance attached to the nomen Flavius as an indicator of the bearer's rank is underscored by the fact that Basilius lived more than 60 years after the Arab conquest of Egypt. Other late examples within the Byzantine Empire date to the late 8th century.)

== See also ==
- Roman naming conventions
- Agnomen
- List of Roman nomina
