= Titus Flavius Norbanus =

1st-century Roman equites, governor and praetorian prefect

Titus Flavius Norbanus was a Roman equites who was active during the reign of Domitian. He is known for his activities while holding two imperial posts: governor of Raetia, and Praetorian prefect.

Norbanus' identity has posed a problem. Until recently he was mentioned only three times in the primary sources: as "Norbanus Lappius" in the Epitome de Caesaribus; and twice as simply "Norbanus", once in a poem addressed to him by Martial, the second time by Dio Cassius in his history. A name ("Lappius Maximus") in a letter quoted by Pliny the Younger in one of his letters, was thought to apply to him. Thus he had been surmised to be Lucius Appius Maximus Norbanus, a composite identity with Aulus Bucius Lappius Maximus. Then a military diploma from Bulgaria was published in the late 1950s showing "Lappius" was likely a different person from Norbanus. That they were two different people was definitely proven by another military diploma published by Werner Eck and Andreas Pangerl in 2007, giving both his praenomen and gentilicium: "Titus Flavius". It was now clear that the author or a copyist of de Caesaribus had muddled the two men into one. In addition, Eck and Pangerl drew attention to one implication of Norbanus' complete name: these two elements imply that Norbanus was a relation to emperor Vespasian and his sons, for we find "Titus Flavius" is a common element in the names of many of their relatives.

== Governor of Raetia ==
At least as early as 13 May AD 86, Norbanus was procurator of Raetia, as attested by the military diploma published in 2007. He still held this post in January 89 when Lucius Antonius Saturninus, governor of Germania Superior, revolted against the emperor Domitian.

The reasons for Saturninus' revolt defy investigation. Both Norbanus and Aulus Bucius Lappius Maximus, governor of Germania Inferior quickly responded; Lappius Maximus with detachments of the legions under him, Norbanus with troops drawn from the four alae and eight cohortes stationed in Raetia. The two governors defeated Saturninus with his two legions before his allies the Chatti could cross the Rhine. The expert consensus is that for his loyalty at this critical moment Norbanus was rewarded with promotion to praetorian prefect, one of the three most prestigious offices an eques could aspire to.

== Praetorian prefect ==
When Norbanus entered into the office of praetorian prefect is not precisely known. Some experts suggest that he was first prefect of Egypt for a brief time. No positive confirmation of this post has been found, and there is little room to insert him into the list of governors of this province: based on the work of Guido Bastianini, there is a possible gap around the year 90 when there are no precisely dated documents attesting to either Marcus Mettius Rufus or Titus Petronius Secundus in office, and a more substantial gap of precisely dated documents in 93 between Secundus and Marcus Junius Rufus. However, in his poem, which dates to either 94 or 95, Martial mentions that Norbanus has returned to Rome after an absence of 6 years, making it unlikely that Norbanus proceeded directly from Raetia to command of the Praetorian Guard.

What is definite is that Norbanus held this office with Petronius Secundus as his colleague at the moment when the emperor Domitian was assassinated, 18 September 96. According to Dio Cassius both Norbanus and Secundus knew about the plot to kill the emperor. Why they failed to protect Domitian is unknown. Domitian, notorious for his suspicious nature, appointed loyal men to important positions, and Norbanus had proven his loyalty. Experts speculate whether Norbanus was in on the plot, stood aside to permit it to happen—or perhaps he, too, was murdered in the aftermath. What is clear, in Ronald Syme's words, is that "Norbanus slips out of historical record, and now, in October 97, a new commander, Casperius Aelianus, exploits the trouble".
