= Betutia gens =

Ancient Roman family

The gens Betutia or Betitia, occasionally in Roman writers Betucia or Beticia, was a minor plebeian family from the late Roman Republic to imperial times. It is best known from the orator Titus Betucius Barrus, much admired by Cicero, but by the second century its members had attained consular rank.

== Praenomina ==
The chief praenomina of the Betutii were Gaius, Lucius, and Marcus, which were the most common of all Roman names. A few of Betutii bore other common praenomina, including Sextus, Publius, Gnaeus, Titus, and Quintus. An early inscription from Bovianum Vetus in Samnium shows that at least one family of Betitii used Manius, while a filiation from the early second century gives an example of Numerius.

== Branches and cognomina ==
The only distinct family of the Betucii under the Republic bore the surname Barrus, which was in use from at least the late second century BC to the first century AD. During the first century, a family of Betitii from Aeclanum in Samnium came to prominence, bearing the surname Pius, perhaps originally Pietas. This family is still found in the early third century, and perhaps was ancestral to the Betitius Perpetuus of the early fourth century.

== Members ==
This list includes abbreviated praenomina. For an explanation of this practice, see filiation.

=== Betutii Barri ===
- Lucius Betucius Barrus, in 113 BC accused the Vestal Virgin Aemilia of breaking her vow of chastity. Aemilia was defended in court by Lucius Licinius Crassus.
- Titus Betucius Barrus, a native of Asculum in Picenum. Cicero described him as the most eloquent of all orators outside of Rome. He also delivered a famous speech at Rome against Quintus Servilius Caepio, who was slain during the Social War.
- Publius Betutius P. f. Barrus, named in a first-century funerary inscription from Peltuinum in Sabinum.

=== Others ===
- Gaius Betutius M. f., named as a witness in an inscription from Aquinum in Latium, dating from the latter half of the first century BC or the first half of the first century AD, along with the freedman Publius Alfius Philomusus.
- Betutia M. l. Privata, a freedwoman, buried at Narbo in Gallia Narbonensis, in a tomb built by her husband, the freedman V[...]ius Anterotis Varus, for himself and his wife, dating from the late first century BC, or the early first century AD.
- Marcus Betutius C. f., dedicated a tomb at Venusia in Samnium, dating from the first half of the first century, for the freedwoman Flavia Philematio.
- Manius Betitius, at least one, or possibly several individuals buried along with Betitia Demetria and perhaps another Betitia, in a family sepulchre at Bovianum Vetus in Samnium, dating between the Augustan era and the end of the first century.
- Betitia Demetria, buried along with one or more persons named Manius Betitius, and perhaps another Betitia, in a family sepulchre at Bovianum Vetus, dating between the Augustan era and the end of the first century.

==== First century ====
- Betutius Venustus, named in a sepulchral inscription from Asculum Picenum, dating from the early first century.
- Betutia Q. l. Fausta, a freedwoman, named along with several other freedmen and women, in a sepulchral inscription from Rome, dating from the first half of the first century.
- Betutia T. l. Festa, a freedwoman named, along with the freedman Titus Betutius Karus and various other freedmen and women, in a sepulchral inscription from Aquileia in Venetia and Histria, dating from the first half of the first century.
- Betutia Sex. l. Fusca, a freedwoman buried at Aquileia, in a tomb dating from the first half of the first century. She may be the same Betutia Fusca who dedicated a tomb to Sextus Betutius Vienna and others.
- Titus Betutius T. l. Karus, a freedman named, along with the freedwoman Betutia Festa and various other freedmen and women, in a sepulchral inscription from Aquileia, dating from the first half of the first century.
- Publius Betutius C. f., buried in a first-century tomb at Viola in Liguria, aged thirty-five.
- Marcus Betutius M. l. Diligens, a freedman named in a first-century inscription from Bergomum in Cisalpine Gaul.
- Gaius Betitius Eunus, left a legacy in his will that was used to build the first-century tomb of Gaius Vibuleius Gallus.
- Gaius Betutius Eutychetus, one of the seviri Augustales at Peltuinum, buried in a first-century tomb at Furfo, dedicated by his children, Betutius Maximus and Betutia Maxima.
- Gaius Betutius Encolpus, made an offering to Mercury, recorded in a first-century inscription from Sirmio in Venetia and Histria.
- Marcus Betutius M. l. Faustus, a freedman, dedicated a first-century sepulchre at Bergomum for himself and the freedwomen Sophe and Minicia Crocis.
- Marcus Betutius M. l. Inachus, a freedman, built a first-century tomb at Bergomum for himself and the freedwoman Cornelia Alenda.
- Betutia C. f. Maxima, along with her brother, Betutius Maximus, dedicated a first-century tomb at Furfo for their father, Gaius Betutius Eutychetus.
- (Gaius) Betutius C. f. Maximus, along with his sister, Betutia Maxima, dedicated a first-century tomb at Furfo for their father, Gaius Betutius Eutychetus.
- Betutia Ɔ. l. Quarta, a freedwoman buried at Albingaunum in Liguria, in a first-century tomb built by her son, Publius Granius Hyla, a freedman and one of the sodales Augustales, for himself and his mother.
- Mania L. f. Betutia Pro[...], named in a first-century inscription as the flaminica, or wife of the flamen of the imperial cult at Ticinum.
- Gnaeus Betutius Primus, one of the municipal officials at Casilinum in Campania in AD 15.
- Sextus Betutius Sex. f. Vienna, signifer of the Legio IX Hispana, buried at Aquileia, in a tomb dating from the middle part of the first century, built by his client, the freedwoman Betutia Fusca for herself, her patron Vienna, the freedman Sextus Betutius Secundus, and Marcus Salvius Primus.
- Betutia Sex. l. Fusca, a freedwoman, dedicated a tomb at Aquileia, dating from the middle part of the first century, for herself and Sextus Betutius Vienna, her patron, her fellow freedman Sextus Betutius Secundus, and her friend, Marcus Salvius Primus.
- Sextus Betutius Sex. l. Secundus, a freedman, buried at Aquileia, in a tomb dating from the middle part of the first century, built by the freedwoman Betutia Fusca, for herself, Secundus, her patron, Sextus Betutius Vienna, and friend, Marcus Salvius Primus.
- Lucius Betutius Justus, named in an inscription from Pompeii in Campania.
- Lucius Betitius Placidus, named on ceramic tiles from Pompeii.
- Lucius Betutius Q. f. Niger, a soldier in the second cohort of the Praetorian Guard, buried at Pompeii, aged twenty, having served for two years, in a tomb dating between AD 60 and 79.
- Gaius Betitius C. f. Pietas, prefect of the Cohors I Flavia Commagenorum, a mounted Auxiliary unit, later served as quaestor and one of the municipal duumvirs, probably at Aeclanum in Samnium, where he was buried in a late first- or early second-century tomb, dedicated by his son, Betitius Pius, and wife, Neratia Procilla.
- (Gaius) Betitius C. f. Pius, the son of Gaius Betitius Pietas and Neratia Procilla, together with his mother, dedicated a late first- or early second-century tomb at Aeclanum for his father.
- Gaius Betitius Secundus, dedicated a tomb at Beneventum in Samnium, dating between the late first century and the middle of the second, for his wife, Neratia Jucunda.

==== Second century ====
- Gaius Betutius, buried at Emerita in Lusitania, aged forty, in a second-century tomb built by his mother, Asperinia.
- Betutia Helias, buried at Aeclanum, in a tomb dedicated by Marcianus, probably her husband.
- Betitia N. l. Pontina, a freedwoman buried at Aeclanum, in a second-century tomb built by her husband, Quintus.
- Betutia Procula, along with her father- and mother-in-law, Tamusius Adjutor and Turronia Epictesis, dedicated a second-century tomb at Puteoli in Campania for her husband, Lucius Turronius Adjutor, aged thirty-six years, forty days.
- Lucius Betutius L. f. Furianus, the centurion primus pilus of the Legio I Italica, became one of the municipal duumvirs at Ariminum in Cisalpine Gaul, and a patron of the colony, as well as serving as curule aedile and flamen of the cult of Nerva during the reign of Trajan.
- Betitia C. [...], donated one hundred pounds of silver for the ornamentation of a structure at Aeclanum, some time between the beginning of the second century, and the early third.
- Betitia Elegans, the wife of Quintus Julius Castrensis, with whom she built a second- or third-century family sepulchre at Rome.
- Betutia T. l. Philete, a freedwoman named in an inscription from Patrae in Achaia, dating from the second or third century.
- Betitius Pius, the owner of slaves named Silva and Callimedons, buried in second- or third-century tombs at Venusia in Samnium. Silva's tomb was built by her fellow slave, Alphius, while Callimedons' was built by his son, Amarantus.
- Betitia Quintiliana, a young woman buried at Aeclanum, aged sixteen years, ten months, in a second- or third-century tomb built by her grieving father, Betitius Rufinus, for his daughter and her husband, Claudius Justinus.
- Betitius Rufinus, built a second- or third-century tomb at Aeclanum for his daughter, Betitia Quintiliana, and her husband, Claudius Justinus.
- Betitius Rufus, built a second- or third-century tomb at Aeclanum for Fannia Erculia, his wife of twenty-six years, two months.
- Betutia Sertoriana, named in an inscription from Cales in Campania, dating between AD 138 and 140.
- Betitia C. f. Justa, honored with an inscription by Epaphroditus Herma and other freedmen, by a decree of the Decurions at Aeclanum, dating from the Antonine dynasty.
- Gnaeus Betutius Proculus, a soldier from Luna in Etruria, serving in the second cohort of the Praetorian Guard at Rome in AD 143, under the centurion Caecilius.
- Gaius Neratius C. f. C. n. C. pron. C. abn. Proculus Betitius Pius Maximillianus, a man of consular rank, who held a number of other public offices and priesthoods during the mid-second century, recorded in a series of inscriptions from Aeclanum.
- Neratia Betitia Procilla, a flaminica named in an inscription from Aeclanum, dating between AD 147 and 161, mentioning Faustina the Younger.
- Betitia M[...], ordered a statue for Marcus Mindius be built from the proceeds of her will, according to an inscription from Aeclanum, dating from the latter half of the second century. Evidently related to the Betitia Secunda who was the wife of Marcus Mindius Hirpinus.
- Betitia C. l. Secunda, a freedwoman, buried at Frequentum in Samnium, in a family sepulchre built by her husband, Marcus Mindius Hirpinus, for Betitia, along with their son, also named Marcus Mindius Hirpinus, and the elder Hirpinus' mother, Julia Restituta.
- Betitia C. f. Maximilla, buried at Aeclanum, in a tomb built by her husband, Gaius Vibius Hilarius, for himself and his family, dating from the latter half of the second century.
- Betitius Callistus Isena, built a tomb at Beneventum, dating between the middle of the second and the middle of the third century, for his wife, Satria Vera.
- Gaius Betitius Derisor, built a tomb at Beneventum, dating between the middle of the second and the middle of the third century, for Peregrina, a slave or freedwoman.
- Gaius Betitius Honeratus, buried at Aeclanum, in a tomb built by Gaius Critonius Justus, dating between the middle of the second century and the end of the third.
- Gaius Betitius Sextio, together with Betitia Secundina, Betitius Sextio, Betitia Helene, and Betitius Firminus, probably his children, dedicated a tomb at Comum in Cisalpine Gaul, dating between the middle of the second century and the end of the third, for his wife, also named Betitia Helene.
- Betitia Helene, buried at Comum, in a tomb dating between the middle of the second century and the end of the third, built by her husband, Gaius Betitius Sextio, together with Betitius Secundina, Betitius Sextio, Betitia Helene, and Betitius Firminus, presumably her children.
- Betitia (C. f.) Secundina, presumably the daughter of Gaius Betitius Sextio and Betitia Helene. Together with her father and siblings, she built a second- or third-century tomb for her mother at Comum.
- (Gaius) Betitius (C. f.) Sextio, presumably the son of Gaius Betitius Sextio and Betitia Helene. Together with his father and siblings, he built a second- or third-century tomb for his mother at Comum.
- Betitia (C. f.) Helene, presumably the daughter of Gaius Betitius Sextio and Betitia Helene. Together with her father and siblings, she built a second- or third-century tomb for her mother at Comum.
- (Gaius) Betitius (C. f.) Firminus, presumably the son of Gaius Betitius Sextio and Betitia Helene. Together with his father and siblings, he built a second- or third-century tomb for his mother at Comum.
- Sentia Betutia, dedicated a tomb at Parma in Cisalpine Gaul, dating between AD 160 and 250, for Gaius Ae[...] Pau[...], her husband of fifteen years.
- Gaius Betitius Sabinus, along with his wife, Ninnia Elpis, dedicated a late second- or third-century tomb at Rome for their son, Ninnius Charito. The inscription is probably forged or modern.
- Gaius Betitius Maximillianus, consul suffectus in an uncertain year between AD 193 and 211.

==== Third century ====
- Gaius Betitius Pius, the master of a slave named Felicianus, mentioned in an early third-century inscription from Aequum Tuticum in Samninum.
- Betitia Pia, the mistress of a slave named Successus, named in a bronze inscription from Aeclanum, dating from the first half of the third century.
- Gaius Betitius Callianax, buried at Aeclanum, in a third-century tomb built by his wife, Hygia.
- Gaius Betitius C. f. Pius, probably consul suffectus in an uncertain year before AD 217, is mentioned among the patrons of the city of Canusium in AD 223. His wife is likely the Fuscinilla named along with him in a bronze inscription from Aeclanum dating between AD 221 and 230.
- Betitia Plotina, a girl from a senatorial family, named in an early or mid-third century inscription from Beneventum.

==== Fourth century ====
- Betitius Perpetuus, thought to be a descendant of Gaius Betitius Pius, was Corrector of Sicily around AD 312 to 314. He was probably the father of Betitius Perpetuus Arzygius.
- Betitia Pullentina, buried at Teanum Sidicinum in Campania, aged forty-six years, four months, and sixteen days, on the fourth day before the Nones of September (Note: September 2.) in an uncertain year between AD 341 and 400, in a Christian tomb built by her husband, Claudius Bassus.
- Betitia, buried in a Christian tomb at Rome, dating from the latter half of the fourth century, built by her husband, Theoctestus.
- Faltonia Betitia Proba, the wife of Clodius Celsinus Adelphius, praefectus urbi in AD 351, authored the Cento Vergilianus de Laudibus Christi, which still exists, as well as a poem about the war between Constantius II and Magnentius, which ended in 353. Their sons were Quintus Clodius Hermogenianus Olybrius, consul in 379, and Faltonius Probus Alypius, praefectus urbi in 391.
- Betitius Perpetuus Arzygius, a man of consular rank, mentioned in connection with Etruria and Umbria in AD 366.
- Betitius, buried in a Christian tomb at Aeclanum on a Wednesday in AD 376, or possibly 378.

=== Undated Betutii ===
- Betitius, buried in a family sepulchre at Rome.
- Gaius Betitius, probably the owner of Eutychus, according to an inscription from Lutetia in Gallia Lugdunensis.
- Lucius Betutius C. f., named in an inscription from the present site of Ceresara, formerly part of Venetia and Histria, along with Sextia Prima and Betutia Tertulla, apparently members of his family.
- Lucius Betutius L. f., buried at Placentia in Cisalpine Gaul, along with his sons, Lucius Betutius Rufus and Gaius Betutius Salvius, and his daughter-in-law, Cintullia Maxima, in a family sepulchre built by his grandson, Lucius Betutius Tenax.
- Marcus Betutius L. f., a potter whose maker's mark was found on ceramics from Velleia in Cisalpine Gaul.
- Statius Betutius, a potter whose maker's mark has been found on ceramics from Baeterrae in Gallia Narbonensis.
- Marcus Betutius Ametistus, named in a sepulchral inscription from Aquinum, along with the freedwoman Betutia Lexis.
- Gaius Betutius Bassinus, along with Quintus Betutius Gratinus, made an offering to Mercury at the site of modern Gilly-sur-Isère, formerly part of Gallia Narbonensis.
- Betutius Encolpus, buried at Rome, in a tomb built by his son, Betutius Fortunatianus.
- Sextus Betutius Euprepes, dedicated a sepulchre at Ucetia in Gallia Narbonensis for the freedwoman Betutia Olympina and himself.
- Betutius Fortunatianus, built a tomb at Rome for his father, Betutius Encolpus.
- Publius Betutius Fortunatus, buried at Rome, in a sepulchre built by his wife, Betutia Urania, for herself and her family.
- Quintus Betutius Gratinus, along with Gaius Betutius Bassinus, made an offering to Mercury at the site of modern Gilly-sur-Isère.
- Gaius Betutius Hermes, one of the seviri Augustales at Vicus Augusti in Gallia Narbonensis, had a plaque dedicated to Mars out of the proceeds of his will.
- Betutius Ingenuus, dedicated a sepulchre at Rome for his wife, Seia Serena, and their family.
- Betutia Ɔ. l. Lexis, a freedwoman buried at Aquinum, aged six, with an inscription also naming Marcus Betutius Ametistus.
- Betutia Nereis, dedicated a tomb at Rome for her husband, Gellius Onesimus, and their family.
- Betutia Olympina, a freedwoman buried at Ucetia, in a sepulchre built by Sextus Betutius Euprepes for himself and Olympina.
- Betutius Phyr, named in an inscription from Rome.
- Gaius Betitius Pius, named on a bronze label from an uncertain province.
- Betutia Polla, dedicated a tomb at Nemausus in Gallia Narbonensis for her husband, Sextus Betutius Trypho, and herself.
- Betutia Prima, built a tomb at Nemausus for herself and her friend, Publius Popilius Victor.
- Betutia L. f. Procula, a young woman buried at Ravenna in Cisalpine Gaul, aged sixteen years and thirty days, in a tomb built by her parents, Lucius Betutius Proculus and Caesia Victrix.
- Lucius Betutius Proculus, along with his wife, Caesia Victrix, dedicated a tomb at Ravenna for their daughter, Betutia Procula.
- Lucius Betutius L. f. L. n. Rufus, buried at Placentia, along with his wife, Cintullia Maxima, father, Lucius Betutius, and brother, Gaius Betutius Salvius, in a family sepulchre built by his son, Lucius Betutius Tenax.
- Gaius Betutius L. f. L. n. Salvius, buried at Placentia, along with his father, Lucius Betutius, brother, Lucius Betutius Rufus, and sister-in-law, Cintullia Maxima, in a family sepulchre built by his nephew, Lucius Betutius Tenax.
- Betutius C. f. Satto, a veteran of the Legio VII Gemina, buried at Tarraco in Hispania Citerior, in a tomb built by his friend, Marcus Julius Fidelis.
- Betutia Secunda, named in an inscription from Narbo, along with persons named Lamponius and Primigenius.
- Lucius Betutius L. f. L. n. Tenax, built a family sepulchre at Placentia for his parents, Lucius Betutius Rufus and Cintullia Maxima, grandfather, also named Lucius Betutius, and uncle, Gaius Betutius Salvius.
- Betutia L. f. Tertulla, named in an inscription from the site of modern Ceresara, along with Lucius Betutius and Sextia Prima, apparently members of the same family.
- Betitia Thisbe, dedicated a tomb at Ausculum in Apulia for a young freedman named Albano, aged seventeen.
- Sextus Betutius Trypho, buried at Nemausus in Gallia Narbonensis, in a tomb built by his wife, Betutia Polla, for herself and her husband.
- Betutia Urania, dedicated a sepulchre at Rome for her husband, Publius Betutius Fortunatus, and their family.

== See also ==
- List of Roman gentes

== Bibliography ==
- Marcus Tullius Cicero, Brutus.
- Dictionary of Greek and Roman Biography and Mythology, William Smith, ed., Little, Brown and Company, Boston (1849).
- René Cagnat et alii, L'Année épigraphique (The Year in Epigraphy, abbreviated AE), Presses Universitaires de France (1888–present).
- August Pauly, Georg Wissowa, et alii, Realencyclopädie der Classischen Altertumswissenschaft (Scientific Encyclopedia of the Knowledge of Classical Antiquities, abbreviated RE or PW), J. B. Metzler, Stuttgart (1894–1980).
- Rivista di Archeologia Cristiana (Journal of Christian Archaeology), Pontificia Commissio de Sacra Archaeologia, Rome (1924–present).
- La Carte Archéologique de la Gaule (Archaeological Map of Gaul, abbreviated CAG), Académie des Inscriptions et Belles-Lettres (1931–present).
- Paul-Marie Duval, Les inscriptions antiques de Paris, Imprimerie Nationale, Paris (1960).
- Paul M. M. Leunissen, Konsuln und Konsulare in der Zeit von Commodus bis Severus Alexander (Consuls and Consulars from the Time of Commodus to Severus Alexander), Verlag Gieben, Amsterdam, (1989).
- Giovanni Battista Brusin, Inscriptiones Aquileiae (Inscriptions of Aquileia), Udine (1991–1993).
- Athanasios D. Rizakis, Achaie II. La cité de Patras: Épigraphie et histoire, Centre de Recherche de l'Antiquité grecque et romaine, Athens (1998).
- Arno Hüttemann, Pompejanische Inschriften, Reclams Universal-Bibliothek, Stuttgart (2010).
