= Modestus =

Modestus is a Roman cognomen and a masculine name. It may refer to:

== Ancient Romans ==
- Julius Modestus (1st century BC), Roman freedman and grammarian
- Marcus Mettius Modestus (procurator) (1st century AD), Roman governor of Egypt
- Aufidius Modestus (1st century AD), Roman philologist, commentator on Horace
- Mettius Modestus, Roman consul AD 82
- Gaius Trebonius Proculus Mettius Modestus (2nd century), Roman senator
- Modestus (apologete) (2nd century), Christian apologist who wrote against Marcion
- Quintus Aiacius Modestus Crescentianus, consul alongside Marcus Pomponius Maecius Probus in 228
- Domitius Modestus (fl. 358–377), Roman politician
- Gaius Sollius Modestus Sidonius Apollinaris (5th century), Roman poet and diplomat
- Modestus or Pseudo-Modestus (9th century?), supposed author of the Libellus de vocabulis rei militaris

== Saints ==
- Saint Modestus (it), legendary saint and educator of Saint Vitus, martyr under Diocletian (c. 304)
- Modestus, martyr at Agde alongside Saint Tiberius during the Diocletianic persecution
- Modestus (bishop of Trier) (died 489), saint
- Modestus of Jerusalem (died 630), Christian patriarch of Jerusalem
- Modestus of Carantania (c. 720–before 772), Irish missionary to the Carantanians and saint

== Modern world ==
- Modestus Yao Z. Ahiable (born 1948), Ghanaian politician
- Modestus Atshipara (born 1966), Namibian politician
- Modestus Kilufi (born 1959), Tanzanian politician
- Modestus Setiawan (born 1982), Indonesian footballer

== See also ==
- Modestinus (died 311), Christian martyr and saint
- Saint Modesta, female saint
