= Modest =

Modest is an adjective describing the quality of Modesty and may refer to:

- A number of saints; see Saint Modest (disambiguation)
- Michael Modest (born 1971), semi-retired American professional wrestler
- Modest (email client), a free, open source, e-mail client
- Modest (play), a 2023 play by Ellen Brammar

People with the given name Modest or Modesty:

- Modest Altschuler (1873–1963), cellist, orchestral conductor, and composer
- Modest Isopescu (1895–1948), soldier, administrator and convicted war criminal
- Modest Morariu (1929–1988), poet, essayist, prose writer and translator
- Modest Mussorgsky (1839–1881), Russian composer
- Modest Romiszewski (1861–1930), military theorist
- Modest Schoepen (Bobbejaan Schoepen) (1925–2010), Belgian singer-songwriter, entertainer and founder of the Bobbejaanland amusement park
- Modest Ilyich Tchaikovsky (1850–1916), Russian dramatist, opera librettist and translator
- Modest Urgell (1839–1919), Spanish painter, illustrator, and playwright
- Modesty Napunyi (1957–2002), boxer

In fiction:

- Modesty Blaise, character of the eponymous comic strip

== See also ==
- Modesty Blaise (disambiguation) 1963 comic strip and its adaptations
- Humility
- Modeste (disambiguation)
- Modest Mouse
- Modesty Handicap (horse race)
- Modesty (Corradini sculpture), 1752 sculpture by Antonio Corradini
