= Modeste =

Modeste may refer to:

- Modeste (name), including a list of people with the name
- French ship Modeste (1759), a 64-gun ship of the line of the French Navy
- French ship Modeste, list of French ships with this name
- HMS Modeste, list of British ships with this name
- Modeste (comic character), a Belgian comic character

== See also ==
- Modest (disambiguation)
- Modesty
- St. Modeste
