= Mettia gens =

Ancient Roman family

The gens Mettia, also written Metia, was a plebeian family at ancient Rome. Few members of this gens occur in history, and none attained the higher offices of the Roman state under the Republic. Several Mettii rose to prominence in imperial times, with at least three obtaining the consulship in the late first and early second century.

== Origin ==
The Dictionary of Greek and Roman Biography and Mythology describes Mettius as "an old Italian name, in use both among the Sabines and Latins. It is doubtful whether Mettius or Metius is the better orthography, as we sometimes find one and sometimes the other in the best [manuscripts]." There is no reason to doubt that the nomen Mettius is a patronymic surname, based on the old praenomen Mettius, and perhaps sharing a common origin with the nomen of the Metilia gens.

== Members ==
This list includes abbreviated praenomina. For an explanation of this practice, see filiation.

- Publius Mettius, assassinated Gaius Memmius, one of the candidates in the consular elections, on behalf of his allies, Saturninus and Glaucia, in 100 BC.
- Marcus Mettius, Caesar's legate to the German king Ariovistus in 58 BC, at the beginning of the Gallic War. He was taken prisoner by Ariovistus, but subsequently rescued. A coin depicting the head of Caesar, and inscribed "M. Mettius", probably refers to this event.
- Marcus Mettius Modestus, supposed to have been governor of Egypt at some point prior to the reign of Nero, was the former master of Marcus Mettius Epaphroditus, a Greek grammarian, who had tutored Modestus' son.
- Marcus Mettius M. l. Epaphroditus, a Greek grammarian during the latter half of the first century. He had been a pupil of Archias of Alexandria, and after obtaining his freedom lived at Rome, from the reign of Nero to that of Nerva. He amassed a library of more than thirty thousand volumes, and wrote a number of works concerning grammar, as well as commentaries on Greek literature.
- Mettius Pomposianus, a senator elevated to the consulate by the emperor Vespasian, notwithstanding the rumor that he was prophesied to become emperor himself one day. Domitian, less tolerant of potential rivals, banished him to Corsica, and subsequently had him put to death.
- Mettius Modestus, consul suffectus in AD 82.
- Marcus Mettius Rufus, brother of the consul suffectus in 82, and father of the consul suffectus in 103. Rufus was governor of Egypt from 100 to 103.
- Mettius Carus, a notorious informer during the reign of Domitian.
- Gaius Trebonius Proculus Mettius Modestus, consul suffectus in AD 103.
- Marcus Junius Mettius M. f. Rufus, consul suffectus in AD 128.

== See also ==
- List of Roman gentes

== Bibliography ==
- Gaius Julius Caesar, Commentarii de Bello Gallico (Commentaries on the Gallic War).
- Marcus Valerius Martialis (Martial), Epigrammata (Epigrams).
- Gaius Plinius Caecilius Secundus (Pliny the Younger), Epistulae (Letters).
- Decimus Junius Juvenalis, Satirae (Satires).
- Publius Cornelius Tacitus, De Vita et Moribus Iulii Agricolae (On the Life and Mores of Julius Agricola).
- Gaius Suetonius Tranquillus, De Vita Caesarum (Lives of the Caesars, or The Twelve Caesars).
- Lucius Cassius Dio Cocceianus (Cassius Dio), Roman History.
- Sextus Aurelius Victor (attributed), Epitome de Caesaribus.
- Paulus Orosius, Historiarum Adversum Paganos (History Against the Pagans).
- Suda.
- Dictionary of Greek and Roman Biography and Mythology, William Smith, ed., Little, Brown and Company, Boston (1849).
- George Davis Chase, "The Origin of Roman Praenomina", in Harvard Studies in Classical Philology, vol. VIII (1897).
- Paul von Rohden, Elimar Klebs, & Hermann Dessau, Prosopographia Imperii Romani (The Prosopography of the Roman Empire, abbreviated PIR), Berlin (1898).
