= Aquae Flaviae =

Human settlement in Portugal

- Aquæ Flaviæ
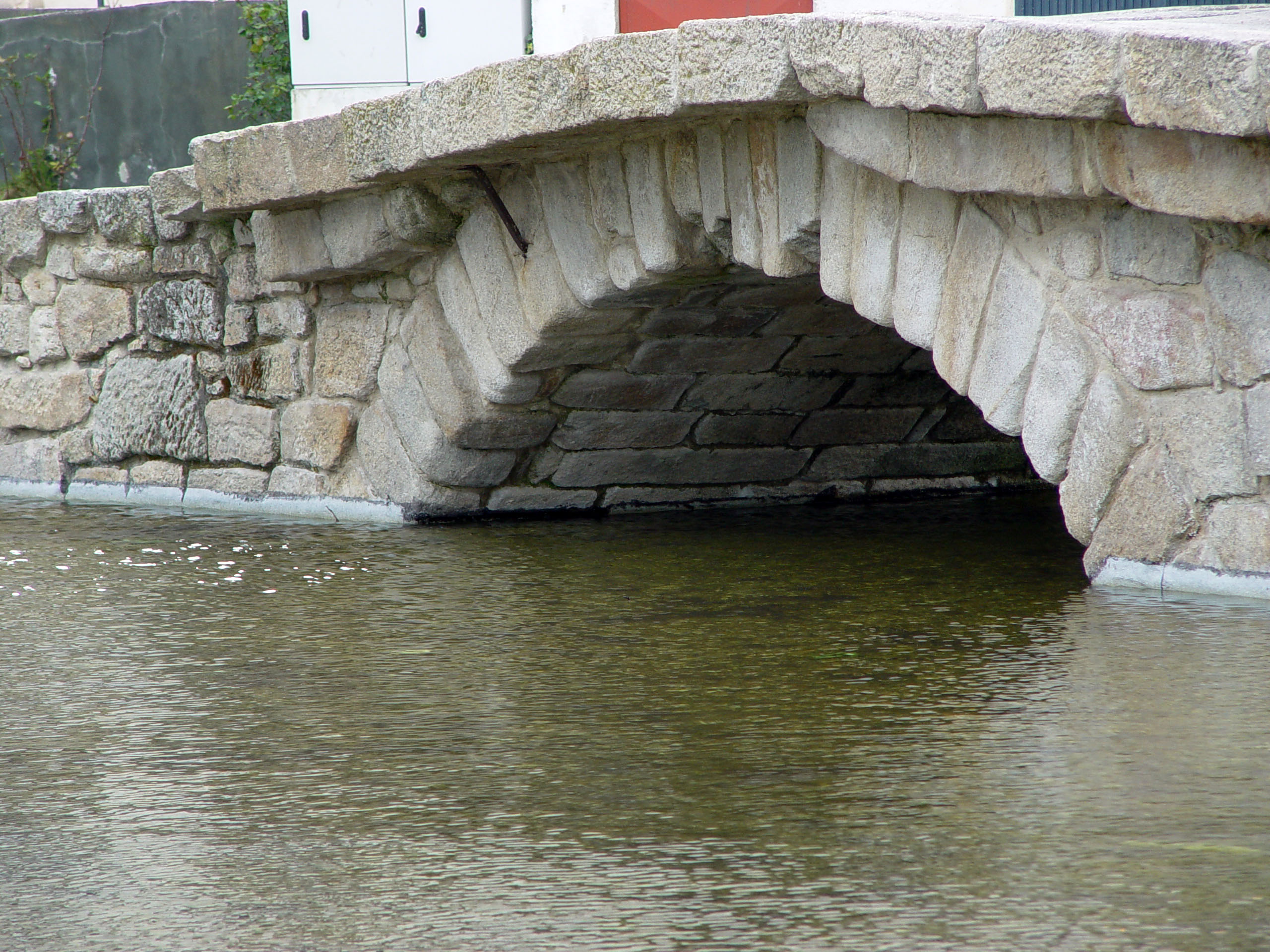
- The landscaped springs of the ancient Roman thermals

- Location within Portugal
- 41.739°N 7.469°W
- Type: Settlement
- Cultures: Roman
- Location: Chaves
- Region: Trás-os-Montes

Aquae Flaviae (or Aquæ Flaviæ) is the ancient Roman city and former bishopric (now a Latin Catholic titular see) of Chaves, a municipality in the Portuguese district of Vila Real.

== History ==
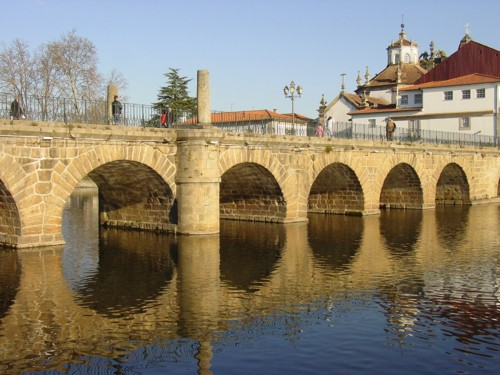
The Roman bridge of Chaves constructed during the era of Vespasian and Trajan

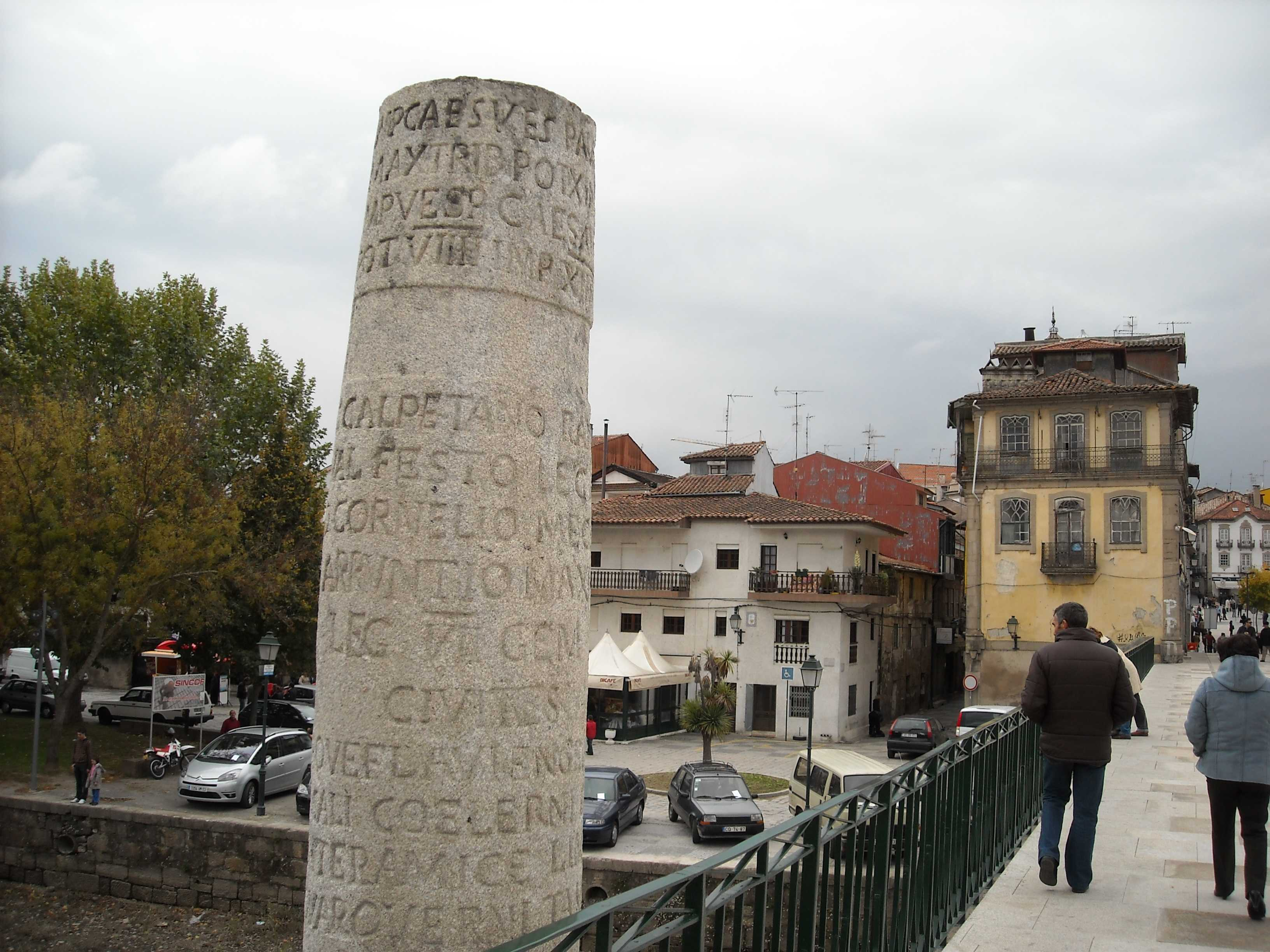
The commemorative columns that mark the bridge and Roman settlement in Aquae Flaviae

The northwest peninsular region is an area of hot springs and Roman settlements linked to the exploitation of valuable natural resources.

Aquae Flaviae was the principal municipium civitas in the northwest (from epigraphic findings) implanted in the Trás-os-Montes, on a small hill on the banks of the River Tâmega, in the Roman province of Gallaecia. This was a fertile area, where hot springs abound, in addition to a mining region from which gold is extracted. It is also located in a strategic place between the Roman cities of Bracara and Asturica, as well as the mining districts of Três Minas and Jales, located southwest of the civitates.

Little is known of the urban fabric although there are some important points: an aqueduct supplied water from a reservoir and dam in Abobeleira, there was a theatre/amphitheatre, vestiges of a necropolis and sections of a wall.

With respect to the thermal activity, the lack of archaeological excavations means that little is known as of the alleged ancient Roman baths. Modern excavations have begun to uncover the remains of another Roman baths structure associated with a hot spring in Largo do Arrabalde consisting of large pavement slabs and a block of opus caementicium associated with a thermal spring. These are the first known thermal remains known to be located within Chaves. Further, within the civitates there are many complicated votive epigraphs which seem to relate to thermal worship. There are two inscriptions dedicated to nymphs, a lost inscription dedicated to Tutela and another to Isis, that suggest a thermal cult.

Architecturally, the most notable feature of this city, is the bridge of Trajan over the Tâmega River, whose existence marked a period of exceptional development of the city. Functioning as a crossroads, it controlled the routes to the mining districts. The remains of two epigraphic inscriptions are located on the bridge, commemorating the construction or remodelling by Emperor Trajan, as well as another that aroused various interpretations, the Padrão dos Povos. The Padrão dos Povos mentions the civitates dependant of Aquae Flaviae: Aquiflavienses, Avobrigenses, Bibali, Coelerni, Equaesi, Interamici, Limici, Naebisoci, Querquerni and Tamagani, as well as the Roman Legio VII Gemina Felix legion.

Aquae Flaviae was founded by Rome, although the details of that founding remain obscure. Ptolemy suggests that it was founded in Turodi territory, a theory that has been strengthened by the existence of epigraphic evidence documenting the presence of Turodi.

== Diocese of Aquae Flaviae ==
Aquae Flaviae became a bishopric in the fourth century which lasted until the Arabic conquest in the eight century. It was restored as a titular see in 1969.
