= Flavius Romulus =

Roman politician and army officer

Flavius Romulus (died 28 September 351 AD) was a Roman politician, appointed to the high position of consul in 343. The historian Benet Salway tentatively identified him with Romulus, the senior army officer who fought and died for the usurper Magnentius at the Battle of Mursa in 351.

Salway suggested Romulus was a leading member of the military establishment of Emperor Constans (r. 337–350), and thus his (and not his brother's) appointee for the consulate. Romulus would then have been among the high military officials who overthrew Constans and proclaimed Magnentius as emperor in January 350. He commanded Magnentius's forces (apparently with the rank of magister equitum, 'master of cavalry') in the Battle of Mursa against Constantius, the brother and co-emperor of Constans. Zosimus related that Romulus was wounded by a dart, but fought on and did not die until he killed the enemy who threw it.

The editors of the Prosopography of the Later Roman Empire suggest Flavius Pisidius Romulus, urban prefect of Rome in the early 5th century, was his descendant.

Political offices
Preceded by Constantius Augustus; Constans Augustus	Roman consul 343 with Marcus Furius Placidus	Succeeded by Domitius Leontius; Flavius Bonosus
