= Marcus Maecius Memmius Furius Baburius Caecilianus Placidus =

Roman politician

Marcus Maecius Memmius Furius Baburius Caecilianus Placidus was a Roman statesman who served as Consul in 343 AD and as Praefectus urbi from 346 to 347 AD.

== See also ==
- Maecia gens

== Bibliography ==
- Potter, David Stone, The Roman Empire at Bay: Ad 180-395, Routledge, 2004, ISBN 0415100577, p. 476.
- Corpus Inscriptionum Latinarum 10.1700; item "EDCS-11500639" in "Epigraphik-Datenbank Clauss/Slaby". "M(arco) Maecio Memmio Furio Baburio / Caeciliano Placido c(larissimo) v(iro) / pontifici maiori auguri pu/blico p(opuli) R(omani) Quiritium quindecem/viro sacris faciundis correc/tori Venetiarum et Histriae / praefecto annonae urbis / sacrae cum iure gladii comiti / ordinis primi comiti orientis / Aegypti et Mesopotamiae iudi/ci sacrarum cognitionum / tertio iudici iterum ex de/legationibus sacris prae/fecto praetorio et iudici / sacrarum cognitionum / tertio consuli ordinario / patrono pr(a)estantissimo / regio Palatina / posuit" (image)

Political offices
| Preceded by Constantius II and Constans | Consul of the Roman Empire; 343; With: Flavius Romulus | Succeeded by Domitius Leontius, Bonosus, and Sallustius |
| Preceded by Petronius Probinus | Praefectus urbi 346-347 | Succeeded by Ulpius Limenius |
