= Gaius Junius Flavianus =

Roman eques in the 2nd century AD

Gaius Junius Flavianus was a Roman eques who held a number of appointments in the second century AD. He is known from a series of inscriptions.

His public career is known from dedication by the mercatores frumentari and oleari Afrari to him, which was recovered from Rome and is currently in the Museo Nazionale Romano. After being commissioned military tribune with Legio VII Gemina, which was stationed in Spain at the time, Junius Julianus advanced in a regular fashion through the levels of a civil career. First is promagister vicesima hereditatium, or sub-director of the twentieth inheritance tax; next is procurator or governor of Alpes Maritimes; this is followed by procurator of Hispaniae citerioris per Asturicam et Callaeciam, or overseer of the centenary of Spanish cities in Asturia and Galicia; he returns to Rome as procurator of inheritances; then Flavianus is procurator of Lugdunensis and Aquitaine. Finally he reaches the apex of his financial career as a rationibus.

Henriette Pavis d'Escurac notes there is little in this inscription, nor its copy erected in his honor at Lyon, to provide any firm dates. She notes that "regularity" of his career led Hans-Georg Pflaum to date Flavianus "to an era of peace and tranquility which can probably be found at the end of Hadrian's reign and under that of Antoninus Pius". She also notes Arthur Stein dated Flavianus' career to the beginning of the reign of that emperor, while W. Hüttl, in his prosopography of that period, neglected to mention Junius Flavianus at all.
