= Coelerni =

Ancient Celtic tribe

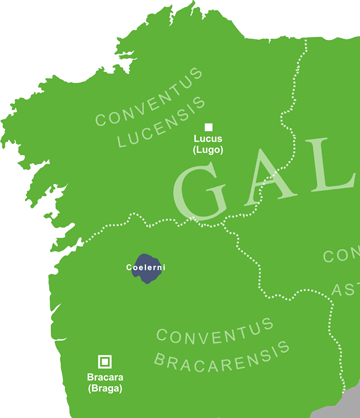
Map of Gallaecia

The Coelerni were an ancient Celtic tribe of Gallaecia in Hispania (the Iberian Peninsula), part of Calaician or Gallaeci people, living in what was to become the Roman Province of Hispania Tarraconensis, in what is now the southern part of the province of Ourense (in Galicia).

Some sources, like Alarcão, also state that the Coelerni lived in the north of modern Portugal, in the province of Trás-os-Montes, in the mountains between the rivers Tua and Sabor - this seems to be incorrect and predates the finding of the Tessera Hospitalis of Castromao. However there was a lusitanian people of the Colarni (inscription of Alcantara) living near the Douro river in Lamego, that could have some link with the galician Coelerni.

== Classical Sources ==
The Coelerni are known from few literary sources, such as Pliny and Ptolemy, and because they appear as one of the ten civitates of the convent Bracarensis that are cited in the Inscription of the Peoples of Chaves (the Roman Aquae Flaviae), a column in the Roman bridge in Chaves where those people rend homage to Emperor Vespasian.

Pliny, knew the Iberian Peninsula, as he had worked there as an administrator during the reign of Vespasian. The results of a census he passes on to us informs about the following: «The jurisdiction of Lucus contains 15 peoples both unimportant and bearing outlandish names, excepting the Celtici and the Lemavi, but with a free population amounting to about 166,000. In a similar way the 24 states [civitates] of Braga contain 285,000 persons, of whom besides the Bracari themselves may be mentioned, without wearying the reader, the Biballi, Coelerni, Callaeci, Equaesi, Limici and Querquerni (Naturalis Historia, III, 3, 28).

== Main city ==
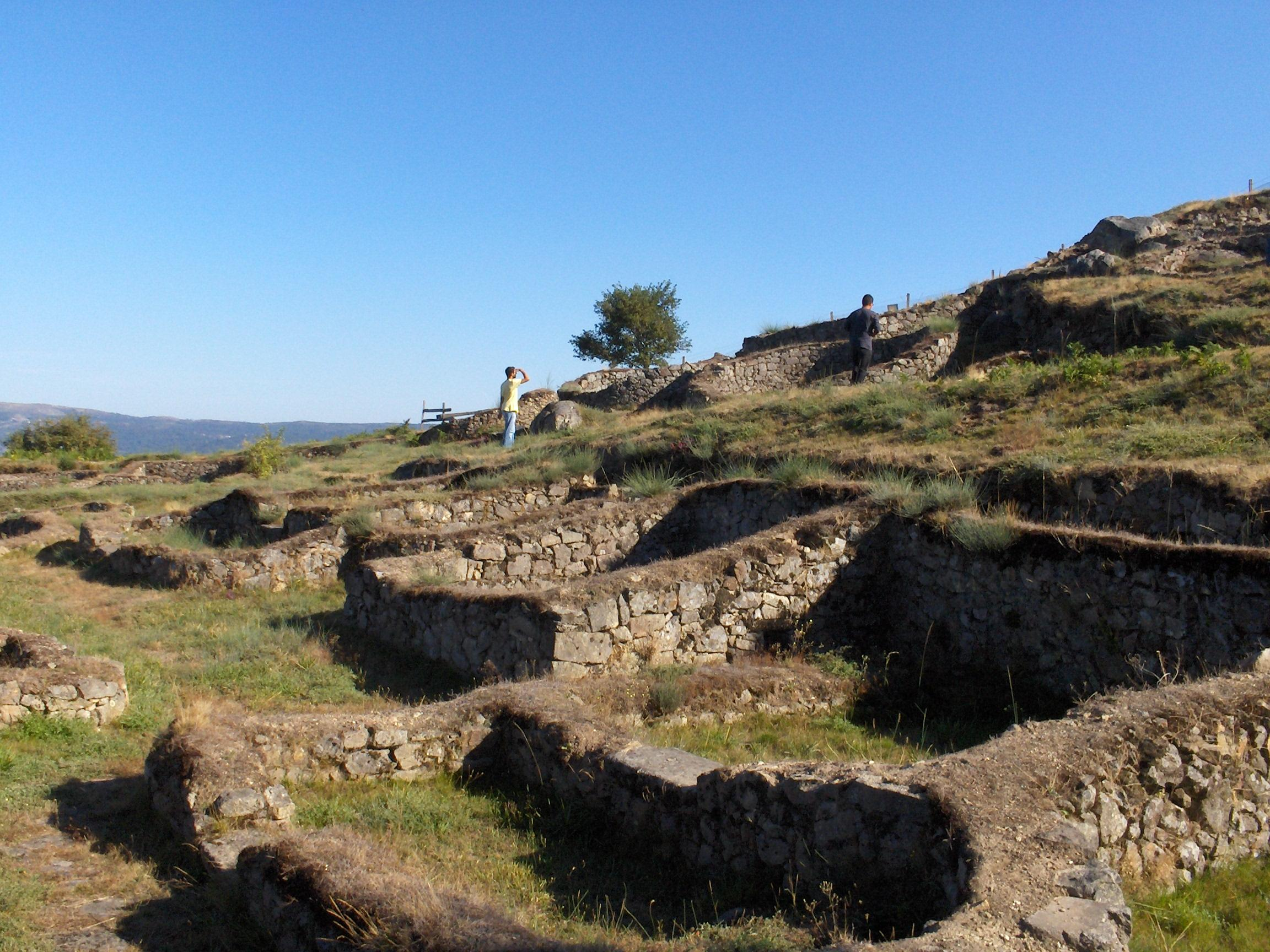
Castro de Castromao, Castro-capital of the Coelerni

The main city of the Coelerni was Coeliobriga, now Castromao in Celanova (Ourense, Galicia, Spain). This Castro was inhabited from the 6th century BC until the beginning of the 4th century CE.

== Treaty with Rome ==
A Treaty of Friendship between the Coelerni and the Romans was made in 132. A Tessera Hospitalis was found stating a pact of hospitality between the tribe of the Coelerni, thus accepting their peaceful integration in Hispania Citerior, and the Roman military commander of the Legion VII Gemina Civitas Limicorum, Gneo Antonius Aquilus Novaugustanus, in exchange for their defence under Emperor Hadrian.

The exact text of the Tessera Hospitalis states: G(neo) IVLIO. SERVIO. AUGURINO. G(eneo) TREBIO. SERGIANO. CO(n)S(ulibus). COELERNI. EX-HISPANIA. CITERIORE. CONVENTUS. BRACARI. CVM. G ( neo). AN TONIO. AQUILO. NOVAUGUSTANO. PRAEF(ecto). COH(ortis). I. CELTIBERORUM. LIBERIS. POSTERISQUE. EIVS. HOS PITIUM. FECERUNT. G(neus). ANTONIVS. AQVILVS. CUM. COELER NIS. LIBERIS. POSTERISQUE. EORUM. HOSPITIUM. FECIT. LEGATUS. EGIT P(ublius). CAMPANIVS. GEMINVS.

Which can be translated as: Being Consuls Gneo Julio Augurino and Gneo Trebio Sergiano, the Coelerni of Hispania Citerior and of the convent Bracari, made a pact of hospitality with Gneo Antonio Aquilino Novaugustano, prefect of the first Cohort of the Celtiberians, with his sons and descendants. Gneo Antonio Aquilo made a pact of hospitality with the Coelerni, their sons and descendants. Acted as legate Publius Campanius Geminus.

== See also ==
- Pre-Roman peoples of the Iberian Peninsula
