= Casperius Aelianus =

Ancient Roman official (fl. AD 69 – 98)

- Years active: AD 69 – 98

Praetorian prefect
- In office After AD 81 – 94
- Monarch: Domitian
- In office AD 96 – 98
- Monarchs: Nerva, Trajan
- Military career
- Allegiance: Roman Empire
- Commands: Praetorian Guard
- Campaigns: Roman–Parthian War of 58–63 (possibly); Year of the Four Emperors

Casperius Aelianus (fl. AD 69 – 98) was an ancient Roman official who served as praetorian prefect under the emperors Domitian and Nerva, and briefly under Nerva's successor Trajan. He is believed to have served as a tribune (a junior military officer) under the general Vespasian, and to have fought on Vespasian's side during the civil war of AD 69, later known as the Year of the Four Emperors. Vespasian's victory in that war led to his elevation as emperor, and his younger son, Domitian, appointed Casperius as praetorian prefect in the later part of his own reign (AD 81 – 96). Following Domitian's assassination in September of AD 96, Casperius – whom Domitian had removed from his post at some point earlier – was reappointed by the new emperor, Nerva.

In the autumn of AD 97, Casperius led a revolt of the Praetorian Guard, with the aim of forcing Nerva to hand over for punishment those responsible for Domitian's assassination. Historians suggest that he may have been acting on his own initiative, or on the inducement of another, perhaps the governor Cornelius Nigerinus or Trajan, then a prominent general. Shortly after the revolt, Nerva appointed Trajan, who was popular with the soldiers, as his successor. After Nerva's death early in AD 98, Trajan summoned Casperius to his camp: the Roman historian Cassius Dio states that he "put [Casperius] out of the way", along with others who had been involved in the revolt of 97, though the precise meaning of this statement is unclear.

== Biography ==
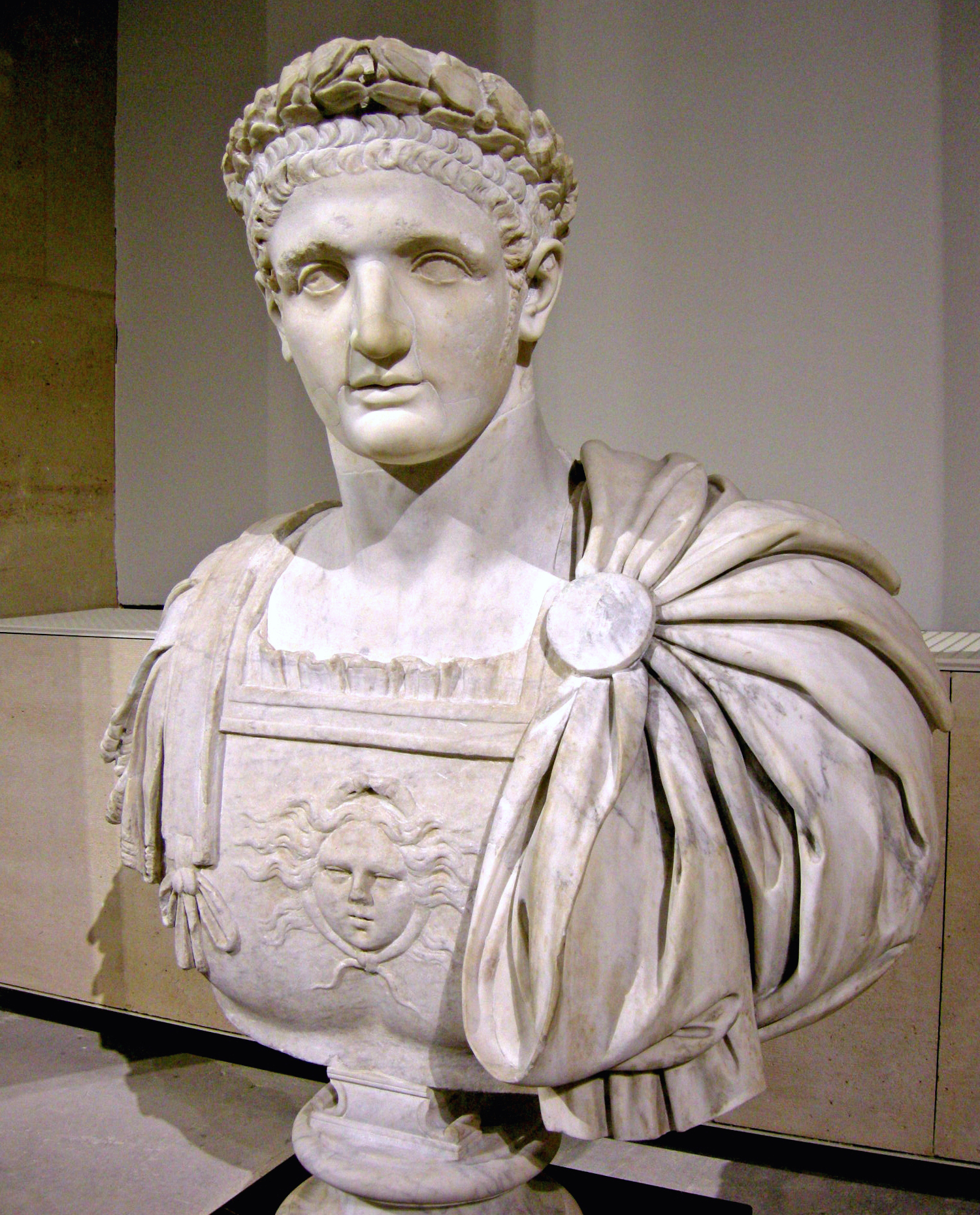
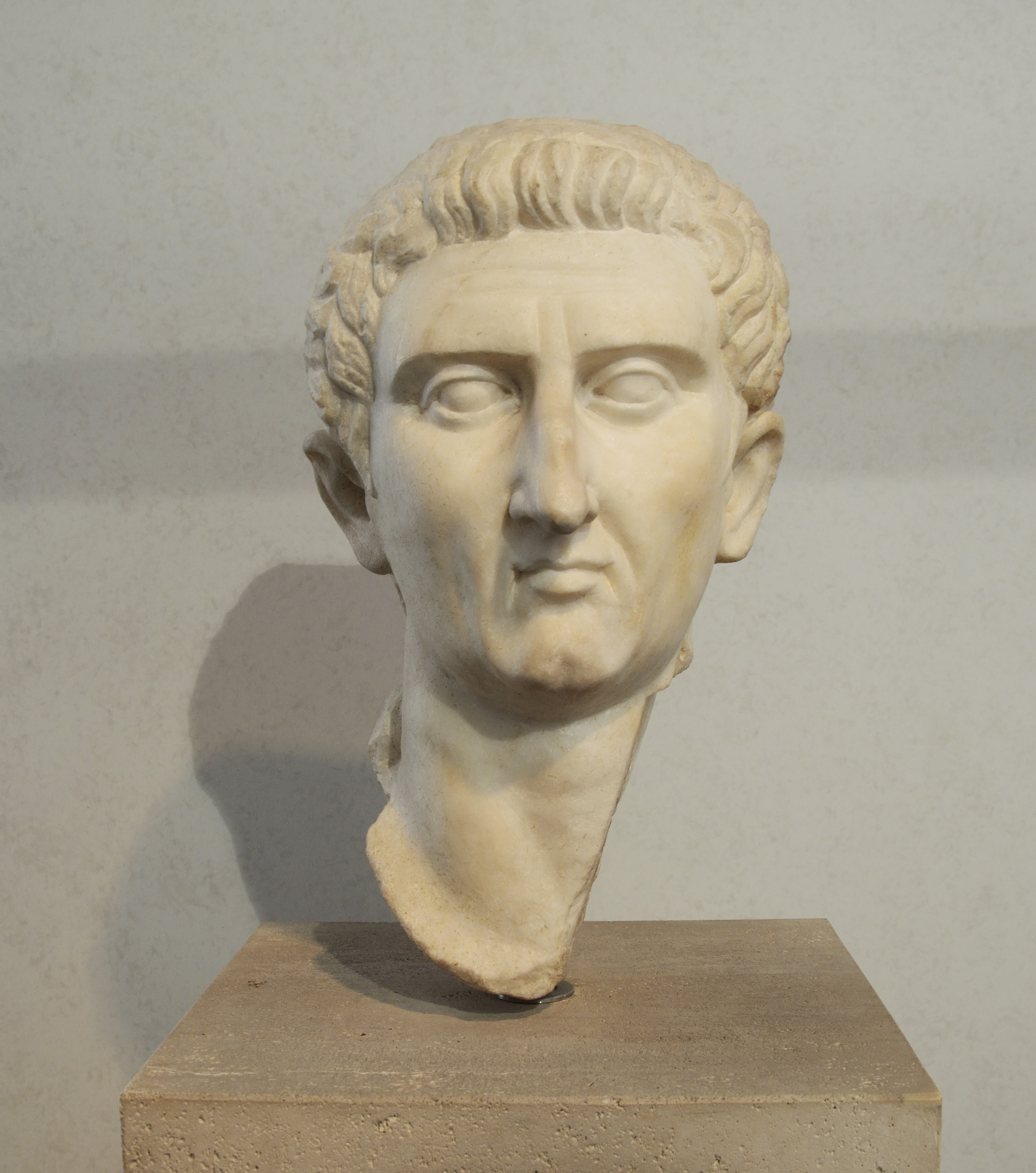
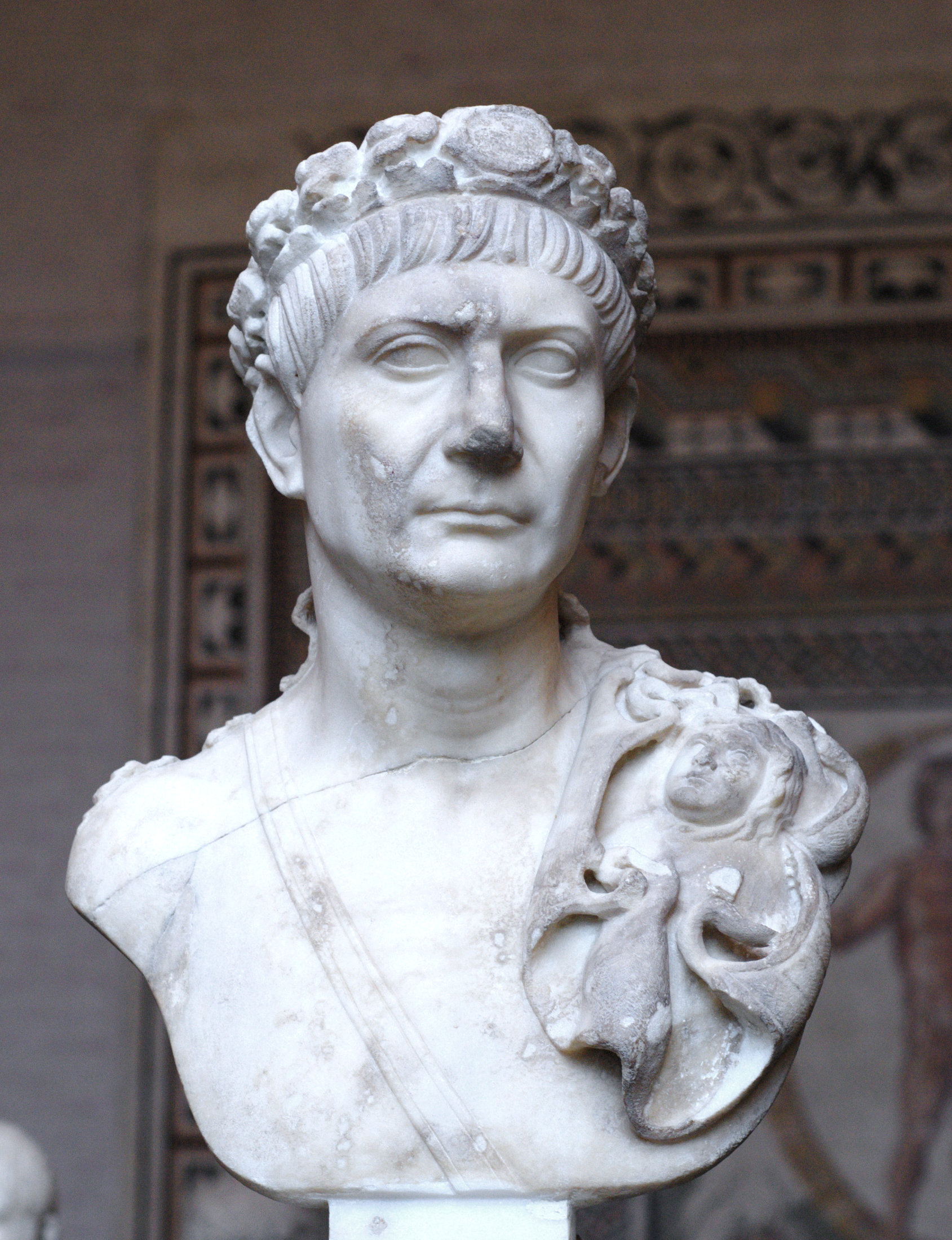
The three emperors under whom Casperius served as praetorian prefect: Domitian (r. AD 81 – 96), Nerva (r. 96–98), and Trajan (r. 98–117)

Nothing is known for sure of Casperius's origin or family. Parts of his career are attested in two ancient sources: the Life of Apollonius, (Note: The historian Brian W. Jones writes that "while it is probably unwise to dismiss Philostratus's account entirely, it must still be treated with extreme scepticism.") written by Philostratus in the third century AD, and Cassius Dio's history of Rome, written in the early part of that century. The historian Ronald Syme conjectures, on the basis of inscriptional evidence, that he may have originated at Amisus in the Roman province of Pontus in Asia Minor. According to the Life of Apollonius, he served as a tribune (a junior military officer) under the general Vespasian in Judaea, (Note: Syme 1958, p. 35, n. 4, citing Philostratus, Life of Apollonius 7.18.) and served with Vespasian during the civil war of AD 69, later known as the Year of the Four Emperors, which ended with Vespasian's elevation as emperor. The Roman historian Tacitus prominently mentions a centurion (a senior soldier, below officer rank) by the name of Casperius, who served in the eastern provinces with Gnaeus Domitius Corbulo during the Roman–Parthian War of 58–63: the modern historian Jonathan Eaton suggests that this might have been Casperius Aelianus. (Note: Syme 1958, p. 35, n. 4; Eaton 2014, p. 236; Tacitus, Annals 15.5.2.)

Casperius was appointed as praetorian prefect in the later part of the reign of Vespasian's younger son, Domitian (r. AD 81 – 96), as the colleague of Lucius Laberius Maximus. Under earlier emperors of the Flavian dynasty, praetorian prefects had generally come from the imperial family itself; Casperius, along with the other prefects appointed by Domitian, did not. The historian Brian Jones suggests that the loyalty he demonstrated to Vespasian in AD 69 was the reason for his promotion under Domitian. According to the Life of Apollonius, he was a friend of Apollonius of Tyana and other philosophers, and tasked with presiding over a special court convened to try the former early in AD 93. (Note: The Life of Apollonius states, in the historian Maria Dzielska's summary, that Apollonius was accused of "[having] odd habits, such as his strange way of dressing, of [claiming] to be a god, of ... conjuring tricks performed in Ephesus, and of ... support given to the anti-State activities of Nerva and his companions by means of magic.")

Domitian was assassinated by a conspiracy of palace officials on 18 September, AD 96. By this point, (Note: The historian Albino Garzetti suggests that the demotion may have occurred in 94. Jones suggests that it may have followed the executions of several philosophers late in 93, speculating that Casperius may have taken an interest in those philosophers, and therefore been misidentified as one of their supporters, as a result of Domitian's cultivation of them in his early reign.) Casperius was no longer in post as praetorian prefect: the two positions were held by Norbanus and Titus Petronius Secundus. These may have been involved in the plot to assassinate Domitian, and indeed modern historians often assume that their support would have contributed significantly to its success. (Note: Brian Jones argues that the ancient sources available do not allow us to definitely determine that they were involved.) Domitian was succeeded by Nerva, who was declared emperor by the Senate on the day of the assassination. In the months that followed, Nerva re-appointed Casperius as praetorian prefect, replacing Norbanus. He may have intended this gesture to placate the Praetorian Guard, the imperial bodyguard corps who were powerful in Roman politics and often involved in deposing and appointing emperors. By early 97, Casperius was the only praetorian prefect in service.

In the autumn of AD 97, the Praetorian Guard rebelled, insisting that Nerva hand over those responsible for Domitian's assassination. The relevant passage of the Epitome de Caesaribus, a fifth-century summary of a longer work by the fourth-century historian Aurelius Victor, is uncertain: it may have stated that Casperius was bribed to carry out the insurrection, or alternatively that he had himself bribed the praetorians. (Note: If the former, the historian Karl-Heinz Schwarte has suggested Cornelius Nigrinus as the plot's ultimate origin.) Nerva initially refused to hand them over; on Casperius's orders, the praetorians killed Petronius Secundus and Parthenius, who had been Domitian's chamberlain. (Note: Schwarte 1979, p. 144. On Parthenius, see Gunderson 2021, p. 169.) Casperius subsequently forced Nerva to retroactively declare that the insurrection had been legal; within two or three months, Nerva adopted Trajan, a general popular with the soldiers, as his successor. This is interpreted as a gesture intended to reinforce Nerva's popularity with the soldiers and to give his rule legitimacy with them; it may also have been explicitly demanded by the revolters. The historians Andrew Berriman and Malcolm Todd suggest that Casperius may have acted at the instigation of Trajan himself.

Shortly thereafter, in January AD 98, Nerva died of natural causes. Trajan accepted the empire, and stayed north of the Alps for several months. The new emperor's accession made Casperius the first praetorian prefect to hold the office under three emperors. Trajan summoned Casperius to his camp, on the river Rhine in Germania. Cassius Dio writes that Trajan "sent for Aelianus and the praetorians who had mutinied against Nerva, pretending that he was going to employ them for some purpose, and then put them out of the way (ἐκποδὼν ἐποιήσατο)". (Note: Cassius Dio, Roman History 68.5.4, as translated and rendered in Foster & Cary 1925, pp. 368–369.) It is not known what "put them out of the way" means. Though Dio does not explicitly mention execution, Trajan's guards would have been involved if this were the case. Garzetti assumes that Casperius was indeed executed, as does Syme. The historian Sandra Bingham speculates that Casperius may have been dismissed and sent away from Rome, but allowed to retire, in order to remove an unwanted reminder of the means by which Trajan was made heir.

== Bibliography ==
- Berriman, Andrew; Todd, Malcolm (2001). "A Very Roman Coup: The Hidden War of Imperial Succession, AD 96–8". Historia: Zeitschrift für Alte Geschichte. 50 (3): 312–331. JSTOR 4436620.
- Bingham, Sandra (2013). The Praetorian Guard: A History of Rome's Elite Special Forces. London and New York: I. B. Tauris. ISBN 978-0-85773-286-6.
- Cassius Dio (1925). Foster, Herbert Baldwin (ed.). Roman History, Volume VIII. Loeb Classical Library. Vol. 176. Translated by Cary, Earnest. Cambridge, Massachusetts: Harvard University Press. OCLC 899735676.
- Collins, Andrew W. (2009). "The Palace Revolution: The Assassination of Domitian and the Accession of Nerva". Phoenix. 63 (1/2): 73–106. JSTOR 25651766.
- de la Bédoyère, Guy (2017). Praetorian: The Rise and Fall of Rome's Imperial Bodyguard. New Haven and London: Yale University Press. LCCN 2016958591 – via Internet Archive.
- Dzielska, Maria (1986). Apollonius of Tyana in Legend and History. Problemi e ricerche di storia antica. Vol. 10. Translated by Pieńkowski. Rome: "L'Erma" di Bretschneider. ISBN 88-7062-599-0.
- Eaton, Jonathan (2014). "Review: The Praetorian Guard". The Classical Review. New Series. 64 (1): 234–236. JSTOR 43301867.
- Garzetti, Albino (1974) [1960]. From Tiberius to the Antonines. Translated by Foster, J. R. London: Methuen. ISBN 0-416-70480-8.
- Gunderson, Erik (2021). The Art of Complicity in Martial and Statius: The Epigrams, Siluae, and Domitianic Rome. Oxford University Press. ISBN 978-0-19-289811-1.
- Jackson, Nicholas (2022). Trajan: Rome's Last Conqueror. Greenhill Books. ISBN 978-1-78438-710-5.
- Jones, Brian W. (1973). "Casperius Aelianus: An Enigma?". The Classical Journal. 68 (3): 277–279. JSTOR 3296387.
- Jones, Brian W. (2002). The Emperor Domitian. Abingdon: Routledge. ISBN 978-1-134-85313-7.
- Morgan, Llewelyn (2006). "Domitian the Second?". Greece & Rome. 53 (2): 175–184. JSTOR 4122469.
- Murison, Charles Leslie (2003). "M. Cocceius Nerva and the Flavians". Transactions of the American Philological Association. 133 (1): 147–157. doi:10.1353/apa.2003.0008. S2CID 162211747.
- Schwarte, Karl-Heinz (1979). "Trajans Regierungsbeginn und der 'Agricola' des Tacitus" [The Beginning of Trajan's Reign and the Agricola of Tacitus]. Bonner Jahrbücher (in German). 179: 139–175. doi:10.11588/bjb.1979.1.87006.
- Syme, Ronald (1958). Tacitus. Vol. 1. Oxford University Press. OCLC 310709.
- Syme, Ronald (1980). "Guard Prefects of Trajan and Hadrian". The Journal of Roman Studies. 70: 64–80. JSTOR 299556.
- Tuck, Steven L. (2015). A History of Roman Art. Chichester: Wiley–Blackwell. ISBN 978-1-4443-3025-0.
