= Gaius Trebonius Proculus Mettius Modestus =

Gaius Trebonius Proculus Mettius Modestus was a Roman senator of the 2nd century AD who held a number of offices in the imperial service, as well as serving as suffect consul in 103 as the colleague of Marcus Flavius Aper.

Modestus was a member of the Mettii. Hans-Georg Pflaum first traced the rise of this family, identifying their origins in Petelia, a small Greek-speaking town in Bruttium, whence they emigrated to Arles when Julius Caesar settled one of their ancestors, a soldier or centurion of his Legio VI, there. Modestus' immediate ancestors were his grandfather, Marcus Mettius Modestus, procurator of Syria, and his father Marcus Mettius Rufus, governor of Roman Egypt from the year 89 to 92, which made them prominent members of the equites order. His entrance into the Senate was facilitated by his uncle Mettius Modestus, suffect consul in 82. A brother Marcus Mettius Rufus is known, who died before he could reach the consulate.

Modestus clearly has a polyonymous name, although the identity of Trebonius Proculus has not been investigated, either as the person who adopted Modestus, or as his maternal grandfather.

Marcus Junius Mettius Rufus, suffect consul in 128, has been identified as his biological son.

== Career ==
He may be the same Mettius Modestus Pliny the Younger mentions in a letter to his friend Voconius Romanus. Bernard Remy dates his exile to the year 93, when Domitian punished a number of Senators on the grounds of conspiracy. Apparently the notorious delator Marcus Aquilius Regulus had a role in his exile, for Pliny describes in his letter with obvious delight how Regulus was in fear of Mettius Modestus, now that emperor Nerva recalled him from exile.

Two of the offices Modestus held are known. The first, as legatus pro praetore or governor of Lycia et Pamphylia, was from 99 to 102, or before he became consul. The locals memorialized his tenure by erecting a monumental triple-arched gate in Patara, Lycia (in modern-day Antalya Province, Turkey) which still stands. His second office was as proconsular governor of Asia in 119/120.

Political offices
Preceded by Publius Metilius Nepos; Quintus Baebius Macer	Roman consul 103 (suffect) with Marcus Flavius Aper	Succeeded by (A?)nnius Mela; Publius Calpurnius Macer Caulius Rufus
