= Faltonius Pinianus =

3rd century Roman proconsul of Asia

Faltonius Pinianus (c. 235 - aft. 286) was a Proconsul of Asia in 286 or 305. He was the son of Faltonius Restitutianus.

He married and had issue:

- Faltonius (born c. 260), married to Maecia Proba (born c. 270), daughter of Marcus Maecius Orfitus (born c. 245) and wife Furia (born c. 244), paternal granddaughter of Marcus Maecius Probus (born c. 220) and wife Pupiena Sextia Paulina Cethegilla (born c. 225), and great-granddaughter of Marcus Pomponius Maecius Probus, and had:
  - Faltonius Probus (born c. 295), married to Betitia (born c. 300), daughter of Betitius Perpetuus Arzygius, and had:
    - Faltonia Betitia Proba

== Sources ==
- Continuité gentilice et continuité sénatoriale dans les familles sénatoriales romaines à l'époque impériale, 2000
