= Titus Petronius Secundus =

Roman praetorian prefect from 94 to 96 AD

- Born: Unknown
- Died: 97; Rome
- Military career
- Allegiance: Roman Empire
- Service years: 94–96
- Rank: Praetorian prefect
- Commands: Praetorian Guard

Titus Petronius Secundus (died 97 AD) was a prefect of the Roman imperial bodyguard, known as the Praetorian Guard, under emperor Domitian, from 94 until 96. Prior to becoming Praetorian prefect, Petronius had served as governor of Roman Egypt from 92 until 93.

While governor of Egypt, Petronius is attested as hearing the Colossi of Memnon sing, one of many ancient Romans known to have witnessed this phenomenon.

The role of Petronius in the conspiracy which led to the assassination of Domitian on September 18, 96 is unclear. Brian Jones notes that although "the support of the praetorian prefects would obviously be one of the primary concerns of any would-be imperial assassin, ancient sources are nowhere near as unanimous as their modern counterparts in claiming" that Petronius was among a number of government officials involved. Suetonius fails to implicate either Petronius or his colleague Titus Flavius Norbanus in his account of Domitian's death. Cassius Dio simply writes that "it was said that" Domitian's wife and both prefects were aware of the plot. It is the much later author Eutropius who accuses Petronius of assisting Parthenius in killing Domitian.

Upon the accession of emperor Nerva, Petronius was dismissed as prefect. "They had been disloyal to one emperor," writes John Grainger, "and so their loyalty to the new one could not be assumed." Support for Domitian however remained strong in the army; they agitated for the deification of the late emperor. Dissatisfaction with the state of affairs ultimately led to a rebellion in which the Praetorian Guard, led by Casperius Aelianus, laid siege to the Imperial Palace and forced Nerva to submit and hand over those responsible for Domitian's death. The revolt was successful, and Petronius was murdered by the Praetorians.

Political offices
Preceded by Marcus Mettius Rufus	Prefect of Egypt; 92–93	Succeeded by Marcus Junius Rufus
