= Faltonius Restitutianus =

Faltonius Restitutianus (died 252) was a vir egrerius or eques who held several senior-level posts in the Roman Empire of the third century.

His career is known from a half-dozen inscriptions. Restitutianus first appears in an inscription recovered from Amasya in modern Turkey, which attests that he was procurator and praeses in the province of Pontus during the reign of Severus Alexander. His next attested post was praeses or governor in Mauretania Caesariensis with Aurelius Felix as procurator. Then in an inscription dated to 244, now conserved at the Capitoline Museums, Retitutianus appears as Praefectus vigilum, or Prefect of the Vigiles, with two other men, Aelus Florianus and Herennus Modestinus.

We have no evidence for his career during the brief reigns of the next two emperors, Philip the Arab and Decius. Restitutianus appears again as Praefectus Aegyptus, or governor of Roman Egypt, which post he held from 251 until his abrupt death. According to Guido Bastianini, his assistant Lissenius Proculus governed Egypt until a replacement could arrive from Rome.

He married and had a son, Faltonius Pinianus.

== Sources ==
Political offices
Preceded by Aurelius Appius Sabinus	Prefect of Aegyptus; 251–252	Succeeded by Lissenius Proculus
