= Maecia gens =

Ancient Roman family

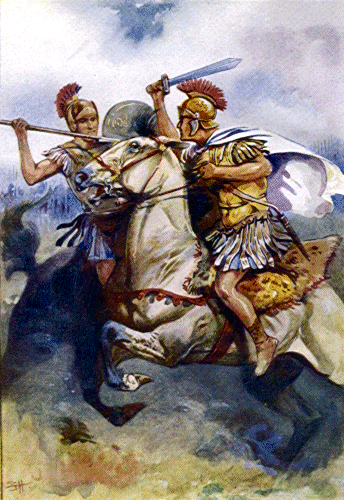
The combat between Geminus Maecius (left) and Titus Manlius Torquatus.

The gens Maecia was a plebeian family at ancient Rome. Members of this gens are rarely mentioned before the time of Cicero, but in Imperial times they rose to prominence, achieving the consulship on at several occasions.

== Members ==
- Geminus Maecius, commander of the Tusculan cavalry in 340 BC, during the Latin War. Meeting his former friend, Titus Manlius Torquatus, son of the Roman consul, he challenged him to single combat, and was slain after a furious battle. Manlius brought the spoils to his father in triumph, but the consul had his own son put to death for disobeying his command not to engage the enemy.
- Octavius Maecius, according to some accounts, (Note: According to others, Spurius Nautius led the allied cavalry.) leader of the allied cavalry in 293 BC, during the Third Samnite War. He employed a clever ruse to make his forces appear far more substantial than they in fact were, alarming the Samnite army.
- Spurius Maecius Tarpa, a contemporary of Cicero, whom Pompeius hired to select the plays performed at his games in 55 BC. At a later date, Octavian relied on him for his opinion of drama.
- Quintus Maecius, a Roman poet, known only from his twelve epigrams in the Greek Anthology, which are some of the finest in the collection.
- Marcus Maecius Rufus, proconsul of Bithynia, and consul suffectus during the reign of Vespasian.
- Lucius Maecius Postumus, consul suffectus in AD 98.
- Lucius Roscius Aelianus Maecius Celer, consul suffectus in AD 100.
- Marcus Maecius Celer, consul suffectus in AD 101.
- Maecius Marullus, named by the Historia Augusta as the father of the emperor Gordian I.
- Quintus Maecius Laetus, consul in AD 215; he had previously been consul in an uncertain year.
- Marcus Pomponius Maecius Probus, consul in AD 228.
- Marcus Maecius Memmius Furius Placidus, consul in AD 343.
- Rufius Achilius Maecius Placidus, consul in AD 481.

== See also ==
List of Roman gentes

== Bibliography ==
- Marcus Tullius Cicero, Epistulae ad Familiares.
- Quintus Horatius Flaccus (Horace), Satirae (Satires), Ars Poëtica (The Art of Poetry).
- Julius Capitolinus, "The Lives of the Three Gordians", in the Historia Augusta.
- Jan Gruter, Inscriptiones Antiquae Totius Orbis Romani, Heidelberg (1603).
- Johann Albert Fabricius, Bibliotheca Graeca, sive Notitia Scriptorum Veterum Graecorum (The Greek Library, or Knowledge of Ancient Greek Writers), Christian Liebezeit & Theodor Christoph Felginer, Hamburg (1718).
- Analecta Veterum Poetarum Graecorum (Fragments by Ancient Greek Poets), Richard François Philippe Brunck, ed., Bauer and Treuttel, Strasbourg (1772–1776).
- Anthologia Graeca sive Poetarum Graecorum Lusus, ex Recensione Brunckii (The Greek Anthology, or Works of the Greek Poets, or the Collection of Brunck), Friedrich Jacobs, ed., Dyck, Leipzig (1794).
- Poëtarum Latinorum Reliquiae (Surviving Works of Latin Poets), M. Augustus Weichert, ed., B. G. Teubner, Leipzig (1830).
- Dictionary of Greek and Roman Biography and Mythology, William Smith, ed., Little, Brown and Company, Boston (1849).
- Paul Gallivan, "The Fasti for A. D. 70–96", in Classical Quarterly, vol. 31 (1981).
