= Titus Betucius Barrus =

Ancient Roman orator

Titus Betucius Barrus was an orator of the Betutia gens of ancient Rome who lived in the 1st century BCE.

He was a native of Asculum in Picenum. The orator Cicero described him as the most eloquent of all orators outside of Rome.

In Cicero's time several of his orations delivered at Asculum were extant, and also one against Quintus Servilius Caepio, which was spoken at Rome, and which achieved some renown (Cicero described it as "famous").
