= Marcus Junius Mettius Rufus =

Roman senator

Marcus Junius Mettius Rufus was a Roman senator, who was active during the reign of Hadrian. He was suffect consul in the nundinium of April to June 128 with Quintus Pomponius Maternus as his colleague. In the Fasti Ostienses he is called Marcus Mettius Rufus.

Hans-Georg Pflaum identified him as the son of Gaius Trebonius Proculus Mettius Modestus. In his monograph on polyonymous names of the first centuries of the Roman Empire, Olli Salomies notes that it "has been suggested that he was a Mettius adopted by M. Iunius Rufus, prefect of Egypt in the nineties", but noting that the cognomen "Rufus" goes with the nomen "Mettius", "there need not be a connection between the prefect and the consul."

Political offices
Preceded by Lucius Caesennius Antoninus, and Marcus Annius Libo as suffect consuls	Suffect consul of the Roman Empire; 128 with Quintus Pomponius Maternus	Succeeded by Lucius Valerius Flaccus, and Marcus Junius Homullus as suffect consuls
