= Marcus Mettius Rufus =

1st century Roman eques and governor of Egypt

Governor of Roman Egypt
- In office 89–92
- Preceded by: Gaius Septimius Vegetus
- Succeeded by: Titus Petronius Secundus

Personal details
- Born: c. 1st century Arles, Gallia Narbonensis, Roman Empire
- Died: c. 1st century Roman Empire
- Occupation: Ancient Roman politician

Marcus Mettius Rufus was a Roman eques who flourished during the reign of the emperors Domitian and Trajan. He was appointed to a series of imperial offices, including praefectus or governor of Roman Egypt.

Hans-Georg Pflaum first traced the rise of his family, the Mettii, identifying their origins in Petelia, a small Greek-speaking town in Bruttium, whence they emigrated to Arles when Julius Caesar settled one of their ancestors, a soldier or centurion of his Legio VI, there. Rufus' father was Marcus Mettius Modestus, procurator of Syria; he is known to have a brother, Mettius Modestus, suffect consul in 82. Two men have been identified as sons of Rufus: Gaius Trebonius Proculus Mettius Modestus, suffect consul in 103; and Marcus Mettius Rufus, who died before he could reach the consulate.

== Career ==
While it can be assumed Mettius Rufus passed through the tres militiae, the first steps of every equestrian career, the earliest office Rufus is known to have held was praefectus annonae at some point prior to 88. This person was in charge of the public dole of bread to the inhabitants of Rome. He is attested as holding the office of praefectus of Egypt from some point before 2 August 89 (his predecessor is last attested in office 26 February 88) to some point after 12 July 90 (his successor is first attested on 14 March 92).

His primary concern as governor of Egypt was to safeguard the harvest and delivery of grain to the populace of Rome, but surviving letters from his administration show his responsibilities extended further. One records an edict he issued on 1 October 89 for the inhabitants of Roman Egypt: having learned that records of property ownership were allowed to become so out of date as to be unusable, Rufus issued an edict that all property owners register the lands they owned within the next six months, and that legal clerks tighten their processes for updating property records accordingly, as well as revise the records at least once every five years. The motivation for his edict may have been that the 14-year tax cycle for the province fell in that year.

Another record concerns the administration of the trade route between Coptos on the Nile and the Red Sea ports. Inscribed on 10 May 90 by Antistius Asiaticus, prefect of the port of Berenice, it lists the tax levied on goods brought through that port of entry, assessed per type of person: for example a skipper of a Red Sea boat is tariffed at eight drachmas, a sailor five drachmas, a craftsman eight drachmas, and a prostitute 108 drachmas.

Political offices
Preceded by Gaius Septimius Vegetus	Prefect of Egypt; 89–92	Succeeded by Titus Petronius Secundus
