= Interamici =

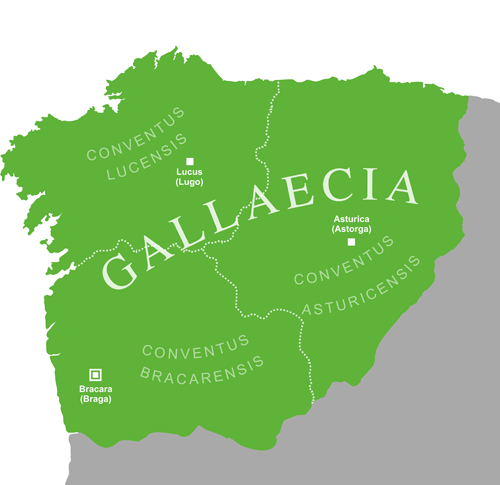
Map showing the approximate locations of the judicial convents of Gallaecia after the administrative reorganization carried out by Emperor Diocletian

The Interamici or Interamnici were a pre-Roman people or tribe, one of the Gallaeci tribes, living between some areas of modern southern Galicia (Spain) (in part of southern Ourense Province), and some areas of northern Trás-os-Montes, modern northeast Portugal. Their name means "Between Waters" (Between Rivers) because they lived between the southern banks of the Minius (Minho) and Sil rivers and the northern headwaters of the Laethes or Limia (Lima) and Tamica (Tâmega) rivers.

== See also ==
- Pre-Roman peoples of the Iberian Peninsula
