= Roman Bridge of Chaves =

Bridge in the river tamega in Chaves city, Portugal

Trajan's Bridge Ponte de Trajano
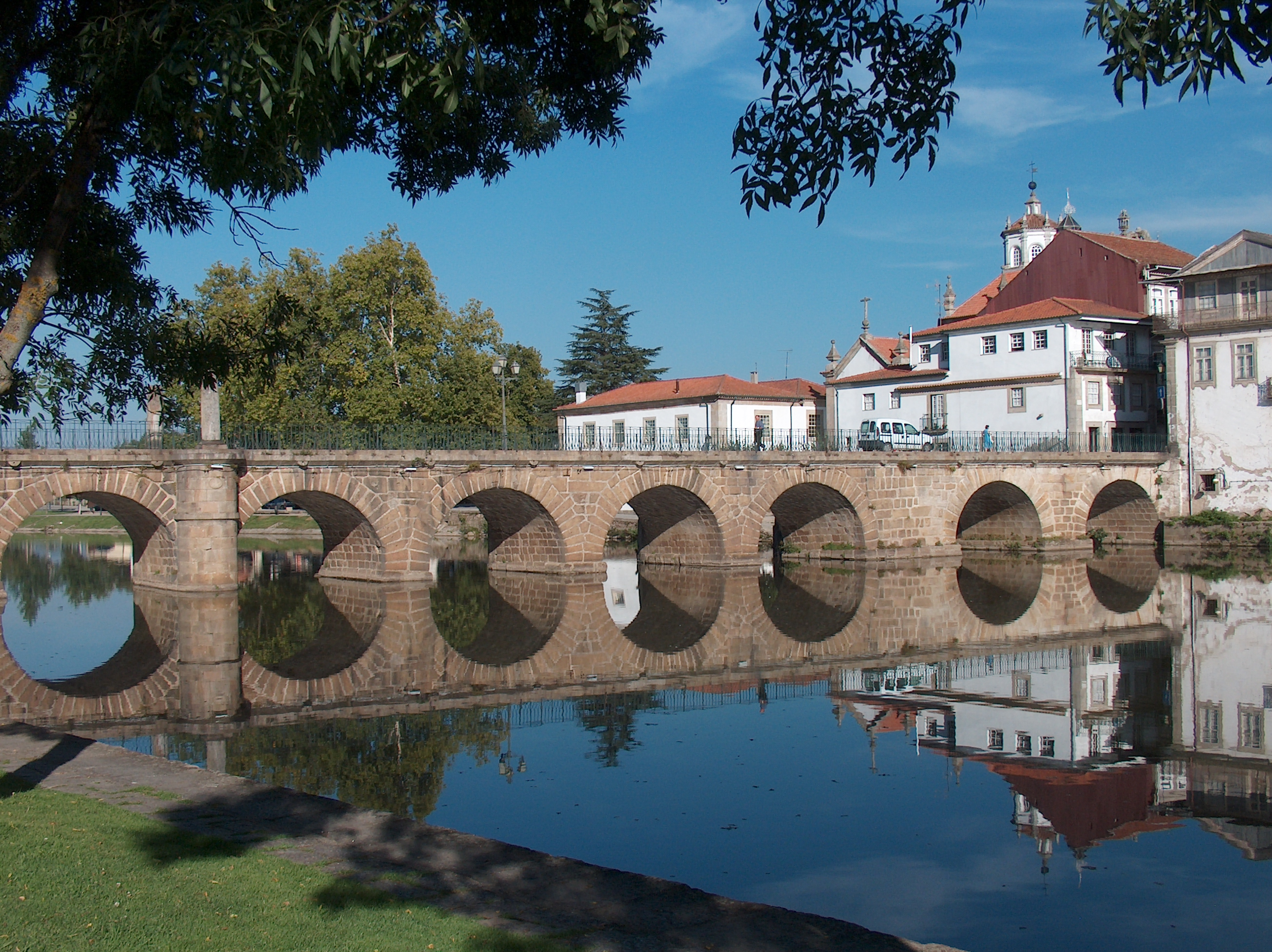
- An oblique view of the Roman bridge of Chaves
- Coordinates: 41.7383°N 7.4672°W
- Locale: Vila Real, Terras de Trás-os-Montes, Norte, Portugal
- Official name: Ponte de Trajano
- Other name: Roman Bridge of Chaves
- Named for: Trajan

Characteristics
- Design: Bridge
- Total length: 140 m (460 ft)
- Width: 8.9 m (29 ft)

History
- Built: 100 CE

Location
- Interactive map of Trajan's Bridge

Trajan's Bridge (Portuguese: Ponte de Trajano) is a Roman bridge in the civil parish of Santa Maria Maior, in the municipality of Chaves in the Portuguese northern subregion of Terras de Trás-os-Montes.

== History ==
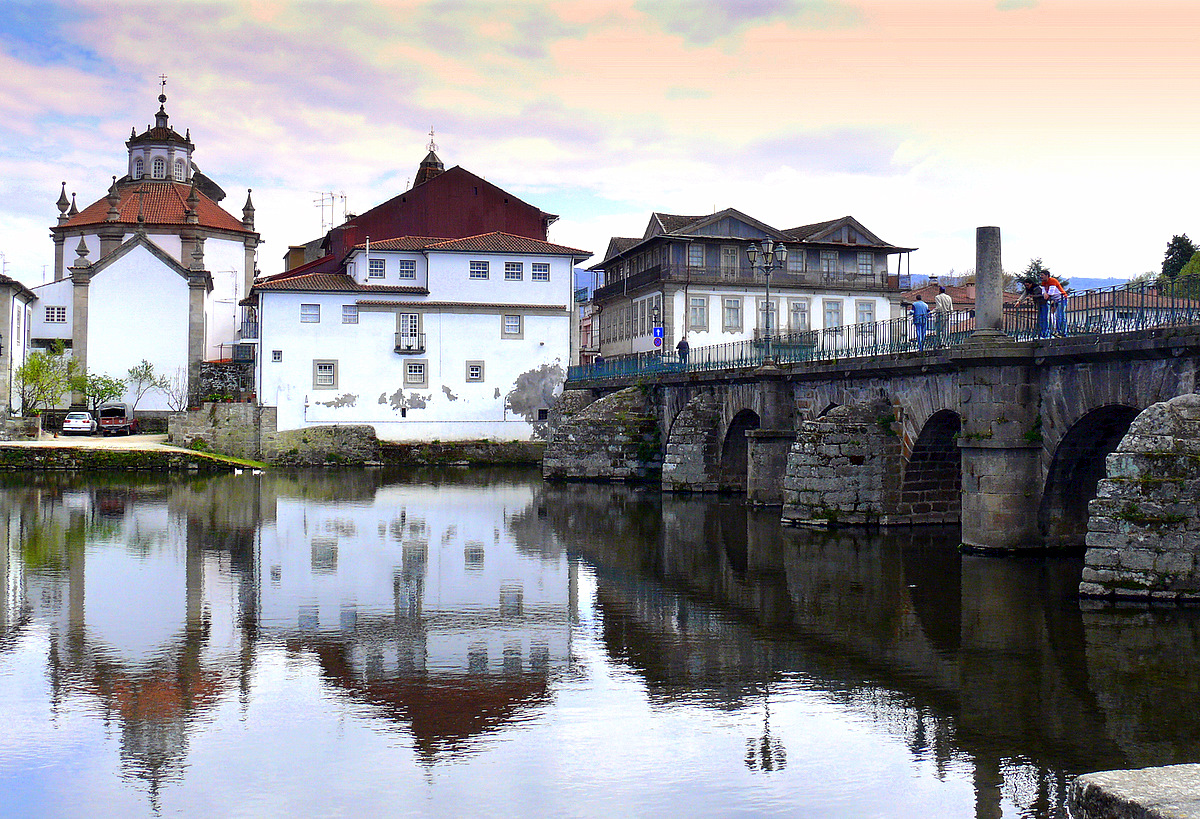
The view of the bridge and the southern margin

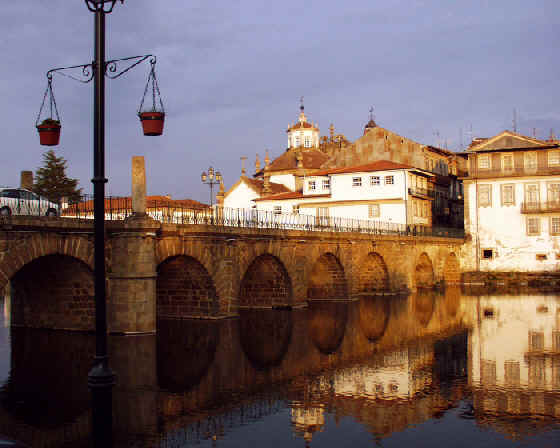
A downstream view of the bridge

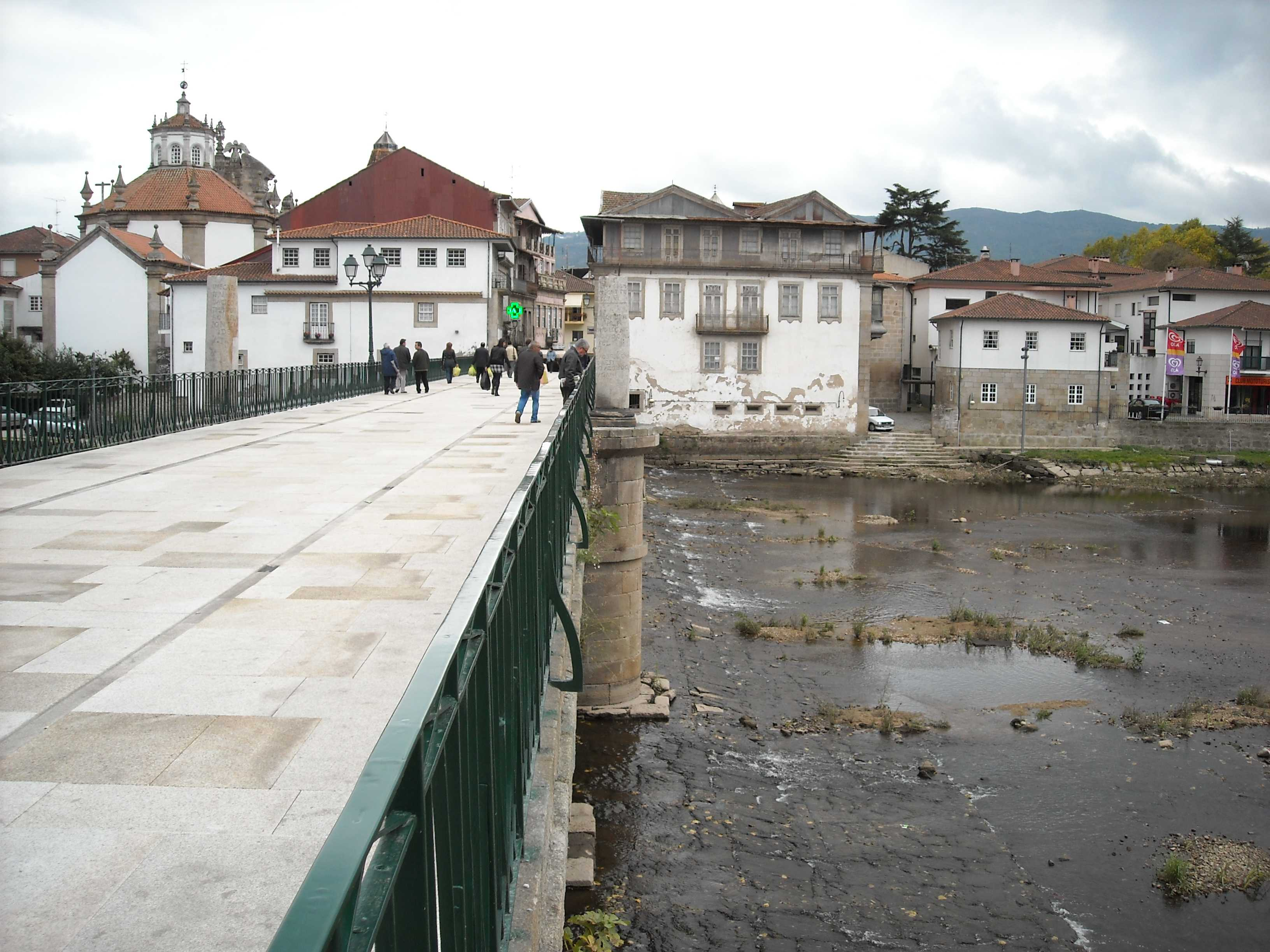
The road top of the bridge

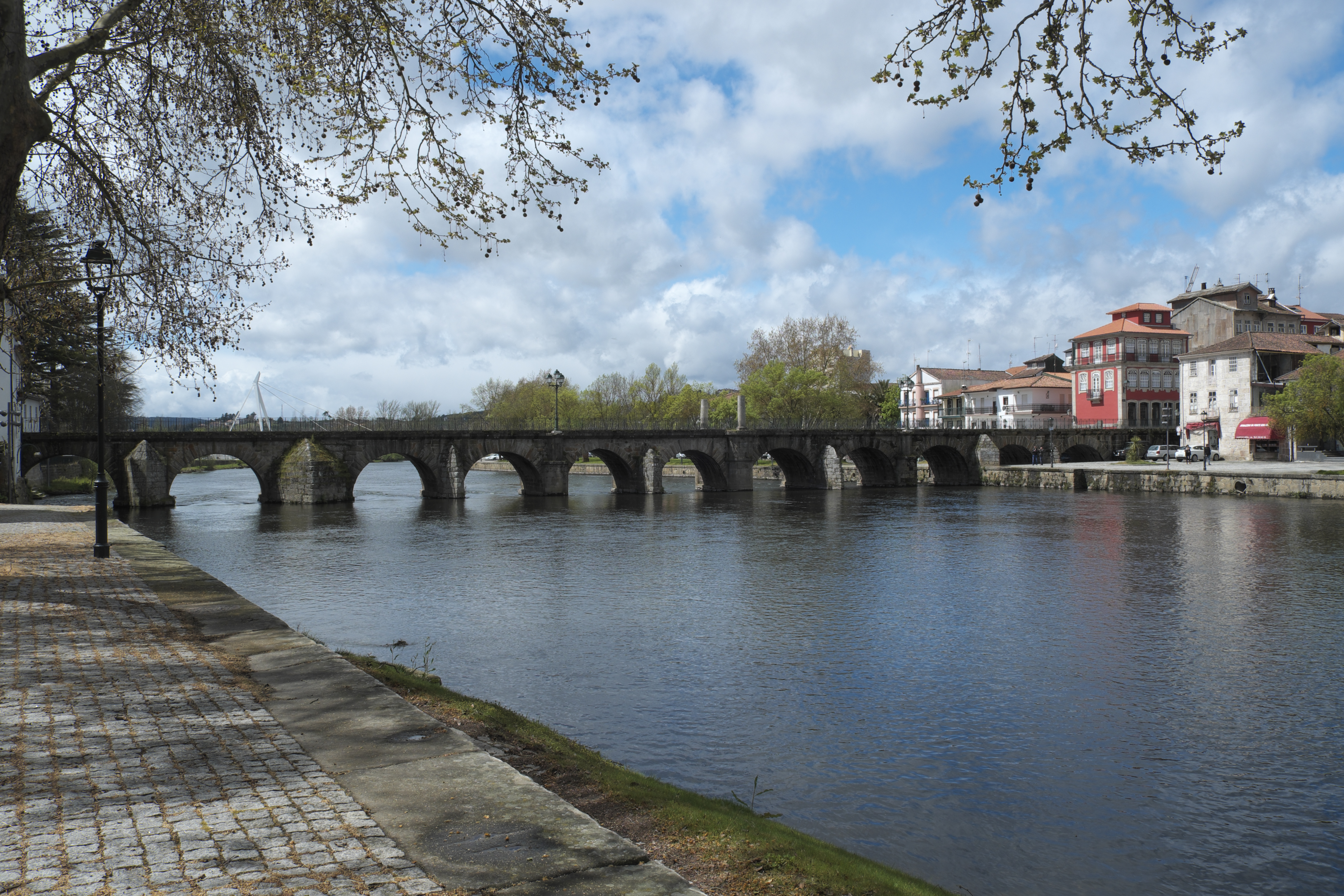
Downstream view of the bridge

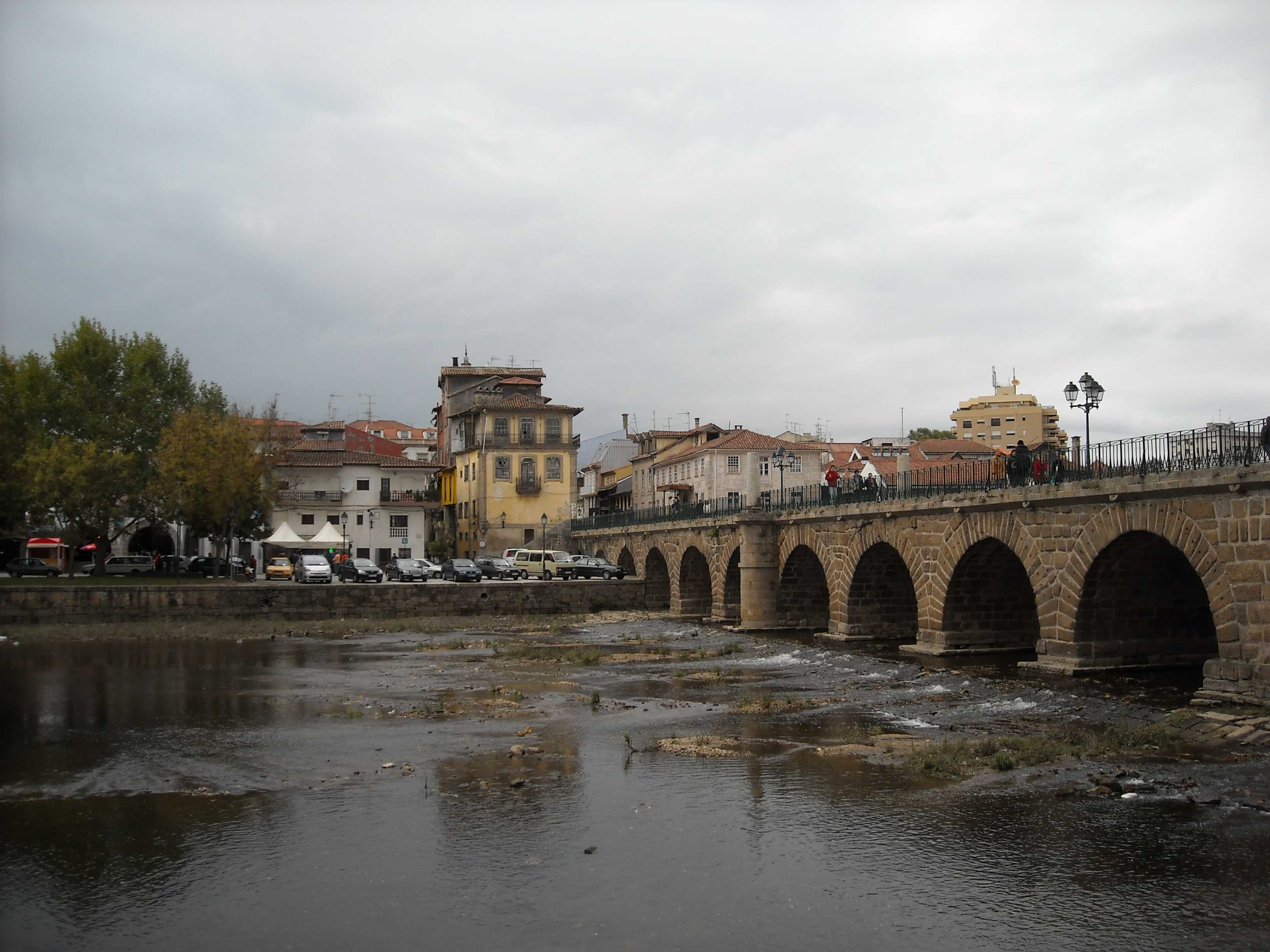
Upstream view of the bridge

The bridge was constructed at the end of the 1st century or beginning of the 2nd century, by engineers under the emperor Trajan. A commemorative column was erected in 104, referring to the bridge's construction by Flavian locals, at their cost. The column, now known as the Padrão dos Povos (People's Standard) was erected and dedicated by 10 civitas towards the Roman emperors Vespasian, Titus, the emperor's Legatus Augusti and the procurator of the 7th Legion Gemina Felix.

The bridge was first depicted in the book of Duarte d'Armas in the 16th century, as seen from the eastern bank, showing 14 arches, interlinked by talhamares with guards, and on the northern bank some watermills. On 7 December 1514, the first foral (charter) was issued by King D. Manuel and included a representation of the bridge in its coat-of-arms.

In 1548, Spanish Cardinal Luís de Castro, while travelling to Santiago de Compostela, passed through Chaves. While there he copied the inscription on the column that he found in the vegetable gardens of Simão Guedes. Similarly, in 1572, Ambróis de Morales while traveling between the Spanish kingdoms encountered a column opposite the bridge, at the home of João Guedes (likely son or grandson of Simão Guedes), and also copied the inscription of the column.

From the end of the 16th century and 17th century, the standard was implanted in the north end of the bridge, then re-planted (after it fell), resulting in the break in the inscription. In 1711 or 1723, a study by Távora was completed, and the inscription copied and published in his Notícias. In 1738, Rodrigo de Sande Vasconcellos, an artillery lieutenant-colonel, ordered the columns removed, placing one in the military square and another as a marker, inscribing some letters that over time became less perceptible (from the reference in the 1758 Memórias Paroquiais).

As Antonio Rodríguez Colmenero indicated, Rodrigo de Sande had ordered not only the decorating of the existing columns, but also ordered the construction of two new twin columns, to be placed on the town-side of the bridge.

The 1 November 1755 earthquake caused minimal damage to the site. According to a report by António Manuel de Novais Mendonça (prior of Chaves) in the Memórias Paroquiais, dated 27 March 1758, the bridge included 12 arches (while at one time there were 18 arches) and large and excellent stone blocks. This marked the suburbs of Madalena up to Couraças and the bridge was 92 geometric steps long, 3 feet wide. A 1762 drawing of the bridge showed it with 12 arches in 1762, without any decoration and its two columns on the city side of the river.

In the 19th century, the column was located in the central part of the bridge, in front of the commemorative marker. On 6 December 1878, the king suggested an enlargement of the bridge. There is an 1880 inscription in the oval cartouche, quoting the last time it was remodelled, the pillar construction and the placement of the commemorative marker. It was likely at this point that there stone guards for grates in iron.

At the time of the establishment of the Portuguese Republic, the two end columns were decorated, one with the Portuguese royal coat-of-arms and crown, and the other with fleuron, later placed in the Museum of Chaves. In September 1913, João Francisco Alves Carneiro de Lamadarcos was given permission to construct a metallic passageway over the bridge and the first floor of his house, part of the Hotel Comércio.

On 26 February 1914, the district director of Public Works deliberated on the repair of the bridge's staircase, which was in an advanced state of ruin. Approval was granted on 16 March to proceed with repairs.

During the 1940s, the city council constructed a long, narrow wall along the right margin of the river, resulting in the suffocating of four more arches, in addition to four already covered on the right and two others on the left margin, buried under premises. These four arches were already cut, following the earthenworks completed by the Junta Autónoma de Hidráulica Agrícola, while the other four were occupied by warehouses, which by 1942 were being used for local commercial establishments.

In 1956, a desilting project was begun along the length of the Tâmega River by the Direcção Hidráulica (Hydraulic Directorate) at a cost of 249.989$00, which included the construction of new accesses to the bridge. The Direcção-Geral dos Serviços Hidráulicos (Directorate-General for Hydraulic Services) on 22 August 1959 referred to the need to desilt the river and of expanding the width of the river. Following from this analysis, a commission was created to study the matter further by the DGSU, with representation by various institutions and municipal bodies. A new project was devised to enlarge the river, thereby alleviating three arches and desilting the river banks, while also allowing for improvement of the weir of Poldras, protection of the riverbank and burying the old mouth of the Rivelas river. The project was approved on 4 July 1961, by the ministry.

A project to improve the riverbank along the Tâmega River was initiated in 1962, in a phased approach, concluding in 1964. During the course of this project, various excavations were undertaken along the river, unearthing damage to the footings of 7 pillars of the 8 arches. The excavations also unearthed vestiges of the old stonework that had existed on the bridge before the construction of the lane way between Braga and Astorga.

In 1967, work to the footings was undertaken by the Comissão Regional de Turismo de Chaves (Chaves Regional Commission of Tourism), along with clearing of vegetation along the riverbanks and painting of the iron grating.

In the summer of 1980, during the dredging of the river, workers discovered a bulk of the bridge nearby and a cylindrical column, similar to the Padrão dos Povos. The epigraphic differences in the column and the wear made reading the complete text difficult, owing to the erosion caused by being submerged in the water.

On 1 June 1992, the bridge was placed under the responsibility of the Instituto Português do Património Arquitetónico (Portuguese Institute of Architectural Patrimony), by Decree 106F/92 (Diário da República, Série 1A, 126).

In 2001, 50 metres (160 ft) of Roman pavement stone was discovered in the riverbank of the local neighborhood of Madalena. These large slabs served as an oblique ramp. This path was used in the dry season, at the beginning of the 20th century, by farmers crossing the river to cool their animals and wagon wheels.

The bridge was illuminated from 1970. A study that included the protection zones for the walls, keep tower, bastion, Fort of São Francisco and Trajan bridge was begun in 1972. The Comissão Administrativa da Câmara (Administrative Commission) requested intervention to desilt the river in 1974. During the sequence of this petition, the Direcção-Geral dos Serviços Hidráulicos proposed unobstructing the river, resulting in a project to remodel the drainage system and sewage treatment station. It was at this time that the municipal government began working on the bridge, without the approval or intervention of the IPPC or DGEMN. Between 1981 and 1982, there were works to consolidate the talhamares and removal of their slabs. The IPPAR began clearing the cracks and improving the illumination.

In 2001, the Chaves city council began archeological prospecting during the remodelling work in the historic centre of Chaves.

Under the Polis program, in 2008, there was work to repair and improve the bridge, along with improving the riverbanks near the bridge.

== Architecture ==
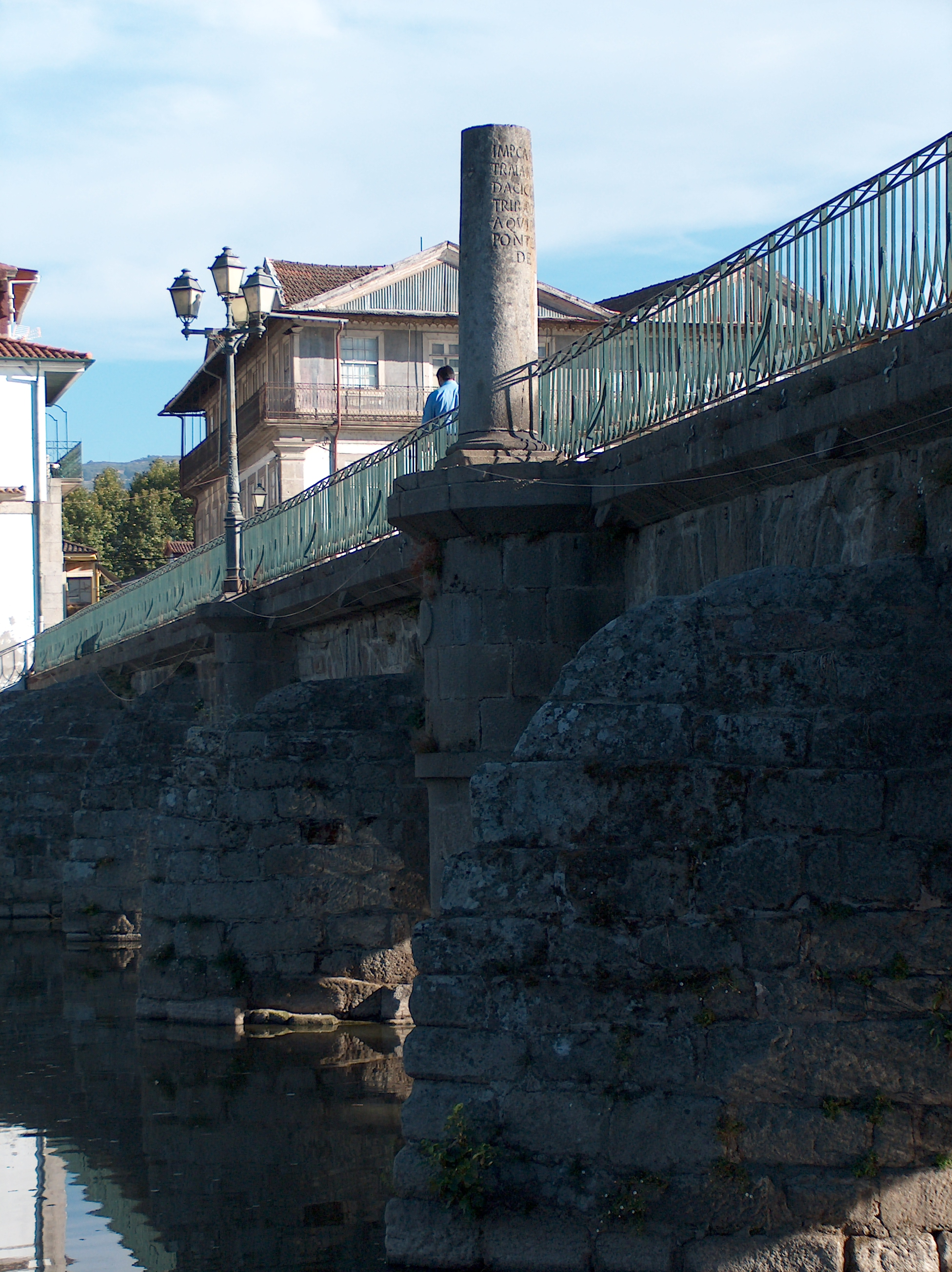
The placement of marker on the middle bridge

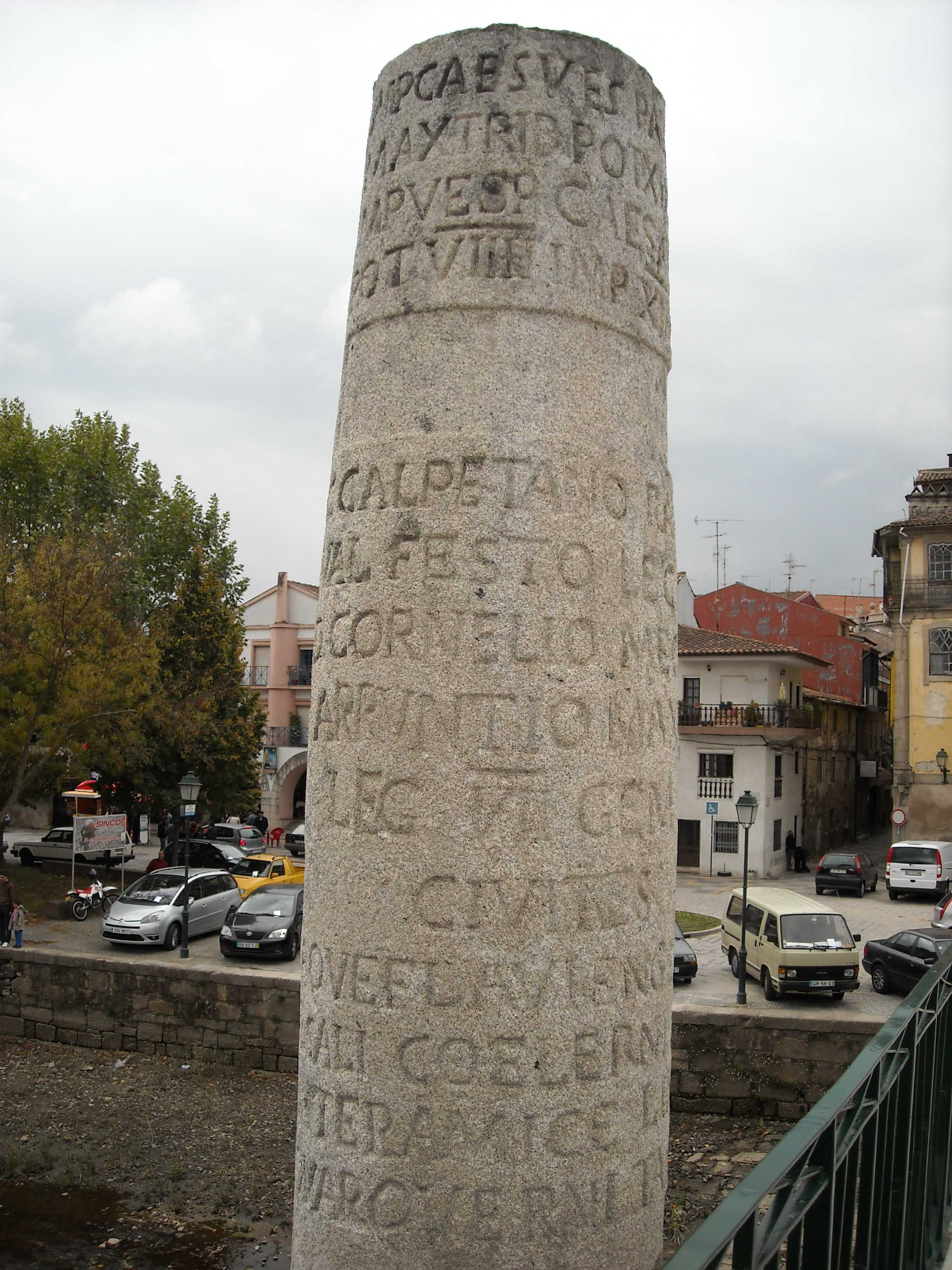
The commemorative marker on the top of the bridge

The bridge is situated over the Tâmega River, integrated into the urban space, addorsed on the left margin along the barrio of Madalena. On the right margin, are 4 arches on the riverbank, constructed in the middle of the 20th century, with western staircase. Over the four arches is a metallic laneway between the buildings constructed in the east.

The flattop bridge is 140 metres (460 ft) long, with face of regular padding over 16 visible arches and cushioned staves.

The two arches are on the left margin, next to the barrio of Madalena, are higher than the others and four on the right bank are covered by warehouses, torn by slatted rectangular openings. Upstream, the bridge is enhanced by eight slightly staggered prismatic talhamares, of substantially different size and height. Each structure, its ashlar stones serve as the fulcrum arches, while others appear only to addorse the bridge structure.

Halfway between the sixth and seventh arch there are (both on the upstream and downstream) an advanced semicircular pillar structure (oval masonry cartouche), inscribed with the date 1880. On the floor is a limited cornice, on which stand two cylindrical, monolithic landmarks, designated amount Padrão dos Povos, that celebrates the construction of the bridge. Between the fourth and fifth arches, instead of a talhamare, there is another semicircular pillar composed of two staggered bodies, both finished in cornice. Meanwhile, in the sixth talhamare is another pillar of the same size. The bridge flattop is covered in parallel slabs of granite, with lateral laneways in cement. Outwardly the bridge structure is marked by stone cornice and with regular intervals there are semi-circular gargoyles to drain water, in regular intervals. The feature also includes an iron grate.

The Padrão dos Povos has the following inscription:

IMP(eratori) CAES(ari) VE[SP(asiano) AVG(vsto) PONT(ifici)] / MAX(imo) TRIB(unicia) POT(estate) [XX P(atri) P(atriae) CO(n)S(uli) IX] / IMP(eratori) VESP(asiano) CAES(ari) AV[G(usti) F(ilio) PONT(ifici) TRIB(unicia) POT(estate)] / VIII IMP(eratori) XIIII CO(n)[S(uli) VI / [...] / C(aio) CALPETANO RA[NTIO QVIRINALI] / VAL(erio) FESTO LEG(ato) A[VG(usti) PR(o) PR(aetore)] / D(ecio) CORNELIO MA[ECIANO LEG(ato) AVG(usti)] / L(ucio) ARRVNTIO MAX[IMO PROC(uratori) AVG(usti)] / LEG(ioni) VII GEM(inae) [FEL(ici)] / CIVITATES [X] AQVIFLAVIEN[SES AOBRIGENS(es)] / BIBALI COEL[ERNI EQVAESI] / INTERAMIC[I LIMICI NAEBISOCI] / QVARQVE[R]NI TA[MAGANI]

Emperor Caesar Vespasian Augustus, Pontifex maximus, with Tribunal Power ten times, Emperor twenty times. Father of the fatherland, Consul nine times and son of Emperor Vespasian Caesar Augustus, Pontifex, exercising the Tribunal Power eight times, Emperor 14 times, Consul six... legatus Augusti pro praetore Gaius Calpetanus Rantius Quirinalis Valerius Festus, legatus Augusti Decius Cornelius Mecianus, procurator Augusti of the Legion VII Gemina Felix Lucius Arruntius Maximus, along with ten more nations, the Aquaflaviensis, Aobrigenses, Biballi, Coelerni, Equaesi, Interamici, Limici, Naebisoci, Quaquerni, Tamagani.

The commemorative column has the following inscription:

IMP(eratori) CAES(ari) NERVA / TRAIANO AVG(usto) GER(manico) / DACICO PONT(ifici) MAX(imo) / TRIB(unitia) POT(estate) CO(n)S(ule) V P(atri) P(atriae) / AQVIFLAVIENSES / PONTEM LAPIDEVM / DE SVO F(aciendum) C(uravit)

Emperor Cesar Nerva Trajan Augustus Germanicus, Dacicus, Pontifex maximus, with tribunicia potestas, consul 15 times, father of the fatherland; the people of Aquae Flaviae raised this bridge at their own cost.

== See also ==
- List of Roman bridges
- Roman architecture
- Roman engineering
- List of bridges in Portugal
