= Modeste (name) =

Notable people with name Modeste include:

== Given name ==
- André Ernest Modeste Grétry (1741–1813), French composer
- Modeste Demers (1809–1871), Canadian Christian missionary
- Modeste M'bami (born 1982), Cameroonian football player

== Surname ==
- Anthony Modeste (footballer born 1975), Grenadian footballer
- Anthony Modeste (footballer born 1988), French professional footballer
- Jimmy Modeste (born 1981), Cape Verdean soccer defender
- Teddy Lussi-Modeste (born 1978), French film director, screenwriter and literature teacher
