= French ship Modeste =

There are two ships of the French navy that have borne the name Modeste:

- Modeste (1759), captured in 1759 and taken into service as HMS Modeste. She was broken up in August 1800.
- Modeste (1786), captured in 1793 by HMS Captain and taken into service as HMS Modeste. She was broken up in June 1814.

== See also ==
- Modeste (1797), captured in 1797 by HMS Fox, was a French privateer and not a naval ship.
