= Marcus Pomponius Maecius Probus =

Roman consul in 228

Marcus Pomponius Maecius Probus (c. 195 – after 228) was a Consul in 228 AD.

He was the son of Marcus Maecius Probus and his wife Pomponia Arria.

In the genealogical reconstruction by C. Settipani, he married and had:

- Marcus Maecius Probus (born c. 220), married to Pupiena Sextia Paulina Cethegilla (born c. 225), daughter of Marcus Pupienus Africanus and his wife Cornelia Marullina, and had:
  - (Marcus Maecius Orfitus) (born c. 245), married to (Furia) (born c. 244), daughter of Gordian III and his wife Tranquillina, and had:
    - (Maecia Proba) (born c. 270), married to (Faltonius) (born c. 260), son of Faltonius Pinianus, and had issue

== See also ==
- Maecia gens

== Sources ==
- Continuité gentilice et continuité sénatoriale dans les familles sénatoriales romaines à l'époque impériale, 2000

Political offices
Preceded by Marcus Nummius Senecio Albinus, and Marcus Laelius Fulvius Maximus Aemilianus	Consul of the Roman Empire; 228 with Q. Aiacius Modestus Crescentianus	Succeeded by Alexander Severus, and Cassius Dio
