= Modesty Blaise (disambiguation) =

Modesty Blaise is a comic strip character created by Peter O'Donnell.

Modesty Blaise may also refer to:

- Modesty Blaise (novel), the 1965 novel by O'Donnell
- Modesty Blaise (1966 film), a 1966 film based upon the comic strip
- Modesty Blaise (1982 film), a 1982 made-for-television film based upon the character
- My Name Is Modesty, a 2003 direct-to-DVD film based upon the character

== See also ==
- "Modesty Plays", a song by Sparks on the album Music That You Can Dance To
- Immodesty Blaize, a burlesque dancer
