= Gaius Betitius Pius =

Gaius Betitius Pius (c. 175 - after 223) was a Patronus of Canusium in 223.

He was the son of Gaius Betitius Maximillianus (born c. 145), Suffect Consul.

He married Seia Fuscinilla (born c. 185), sister of Seius Sallustius, Roman usurper Emperor, daughter of Seius (born c. 155) and wife Herennia Orbiana (born c. 160), and paternal granddaughter of Publius Seius Fuscianus (c. 120 - after 189), Consul in 151?, PUR 187-189 and Suffect Consul in 188, and had:

- Betitius (born c. 205), married and had:
  - Betitius (born c. 230), married and had:
    - Betitius (born c. 255), married to Aurelia (born c. 260), daughter of Aurelius (born c. 235) and paternal granddaughter of Marcus Aurelius Cominius Arzygius (c. 205 - after 249), Consul in 249, and had:
      - Betitius Perpetuus Arzygius (c. 285 - after 312/314), Corrector Provinciae of Sicilia in 312/4

== Sources ==
- Continuité gentilice et continuité sénatoriale dans les familles sénatoriales romaines à l'époque impériale, 2000
