= Legio VII Gemina =

Roman legion

Map of the Iberian Peninsula in 125 AD, under emperor Hadrian, showing the Legio VII Gemina, stationed at Castra Legionis (León, Spain), in Hispania Tarraconensis province, from 75 AD until the 4th century

Legio VII Gemina (Latin for "The Twins' Seventh Legion") was a legion of the Imperial Roman army. It was raised in AD 68 in Hispania by the general Galba to take part in his rebellion against the emperor Nero. "Gemina" means the legion was dedicated to the legendary twin founders of Rome, Romulus and Remus, who were suckled by a she-wolf. The legion was deployed in the city called Legio (modern-day León, Spain) in AD 74 and remained in Hispania to the end of the 4th century.

Tacitus calls the legion "Galbiana", to distinguish it from the senior Legio VII Claudia, but this appellation is not found on any inscriptions. It appears to have received the appellation of "Gemina" on account of its amalgamation by Vespasian with one of the German legions, not improbably the Legio I Germanica.

Between 86 and 89 the Legion was commanded by the future emperor and native of the region Trajan.

After serving in Pannonia and in the civil wars, it was settled by Vespasian in Hispania Tarraconensis, to supply the place of the Legio VI Victrix and Legio X Gemina, two of the three legions ordinarily stationed in the province, but which had been withdrawn to Germania. The Antonine Itinerary, Ptolemy, the Notitia Imperii, as well as a few inscriptions all state that its regular winter quarters, under later emperors, were at Leon, but there are numerous inscriptions to prove that a strong detachment of it was stationed at Tarraco (modern Tarragona), the chief city of the province. The following are a selection, in order of time:

In the inscriptions the legion has the surnames of "P. F. ANTONINIANA", "P. F. ALEXANDRIANA", and "P. F. SEVERIANA ALEXANDRIANA"; and its name occurs in a Greek inscription as ΛΕΤ. Ζ. ΔΙΔύμη, while another mentions a χιλίαρχον ἐν Ἱσπανίᾳ λεγεῶνος ἑβδόμης. There is an inscription in which is found a "Tribunus Militum LEG. VII. GEMINAE FELICIS IN GERMANIA", from a comparison of which with two inscriptions found in Germany, it has been inferred that the legion was employed on an expedition into Germany under Alexander Severus, and that this circumstance gave rise to the erroneous designation of Γερμανική in the text of Ptolemy.

The legion had units stationed at their extended fortified camps:

- Tarraco, modern day Tarragona, under the direct command of the governor of the Tarraconensis province.
- Emerita Augusta, today Mérida, under the direct orders of the governor of the Lusitanian province.
- Asturica Augusta, today Astorga, near the gold mines to supervise and escort its imperial trains.
- Somewhere unknown in the north of Portugal near their gold mines.
- Tritium Magallum (Tricio in Rioja).
- Lucus Augusti (Lugo).
- Segisama (Sasamon Burgos) to control the main Roman Via of access to Aquitania.

Also under the legion were five auxiliary units, a cavalry wing, two cohorts of equitatae and two of peditatae:

- II Wing, Flavia Hispanorum civium romanorum, cantoned in Petavonium (near Zamora).
- Cohors I Celtiberorum Equitata civium romanorum, cantoned within Municipium Flaviae Brigantia (near A Coruña).
- Cohors I Galica Equitata civium romanorum, cantoned at Pisoraca, (Herrera de Pisuerga, Palencia).
- Cohors II Galica, cantoned in the unknown locality of "ad cohortem Galicam" (suspected to be in Portugal).
- Cohors III Lucensium, cantoned near Lucus Augustium (Lugo).

During the majority of its existence, the number of effectives under the military commander of the VII were usually around the 7,712 between auxiliaries and regulars, not counting local levies and other reinforcements sent from Rome for temporary services.

The station of this legion in the Gallaecia Roman province grew into an important city, León, that after the invasions of 409 AD in Iberia became part of the Suevic Kingdom, which resisted the attacks of the Visigoths until 586, when it was taken by Leovigild. It was one of the few cities which the Visigoths allowed to retain their fortifications.

The Roman bridge over the Tâmega River in Chaves, Portugal, then Aquae Flaviae, was built by the stationed legionaries of the Legio VII Gemina at the time of Trajan.

== Known members of the legion ==
Name	Rank	Time frame	Province	Source
Marcus Antonius Primus	legatus legionis	c. 69		Tacitus, Histories II.86
Marcus Ulpius Trajanus	legatus legionis	c. 89	Hispania Tarraconensis	
Lucius Attius Macro	legatus legionis	between 120 and 128	Hispania Tarraconensis	CIL II, 5083 = ILS 2289
Titus Vitrasius Pollio	legatus legionis	c. 128	Hispania Tarraconensis	CIL XII, 3168
Gnaeus Lucius Terentius Homullus Junior	legatus legionis	c. 142	Hispania Tarraconensis	CIL II, 5084
Quintus Cornellius Senecio Annianus	legatus legionis	Before 134	Hispania Tarraconensis	CIL II, 1929
Quintus Tullius Maximus	legatus legionis	c. 165	Hispania Tarraconensis	CIL II, 2660
Tiberius Julius Frugi	legatus legionis	c. 166–c. 170	Hispania Tarraconensis	CIL VI, 31717
Publius Cornelius Anullinus	legatus legionis	171–172	Hispania Tarraconensis	CIL II, 2073
Sollius	legatus legionis	before 197	Hispania Tarraconensis	CIL IX, 5155
Gaius Junius Flavianus	tribunus angusticlavius	c. 125	Hispania Tarraconensis	CIL VI, 1620 = ILS 1342
Avitius Rufus	tribunus angusticlavius	2nd century		AE 1955, 228
Gaius Julius Scapula	tribunus laticlavius	c. 125	Hispania Tarraconensis	IGRR III.176-178
Lucius Neratius Proculus	tribunus laticlavius	c. 125	Hispania Tarraconensis	CIL IX, 2457 = ILS 1076
Tiberius Claudius Pompeianus	tribunus laticlavius	145-149	Hispania Tarraconensis	AE 1971, 208
Gaius Aemilius Berenicianus Maximus	tribunus laticlavius	first quarter 3rd century		CIL XII, 3163
Quintus Hedius Rufus Lollianus Gentianus	tribunus laticlavius	c. 175	Hispania Tarraconensis	CIL II, 4121 = ILS 1145; CIL II, 4122
Titus Flavius Rufus	centurio (veteranus)	Between 100-138	Italia, Moesia, Dacia	CIL XI, 20 = ILS 2082; CIL III, 971

== See also ==
- List of Roman legions
