= Betitius Perpetuus Arzygius =

Betitius Perpetuus Arzygius (c. 285 - aft. 312/314) was a Corrector Provinciae of Sicilia in 312/314.

He was the son of Betitius (born c. 255) and wife Aurelia (born c. 260), daughter of Aurelius (born c. 235) and paternal granddaughter of Marcus Aurelius Cominius Arzygius, paternal grandson of Betitius (born c. 230) and wife, great-grandson of Betitius (born c. 205) and wife and great-great-grandson of Gaius Betitius Pius and wife Seia Fuscinilla, sister of Seius Sallustius, Roman usurper Emperor.

He married and had:

- Betitia (born c. 300), married to Faltonius Probus (born c. 295), son of Faltonius (born c. 260) and wife Maecia Proba (born c. 270) and paternal grandson of Faltonius Pinianus, and had issue.
