= Aurelius Victor =

4th century Roman historian and politician

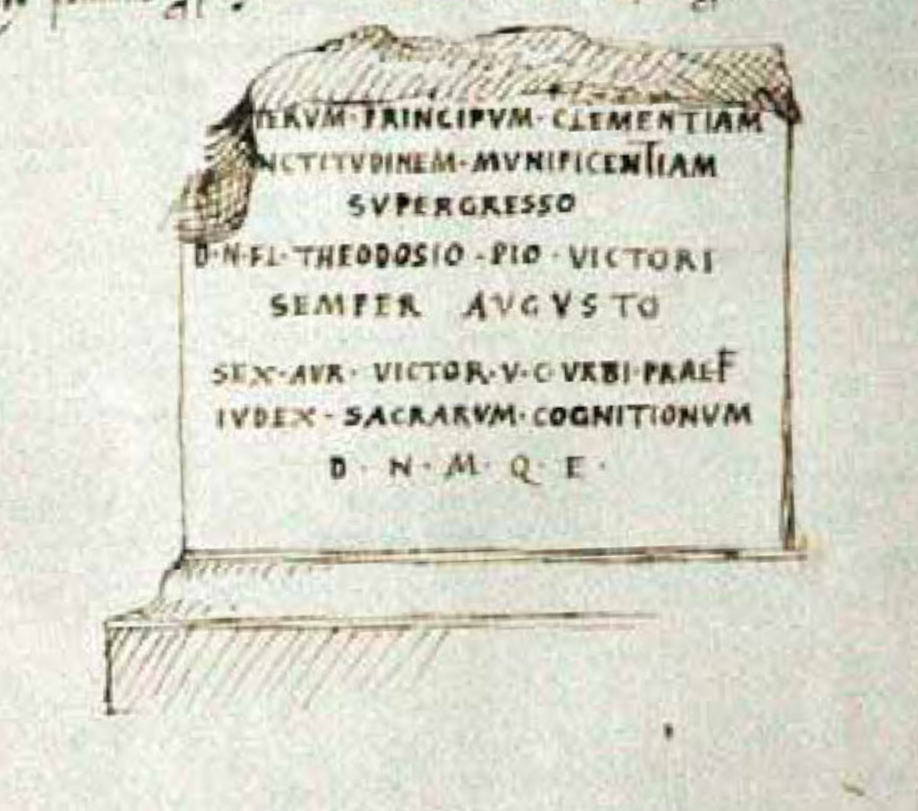
Base of statue dedicated to Theodosius by Sextus Aurelius Victor (CIL 6.1186)

Sextus Aurelius Victor (c. 320 – c. 390) was a historian and politician of the Roman Empire. Victor was the author of a now-lost monumental history of imperial Rome covering the period from Augustus to Constantius II. Under the emperor Julian (361–363), Victor served as governor of Pannonia Secunda in 361; in 389 he became praefectus urbi (urban prefect), senior imperial official in Rome.

His surviving work, entitled De Caesaribus is a brief epitome of his history, and was originally titled in the two surviving manuscripts Aurelii Victoris Historiae Abbreviatae. The work was published in 361.

Aurelius was born to a poor family in North Africa to an uneducated father. He was educated, first at Carthage and then at Rome. He apparently composed his history between 358 and 360. Following the publication, his reputation grew enough that Julian erected a bronze statue of him in Naissus.

Aurelius survived the death of the pagan Julian into the reign of the fiercely anti-pagan Theodosius I (347–395). It appears he became consul in 369, and suffect consul between 370 and 378. In 388 or 389, Theodosius appointed Aurelius urban prefect.

== Enmannsche Kaisergeschichte ==
In 1884, German scholar Alexander Enmann posited a hypothetical, lost manuscript to explain the similarities among Aurelius Victor, Eutropius, the author of the Historia Augusta, and others. Recently, however, this source has been suggested to be in fact the lost history of Aurelius Victor, of which his surviving works are only epitomes.

== Surviving works ==
Four small historical works have been ascribed to him, although only his authorship of De Caesaribus is securely established:

1. Origo Gentis Romanae
2. De Viris Illustribus Romae
3. De Caesaribus Aurelii Victoris Historiae Abbreviatae
4. Epitome de Caesaribus Libellus breviatus de vita et moribus imperatorum breviatus ex libris Sexti Aurelius Victoris (attributed)

The four have generally been published together under the name Historia Romana. The second was first printed at Naples about 1472, in 4to, under the name of Pliny the Younger, and the fourth in Strasbourg in 1505.

The first edition of all four books was that of Andreas Schott (8 volumes, Antwerp, 1579). A recent edition of the De Caesaribus is by Pierre Dufraigne (Collection Budé, 1975).

== See also ==
- Sirmium
- Sremska Mitrovica
- Syrmia
- Tetrarchy
- Praetorian prefecture
- Praetorian prefecture of Illyricum
- Roman provinces
- Roman Empire
