= Domitius Leontius =

Politician of roman empire

Flavius Domitius Leontius was a politician of the Roman Empire in the fourth century AD.

== Biography ==
He came from the city of Berytus, where a statue was built in his honor.

In 338 AD, Leontius was the Comes Orientus, serving under the Praetorian Prefect of the East, Septimius Acindynus. In 344 AD, Leontius became consul for the whole year, together with Flavius Bonosus until May, and after May together with Flavius Julius Sallustius.
