= Epitome de Caesaribus =

4th century Latin historical work

The Epitome de Caesaribus is a 5th-century Latin historical work based on the Liber de Caesaribus (also known as Historiae abbreviatae) by Aurelius Victor.

It is a brief account of the reigns of the Roman emperors from Augustus to Theodosius the Great. It is often attributed to Aurelius Victor, but was written by an anonymous author who was very likely a pagan. The author used the so-called Enmannsche Kaisergeschichte and the (now lost) Annales of Virius Nicomachus Flavianus (a friend of Quintus Aurelius Symmachus). Although very brief in length and not always reliable, it also contains some useful information such as how the late Romans perceived the Sassanian wars and descriptions of the affairs of the Tetrarchy as well as anecdotes of various emperors. The work also shows numerous anachronisms and inaccuracies, such as referring to Caracalla as the father of the later emperor Elagabalus, a rumour perpetuated by the Severan dynasty.

== Bibliography ==
- Schlumberger, Jörg A. (1974). Die Epitome de Caesaribus. Untersuchungen zur heidnischen Geschichtsschreibung des 4. Jahrhunderts n. Chr., C.H. Beck, Munich.
