= Hans-Georg Pflaum =

German-born French historian (1902–1979)

Hans-Georg Pflaum (3 June 1902, Berlin – 26 December 1979, Linz) was a German-born French historian.

== Life ==
Pflaum, who came from a Jewish family of industrialists, at first studied law in Breslau and Heidelberg, afterwards taking a position in his father's company. He was promoted in 1925 in Breslau. When the company fell victim to the global economic crisis in 1929, Pflaum turned to a career as an academic studying Ancient History and Classical Philology in Berlin, where he studied under Ulrich Wilcken, Wilhelm Weber, Eugen Täubler and Ernst Stein. After the National Socialist German Workers Party took control of the country, he left Germany in 1933 and continued his studies in Paris with Jérôme Carcopino at the Sorbonne. He also studied under the epigraphist Louis Robert. In 1937, Pflaum wrote a dissertation on the Cursus publicus during the Roman Empire and was to become a member of the Centre national de la recherche scientifique (CNRS).

After the French defeat in 1940, he had to give up his position at the CNRS; his thesis could only appear anonymously. In 1942, before the persecution, he fled to the South of France, where he could continue his research on the Roman procurators, which he submitted as a thesis after the end of the war in 1947. He worked again at the CNRS in Paris and was there in 1956 as Directeur de recherche. Since the 1960s, he also taught at the École Pratique des Hautes Études, where he repeatedly took guest professorships in various European countries as well as at Princeton University. In 1966 he was elected as a corresponding member of the Göttingen Academy of Sciences. From 1966 to 1978, Pflaum was co-editor of L'Année épigraphique.

== Bibliography ==
=== Books ===
- Essai sur le cursus publicus sous le Haut-Empire Romain, Paris, 1940.
- Le marbre de Thorigny, Paris, 1948
- Les procurateurs équestres sous le Haut-empire romain, Paris, 1950
- Inscriptions Latines d'Algérie, t. I, vol. I : Inscriptions de la confédération cirtéenne, de Cuicul et de la tribu des Suburbures recueillies par Stéphane Gsell, préparées par E.Albertini et J. Zeiller, publiées par H.-G. Pflaum, Paris, 1957.
- Les carrières procuratoriennes équestres sous le haut-empire romain, Paris, 1960
- Les sodales antoniniani de l'époque de Marc Aurèle, Paris, 1966
- en collaboration avec P.Bastien, La Trouvaille de Canakkale (Turquie). Deniers et antoniniani émis de 261 à 284, Wetteren, 1969
- Abrégé des procurateurs équestres, Paris, 1974 (French translation of his article Procurator in Real-Enzyklopädie, vol. 23, 1 (1957), col. 1240–1279.
- Inscriptions Latines d'Algérie, t. II, vol. 2 : Inscriptions de la confédération cirtéenne, de Cuicul et de la tribu des Suburbures. Recueillies par Stéphane Gsell et publiées par H.G. Pflaum, Paris, 1976
- Les fastes de la province de Narbonnaise, Paris, 1978
- L'Afrique romaine (Scripta Varia I), Paris, 1978
- La Gaule et l'empire romain (Scripta Varia II), Paris, 1981
- Les carrières procuratoriennes équestres sous le haut-empire romain (Supplément), Paris, 1982
- Inscriptions Latines d'Algérie, t. II, vol 3 : Inscriptions de la confédération cirtéenne, de Cuicul et de la Tribu des Suburbures, recueillies et éditées par Hans Georg Pflaum et publiées par les soins de Xavier Dupuis, Paris, 2003

=== Articles by H.-G. Pflaum not included in his Scripta Varia ===
- « Du nouveau sur les guerres du Danube à l’époque de Marc Aurèle, d’après une inscription récemment découverte à Diana veteranorum en Numidie », CRAI 1956, p. 18-23 Read online.
- « Les gendres de Marc Aurèle »,Journal des Savants, 1961, p. 28-41 Read online.
- « Les Sodales Antoniniani », CRAI, 1961, 105–20, p. 118-121 (présentation de l'enquête développé dans l'ouvrage homonyme de 1966)
- en collaboration avec P. Bastien, « La trouvaille de monnaies romaines de Thibouville (Eure) », Gallia, XIX, 1961, p. 71-104 (Read online) and Gallia, XX, 1962, p. 255-315 (Read online).
- Das römische Kaiserreich, dans Propyläen-Weltgeschichte, Bd. 4, Berlin, 1963, p. 317–428.
- « Les correspondants de l’orateur M. Cornelius Fronto de Cirta », Hommages à Jean Bayet, (col. Latomus n° 70), Brussels, 1964, p. 544-560.
- « Le règlement successoral d’Hadrien », Historia Augusta Colloquium Bonn 1963, Bonn, 1964, p. 95-122.
- en collaboration avec Claude Brenot, « Les émissions orientales de la fin du IIIe s. après J.-C. à la lumière de deux trésors découverts en Syrie », Revue numismatique, 1965, 6–7, p. 134-205 Read online.
- « Les prêtres du culte impérial sous le règne d’Antonin le Pieux », CRAI, 1967, p. 194-209 Read online.
- « La mise en place des procuratelles financières dans les provinces du Haut-Empire romain », RHD, 46, 1968, p. 367-388.
- Le plaisir du collectionneur : les monnaies rares ou inédites, Collectionneurs et collections numismatiques. Monnaie de Paris - Exposition-concours, Paris, 1968, p. 103-109.
- « Forces et faiblesses de l’armée romaine du Haut-Empire », dans J.-P. Brisson dir., Problèmes de la guerre à Rome, Paris, 1969, p. 85-98.
- « La valeur de la source inspiratrice de la vita Hadriani et de la vita Marci Antonini à la lumière des personnalités contemporaines nommément citées », Historia Augusta colloquium 1968-69 Bonn, Bonn, 1970, p. 173-232.
- « In memoriam : Henri Rolland », Revue numismatique, 1970, 6–12, .162-163.
- « La valeur de l'information historique de la Vita Commodi à la lumière des personnages nommément cités par le biographe », Historia Augusta colloquium 1970 Bonn, (Antiquitas 4 : Beiträge zur Historia Augusta Forschung, Bd 10), Bonn, 1972, p. 199-247.
- « Les salaires des magistrats et fonctionnaires du Haut-Empire » dans Les Dévaluations à Rome. Époque républiaine et impériale. Actes du colloque de Rome (13-15 novembre 1975), Rome, 1978, p. 311-315 Read online.
- « Trésor d'antoniniani de la seconde moitié du IIIe trouvé en Syrie », Mélange de numismatique, d'archéologie et d'histoire offerts à Jean Lafaurie, Paris, 1980, p. 145-152.

=== Studies about Hans-Georg Pflaum ===
- M. Clauss, B. Holtheide avec la collaboration de X. Loriot, « Bibliographie von Hans-Georg Pflaum », Arheoloski Vestnik, 28, 1977, p. 235-244 (180 titres de 1940 à 1975).
- Marcel Le Glay, "Hans-Georg Pflaum", Epigraphica, 42, 1980, p. 212-230.
- Azédine Beschaouch, Marcel Le Glay, « H.-G. Pflaum (1902-1979)», MEFRA, 92–2, 1980, p. 563-565 Read online.
- Demougin, Ségolène; Xavier Loriot; Pierre Cosme; Sabine Lefebvre (2006). H.-G. Pflaum, un historien du XXe : actes du colloque international, Paris les 21, 22 et 23 octobre 2004 (in French). Geneva: Droz. ISBN 2-600-01099-8..
- Tadeusz Zawadzki: Un vrai Européen: Hans-Georg Pflaum (1902–1979), dans Wlodzimierz Appel: Magistri et discipuli. Kapitel zur Geschichte der Altertumswissenschaften im 20. Jahrhundert. Torun, 2002, pp. 101–113, ISBN 8-323-11521-4.
- Gedächtnisschrift für Hans-Georg Pflaum (coll. « Zeitschrift für Papyrologie und Epigraphik »), Bonn, Habelt, 1981 (volume de Mélanges en l'honneur de H.-G. Pflaum).
