= Julia (mother of Mark Antony) =

Roman figure (104 – after 39 BC)

Julia Antonia
- Born: 104 BC
- Spouse(s): Marcus Antonius Creticus; Publius Cornelius Lentulus Sura
- Children: Antonia; Marcus Antonius; Gaius Antonius; Lucius Antonius
- Parents: Lucius Julius Caesar (father); Fulvia (mother)

Julia (104 BC – after 39 BC) was the mother of the triumvir general Mark Antony.

== Biography ==
=== Early life ===
She was the daughter of Lucius Julius Caesar (the consul of 90 BC) and Fulvia. She and her brother Lucius Julius Caesar (who was consul in 64 BC) were born and raised in Rome.

Julia was a third-cousin of Julius Caesar (their great-grandparents Gaius and Sextus Julius Caesar were siblings).

=== Marriages ===
Julia married Marcus Antonius Creticus, a man of a senatorial family. Their sons were the triumvir Mark Antony, Gaius Antonius and Lucius Antonius. Because of their kinship through her, Gaius Julius Caesar was obliged to promote the political careers of her sons, despite his distaste for their father and his generally low opinion of their abilities. After Julia's first husband died in 74 BC, she married Publius Cornelius Lentulus Sura, a politician who in 63 BC was involved in the Catilinarian conspiracy and was executed on the orders of Cicero.

Julia had raised her sons through her marriages. Plutarch describes her as one of the "most nobly born and admirable women of her time". The following clause from Plutarch describes her relationship with her first husband:

His father was Antony, surnamed of Crete, not very famous or distinguished in public life, but a worthy good man, and particularly remarkable for his liberality, as may appear from a single example. He was not very rich, and was for that reason checked in the exercise of his good nature by his wife. A friend that stood in need of money came to borrow of him. Money he had none, but he bade a servant bring him water in a silver basin, with which, when it was brought, he wetted his face, as if he meant to shave, and, sending away the servant upon another errand, gave his friend the basin, desiring him to turn it to his purpose. And when there was afterwards a great inquiry for it in the house, and his wife was in a very ill humour, and was going to put the servants one by one to the search, he acknowledged what he had done, and begged her pardon.

— Plutarch, Antony 1

=== Later life ===
Elsewhere Plutarch illustrates her character with an episode from the proscription of 43 BC, during the Second Triumvirate:

His uncle, Lucius Caesar, being closely pursued, took refuge with his sister, who, when the murderers had broken into her house and were pressing into her chamber, met them at the door, and spreading out hands, cried out several times. "You shall not kill Lucius Caesar till you first dispatch me who gave your general his birth!" and in this manner she succeeded in getting her brother out of the way, and saving his life.

— Plutarch, Antony 20

During the Perusine War (modern Perugia) between 41 BC-40 BC, Julia left Rome, although Octavian (future Roman Emperor Augustus) treated her with kindness. She never trusted Sextus Pompeius. When Sextus Pompeius was in Sicily, Julia had sent to Greece for Antony, a distinguished escort and convoy of triremes. After the reconciliation of the triumvirs, Julia returned with Antony to Italy in 39 BC and was probably present at the meeting with Sextus Pompeius at Misenum.

== See also ==
- List of Roman women

== Sources ==
- Plutarch's biography of Antony (from the Parallel Lives)
- William Smith (ed., 1849). "Julia (2)" Dictionary of Greek and Roman Biography and Mythology. John Murray, London.
