= Pro Plancio =

54 BCE defence speech by Cicero

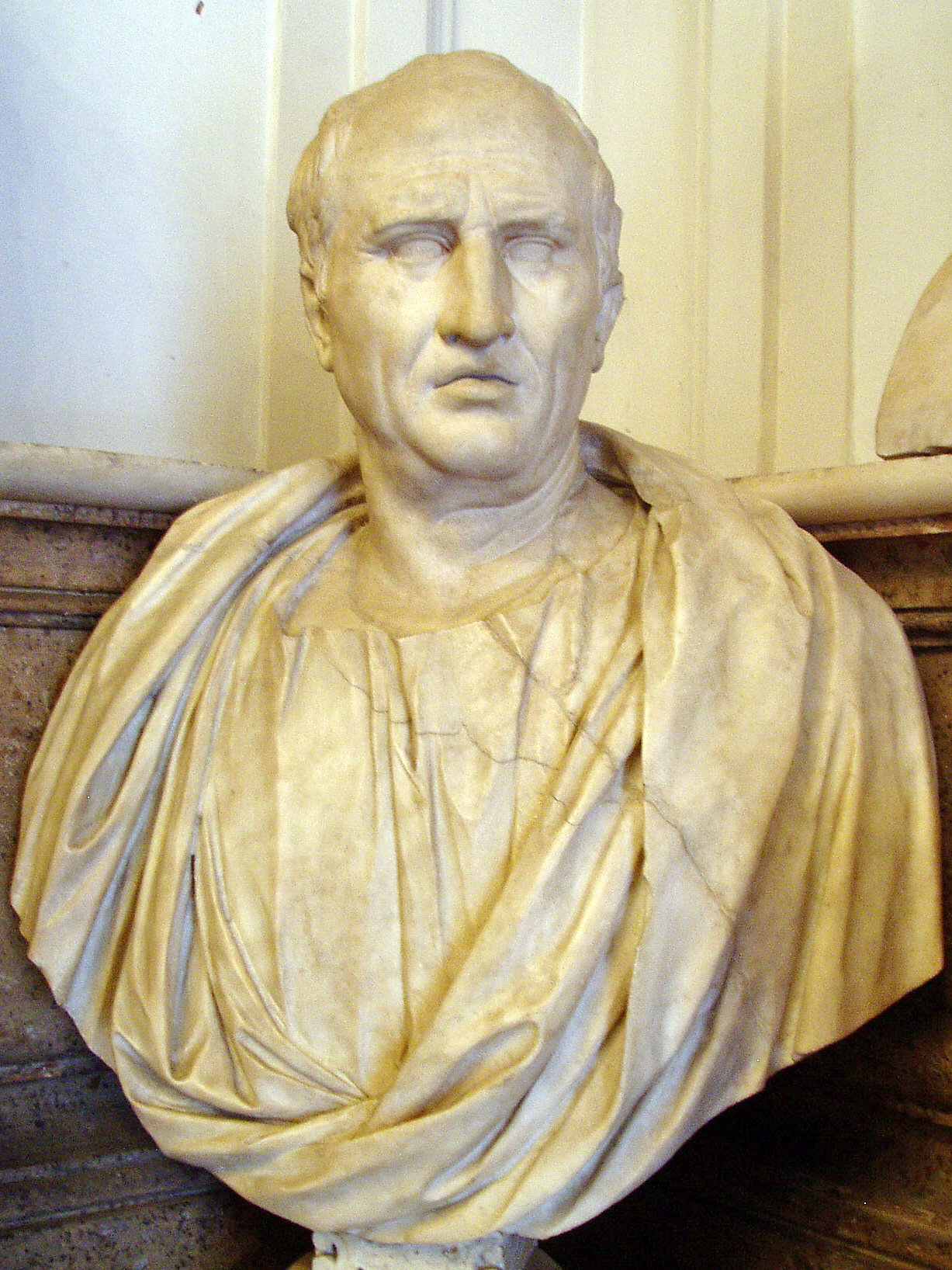
- A bust of Cicero, who delivered the Pro Plancio, from the 1st century CE
- Date: September 54 BCE
- Location: Roman Forum, Rome
- Motive: Defence speech for Cnaeus Plancius
- Participants: Marcus Tullius Cicero
- Text of the speech at Latin Wikisource

The Pro Plancio, sometimes named as the Pro Cn. Plancio (Note: Cn. is the abbreviated form of the Roman praenomen Gnaeus.) or the Planciana, was a speech given by the Roman lawyer and statesman Cicero in September 54 BCE. In the speech, delivered in the Roman Forum, Cicero defended Gnaeus Plancius, who had been elected as aedile (a junior civic official) the previous year, against a charge of electoral malpractice (ambitus) levelled by Marcus Iuventius Laterensis, one of his defeated opponents. The outcome of the trial is not known, though it is often suggested that Cicero won.

Plancius was prosecuted under the lex Licinia de sodaliciis, which criminalised the improper use of electoral associations (sodalitates); the prosecution, conducted by Laterensis with the assistance of Lucius Cassius Longinus, appears to have offered little evidence that Plancius had specifically committed this crime, rather than more general electoral infractions. In the Pro Plancio, Cicero defends Plancius's character and asserts the legitimacy of his election, claiming that Laterensis had made his prosecution under the lex Licinia in order to benefit from its unusual process of jury selection, which advantaged the prosecution. Throughout the speech, Cicero emphasises his twofold friendship with Laterensis and Plancius, who had both assisted him during a period of exile in 58–57 BCE. The bulk of the speech deals not with the charges against Plancius, but with asserting his personal merits and those of Cicero himself.

The speech was described by James Smith Reid as "a thoroughly artistic handling of a somewhat ordinary theme". (Note: Quoted in Berry 2004, p. 60.) Cicero makes reference to works of early Latin literature, such as the poetry of Ennius, and to the philosopher Plato's Crito, and makes extensive use of the rhetorical technique of sermocinatio. Cicero edited and published the speech; it is known from sporadic references in classical literature and surviving papyrus manuscripts, but was relatively neglected by ancient rhetoricians in comparison to the rest of Cicero's speeches. However, it was widely copied in manuscripts from the early modern period, and was known to the fourteenth-century humanist Petrarch.

== Background ==
The Pro Plancio was delivered in September 54 BCE, in the Roman Forum. In the speech, Cicero attempted to defend Gnaeus Plancius against a charge of electoral malpractice (ambitus) levelled by Marcus Iuventius Laterensis, whom Plancius had defeated in elections for the post of curule aedile, a junior magistracy with responsibility for public buildings and festivals. Plancius was defended by Cicero, probably in addition to Quintus Hortensius. (Note: Cicero alludes to remarks made by Hortensius on the previous day in section 37 of the speech: this is generally taken as evidence that Hortensius represented Plancius alongside him, though is not conclusive proof that he was directly involved in the case.) Laterensis was, in turn, assisted by Lucius Cassius Longinus.

=== Protagonists ===
==== Cicero ====
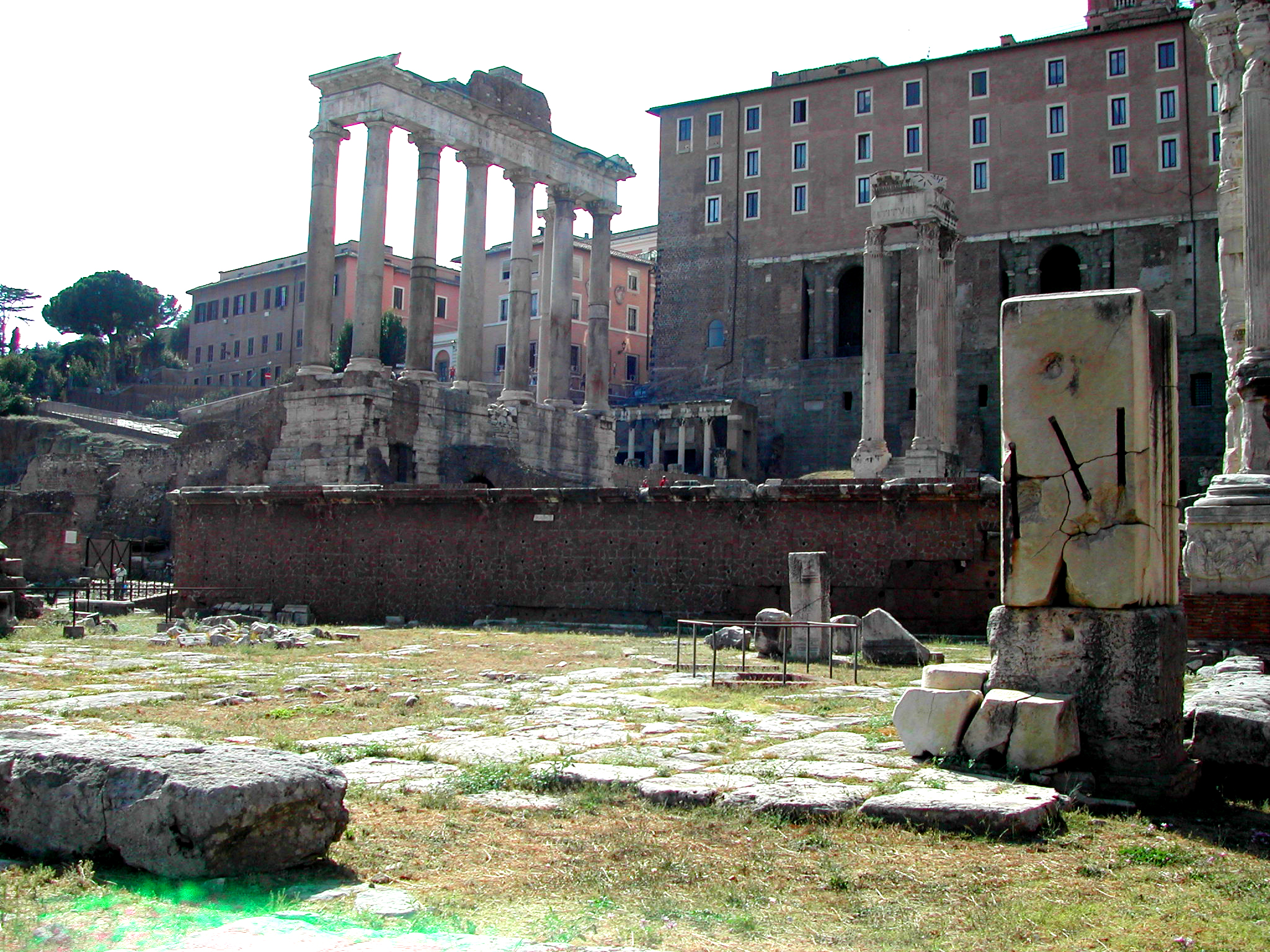
The Roman Forum, where Cicero delivered the Pro Plancio in 54 BCE

As consul in 63 BCE, Cicero had revealed the conspiracy of Lucius Sergius Catilina (Catiline), a failed consular candidate who had attempted to seize power in a coup. On 5 December of that year, Cicero had Catiline's supporters in Rome executed without trial, a decision which was widely condemned. Cicero's political enemy, Publius Clodius Pulcher, passed a law as tribune in February 58 BCE condemning anyone who had executed Roman citizens without a trial. The law was seen as an attack on Cicero, who fled Rome into exile shortly after its passage; Clodius in turn secured a formal proclamation of exile (aquae et ignis interdictio (Note: Literally, 'forbidding of water and fire'.)) against him in early April. Cicero's exile proved an enduring source of reputational damage to him, and he referred to it frequently in his subsequent speeches.

After his return from exile in 57 BCE, Cicero's legal work largely consisted of defending allies of the ruling triumvirs and his own personal friends and allies; although he had opposed the triumvirate before his exile, he reversed his stance after Pompey and Caesar reconciled at the Luca Conference in 56. In that year, he defended his former pupil Marcus Caelius Rufus against a charge of murder. (Note: Englert 2010. On Caelius's case, see Berry 2006, p. xx.) He subsequently defended, under the influence of the triumvirs, his former enemies Publius Vatinius (in August 54 BCE) and Marcus Aemilius Scaurus (between July and September), which weakened his prestige and sparked attacks on his integrity. Luca Grillo has suggested these cases as the source of the poet Catullus's double-edged comment that Cicero was "the best defender of anybody". (Note: Grillo 2014, p. 215, quoting Catullus 49.7.) (Note: The phrase can be read either as meaning that Cicero is better than all other lawyers, or else the most undiscriminating about whom he represents – willing to defend anybody.)

==== Gnaeus Plancius ====
Gnaeus Plancius was a member of the equestrian class, the son of a tax collector (publicanus) from the Lucanian town of Atina. In 61–60 BCE, Cicero had represented an association (societas) of tax-collectors, including Plancius's father, (Note: Also called Gnaeus Plancius.) in their attempt to reduce their financial obligations to the Roman state. The younger Plancius was a supporter of Pompey the Great, and in turn a protégé of Marcus Licinius Crassus: these two men, along with Julius Caesar, formed the triumvirate.

When the exiled Cicero arrived at Dyrrachium in western Greece late in April 58 BCE, Plancius was serving as a quaestor (a junior financial official) on the staff of Lucius Appuleius Saturninus, the governor of Macedonia. Plancius travelled to meet Cicero, and took him to stay in his official residence (quaestorium) in Thessalonica, where Cicero remained until the following November, at which point Plancius was soon to return to Rome following the appointment of a new governor, Lucius Calpurnius Piso Caesoninus. As Cicero later recounted their meeting in the Pro Plancio, Plancius took off his official insignia, put on mourning garb, and embraced Cicero, too overcome by tears to speak. (Note: Lintott 2008, p. 218. The meeting is recounted at Pro Plancio 97–98.)

Plancius was subsequently elected as a plebeian tribune in 56 BCE. He then successfully ran for curule aedile in 55 BCE, with Crassus's support, in an election that Lily Ross Taylor has described as "a travesty of Roman free institutions". The election results were declared void, following corruption and violence during the campaign, and the election repeated in 54: Plancius was again elected, alongside Aulus Plautius. (Note: Alexander 2010, p. 131. Plautius's name is sometimes spelled "Plotius": see Alexander 2010, p. 131 and Harlan 1995, p. 115.) His election as aedile made Plancius the first in his family to enter the senate. It is debated whether Plancius served as aedile in 55, or was due to begin his year of office when prosecuted in 54. (Note: For the competing arguments, see Alexander 2010, pp. 130–132.)

==== Marcus Iuventius Laterensis ====
Marcus Iuventius Laterensis was from an ancient noble family of Rome. He had served as a quaestor and proquaestor in Cyrene, where Michael Alexander judges that he was "more than usually upright" in his dealings. Christopher Craig has written that Laterensis's more elevated social background would have favoured his case, as ambitus trials customarily involved comparing the social standing (dignitas) of the respective parties.

During Cicero's exile, Laterensis had protected his relatives who remained in Italy, and made petitions for Cicero to be recalled. Like Cicero, Laterensis had been an early opponent of the triumvirs – he had withdrawn his candidacy for tribune in 59 BCE, because those elected were obliged to swear to uphold the laws of Caesar. However, unlike Cicero, Laterensis had maintained this opposition: he used Cicero's change of sides to attack the latter's integrity during Plancius's case.

=== Prosecution ===
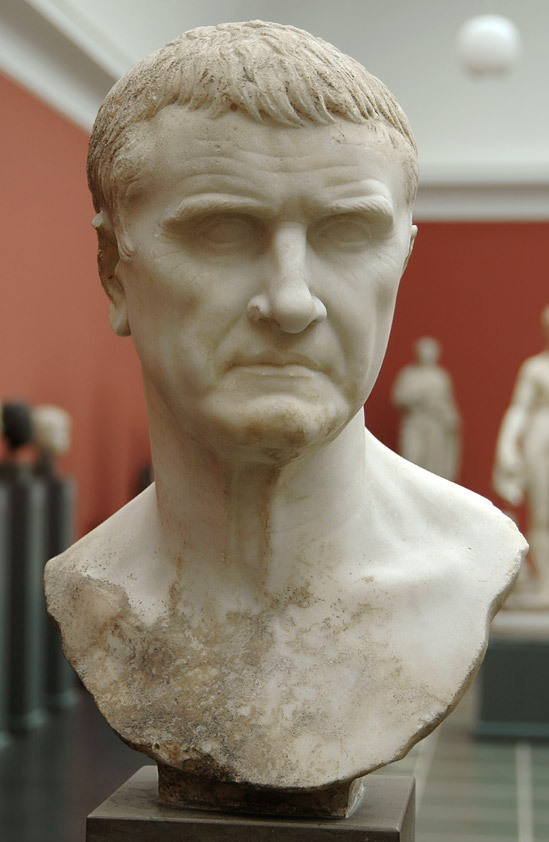
A bust identified as a portrait of Marcus Licinius Crassus, the originator of the lex Licinia de sodaliciis and a patron of Plancius

Laterensis made the prosecution a few weeks after the election of 54 BCE: the trial was held around the time of the ludi Romani, which took place in late August or early September. (Note: Lucia Galli conjectures a date in August.) The prosecution was made under the lex Licinia de sodaliciis, a law put forward by Crassus in 55. As neither the prosecution speech against Plancius nor the text of the relevant law survive, the precise accusations made against Plancius are uncertain: Laterensis may have accused Plancius of forming an illicit coalition to secure his election, of giving or receiving bribes, or of several of these offences. The Pro Plancio is itself the main source of evidence for the terms of the lex Licinia de sodaliciis. (Note: On the charges against Plancius, and the discussion of what precisely constituted the crime of which he was accused, see Stroh 2017.)

The lex Licinia specifically criminalised organised bribery through the use of associations (sodalicia) of supporters, categorising such conduct as ambitus infinitus ('aggravated ambitus'). It also specified that the jury would be selected in a manner advantageous to the prosecution: while most trials allowed both the prosecutor and defender to veto any juror they considered unsuitable, trials under the lex Licinia required the prosecutor to nominate four voting tribes from which the jurors would be chosen, from which the defence could eliminate one. Laterensis's arguments appear to have generally been more appropriate to a trial for conventional ambitus than one de sodaliciis ('concerning sodalicia'), and Cicero argued that he had only made his prosecution under the lex Licinia to benefit from its distinctive jury-selection procedure.

Plancius's case was the fourth that Cicero had defended on a charge de sodaliciis, after those of Gaius Messius and Marcus Livius Drusus Claudianus in 54 BCE and of Marcus Cispius early in 56. (Note: Lintott 2008, pp. 218–219. For the date of Claudianus's trial, see Siani-Davies 2001, p. 66.) (Note: Cicero's defence of Cispius had been at the instigation of Laterensis, his opponent in the trial of Plancius.) Taylor has characterised the prosecution as politically motivated revenge: Laterensis was an ally of Cato the Younger, who had been elected as praetor for 54 and whose ally, Lucius Domitius Ahenobarbus, had been elected consul. Catonian candidates had been defeated in the voided elections of 55, partly due to manoeuvring from the triumvirs Pompey and Caesar.

Aspects of the prosecution's speeches can be reconstructed through Cicero's responses to them in the Pro Plancio. He rebuts allegations made by Laterensis that Plancius had taken a male companion with him to Macedonia "in order to satisfy his lust", and that he had raped a female dancer. (Note: Tempest 2024, p. 192. Cicero mentions the first accusation at Pro Plancio 30, and the second at 31.) It can be inferred from Cicero's speech that Laterensis accused him of dishonesty, and of taking Plancius's case for self-interested reasons rather than out of genuine conviction. Cicero directly responds to this charge at length, and throughout the speech uses language intended to highlight his own straightforwardness and honesty, frequently contrasting the supposed urbanity and polish of the prosecutors (Laterensis was a native of the distinguished city of Tusculum), with the honest simplicity and rural unsophistication of Plancius's native Atina. Cicero also rebukes Laterensis for accusing him of faking tears to generate sympathy for Plancius. Kathryn Tempest has written that Laterensis and Cassius made a key strategy out of portraying Cicero as mendacious, and arousing the jury's anger against him; Laterensis seems to have portrayed himself, in contrast, as an honest and credible speaker able to reveal Cicero's tricks to the jury.

== Synopsis ==
Cicero edited his speeches, including the Pro Plancio, before publication, and they were subsequently affected by losses of text in the transmitted manuscripts. (Note: Steel 2013, pp. 162–1633. On the Pro Plancio specifically, see Auden 1897, p. xviii.) Andrew Lintott has suggested, following an argument presented by Jules Humbert in 1925, that the transmitted text of the speech may combine parts of multiple orations given by Cicero at different points in the trial. (Note: Part of the reason for this suggestion is that Cicero relates criticisms made by Laterensis of earlier remarks that he had made, though the defence would normally speak only once in a trial under the lex Licinia de sodaliciis. Lintott suggests that the jury may initially have been unable to reach a verdict, requiring a second hearing of evidence (ampliatio).)

Structurally, the speech divides into three unequal parts: an introductory exordium (sections 1–6a), a development of the speech's argumentation (argumentatio; sections 6b–100) and a concluding peroratio (sections 101–104). The speech largely focuses on Cicero, rather than Plancius or the charges against him. Only around a fifth deals with the charge of sodalicia directly. In respect of this, Cicero makes a twofold argument that Laterensis cannot prove the allegations of misconduct against Plancius, and that Laterensis's defeat can be easily explained without any suggestion of electoral irregularity. Cicero accepts that Plancius had made use of sodalitates (political associations), but argued that they were merely groups of friends, aimed at mutual support rather than to improperly influence the election.

In the exordium, Cicero expresses his grief that Plancius has been accused, claiming that the latter's support for him during his exile brought the case about by influencing patriotic Romans to vote for him, and bemoans the conflicting obligations he feels towards Plancius and Laterensis on account of each party's good qualities and previous support for him. The first part of the argumentatio forms a contentio dignitatis (a comparison of the two candidates' merits). Cicero contrasts Plancius and Laterensis, highlighting Plancius's relative social disadvantage by comparison with his prosecutor, but breaks the usual rhetorical convention of attacking his opponent's character, instead proclaiming his respect for and gratitude towards Laterensis, despite the insults that he says the latter deployed against him in his own speech. In sections 58–71, he contrasts the characters of Plancius, Laterensis and Cassius, Laterensis's junior partner (subscriptor), claiming that Cassius lacks both Plancius's moral uprightness and Laterensis's rhetorical skill. From section 86 onwards, Cicero reminds the jury of Plancius's service to him, and argues that to attack Plancius is therefore to attack him, and justifies his own political and personal actions to assert his own good character. As May puts it, Cicero's argument is that "support for Plancius is support for Cicero; tears shed for Plancius are tears for Cicero ... acquittal for Plancius is acquittal for Cicero".

== Analysis ==
On the charges of ambitus, Taylor judges that "the arguments are specious and the case is obviously weak". Andrew Riggsby has characterised Cicero's primary strategy as attempting to establish, separate from the precise legal matters at hand, that Plancius's conduct fitted the norms of Roman society: in Riggsby's formulation, that he was "one of us". He characterises Cicero's narrative of Plancius's life and career, as emphasising the latter's pietas, particularly towards Cicero himself. Cicero also claimed that Plancius was popular among and supported by citizens of his native Atina, which he used as evidence of Plancius's good character and upstanding status. James M. May sees the Pro Plancio as similar to the Pro Sestio, delivered by Cicero in 56 BCE, in that both speeches aim to persuade by establishing the good character (ethos) of Cicero, and by extension of his client. Cicero consistently draws parallels between himself and Plancius, and between their respective political careers, in what May calls "patron–client identification".

Craig has described Cicero's approach as a "strategy of embarrassment", similar to that which he employed in the Pro Murena of 63 BCE. Cicero claims to be embarrassed at having to oppose Laterensis, given the latter's previous friendship and support towards him. As such, he refuses to reciprocate the attacks on his integrity that Laterensis had made in his own speech. Throughout the speech, Cicero emphasises the bonds of friendship and obligation (amicitia) between himself and the prosecutor, Laterensis. Cicero had previously used this tactic extensively in three speeches, and would do so again in the Pro Ligario of 46 BCE, but it is not attested elsewhere in Roman oratory or in Greek rhetorical manuals. Craig suggests that it was an invention of Roman orators, perhaps of Cicero himself. (Note: Craig 1981, p. 31. The three previous speeches are the Pro Murena, the Pro Sulla, and the Pro Caelio.) Craig has called Cicero's response to Laterensis's attacks on his character "both ingenious and unique".

In 1882, James Smith Reid described the Pro Plancio as "a thoroughly artistic handling of a somewhat ordinary theme". (Note: Quoted in Berry 2004, p. 60.) Cicero twice uses the device of sermocinatio, an imagined dialogue with an interlocutor, following the practice of contemporary rhetoricians in using it to add interest and persuasive power to his speech. In section 59, Cicero quotes the tragedy Atreus by the early Latin playwright Lucius Accius, describing his own fatherly mentorship of his son, Cicero the Younger. Elsewhere in the speech, he makes possible allusions to two other works of early Latin literature: the Annales, a historical epic poem by Ennius, and the Satires of Gaius Lucilius. He also alludes to the Crito, a philosophical dialogue by Plato, contrasting the philosopher Socrates's absolute submission to the rule of law in that dialogue with what he alleges to be Laterensis's refusal to accept the popular verdict against his election.

== Outcome and reception ==
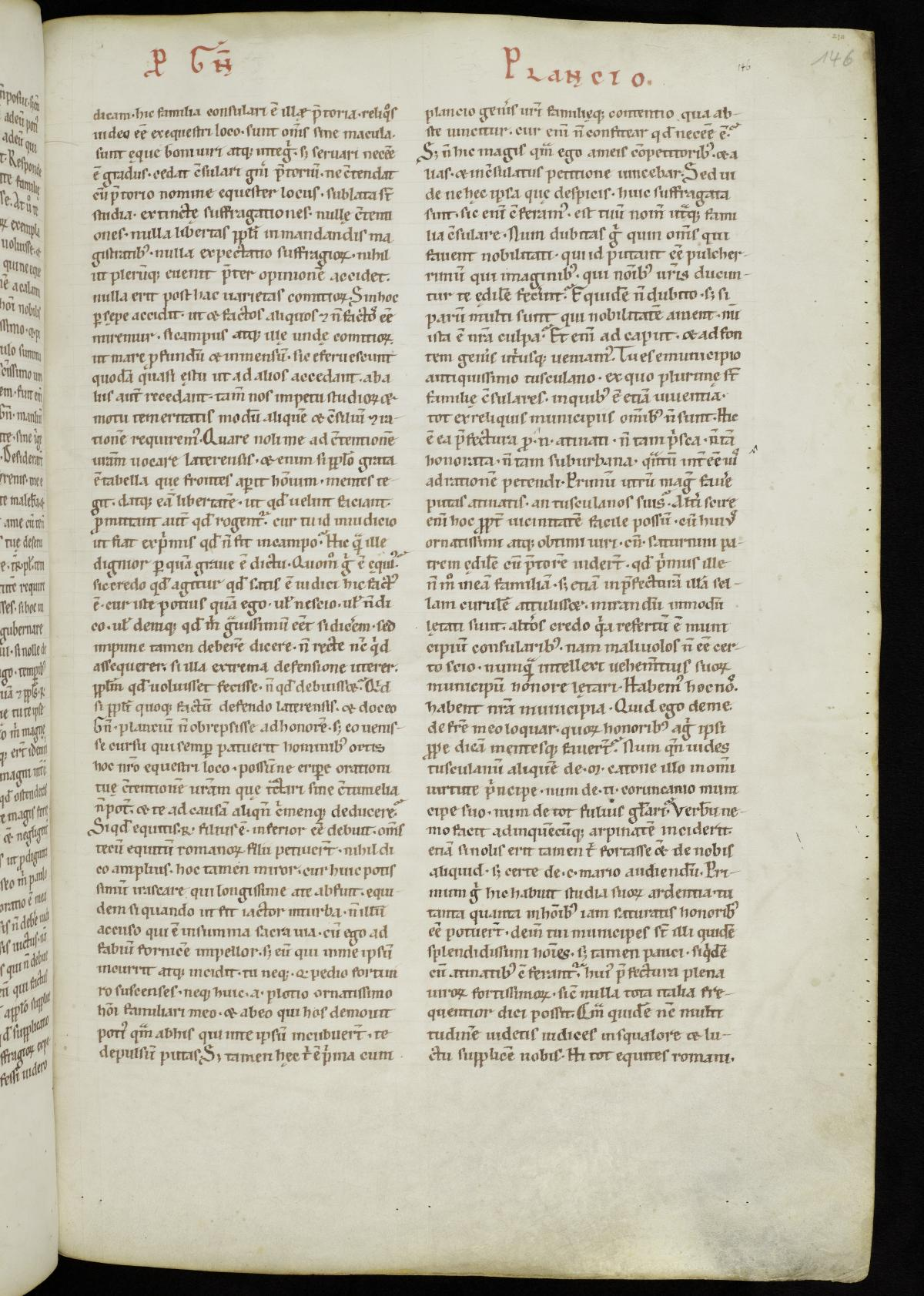
A page from the twelfth-century manuscript known as E, showing a page from the Pro Plancio

It is unknown for certain whether Plancius was acquitted or convicted, though it is often stated that Cicero's defence was successful. (Note: Auden wrote in 1897 that Plancius was acquitted, but that "there is a good deal of difference of opinion" about the matter. The argument for acquittal was put forward by Wilhelm Drumann in a work of 1834–1844, though the evidence for it was contested. Riggsby and Badian also state that Plancius was acquitted.) Cicero wrote two letters to Plancius in 46 BCE, when the latter was living on the Greek island of Corcyra; this would be consistent with a guilty verdict and the consequent punishment of exile, but Plancius may equally have been exiled for his support of Pompey by Julius Caesar after the latter's military defeat of Pompey. Cicero wrote to his brother, Quintus, on 28 September 54 BCE that he was sending him a copy of the Pro Plancio, along with the Pro Scauro, at Quintus's request. (Note: Shuckburgh 1899, pp. 291 (for the date), 295. The letter is Ad Quintum Fratrem 3.1.) In December of the same year, Cicero drew on the arguments he had made in the Pro Plancio in a letter to Publius Cornelius Lentulus Spinther, defending his collaboration with the triumvirs. (Note: Bernard 2007, p. 224. The letter is Ad familiares 1.9.)

Parts of the Pro Plancio are preserved on a fifth-century parchment fragment from Hermopolis Magna in Egypt. (Note: La Bua 2019, p. 88. The papyrus, known as P. Berol. Inv. 13229 a–b, records Pro Plancio 27–28 and 46–47.) The second-century author Aulus Gellius mentions it twice in his Attic Nights, a miscellany of notes on various scholarly topics, to illustrate Cicero's use of rhetoric and grammar. (Note: La Bua 2019, p. 92. Gellius's mentions are at Attic Nights 1.4 and 9.12.) Unlike most of the surviving speeches of Cicero, the Pro Plancio was not used or quoted in the manuals of rhetoric published during the Roman period and late antiquity. Giuseppe La Bua suggests that it may have been seen as a school-level text, and that it may have been read out of biographical interest in Cicero as well as for its perceived rhetorical quality.

Ancient critical annotations (scholia) on the Pro Plancio were preserved in the Bobbio palimpsest (Codex Ambrosianus), a late fifth-century manuscript overwritten in the seventh century with an account of the Council of Chalcedon. (Note: La Bua 2019, pp. 78–79. For the Codex Ambrosianus name, and a more detailed discussion, see Wunder 1830, p. 1.) The commentary is generally believed to have been assembled in the third or fourth century CE, possibly by a scholiast named Volcacius, (Note: Volcacius is mentioned as a scholiast on Cicero's works by Jerome, who lived from the middle of the fourth century until 420, and may himself be identical with Vulcatius Terentianus, a teacher of rhetoric mentioned in the late antique Historia Augusta.) and to be a summary of a longer commentary dating to the second century, which may itself have drawn on a first-century work. The speech was known to the fourteenth-century humanist Petrarch, and frequently attested after his death.

Around forty manuscripts containing the Pro Plancio were known by the end of the nineteenth century, though in 1897 H. W. Auden judged that all but two were "of little use in establishing the text". The older of the two manuscripts was written in the eleventh century, and is known by the siglum T after Tegernsee Abbey in Bavaria, where it was discovered. T was lost during the 1795 French invasion of Bavaria, but rediscovered in Paris by Johann Georg Baiter in 1853. (Note: Auden 1897, p. lxix. For the date, see "Charles Theodore, Elector of the Palatinate". Encyclopaedia Britannica.) The second, known as the Codex Erfurtensis (E) or Codex Thuringicus (after its previous location in Erfurt and ownership by the Thuringian Peter Suffrid), dates to the twelfth century, and collates Ciceronian texts from various sources. Both T and E probably derive their texts of the Pro Plancio from a single original, which in turn probably descends from an edition of Cicero's works made in the ninth or tenth century. T and E are generally considered the most authoritative manuscripts, though for her 1981 recension of the manuscripts of the Pro Plancio, Elżbieta Olechowska identified a total corpus of 154 manuscripts; she followed the 1911 edition of Albert Clark in considering two additional manuscripts – F, a fourteenth-century manuscript from Florence, and C^{1}, a fifteenth-century manuscript held in Cambridge – among the most useful. (Note: Olechowska 1981, p. v. Clark's edition is Clark 1911.)

== Modern editions and commentaries ==
- Angeli, Niccolò (1515). M. T. Ciceronis Orationes a Nicolao Angelio Bucinensi Nuper Maxima Diligentia Recognitae et Excusae [Marcus Tullius Cicero's Speeches, Recently Revised and Edited by Niccolò Angeli with the Greatest Care] (in Latin). Florence: Filippo Giunta. OCLC 257498566.
- Wunder, Edouard (1830). M. Tullii Ciceronis Oratio pro Cn. Plancio ad Optimorum Codicum Fidem [Marcus Tullius Cicero's Oration for Gnaeus Plancius, Faithful to the Best Manuscripts] (in Latin). Leipzig: Hartmann. OCLC 24512394.
- Köpke, Ernst (1856). Ciceros Rede für Cn. Plancius [Cicero's Speech for Gnaeus Plancius] (in Latin). Leipzig: Hartmann. OCLC 615321276.
- Auden, H. W. (1897). Cicero: Pro Plancio. London: Macmillan and Company. OCLC 1113354289.
- Clark, Albert Curtis (1911). M. Tulli Ciceronis: Orationes, Vol. 6: Pro Tullo; Pro Fonteio; Pro Sulla; Pro Archia; Pro Plancio; Pro Scauro (in Latin). Oxford: Oxford University Press. OCLC 1229813594.
- Koltz, Alfred (1916). Orationes: pro. Cn. Plancio; pro. C. Rabirio Postumo [Speeches: Pro Cn. Plancio; pro C. Rabirio Postumo]. Bibliotheca scriptorum Graecorum et Romanorum Teubneriana (in Latin). Vol. 25. Leipzig: Teubner. OCLC 1204630505 – via Internet Archive.
- Bonino, G. B. (1923) [1886]. L'Orazione di M. Tullio Cicerone in Difesa di Cn. Plancio [The Speech of Marcus Tullius Cicero in Defence of Gnaeus Plancius] (in Italian). Turin: Giovanni Chiantore. OCLC 799402530.
- Olechowska, Elżbieta M. (1981). Orationes: pro. Cn. Plancio; pro. C. Rabirio Postumo [Speeches: Pro Cn. Plancio; pro C. Rabirio Postumo]. Bibliotheca scriptorum Graecorum et Romanorum Teubneriana (in Latin). Vol. 25. Leipzig: Teubner. OCLC 299649756.

== Bibliography ==
- Alexander, Michael C. (2010) [2002]. The Case for the Prosecution in the Ciceronian Era. Ann Arbor: University of Michigan Press. ISBN 978-0-472-11261-6.
- Badian, Ernst (2012). "Plancius (RE 4), Gnaeus". In Hornblower, Simon; Spawforth, Anthony; Eidenow, Esther (eds.). The Oxford Classical Dictionary (4th ed.). Oxford University Press. ISBN 978-0-19-173525-7 – via Oxford Reference.
- Badian, Ernst (2016). "Plancius, Gnaeus". The Oxford Classical Dictionary. Oxford University Press. doi:10.1093/acrefore/9780199381135.013.5107. ISBN 978-0-19-938113-5 – via Oxford Reference.
- Basson, Willem Petrus (1980). "The Riddle of Catullus 49: Some Notes on Its Interpretation". Acta Classica. 23: 45–52. ISSN 0065-1141. JSTOR 24591605.
- Bernard, Jacques-Emmanuel (2007). "Du discours à l'épistolaire: Les échos du Pro Plancio dans la lettre de Cicéron à Lentulus Spinther (Fam. I, 9)" [From the Speech to the Epistolary: The Echoes of the Pro Plancio in the Letter of Cicero to Lentulus Spinther]. Rhetorica (in French). 25 (3): 223–242. doi:10.1353/rht.2007.0009. ISSN 0734-8584.
- Berry, Dominic H. (1989). "Guilelmius and the Erfurtenisis of Cicero: New Readings for Pro Sulla". The Classical Quarterly. 39 (2): 400–407. doi:10.1017/S0009838800037460. eISSN 1471-6844. hdl:20.500.11820/d43f9f8c-afc0-476c-a970-125bd756805d.
- Berry, Dominic H. (2004). "Introduction". Cicero: Pro P. Sulla Oratio. Cambridge Classical Texts and Commentaries. Vol. 30. Translated by Berry, Dominic H. Cambridge: Cambridge University Press. pp. 1–80. ISBN 0-521-60421-4.
- Berry, Dominic H. (2006). "Introduction". Cicero: Political Speeches. Oxford World's Classics. Translated by Berry, Dominic H. Oxford: Oxford University Press. pp. xi–xxv. ISBN 0-19-954013-6.
- Berry, Dominic H. (2020). Cicero's Catilinarians. Oxford: Oxford University Press. ISBN 978-0-19-532646-8.
- Cicero. Pro Archia. Post Reditum in Senatu. Post Reditum ad Quirites. De Domo Sua. De Haruspicum Responsis. Pro Plancio. Loeb Classical Library. Vol. 158. Translated by Watts, Nevile Hunter. Cambridge, MA: Harvard University Press. 1923. OCLC 899735659.
- Clark, Albert Curtis (1918). The Descent of Manuscripts. Oxford University Press. OCLC 32206590 – via Internet Archive.
- Cooley, Alison E.; Cooley, M. G. L. (2013) [2004]. Pompeii and Herculaneum: A Sourcebook (2nd ed.). Abingdon: Routledge. ISBN 978-1-134-62449-2.
- Craig, Christopher P. (1981). "The Accusator as Amicus: An Original Roman Tactic of Ethical Argumentation". Transactions of the American Philological Association. 111: 31–37. doi:10.2307/284116. ISSN 0360-5949. JSTOR 295261.
- Craig, Christopher P. (1990). "Cicero's Strategy of Embarrassment in the Speech for Plancius". The American Journal of Philology. 111 (1): 75–81. doi:10.2307/295261. ISSN 0002-9475. JSTOR 295261.
- Craig, Christopher P. (1993). Form as Argument in Cicero's Speeches: A Study of Dilemma. Atlanta: Scholars Press. ISBN 1-55540-879-6.
- Čulík-Baird, Hannah (2022). Cicero and the Early Latin Poets. Cambridge University Press. doi:10.1017/9781009031820. ISBN 978-1-009-03182-0.
- Deniaux, Elizabeth (1987). "De l'ambito à l'ambitus : les lieux de la propagande et de la corruption électorale à la fin de la République" [From ambitio to ambitus: Places of Propaganda and Electoral Corruption at the End of the Republic]. L'Urbs : espace urbain et histoire (Ier siècle av. J.-C. – IIIe siècle ap. J.-C.). Actes du colloque international de Rome (8–12 mai 1985) [The City: Urban Space and History (1st Century BC – 3rd Century AD). Proceedings of the International Colloquium in Rome (8–12 May 1985]. Publications of the French School at Rome (in French). Vol. 98. Rome: French School at Rome. pp. 279–304. ISBN 2-7283-0139-5.
- Englert, Walter (2010). "Cicero". In Gagarin, Michael (ed.). The Oxford Encyclopedia of Ancient Greece and Rome. Oxford University Press. ISBN 978-0-19-538839-8 – via Oxford Reference.
- Galli, Lucia (2004). "Gli Insegnamenti di un Poeta Tragico (Cic. Planc. 59)" [The Teachings of a Tragic Poet (Cic. Planc. 59)]. Studi Classici e Orientali (in Italian). 50: 245–265. ISSN 0081-6124. JSTOR 24186773.
- Grillo, Luca (2014). "A Double Sermocinatio and a Resolved Dilemma in Cicero's Pro Plancio". The Classical Quarterly. 64 (1): 214–225. doi:10.1017/S0009838813000669. eISSN 1471-6844. JSTOR 26546296.
- Harlan, Michael (1995). Roman Republican Moneyers and Their Coins, 63 B.C.–49 B.C. London: Seaby. ISBN 0-7134-7672-9.
- Kelly, Gordon P. (2009) [2006]. A History of Exile in the Roman Republic. Cambridge University Press. doi:10.1017/CBO9780511584558. ISBN 978-0-511-58455-8.
- La Bua, Giuseppe (2019). Cicero and Roman Education: The Reception of the Speeches and Ancient Scholarship. Cambridge University Press. doi:10.1017/9781107705999. ISBN 978-1-107-70599-9.
- The Letters of Cicero. Vol. 1. Translated by Shuckburgh, Evelyn S. London: George Bell and Sons. 1899. OCLC 15608885 – via Internet Archive.
- Lintott, Andrew (2008). Cicero as Evidence: A Historian's Companion. Oxford University Press. doi:10.1093/acprof:oso/9780199216444.001.0001. ISBN 978-0-19-171218-0.
- Lomas, Kathryn (2004). "A Volscian Mafia? Cicero and his Italian Clients in the Forensic Speeches". In Powell, Jonathan; Paterson, Jeremy (eds.). Cicero the Advocate. Oxford University Press. pp. 99–116. ISBN 0-19-815280-9.
- Maffei, Fernande (2023). "Cicero in Egypt: The Ciceronian Papyri and the Teaching of Latin in the East". In Pieper, Christoph; Pausch, Dennis (eds.). The Scholia on Cicero's Speeches: Contexts and Perspectives. Mnemosyne Supplements. Vol. 476. Leiden: Brill. pp. 69–86. ISBN 978-90-04-51644-1.
- May, James M. (1988). Trials of Character: The Eloquence of Ciceronian Ethos. Chapel Hill: University of North Carolina Press. ISBN 0-8078-1759-7.
- Reeve, Michael D. (2013). "A Jumbled Manuscript of Cicero's Speeches: Madrid Bibl. Nac. 10119". Exemplaria Classica. 17: 45–61. doi:10.33776/ec.v17i0.2334. ISSN 2173-6839 – via ResearchGate.
- Riesenweber, Thomas (2023). "Ciceros Reden bei den Rhetores Latini Minores" [Cicero's Speeches in the Rhetores Latini Minores]. In Pieper, Christoph; Pausch, Dennis (eds.). The Scholia on Cicero's Speeches: Contexts and Perspectives. Mnemosyne Supplements (in German). Vol. 476. Leiden: Brill. pp. 87–128. ISBN 978-90-04-51644-1.
- Riggsby, Andrew (2010). Crime and Community in Ciceronian Rome. Austin: University of Texas Press. ISBN 978-0-292-78545-8.
- Schneider, Maridien (2010). "Crassus". In Gagarin, Michael (ed.). The Oxford Encyclopedia of Ancient Greece and Rome. Oxford University Press. pp. 317–318. doi:10.1093/acref/9780195170726.001.0001. ISBN 978-0-19-517072-6.
- Siani-Davies, Mary (2001). "Introduction". Cicero's Speech Pro Rabirio Postumo. Translated by Siani-Davies, Mary. Oxford University Press. pp. 1–92. ISBN 978-0-19-924096-8.
- Sigismund-Nielsen, Hanne (2010). "Clubs and Associations, Roman". In Gagarin, Michael (ed.). The Oxford Encyclopedia of Ancient Greece and Rome. Oxford University Press. ISBN 978-0-19-538839-8 – via Oxford Reference.
- Steel, Catherine (2013). "Cicero, Oratory and Public Life". In Steel, Catherine (ed.). The Cambridge Companion to Cicero. Cambridge University Press. pp. 160–170. doi:10.1017/CCO9781139048750. ISBN 978-1-139-04875-0.
- Stroh, Wilfried (2017). "Die Lex Licinia de sodaliciis im Lichte von Ciceros Rede Pro Plancio: eine Studie zum Phantom der römischen Wahlvereine" [The Lex Licinia de sodaliciis in the Light of Cicero's Speech Pro Plancio: A Study on the Phantom of Roman Electoral Unions]. In Babusiaux, Ulrike; Nobel, Peter; Platschek, Johannes (eds.). Der Bürge Einst und Jetzt: Festschrift für Alfons Bürge [Bürge Then and Now: Festschrift for Alfons Bürge] (in German). Zurich: Schulthess. pp. 361–418. OCLC 1038708098.
- Taylor, Lily Ross (1968) [1964]. "Magistrates of 55 BC in Cicero's Pro Plancio and Catullus 52". Athenaeum. 42: 12–28. ISSN 0004-6574.
- Tempest, Kathryn (2024). "Cicero under Attack: Deception and Emotions in the Trial of Plancius". In Geitner, Philipp; Pausch, Dennis; Schwameis, Christoph; Wierzcholowski, Rainer (eds.). Ciceronian Invectives. Emotions in Antiquity. Vol. 5. Tübingen: Mohr Siebeck. pp. 181–204. doi:10.1628/978-3-16-162285-4. ISBN 978-3-16-161035-6.
- Vasaly, Ann (2013). "The Political Impact of Cicero's Speeches". In Steel, Catherine (ed.). The Cambridge Companion to Cicero. Cambridge University Press. pp. 141–159. doi:10.1017/CCO9781139048750. ISBN 978-1-139-04875-0.
