= Lucius Cassius Longinus (proconsul 48 BC) =

Roman general and politician

Lucius Cassius Longinus was the brother of Gaius Cassius Longinus, a leading instigator in the assassination of Julius Caesar.

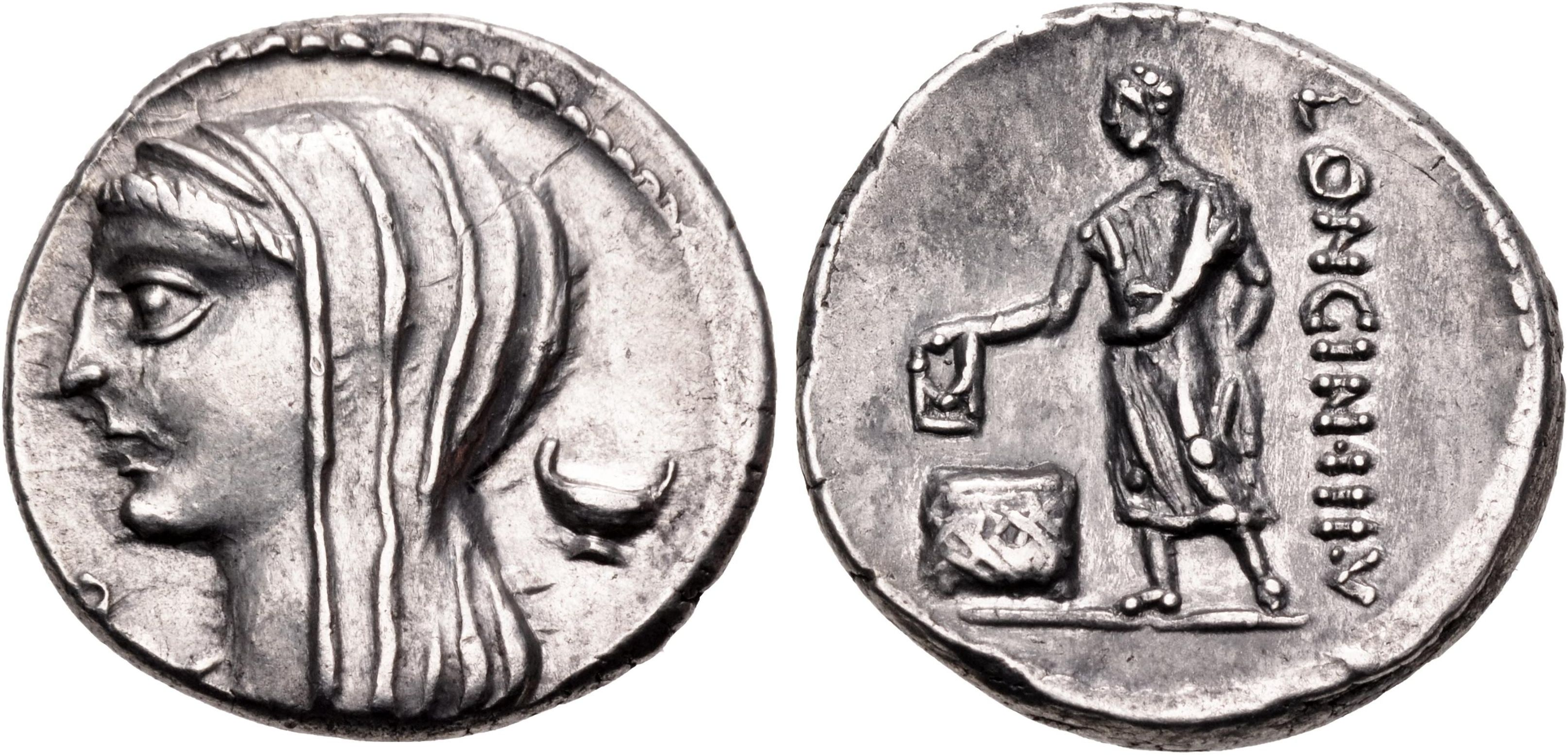
Denarius minted by Lucius Longinus in 63 BC, depicting Vesta on the obverse and a Roman citizen voting on the reverse. Both faces allude to the trial of the vestal virgins of 114–113 BC.

Around 52 BC, Lucius Longinus was triumvir monetalis in 63 BC. He minted denarii referring to the famous trial of the vestal virgins of 114–113 BC, which was prosecuted by his ancestor Lucius Cassius Longinus Ravilla. In 54 BC, he was the junior co-prosecutor (subscriptor) to Marcus Iuventius Laterensis in the trial of Gnaeus Plancius for electoral malpractice (ambitus). Plancius was defenced by Cicero, who accused Longinus of incompetence, immorality and inexperience in his defence speech, the Pro Plancio.

Longinus was made a proconsul by Caesar's appointment in 48 BC, during the civil war. He occupied Thessaly, but was forced by Metellus Scipio to retreat, after which he joined Calvisius Sabinus in Aetolia. He was a tribune of the plebs in 44 BC, a year in which the people's tribunes were exceptionally numerous and his brother held the praetorship. Along with his fellow tribunes Tiberius Canutius and Decimus Carfulenus, L. Cassius was excluded from the important meeting of the Roman Senate held November 28 to reassign several provinces for the following year. A bill enabling Caesar to add new families to the patriciate was probably sponsored by him rather than his brother as praetor.

== Bibliography ==
- Michael Crawford, Roman Republican Coinage, Cambridge University Press, 1974.
