= Carfulena gens =

Plebeian family at Rome

The gens Carfulena was an obscure plebeian family at ancient Rome toward the end of the Republic and under the early empire. The only member of this gens mentioned by Roman writers is Decimus Carfulenus, who served under Caesar during the Alexandrine War; a few other Carfuleni are known from inscriptions.

== Origin ==
The nomen Carfulenus belongs to a class of gentilicia typically derived from other nomina, or occasionally place-names, with stems ending in -i, where the derivative suffix -enus substitutes for the more usual -inus.

== Branches and cognomina ==
Three of the Carfuleni known from epigraphy are mentioned in the same inscription from Aquileia in Venetia and Histria, though it is unknown whether they were born or lived there. The only cognomen borne by any of them is Modestus, meaning "moderate", a common type of surname derived from the character of an individual.

== Members ==
This list includes abbreviated praenomina. For an explanation of this practice, see filiation.

- Decimus Carfulenus, (Note: Appian calls him Carsuleius.) who served under Caesar in 47 BC, during the Alexandrine War, was tribune of the plebs in 44, the year of Caesar's assassination, and subsequently perished in the Battle of Mutina, in 43.
- Publius Carfulenus, the former master of the merchant Publius Carfulenus Modestus.
- Publius Carfulenus P. l. Modestus, a freedman and negotiator, or merchant, mentioned in an inscription from Aquileia, dating from the reigns of Augustus or Tiberius.
- Publius Carfulenus Princeps l., a freedman of Augustus or Tiberius, mentioned together with Publius Carfulenus Modestus in an inscription from Aquileia.

== See also ==
- List of Roman gentes

== Bibliography ==
- Aulus Hirtius, De Bello Alexandrino.
- Marcus Tullius Cicero, Epistulae ad Familiares, Philippicae.
- Appianus Alexandrinus (Appian), Bellum Civile (The Civil War).
- Dictionary of Greek and Roman Biography and Mythology, William Smith, ed., Little, Brown and Company, Boston (1849).
- René Cagnat et alii, L'Année épigraphique (The Year in Epigraphy, abbreviated "AE"), Presses Universitaires de France (1888–present).
- August Pauly, Georg Wissowa, et alii, Realencyclopädie der Classischen Altertumswissenschaft (Scientific Encyclopedia of the Knowledge of Classical Antiquities, abbreviated RE or PW), J. B. Metzler, Stuttgart (1894–1980).
- George Davis Chase, "The Origin of Roman Praenomina", in Harvard Studies in Classical Philology, vol. VIII, pp. 103–184 (1897).
- T. Robert S. Broughton, The Magistrates of the Roman Republic, American Philological Association (1952–1986).
- D.P. Simpson, Cassell's Latin and English Dictionary, Macmillan Publishing Company, New York (1963).
