= Marcus Antonius Creticus =

1st-century BC Roman politician

- Died: 72 or 71 BC; Crete
- Spouses: Numitoria; Julia
- Children: Antonia; Mark Antony; Gaius Antonius; Lucius Antonius
- Father: Marcus Antonius

Marcus Antonius Creticus (fl. 74–72 BC), was a Roman politician during the late Roman Republic. He is best known for his failed pirate-hunting career and for being the father of the general Mark Antony.

== Biography ==
=== Early life ===
A member of the plebeian gens Antonia, Creticus was the son of the famed orator Marcus Antonius. He had a sister named Antonia and a younger brother named Gaius Antonius Hybrida.

=== Career ===
In 74 BC, Creticus was elected praetor and was given unusually broad powers to deal with piracy in the Mediterranean Sea and assist the ongoing operations against King Mithridates VI of Pontus. These powers paralleled those given to Pompey in 67 BC and his father in 102 BC. Creticus not only failed in the task, but plundered the very provinces he was supposed to protect from robbery. He attacked the Cretans, who had made an alliance with the pirates, but was totally defeated, most of his ships being sunk. Diodorus Siculus states that he only saved himself by a disgraceful treaty. As a result of this defeat he was mockingly given the cognomen Creticus, which means "conqueror of Crete", and also "man made of chalk", when translated from Latin. He died soon afterwards (72 or 71 BC) in Crete. Most authorities are agreed as to his avarice and incompetence, but the biographer Plutarch describes him as a friendly, honest and generous man.

== Family ==
Antonius is said by Cicero to have been married to a woman named Numitoria, a daughter of Quintus Numitorius Pullus, although historian Jeffery Tatum argues that this is likely to invective. Antonius married Julia with whom he had three sons: Marcus Antonius (the triumvir), Gaius Antonius and Lucius Antonius, as well as a daughter named Antonia, who married Publius Vatinius.
