= Canutia gens =

Plebeian family at Rome

The gens Canutia or Cannutia was a plebeian family at Rome. The gens appears toward the end of the Republic, and is best known from two individuals, the orator Publius Canutius, and Tiberius Canutius, tribune of the plebs in 44 BC, the year of Caesar's assassination. A Gaius Canutius mentioned by Suetonius is probably the same person as Tiberius; the reference to Canutius in Tacitus' Dialogus de Oratoribus may refer to either Publius or Tiberius, or perhaps to a different person altogether.

== See also ==
- List of Roman gentes
