= Decimus Carfulenus =

Tribune of the plebs (died 44 BC)

Decimus Carfulenus, called Carsuleius by Appianus (died 21 April 43 BC) was a Roman statesman from the time of the Civil War to the Battle of Mutina, in which he perished.

== Biography ==
Carfulenus served under Caesar in the Alexandrine War in 47 BC. Hirtius describes him as a man of great military skill.

At the time of Caesar's murder in 44 BC, Carfulenus was tribune of the plebs. He was a supporter of the aristocratic party, and an opponent of Marcus Antonius, the general of Caesar. When Antonius summoned the senate to the Capitol on November 28, in order to have Caesar's nephew, Octavianus, declared an enemy of the state, Carfulenus and his colleagues, Tiberius Canutius and Lucius Cassius Longinus, were excluded from the Capitol, so that they could not interpose their veto against the senate's decree.

In the following year, Carfulenus took an active part in the war against Antonius. He fell in the Battle of Mutina, in which Antonius was defeated.

== See also ==
- Carfulena gens
