= Quintus Salvius Salvidienus Rufus =

1st Century BC Roman politician and general

Quintus Salvius Salvidienus Rufus (c. 65 BC – 40 BC) was a Roman general and one of the principal generals and advisors of Octavian during the early years of his political activity.

== Biography ==
=== Early life ===
Despite his humble origin, he was one of Octavian's best friends, along with Marcus Agrippa. Cassius Dio mentions that he had a brother.

=== Career ===
Salvidienus and Agrippa were with Octavian at Apollonia in March 44 BC when Julius Caesar was assassinated in Rome. Salvidienus became one of the most trusted of Octavian's generals during the civil wars following Caesar's death. In 42 BC, he commanded the fleet of Octavian against Sextus Pompeius, who had taken control of Sicily and was harassing the coasts of Italy. However, Salvidienus was defeated in a naval battle fought off Rhegium, largely because of the inexperience of his crews.

On Octavian's return from Greece after the Battle of Philippi, Salvidienus was sent to Spain with six legions, but he hastily retreated to Italy to oppose Lucius Antonius and Fulvia (Antony's wife), who had taken up arms against Octavian, starting the so-called Perusine War. Salvidienus captured and destroyed the city of Sentinum and then, with Agrippa, surrounded Lucius Antonius's forces in Perusia. The other Antonian generals, who had no clear orders from Mark Antony, remained out of the struggle, and Lucius Antonius was forced to surrender after a few months' siege (winter of 40 BC). After the end of the Perusian War, Octavian sent Salvidienus to Gaul as a governor, with a large army of eleven legions. He was also designated as consul for 39 BC, although he had not reached senatorial rank.

=== Downfall ===
Despite all these honours, when Antony came from the East with large forces to confront Octavian, Salvidienus offered to desert to Antony with his legions. Apparently this proposal came after Antony had already made an agreement with Octavian (the Pact of Brundisium). Antony revealed to Octavian the treachery of Salvidienus, who was accused of high treason in the Senate and condemned to death in the fall of 40 BC. He was either executed or committed suicide, as reported by Appian, Livy, and Dio.

== Personal life ==
A woman attested in inscriptions as Salvidiena Q. f. Rufa is believed to have been his daughter.

== Cultural depictions ==
16th-century French scholar Denis Lambin proposed that the figure of Nasidienus Rufus ("big red nose") in the poetry of Roman writer Horace is a "thinly veiled" parody of Salvidienus.

Salvidienus is a point of view character in John Williams' epistolary novel Augustus. In the novel his betrayal of Octavian and downfall occur earlier in the timeline of events, instead of following the battle of Philippi, Antony reveals to Octavian Salvidienus' treachery during the meeting where the Second Triumvirate was agreed upon, not long after the battle of Mutina in 43 BC.
