= Trial of the Vestal Virgins (114–113 BC) =

2nd century BC Roman Vestal Virgins prosecuted for breaking their vow of chastity

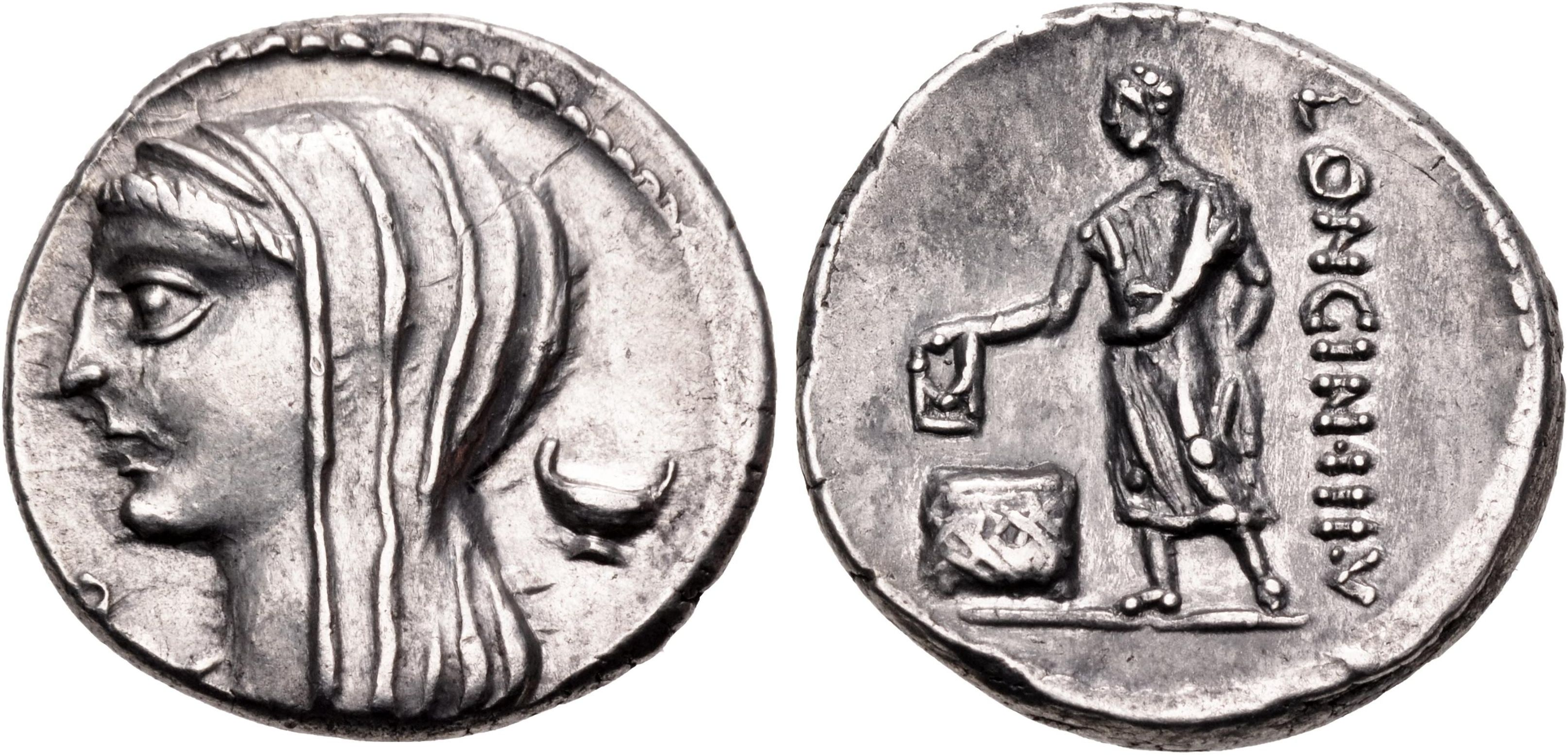
Denarius of Lucius Cassius Longinus, 63 BC. The obverse depicts Vesta. On the reverse, a voter is casting a ballot inscribed V, for uti rogas ("as you propose"). Vesta and the voter are allusions to the election of Longinus Ravilla as prosecutor in the Vestals' case of 113.

Aemilia, Licinia and Marcia were Roman Vestal Virgins who were prosecuted in two famous trials between 115 and 113 BC for having broken the vow of chastity. The first trial was conducted by the Pontifex Maximus Metellus Delmaticus, who sentenced Aemilia to death in 114 BC. The decision to spare the other two Vestals triggered outrage and led to a follow-up trial headed by Cassius Longinus Ravilla. Licinia and Marcia were subsequently put to death as well. The trials were heavily influenced by the political background and network of the participants.

== The individuals ==
Aemilia was a member of the patrician gens Aemilia. Licinia was a member of the plebeian gens Licinia and the daughter of Gaius Licinius Crassus. In 123, her dedication of an altar was cancelled by the pontiffs because it had been made without the approval of the people. Marcia was a member of the plebeian gens Marcia and possibly the daughter of Quintus Marcius Rex, praetor in 144 BC.

== The trials ==
In 114 BC, a Roman woman was killed by a lightning strike which left her naked body exposed. This was interpreted as an omen indicating that a Vestal Virgin had broken her oath of chastity. In December 114, three Vestals – Aemilia, Marcia and Licinia – were accused of and tried for incestum. Reportedly, Aemilia had initially been seduced by Lucius Veturius. After this, she arranged for Marcia and Licinia to have sexual relations with Lucius Veturius' male friends. Aemilia and Licinia had multiple lovers, while Marcia had a monogamous relationship. The three Vestals were prosecuted after being reported to the authorities by their slave Manius, who had helped in exchange for manumission he never received. According to Manius, the affairs of the Vestals was widely tolerated within the Roman aristocracy. The trial was a great scandal in contemporary Rome. Aemilia was found guilty and sentenced to death by the Pontifex Maximus Lucius Caecilius Metellus Dalmaticus. Licinia and Marcia were both acquitted.

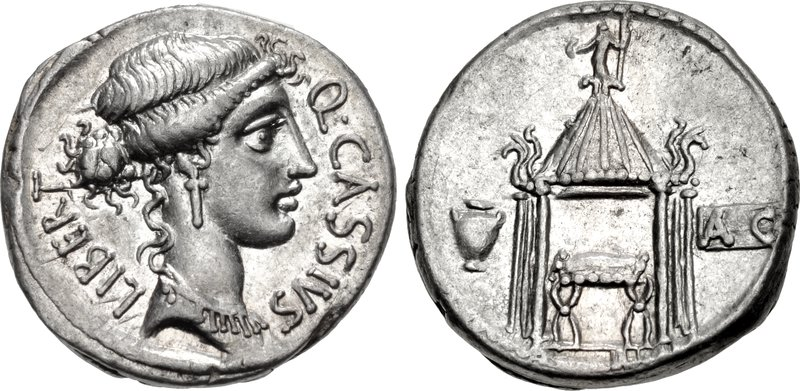
Denarius of Quintus Cassius Longinus, 55 BC. Libertas is portrayed on the obverse. The reverse is a depiction of the Temple of Vesta, where Longinus Ravilla held the trial in 113. On the left is a voting urn, and a ballot (tabella) is on the right. It is inscribed A C for Absolvo Condemno ("acquitted" or "condemned"), a further reference to the trial.

The acquittal of Marcia and Licinia created public outrage in Rome because of Manius' testimony that the sexual crimes of the Vestals had been an open secret and tolerated among the aristocracy, and the public interpreted the outcome as a case of corruption among the elite. The case against Licinia and Marcia was therefore reopened the following year by the tribune Sextus Peducaeus, who took the unusual step of transferring the case from the pontiff to Lucius Cassius Longinus Ravilla, who was known for his severity. Licinia was defended by the orator Lucius Licinius Crassus.

The second trial ended in a guilty verdict for both Licinia and Marcia who were both sentenced to be executed by being buried alive. During the trial, several men were implicated as the alleged lovers of the Vestals and prosecuted. This involved several prominent people and the process has been interpreted by some as political. Among those men implicated were the orator Marcus Antonius, who was acquitted. The charge of incestum against the former consul Servius Fulvius Flaccus may also have been connected to this case.

After the trial, several rituals were conducted to clean the holy fire of Vesta from the pollution which was believed to have soiled it because of the crimes. Upon consultation with the Sibylline books, a new temple to Venus Verticordia was constructed, and a rare instance of human sacrifice was carried out, in this case two couples, one Greek and one Gallic, were buried alive in the Forum Boarium.

== Bibliography ==
- T. Robert S. Broughton, The Magistrates of the Roman Republic, American Philological Association, 1952–1986.
- Michael Crawford, Roman Republican Coinage, Cambridge University Press, 1974.
