= Gaius Antonius (brother of Mark Antony) =

1st-century BCE Roman general and politician

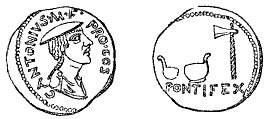
This coin, minted by Gaius Antonius as proconsul, depicts on the obverse a personification of Macedonia wearing a felt hat. The reverse depicts pontifical equipment. It does not depict Antonius.

Gaius Antonius (82 – 42 BC) was the second son of Marcus Antonius Creticus and Julia, and thus, younger brother of the Triumvir Mark Antony.

== Life ==
=== Early life ===
Like both of his brothers, Gaius started his life free from paternal guidance, in the midst of scandals, parties and gambling.

=== Civil war ===
During Caesar's civil war, Gaius was a legate of Julius Caesar in 49 BC and was entrusted with the defense of Illyria against Pompeians and with the campaign to regain cities already taken by rebels and the Pompeians. Gaius was entrusted with the newly recruited 24th legion and half of the new 28th legion. On the way to Illyria, Antonius was intercepted by a Pompeian fleet. Led by centurion Titus Pullo, the men refused to fight, and turned traitors. They were then reported to be fighting at the Battle of Dyrrachium.

=== Caesar's dictatorship ===
With all the members of the Antonius family, he was then promoted to high offices of the cursus honorum. In 44 BC, Gaius was an urban praetor, while his brothers Mark Antony and Lucius Antonius were consul and tribune, respectively.

=== Caesar's assassination and afterward ===
After the assassination of Caesar, Gaius (as a Caesarean) was appointed governor of the Roman province of Macedonia. Marcus Junius Brutus and the other assassins, however, chose Macedonia as refuge from Octavian and - following opposition from Gaius - dispossessed him of his governorship. Brutus at first seemed to treat him generously but, on finding that he was attempting to persuade his troops to mutiny and with the recent murder of Cicero ordered by his brother, Brutus ultimately ordered his death.

== Sources ==
- Plutarch, Brutus, 28
- Dio Cassius xlvii. 21-24
- Sumner, G.V. (1971). "The Lex Annalis under Caesar (Continued)". Phoenix. 25 (4): 357–371. doi:10.2307/1088064. JSTOR 1088064.
