= Perusine War =

1st-century BC civil war in the Roman Republic

- Part of the Crisis of the Roman Republic
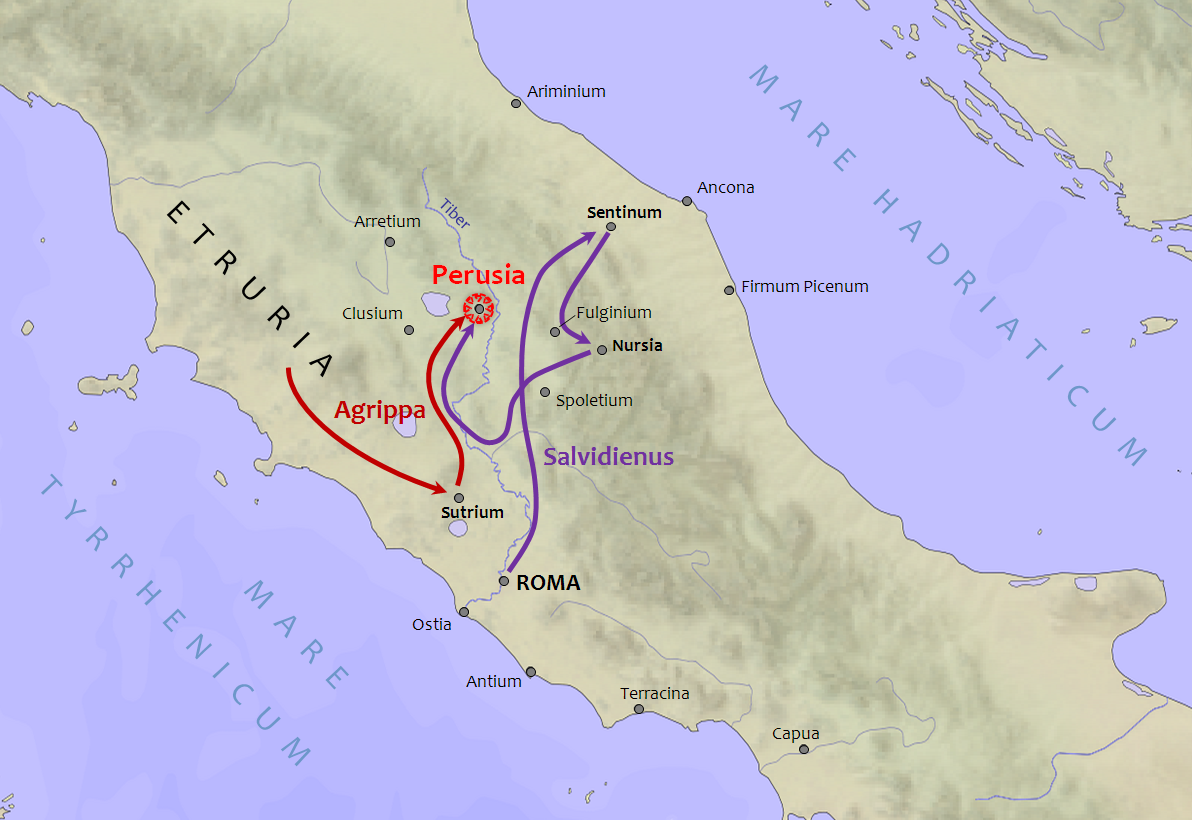
Date	41–40 BC
Location	Rome, Perusia
Result	Victory for Octavian, renewed alliance between Octavian and Antony
Territorial changes	Octavian briefly loses, then regains, control of Rome

Belligerents
Roman forces of Octavian	Roman forces of Lucius Antonius

Commanders and leaders
Octavian; Agrippa; Salvidienus	Lucius Antonius; Plancus; Ventidius; Asinius

Strength
65,000	43,000 (8 Legions)

The Perusine War (also Perusian or Perusinian War, or the War of Perusia) was a civil war of the Roman Republic, which lasted from 41 to 40 BC. It was fought by Lucius Antonius (the younger brother of Mark Antony) and the Umbrians of Perusia in support of Mark Antony against his political enemy Octavian (the future Emperor Augustus).

Fulvia felt strongly that her husband should be the sole ruler of Rome instead of sharing power in the Second Triumvirate, especially with Octavian. Her prominence in the ensuing conflict was unusual for Roman society, where women were excluded from power and their political contributions rarely documented.

Fulvia’s brother-in-law, Lucius Antonius, raised eight legions in Italy. The army held Rome for a brief time, but was then forced to retreat to the city of Perusia (modern Perugia, Italy). The Umbrians were sympathetic since some of their towns and surrounding land had been confiscated by Octavian for colonisation by his veterans after the defeat of Brutus and Cassius at Philippi in 42 BC.

During the winter of 41–40 BC, Octavian's army laid siege to the city, finally causing it to surrender due to starvation when the besieged realized reinforcements from Italy or the East were not coming. The lives of Fulvia and Lucius Antonius were spared, and Antonius was sent to govern a Spanish province as a gesture to his brother. Antony exiled Fulvia to Sicyon, where she died of an unknown illness in 40 BC. She was declared posthumously to have been the sole cause of dispute between Antony and Octavian, whose repaired alliance was symbolized by Antony's new marriage to Octavian's sister Octavia. This arrangement collapsed eight years later, and Antony and Octavian resumed their civil war.

== Aftermath - Arae Perusinae ("Altars of Perusia") ==
While Octavian pardoned the soldiery and mass inhabitants, many others were marked for execution. According to Suetonius, "300 members of the two orders (Senators and Knights), chosen from those who had surrendered, were slaughtered as sacrificial victims before an altar erected to Caesar on the Ides of March." a number that was also corroborated by Cassius Dio, "they did not merely suffer death in an ordinary form, but were led to the altar consecrated to the former Caesar and were there sacrificed — three hundred knights and many senators, among them Tiberius Cannutius".
