= Albert Curtis Clark =

British classical scholar (1859–1937)

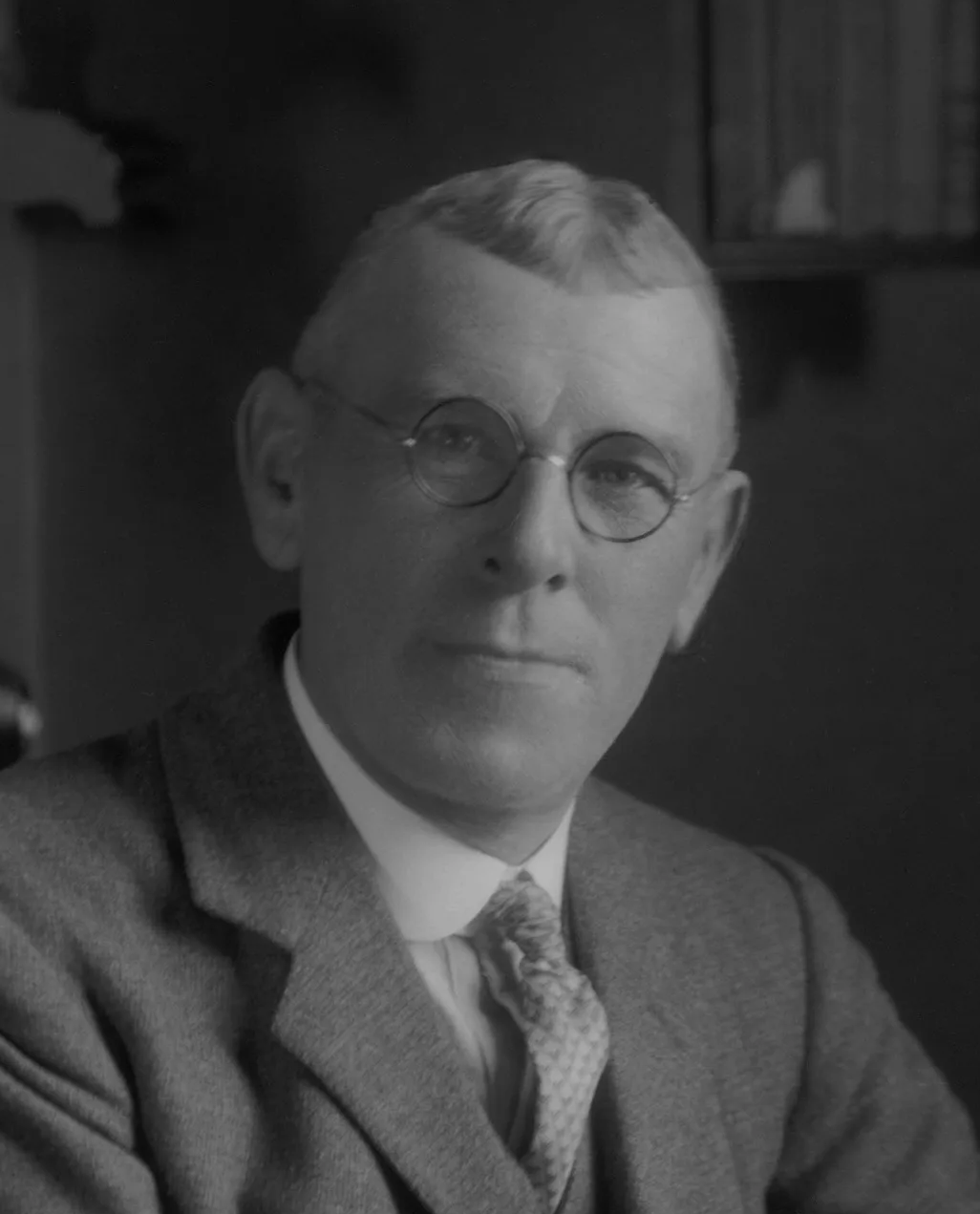
Clark in 1928

Albert Curtis Clark, FBA (21 February 1859 – 5 February 1937) was an English classical scholar, who specialised in Latin literature, Cicero, and the New Testament. From 1913 to 1934, he was Corpus Christi Professor of Latin at the University of Oxford. He was also President of the Classical Association from 1930 to 1931.

== Works ==
- Albert Curtis Clark, Albert Curtis (1914). The Primitive Text of the Gospels and Acts. Oxford: Clarendon Press. OCLC 2487293.
- ——— (1918). The Descent of Manuscripts. Oxford: Clarendon Press. OCLC 1946904.
- ——— (1933). The Acts of the Apostles, a critical edition, with introduction and notes on selected passages. Oxford: Clarendon Press. OCLC 3943913.
