= Publius Canutius =

Publius Canutius or Cannutius was described by Cicero as the most eloquent orator of the senatorial order.

Canutius was born in 106 B.C., the same year as Cicero. After the death of Publius Sulpicius Rufus, who was one of the most celebrated orators of his time, and who left no orations behind him, Canutius composed some and published them under the name of Sulpicius.

Canutius is frequently mentioned in Cicero's oration for Aulus Cluentius Habitus, as having been engaged in the prosecution of several of the parties connected with that disgraceful affair.

== See also ==
- Canutia (gens)
