= Lucius Antonius (brother of Mark Antony) =

1st-century BC Roman consul

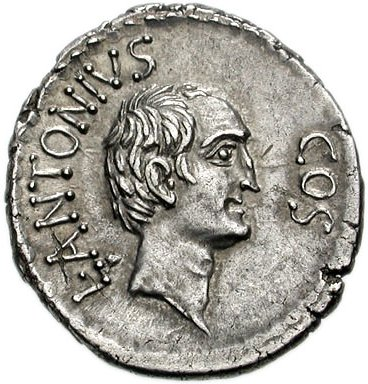
- Coin from 41 BC
- Born: c. 78 BC
- Other name: Pietas
- Office: Plebeian tribune (44 BC); Consul (40 BC)
- Parents: Marcus Antonius Creticus (father); Julia (mother)

Lucius Antonius (fl. c. 50 – 41 BC) was a Roman republican politician. He was the younger brother of Mark Antony (known in Latin as Marcus Antonius). Lucius first appears as a quaestor in Asia in 50 BC and served under the Pompeian-aligned governor of the province through 49. He next appears as plebeian tribune in 44 BC, the year Julius Caesar was assassinated and his brother Marcus was consul.

He then held the consulship under the triumvirate in 41 BC during which he fought a short war against the triumvir Octavian, ostensibly to end the triumvirate and its mass seizures of lands from Italian towns. Defeated early the next year, he was then sent to govern Spain as proconsul; nothing concrete is then recorded about him.

== Biography ==
=== Early life ===
Lucius was a son of Marcus Antonius Creticus and Julia, a third cousin of Julius Caesar. He was also grandson of the rhetorician Marcus Antonius Orator executed by Gaius Marius' supporters in 86 BC. Together with his older brothers Mark Antony and Gaius Antonius, he spent his early years roaming through Rome in bad company. Plutarch refers to the untamed life of the youths and their friends, frequenting gambling houses and drinking too much.

=== Career ===
He is first recorded as holding the quaestorship in 50 BC, where he was assigned by lot to Quintus Minucius Thermus as governor of provincial Asia. Probably early the next year, when Thermus left the province, he was left in charge of the province as pro quaestore pro praetore; with the arrival of Gaius Fannius as propraetorian governor, he likely continued in the role of quaestor. Lucius likely had Caesarian sympathies and quarrelled with Fannius, his superior, who supported Pompey during the civil war.

He is next recorded as plebeian tribune in 44 BC, the year in which his brother Marcus was consul and in which Caesar was assassinated. Prior to Caesar's death, he carried a law which authorised Caesar to appoint half the non-consular magistrates without elections. After the Ides, in June, he was appointed along with his brother Marcus to a commission to distribute land as rewards to veterans of the civil war. The law was, however, suspended in January 43 BC in the run-up to the war between his brother Marcus and the senate. During that war, Lucius supported his brother and commanded Antony's forces besieging Mutina while his brother fought the Battle of Forum Gallorum. His efforts in the war are documented by Cicero's anti-Antonian Philippics, where he is attacked for mistreating the city of Parma.

The war of Mutina ended after both consuls were killed in battle. Octavian seized the consulship for himself and negotiated a settlement among the Caesarians to establish a triumvirate made up of Lucius' brother Marcus, Octavian, and Lepidus.

He entered the consulship of 41 BC with celebration of a triumph ex Alpibus. With the support of his sister-in-law Fulvia, his brother Marcus' wife, he quarrelled with triumvir Octavian over triumviral land policy, criticising Octavian's seizure of lands from Italian cities to hand out to veterans. During this political campaign against Octavian, he adopted the cognomen Pietas and – attempting to harness the widespread rioting and unrest against Octavian's seizures – urged violent resistance. While the soldiers and the senate urged mediation between the two leaders, war started that summer, with Lucius asserting his right as consul to lead the republic and defend against Octavian's deprivations against the Italians.

The short conflict, called the Perusine War, started with Lucius taking Rome with a small army before turning north to link to allied forces in Etruria. By the autumn, however, he was shut in to the town of Perusia by Octavian's generals Marcus Vipsanius Agrippa and Quintus Salvius Salvidienus Rufus. While Lucius led no more than eight legions, some thirteen legions under the command of allies of his brother Marcus stood by impassively while Octavian's forces continued the siege. He surrendered the city in early 40 BC, which was brutally sacked into a ruin, while he and his soldiers were spared. Fulvia was also allowed to flee to Athens. He was then sent later in the year as one of the governors in Spain, where he died.

== See also ==
- Pietas
- Perusine War

== Sources ==
- Badian, Ernst (2012). "Antonius (Pietas), Lucius". Oxford Classical Dictionary. doi:10.1093/acrefore/9780199381135.013.556.
- Broughton, Thomas Robert Shannon (1952). The magistrates of the Roman republic. Vol. 2. New York: American Philological Association.
- Pelling, C (1996). "The triumviral period". In Bowman, Alan K; Champlin, Edward; Lintott, Andrew (eds.). The Augustan empire, 43 BC–AD 69. Cambridge Ancient History. Vol. 10 (2nd ed.). Cambridge University Press. pp. 1–69. ISBN 0-521-26430-8.
- Zmeskal, Klaus (2009). Adfinitas (in German). Vol. 1. Passau: Verlag Karl Stutz. ISBN 978-3-88849-304-1.

Political offices
Preceded by Marcus Lepidus and Lucius Munatius Plancus	Consul of the Roman Republic with Publius Servilius Vatia Isauricus; 41 BC	Succeeded by Gaius Asinius Pollio and Gnaeus Domitius Calvinus
