= Perusia =

Archaeological site in Italy

- Perugia
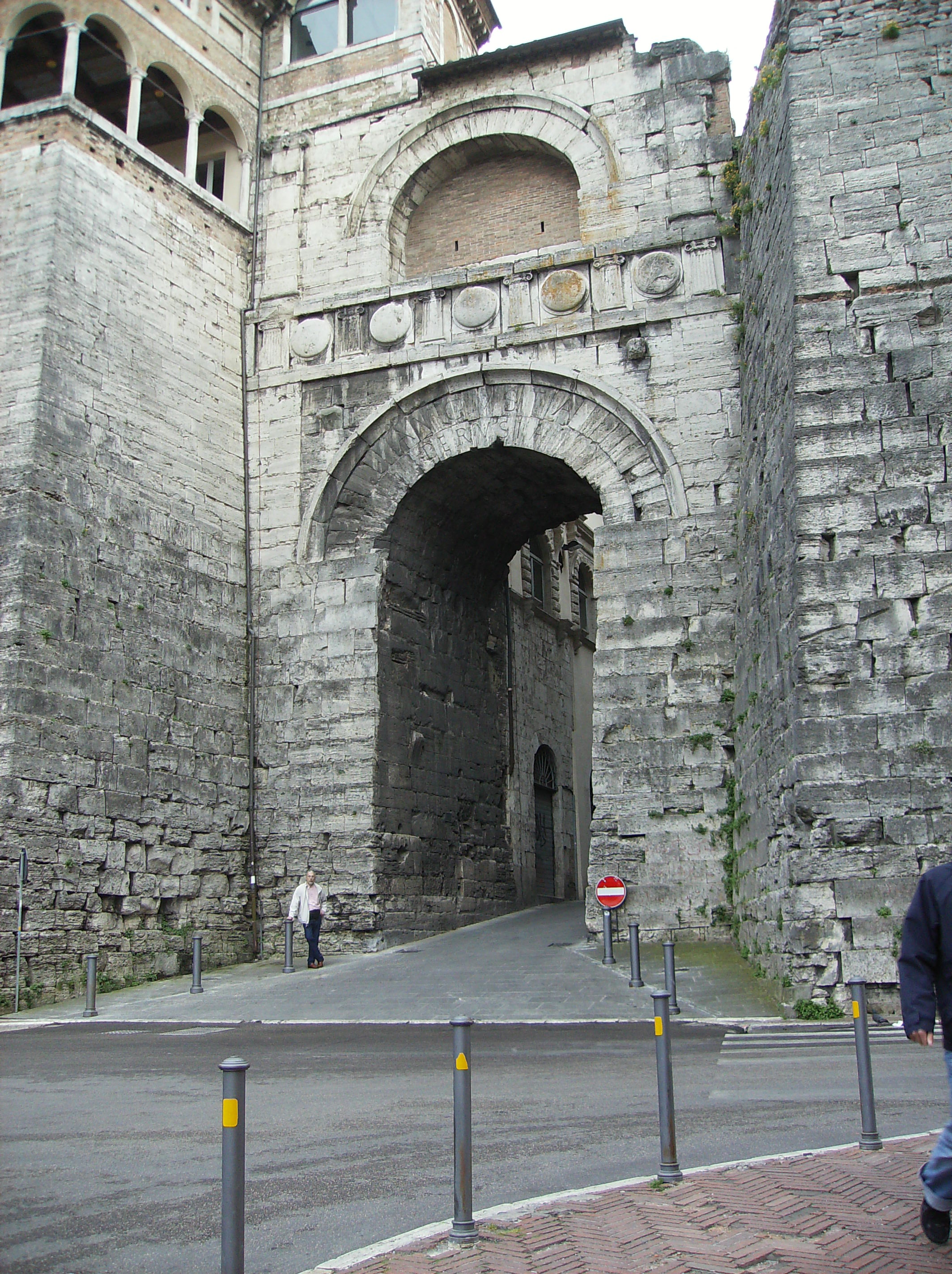
- Perugia, the Arch of Augustus

- Location within Umbria Location within Italy
- 43°6′42.0906″N 12°23′26.1384″E
- Type: Settlement
- Periods: Orientalizing period - Roman Empire
- Cultures: Etruscan Umbrian Roman
- Location: Comune di Perugia, Italy
- Region: Umbria

Site notes
- Excavation dates: yes
- Public access: yes

The ancient Perusia, now Perugia, first appears in history as one of the 12 confederate cities of Etruria. It is first mentioned in the account of the war of 310 or 309 BC between the Etruscans and the Roman Republic. In 295 BC it took an important part in a rebellion against the Romans and was reduced, with Vulsinii and Arretium (Arezzo), to seek for peace in the following year.

In 216 BC and 205 BC it assisted Rome in the Hannibalic war, but afterward it is not mentioned until 41–40 BC, when Lucius Antonius took refuge there and was reduced by Octavian after a long siege, known as the Perusine War.

A number of lead bullets used by slingers have been found in and around the city. The city was burnt, we are told, with the exception of the temples of Vulcan and Juno — the massive Etruscan terrace-walls, naturally, can hardly have suffered at all — and the town, with the territory for a mile round, was allowed to be occupied by whoever chose. Several surviving bases, inscribed Augusta sacr(um) Perusia restituta, suggest that the town must have been rebuilt almost at once, but it did not become a colony until AD 251–253.
