= List of Roman tribunes =

The following is a list of Roman tribunes as reported by ancient sources.

A tribune in ancient Rome was a person who held one of a number of offices, including tribune of the plebs (a political office to represent the interests of the plebs), Military tribune (a rank in the Roman army), Tribune of the Celeres (the commander of the king's personal bodyguard), and various other positions. Unless otherwise noted all dates are reported in BC.

== List of Tribunes of the Celeres of the Roman Kingdom ==
The following individuals held the position of Tribune of the Celeres (Tribunus Celerum), the captain of the king's bodyguard who had authority to preside over the Curiate Assembly (Comitia Curiata) during the period of the Roman Kingdom (753–509).

Date (BC)	Name
510/509	Lucius Junius Brutus

== List of tribunes of the plebs of the Roman Republic ==
The following individuals held the position of tribune of the plebs (tribunus plebis) during the Roman Republic, starting with the creation of the office in 493 BC.

=== 5th century BC ===
- 493: L. Albinius C. f. Paterculus
- 493: C. Icilius (Viscellius?) Ruga
- 493: L. Junius Brutus
- 493: C. Licinius
- 493: P. Licinius
- 493: L. Sicinius L. f. Vellutus (Bellutus?)
- 493: Sp. Icilius
- 492: Sp. Sicinius Bellutus (or Spurius Icilius?)
- 491: L. Sicinius Vellutus
- 491: M. Decius
- 489: Maenius
- 486: C. Rabuleius
- 486: P. Mucius Scaevola
- 486: Sp. Cassius
- 483: C. Maenius
- 481: Sp. Licinius (or Spurius Icilius?)
- 480: Titus Pontificius
- 476: Titus Genucius
- 476: Q. Considius
- 475: L. Caedicius
- 475: T. Statius
- 473: Cn. Genucius
- 472: Volero Publilius
- 472: L. Numitorius
- 472: Volero Publilius
- 471: C. Laetorius
- 470: Sp. Icilius
- 470: L. Mecilius
- 470: L. Numitorius
- 470: M. Duillius
- 470: C. Sicinius
- 462: C. Terentilius (Terentilius?) Arsa
- 462: Sex. Titius
- 461: M. Volscius Fictor
- 461: A. Verginius
- 460: A. Verginius
- 460: M. Volscius Fictor
- 459: A. Verginius
- 459: M. Volscius Fictor
- 458: A. Verginius
- 458: M. Volscius Fictor
- 457: A. Verginius
- 457: M. Volscius Fictor
- 456: Lucius Alienus
- 456: L. Icilius S. f.
- 455: L. Icilius S. f.
- 454: L. Siccius Dentatus
- 454: C. Calvius Cicero
- 449: C. Apronius
- 449: P. Numitorius
- 449: C. Oppius
- 449: M. Pomponius
- 449: L. Verginius
- 449: Ap. (Publius?) Villius
- 449: L. Icilius S. f.
- 449: M. Duillius
- 449: C. Sicinius
- 449: M. Titinius
- 448: A. Aternius Varus (Varus Fontinalis)
- 448: Sp. Tarpeius (Montanus Capitolinus)
- 448: L. Trebonius Asper
- 445: C. Canuleius
- 445: C. Furnius
- 442: Poetilius
- 439: Q. Caecilius
- 439: Q. Junius
- 439: L. Minucius (Esquilinus Augurinus)
- 439: Sex. Titinius
- 438: L. Minucius Augurinus
- 436: Sp. Maelius
- 423: C. Junius
- 422: Sex. (Ti.?) Antistius
- 422: M. Asellius
- 422: Ti. Spurillius
- 422: Sex. Tempanius
- 422: Q. Hortensius
- 420: A. Antistius
- 420: M'. Canuleius
- 420: M. Canuleius
- 420: Sex. Pompilius
- 416: Sp. Maecilius (at least four times, the fourth occasion in 416 BC)
- 416: Sp. (M.?) Metilius
- 415: L. Decius
- 414: M. Sextius
- 413: L. Icilius
- 412: L. Icilius
- 410: M. Menenius
- 409: Icilius (brother to the other two this year)
- 409: Icilius (brother to the other two this year)
- 409: L. Icilius
- 401: M. Minucius
- 401: Cn. Trebonius
- 401: M. Acutius
- 401: C. Lacerius
- 401: M. Metilius
- 401: P. Curatius
- 401: M. Acutius

=== 4th century BC ===
- 395: Q. Pomponius (L. f. L. n.) Rufus
- 395: A. Verginius
- 395: T. Sicinius
- 394: Q. Pomponius
- 394: T. Sicinius
- 394: A. Verginius
- 393: T. Sicinius
- 391: L. Apuleius
- 390: N. Fabius Ambustus
- 390: K. Fabius Ambustus
- 390: Q. Sulpicius Longus
- 390: Q. Servilius
- 390: P. Cornelius
- 389: Cn. (Gaius?) Marcius
- 387: L. Sicinius
- 385: M. Menenius
- 385: Q. Publilius
- 384: M. Menenius
- 376: C. Licinius C. f. P. n. Calvus Stolo
- 376: L. Sextius Sex. f. N. n. Sextinus Lateranus
- 375: C. Licinius C. f. P. n. Calvus Stolo
- 375: L. Sextius Sex. f. N. n. Sextinus Lateranus
- 374: C. Licinius C. f. P. n. Calvus Stolo
- 374: L. Sextius Sex. f. N. n. Sextinus Lateranus
- 373: C. Licinius C. f. P. n. Calvus Stolo
- 373: L. Sextius Sex. f. N. n. Sextinus Lateranus
- 372: C. Licinius C. f. P. n. Calvus Stolo
- 372: L. Sextius Sex. f. N. n. Sextinus Lateranus
- 371: C. Licinius C. f. P. n. Calvus Stolo
- 371: L. Sextius Sex. f. N. n. Sextinus Lateranus
- 370: C. Licinius C. f. P. n. Calvus Stolo
- 370: L. Sextius Sex. f. N. n. Sextinus Lateranus
- 369: C. Licinius C. f. P. n. Calvus Stolo
- 369: L. Sextius Sex. f. N. n. Sextinus Lateranus
- 368: C. Licinius C. f. P. n. Calvus Stolo
- 368: L. Sextius Sex. f. N. n. Sextinus Lateranus
- 367: C. Licinius C. f. P. n. Calvus Stolo
- 367: L. Sextius Sex. f. N. n. Sextinus Lateranus
- 362: M. Pomponius
- 358: C. Poetelius C. f. Q. n. Libo Visolus
- 357: L. Menenius
- 357: M. Duilius
- 342: L. Genucius Aventinensis
- 327: M. Flavius
- 323: M. Flavius
- 320: L. Livius
- 320: Q. Maelius
- 320: Tiberius Numicius
- 319: M. Antistius
- 316: Q. Caecilius
- 313: Ovinius
- 312: L. Cominius
- 311: L. Atilius
- 311: M. Decius
- 311: C. Marcius (Rutilus Censorinus)
- 310: P. Sempronius (Sophus)
- 308: L. Furius
- 305: Cn. Flavius C. f. (Anni f.?)
- 304: Cn. Flavius

=== 3rd century BC ===
- 300: Q. Ogulnius (Gallus)
- 300: Cn. Ogulnius
- 298: M. Curius Dentatus
- 293: M. Scantius
- 286: Maenius
- 286: Aquilius
- 285: C. Aelius
- 279: Maenius
- 270: M. Fulvius Flaccus
- 248: C. Fundanius Fundulus
- 248: Pullius
- 241: Genucius
- 232: C. Flaminius
- 220: M. Metilius
- 219: Maenius
- 218: Q. Claudius
- 217: Q. Baebius Herennius
- 217: M. Metilius
- 216: M. Minucius Augurinus
- 216: L. Scribonius Libo
- 216: Q. Baebius Herennius
- 215: C. Oppius
- 213: L. Caecilius L. f. L. n. Metellus
- 213: M. Caecilius Metellus
- 212: Sp. Carvilius
- 212: L. Carvilius
- 212: C. Servilius Casca
- 211: C. Sempronius Blaesus
- 211: P. Aquilius
- 211: C. Servilius Geminus
- 211: P. Villius
- 210: M. Lucretius
- 210: C. Arrenius
- 210: L. Arrenius
- 210: L. Atilius
- 210: M. Lucretius
- 209: C. Publicius Bibulus
- 204: M. Cincius Alimentus
- 204: Ti. Claudius Asellus
- 204: Cn. Baebius (Tamphilus)
- 204: M. Claudius Marcellus
- 204: Licinius
- 204: M. Silius
- 204: P. Silius
- 203: Cn. Baebius (Tamphilus)
- 201: M'. Acilius Glabrio
- 201: Q. Minucius Thermus
- 200: Q. Baebius
- 200: Ti. Sempronius Longus

=== 2nd century BC ===
Unless otherwise indicated, entries are based on T.R.S. Broughton, Magistrates of the Roman Republic, vol. I (1951).

- 199: P. Porcius Laeca
- 198: M. Fulvius
- 198: M'. Curius
- 197: Gaius Acilius Glabrio
- 197: Q. Fulvius
- 197: L. Oppius (Salinator)
- 196: C. Afranius (Stellio?)
- 196: C. Atinius Labeo (probably)
- 196: C. Licinius Lucullus
- 196: Q. Marcius Ralla
- 195: M. Fundanius
- 195: M. Junius Brutus
- 195: P. Junius Brutus
- 195: L. Valerius (Tappo)
- 194: M. Baebius (Tamphilus) (uncertain)
- 193: Q. Aelius Tubero
- 193: M. Sempronius (Tuditanus)
- 192: C. Titinius
- 192: M. Titinius (Curvus?)
- before 192: Plaetorius
- 191: P. Sempronius Blaesus
- 189: P. Sempronius Gracchus
- 189: C. Sempronius Rutilus
- 189: (Q.) Terentius Culleo
- 188: C. Valerius Tappo
- 187: M. Aburius
- 187: L. Mummius
- 187: Q. Mummius
- 187: Q. Petillius
- 187: Q. Petillius (Spurinus)
- c. 184: M. Caelius
- 184: C. Fannius
- 184: C. Minucius Augurinus
- 184: M. Naevius
- 184: Ti. Sempronius Gracchus
- 182: C. Orchius
- 180: L. Villius Annalis
- 177: Q. Aelius
- 177: Licinius Nerva
- 177: C. Papirius Turdus
- bef. 175: Plaetorius
- 172: M. Lucretius
- 172: Q. Marcius Scilla
- 172: M. Marcius Sermo
- 171: M. Claudius Marcellus
- 171: M. Fulvius Nobilior
- 170: Cn. Aufidius
- 170: M'. Juventius Thalna
- 169: P. Rutilius
- 169: Q. Voconius Saxa
- 168: Cn. Tremellius
- 167: M. Antonius
- 167: M. Pomponius
- 167: Ti. Sempronius
- c. 154: L. Aurelius Cotta
- c. 154: Q. Caecilius Metellus (Macedonicus)
- c. 153: Aelius (probably)
- c. 153: Fufius (probably)
- c. 149: Atinius
- 149: L. Calpurnius Piso Frugi
- 149: L. Scribonius Libo
- 149: M. Scantius (or Scantinius?) (uncertain)
- 146: Livius
- 145: C. Licinius Crassus
- 143: (T.?) Didius
- c. 142: C. Fannius
- 141: P. Mucius Scaevola
- 140: Ti. Claudius Asellus
- 139: A. Gabinius
- 138: C. Curiatius
- 138: Sp. Licinius
- 137: M. Antius Briso
- 137: L. Cassius Longinus Ravilla
- 137: C. Fannius Strabo
- 136: P. Rutilius
- 133: (Q.?) Mucius (or Minucius? Mummius?)
- 133: M. Octavius
- 133: Rubrius
- 133: P. Satureius
- 133: Ti. Sempronius Gracchus
- 132: Pompeius
- 131: C. Atinius Labeo Macerio
- c. 130: Q. Aelius Tubero
- 130 (or 131): C. Papirius Carbo
- 126: M. Junius Pennus
- c. 123: Aufeius
- c. 123: M. Junius (Silanus)
- 123: C. Sempronius Gracchus
- c. 122: (M'.?) Acilius Glabrio
- 122: M. Fulvius Flaccus
- 122: M. Livius Drusus
- c. 122: Cn. Marcius Censorinus
- 122: (C.?) Rubrius
- 122: C. Sempronius Gracchus
- c. 121: Maevius
- 121: Minucius Rufus
- 120 (or 121): L. Calpurnius Bestia
- 120: P. Decius
- 119: C. Marius
- 114: Cn. Aufidius
- 113: Sex. Peducaeus
- 111: C. Baebius
- c. 111: C. Licinius Nerva
- 111: C. Memmius
- c. 111: Sp. Thorius
- 110: L. Annius
- 110: P. Licinius Lucullus
- 109: C. Mamilius Limetanus
- 107: C. Coelius Caldus
- 107: L. Licinius Crassus
- 107: T. Manlius Mancinus
- 106: Q. Mucius Scaevola (Pontifex)
- 104: L. Cassius Longinus
- 104: Cn. Domitius Ahenobarbus
- c. 104: L. Marcius Philippus
- c. 104: Clodius (possibly)
- 103: L. Appuleius Saturninus
- 103: L. Aurelius Cotta
- 103: (M.?) Baebius (Tamphilus?)
- 103: T. Didius
- 103: C. Norbanus
- 103: L. (Antistius?) Reginus
- 102: A. Pompeius
- 101: C. Servilius Glaucia
- 100: L. Appuleius Saturninus

=== 1st century BC ===
Unless otherwise indicated, entries are based on T.R.S. Broughton, Magistrates of the Roman Republic, vol. II (1952).

- 99: L. Equitius
- 99: P. Furius
- 99: (Q.) Pompeius (Rufus)
- 99: M. Porcius Cato
- 99: Sex. Titius
- 98: C. Appuleius Decianus
- 98: Q. Calidius
- 98: C. Canuleius
- c. 98: P. Servilius Vatia (Isauricus)
- c. 97: M. Duronius
- 95: T. Didius
- 92: Cn. Papirius Carbo
- 91: M. Livius Drusus
- 91: Minicus (uncertain)
- 91: Saufeius
- c. 91: L. Sestius
- 91: P. Tarquinius
- 90: Q. Caecilius Metellus Celer
- 90: C. Papirius Carbo Arvina
- 90: Cn. Pomponius (probably)
- 90: C. Scribonius Curio
- 90: Q. Varius Severus Hibrida
- 89: L. Calpurnius Piso (Frugi)
- 89: L. Cassius
- 89: L. Memmius
- 89: C. Papirius Carbo
- 89: M. Plautius Silvanus
- 88: P. Antistius
- 88: P. Sulpicius
- 87: Sex. Lucilius
- 87: P. Magius
- 87: M. Marius Gratidianus
- 87: C. Milonius (uncertain)
- 87: M. Virgilius
- 86: P. Popillius Laenas
- 83: M. Junius Brutus
- 82: Q. Valerius Soranus
- 82: M. Octavius Ligur
- 82: L. Octavius Ligur
- 80: C. Herennius
- 77: M. Terpolius
- 76: Gnaeus Sicinius
- 75: Q. Opimius
- 74: L. Quinctius
- 73: C. Licinius Macer
- 71: M. Lollius Palicanus
- 70: A. Plautius (Varus)
- 69: Q. Cornificius
- 69: Q. Manlius
- c. 69: C. Visellius Varro
- 68: C. Antius Restio
- 68: C. Antonius Hibrida
- 68: Q. Caecilius (Metellus Celer? Nepos?)
- 68: Cn. Cornelius
- 68: C. Fundanius
- 68: L. Hostilius (Dasianus?)
- 68: Q. Marcius
- 68: C. Popilius
- 68: M. Valerius
- 68: L. (Volcatius?)
- 67: L. Roscius Otho
- 67: C. Cornelius
- 67: P. Servilius Globulus
- 67: A. Gabinius
- 67: C. Papirius Carbo
- 67: L. Roscius Otho
- 67: L. Trebellius
- 66: C. Manilius (Crispus?)
- 66: C. Memmius Geminus
- 65: C. Papius
- 65: Q. Cornificius
- 64: Fabius
- 63: Servilius Rullus
- 63: T. Labienus
- 63: T. Ampius Balbus
- 63: P. Servilius Rullus
- 63: L. Caecilius Rufus
- 62: Q. Caecilius Metellus Nepos
- 62: L. Calpurnius Bestia
- 62: L. Marius
- 62: M. Porcius Cato
- 62: L. Fabricus
- 62: Q. Minucius Thermus
- 61: M. Aufidius Lurco
- 61: Q. Fufius Calenus
- 61: C. Caecilius Cornutus
- 60: L. Flavius
- 60: C. Herennius
- 59: C. Cosconius
- 59: C. Herennius
- 59: P. Vatinius
- 59: Q. Ancharius
- 59: C. Alfius Flavus
- 59: Q. Caecilius Metellus Pius Scipio Nasica
- 59: Cn. Domitius Calvinus
- 59: Cn. Fannius
- 59: P. Nigidius Figulus
- 58: P. Clodius Pulcher
- 58: M'. Curius
- 58: Cn. Manlius
- 58: L. Ninnius Quadratus
- 58: L. Novius (Niger?)
- 58: Q. Terentius Culleo
- 58: Aelius Ligus
- 58: L. Antistus
- 57: T. Annius Milo
- 57: Sex. Atilius Serranus Gavianus
- 57: C. Curtius Peducaeanus
- 57: C. Messius
- 57: Q. Numerius Rufus (Gracchus)
- 57: Aelius Ligur
- 57: Gratidius
- 57: Marcus Cispius
- 57: P. Sestius
- 57: C. Cestilius
- 57: M'. Curtius Peducaeanus
- 57: Q. Fabricius
- 57: T. Fadius (Gallus?)
- 56: Cn. Plancius
- 56: L. Caninius Gallus
- 56: M. Nonius Sufenas
- 56: A. Plautius
- 56: C. Porcius Cato
- 56: L. Procilius
- 56: L. Racilius
- 56: P. Rutilius Lupus
- 56: Antistius Vetus
- 56: Cassius
- 55: P. Aquillius Gallus
- 55: C. Ateius Capito
- 55: L. Roscius Fabatus
- 55: C. Trebonius
- 55: Mamilius
- 55: A. Allienus
- 55: Sex. Peducaeus
- 55: C. Fabius
- 54: D. Laelius
- 54: Q. Mucius Scaevola not the Augur, but the correct name.
- 54: C. Memmius
- 54: Terentius
- 53: M. Coelius Vinicianus
- 53: P. Licinius Crassus Junianus
- 53: C. Lucilius Hirrius
- 52: M. Caelius Rufus
- 52: Q. Manilius Cumanus
- 52: Q. Pompeius Rufus
- 52: T. Munatius Plancus Byrsa
- 52: C. Sallustius Crispus
- 51: C. Caelius Rufus
- 51: P. Cornelius
- 51: C. Vibius Pansa Caetronianus
- 51: L. Vinicius
- 50: C. Scribonius Curio
- 50: C. Furnius
- 49: M. Antonius
- 49: L. Caecilius Metellus
- 49: Q. Cassius Longinus
- 49: L. Marcius Philippus
- 49: Aurelius Cotta
- 49: C. Cassius Longinus
- 49: Rubrius
- 48: A. Hirtius
- 47: C. Asinius Pollio
- 47: P. Cornelius Dolabella
- 47: L. Trebellius
- 46: C. Antonius (uncertain)
- 45: Pontius Aquila
- 44: L. Antonius
- 44: L. Caesetius Flavus
- 44: Ti. Canutius
- 44: D. Carfulenus
- 44: L. Cassius Longinus
- 44: L. Decidius Saxa
- 44: C. Epidius Marullus
- 44: C. Helvius Cinna
- 44: (Hostilius) Saserna
- 44: (Nonius) Asprenas
- 44: Servilius
- 44: Lucius Flaminius (Chilo?)
- 43: L. Clodius
- 43: P. Appuleius
- 43: P. Titius
- 43: Tullus Hostilius
- 43: L. Cornificius
- 43: Salvius
- 43: M. Servilius
- 43: P. Servilius Casca Longus
- 43: M. Terentius Varro Gibba
- 43: M. Agrippa
- 42: L. Clodius (Bithynicus?)
- 42: Tullus Hostilius
- 42: M. Insteius
- 42: Rufrenus
- 41: L. Memmius
- 41: Falcidius
- 40: P. Falcidius
- 39: Q. Cloelius
- 32: Nonius Balbus
- 27: Sex. Pacuvius Taurus

== List of holders of tribunicia potestas in the Roman Empire ==
Holders who later became Roman emperor are highlighted in bold. For holders who only wielded tribunicia potestas as emperor, see list of Roman emperors.

List of holders of Tribunician Powers without holding the office of Tribune
Name	Emperor	Duration	Ref
Gaius Julius Caesar	N/A (himself as dictator)	48 – 44 BC	
**Imperator Caesar Augustus**		23 BC – 14 AD	
Marcus Vipsanius Agrippa	Augustus (son-in-law)	18 – 12 BC	
**Tiberius Julius Caesar**	Augustus (step-son, son-in-law and later adopted son)	6 – 1 BC 4 – 34 AD	
Drusus Julius Caesar	Tiberius (son)	22 – 23 AD	
**Titus Caesar Vespasianus**	Vespasian (son)	71 – 81	
**Marcus Ulpius Nerva Traianus**	Nerva (adopted son)	97 – 98	
Lucius Aelius Caesar	Hadrian (adopted sons)	136 – 138	
**Titus Aelius Caesar Antoninus**	Hadrian (adopted sons)	138	
**Marcus Aelius Aurelius Verus Caesar**	Antoninus Pius (adopted son and son-in-law)	147 – 180	

== Bibliography ==
- Titus Livius Patavinus (Livy), Ab Urbe Condita (History of Rome).
- Dionysius of Halicarnassus, Romaike Archaiologia (Roman Antiquities).
- Broughton, T. Robert S. (1952–1986). The Magistrates of the Roman Republic. American Philological Association.
- Smith, William (ed. 1870), Dictionary of Greek and Roman Biography and Mythology.
- Marcus Tullius Cicero, Brutus, De Oratore, De Officiis, De Natura Deorum, Epistulae ad Familiares, Laelius de Amicitia, In Verrem, Pro Gaio Rabirio Perduellionis Reo, Florus, Pro Quintus Roscius, Epistulae ad Atticum, Epistulae ad Quintum Fratrem, In Vatinium Testem, Post Reditum in Senatu, De Haruspicum Responsis, Pro Plancio, De Domo Sua, Pro Sestio, Pro Rabirio Postumo, Philippicae.
- Plutarch, The Life of Gaius Gracchus, The Life of Tiberius Gracchus, The Life of Marius, The Life of Pompey, The Life of Crassus, The Life of Cato the Younger, The Life of Cicero, The Life of Caesar, The Life of Antony.
- Macrobius Ambrosius Theodosius, Saturnalia.
- Publius Cornelius Tacitus, Annales (Annals), Historiae (Histories), De Origine et Situ Germanorum (The Origin and Situation of the Germans, or "Germania").
- Stockton, David (1979). The Gracchi. Oxford University Press.
- Cornell, T. J. The Fragments of the Roman Historians (2013)
- Appianus Alexandrinus (Appian), Bellum Civile (The Civil War), Bella Mithridatica (The Mithridatic Wars)
- Gaius Sallustius Crispus (Sallust), Bellum Jugurthinum (The Jugurthine War).
- Auctor, De Viris Illustribus (On Illustrious Men)
- Julius Obsequens, Liber de Prodigiis (Book of Prodigies)
- Marcus Velleius Paterculus, Compendium of Roman History
- Hazel, John. Who's Who in the Roman World, Psychology Press (2001).
- Tyrrell, William B. Biography of Titus Labienus, Caesar's Lieutenant in Gaul. Diss. Michigan State Univ., 1970. 10 May 2007
- Valerius Maximus, Factorum ac Dictorum Memorabilium (Memorable Facts and Sayings).
- Gaius Suetonius Tranquilis (Suetonius), Caligula, The Life Of Caesar
- Quintus Asconius Pedianus, Commentarius in Oratio Ciceronis Pro Milone (Commentary on Cicero's Oration Pro Milone).
- https://web.archive.org/web/20080422073924/http://www.ancientlibrary.com/smith-bio/1334.html
- Chisholm, Hugh, ed. (1911). "Cassius s.v Quintus Cassius Longinus". Encyclopædia Britannica. 5 (11th ed.). Cambridge University Press.
- Gaius Julius Caesar, De Bello Civili (On the Civil War)
- Lucius Cassius Dio Cocceianus (Cassius Dio), Roman History.
- Michel Crawford & Timothy Peter Wiseman, "The Coinage of the Age of Sulla", in The Numismatic Chronicle and Journal of the Royal Numismatic Society, Seventh Series, Vol. 4 (1964), pp. 141–158, Appendix II, pp. 156, 157.
