= Annalis =

Annalis may refer to:

- Lex Villia annalis, a Roman law regulating age requirements for magistrates
- Lucius Villius Annalis, Roman politician, author of the lex Villia annalis, from which he acquired the surname
- Lucius Villius Annalis (praetor 43 BC)
