= Silius (disambiguation) =

Silius is a town in Sardinia, Italy.

Silius may also refer to:

== People of Ancient Rome ==
- Silia gens, ancient Roman family
- Publius Silius Nerva (fl. 20 BC), senator, general and consul
- Publius Silius (fl. AD 3), consul
- Gaius Silius (consul) (died AD 24), senator, general and consul
- Gaius Silius (lover of Messalina) (c. AD 13–48), executed senator
- Silius Italicus (c. 26 – c. 101 AD), senator, orator and epic poet
- Marcus Silius Messala (born c. AD 160, fl.193)), senator and consul

== Modern people with the surname ==
- Harriet Silius (born 1948), Finnish women's studies academic

== Modern people with the given name ==
- Silius Titus (1623–1704), English politician

== Other uses ==
- Journey to Silius, 1990 video game
