= Villia gens =

Ancient Roman family

The gens Villia was a plebeian family at Rome. Its members are mentioned in the first century of the Republic, but the only Villius who obtained the consulship was Publius Villius Tappulus, in BC 199.

== Praenomina ==
The Villii of the Republic used a variety of praenomina, including Appius, a name usually associated with the patrician Claudii, and Tiberius, both of which were fairly uncommon, as well as more common names such as Lucius, Publius, and Sextus.

== Branches and cognomina ==
There were two main families of the Villii, bearing the cognomina Annalis and Tappulus. The former was given in consequence of Lucius Villius, tribune of the plebs in 179 BC, and author of the lex Villia Annalis, establishing the minimum age (annus, literally a person's "year") at which candidates could stand for public offices. A few of the Villii are mentioned without a surname.

== Members ==
This list includes abbreviated praenomina. For an explanation of this practice, see filiation.

- Appius Villius, (Note: Since the praenomen Appius is usually associated with the patrician Claudii (among whom was the leader of the decemvirs who were deposed in the year Villius was elected tribune), some manuscripts amend the tribune's name to Publius.) tribune of the plebs in 449 BC, the year in which the decemvirs were abolished.

=== Villii Tappuli ===
- Tiberius Villius Tappulus, grandfather of Publius Villius Tappulus, consul in 199 BC.
- Tiberius Villius Ti. f. Tappulus, father of Publius Villius Tappulus, the consul of 199.
- Lucius Villius Tappulus, plebeian aedile in BC 213, is probably the same as the praetor in 199 BC, who was assigned the province of Sardinia.
- Publius Villius Ti. f. Ti. n. Tappulus, consul in 199 BC, during the war with Philip, against whom he had the command. The following year he was legate under the consul Titus Quinctius Flamininus. The two were later among the commissioners who arranged the terms of the peace after Philip's defeat in 196. Afterward, Tappulus served as an envoy to Antiochus, and an ambassador to Greece.

=== Villii Annales ===
- Lucius Villius Annalis, tribune of the plebs in 180 BC, passed the lex Villia Annalis, through which he and his descendants obtained their surname.
- Sextus Villius (Annalis), a friend of Titus Annius Milo, described only as Sextus Villius, is probably the same person as Sextus Annalis, mentioned by Quintilian.
- Lucius Villius Annalis, father of the praetor.
- Lucius Villius L. f. Annalis, praetor in 43 BC, was proscribed and put to death by the triumvirs, after having been betrayed by his own son. Eight years earlier, Cicero mentioned had him in a letter to Marcus Caelius Rufus.
- (Lucius) Villius L. f. L. n. Annalis, son of the praetor, was a candidate for the quaestorship, and was canvassing for votes with his father when news of the elder Villius' proscription caused him to flee to the house of one of his clientes. The son, guessing at his whereabouts, betrayed him to the triumvirs, and was rewarded with the aedileship. But soon afterward he was killed in a drunken brawl, with the same soldiers who had slain his father.

=== Others ===
- Gaius Villius, a friend of Tiberius Gracchus, who was put to death after the murder of Gracchus in 133 BC. Villius was killed in the manner of a parricide, by being shut in a vessel with snakes and vipers.

== See also ==
- List of Roman gentes

== Bibliography ==
- Marcus Tullius Cicero, Epistulae ad Familiares.
- Titus Livius (Livy), Ab Urbe Condita (History of Rome).
- Valerius Maximus, Factorum ac Dictorum Memorabilium (Memorable Facts and Sayings).
- Marcus Fabius Quintilianus (Quintilian), Institutio Oratoria.
- Appianus Alexandrinus (Appian), Bellum Civile (The Civil War).
- Plutarchus, Lives of the Noble Greeks and Romans.
- Dictionary of Greek and Roman Biography and Mythology, William Smith, ed., Little, Brown and Company, Boston (1849).
- T. Robert S. Broughton, The Magistrates of the Roman Republic, American Philological Association (1952).
