= Rabuleia gens =

Family in ancient Rome

The gens Rabuleia was a minor plebeian family at ancient Rome. Members of this gens are first mentioned in the early decades of the Republic, and Manius Rabuleius was a member of the second decemvirate in 450 BC. However, the Rabuleii subsequently fell into obscurity, and only a few of this family are known from later inscriptions.

== Origin ==
The nomen Rabuleius belongs to a large class of gentilicia formed with the suffix -eius, which was often, but not exclusively of Oscan origin. According to Dionysius, the decemvir Manius Rabuleius was a patrician, although earlier Dionysius mentions a Rabuleius who was tribune of the plebs. However, Broughton points out that all of the other Rabuleii known were plebeians, and that precisely half of the decemvirs in 450 are either described as plebeians, or bore plebeian names, including Rabuleius. This view appears to have prevailed in modern scholarship, and it seems reasonably certain that the Rabuleii were plebeians.

== Branches and cognomina ==
Neither of the Rabuleii mentioned in the early Republic bore a cognomen, but one of those known from inscriptions was surnamed Rufus, red, indicating that he or one of his ancestors probably had red hair. A freedman of the gens bore the cognomen Celer, swift.

== Members ==
This list includes abbreviated praenomina. For an explanation of this practice, see filiation.

- Gaius Rabuleius, tribune of the plebs in 486 BC, attempted to reconcile the consuls following the introduction of the agrarian law of Spurius Cassius Vecellinus.
- Manius Rabuleius, a member of the second college of decemvirs in 450 BC. When the decemvirs continued in power the following year, Rabuleius was sent to assist his colleague, Quintus Fabius Vibulanus, carry on the war against the Sabines, but they were defeated at Eretum.
- Quintus Rabuleius Q. l. Celer, a freedman buried at Tibur in Latium.
- Rabuleia Helena, named in an inscription from Rome.
- Sextus Rabuleius Sex. l. Isio, a freedman buried at Rome.
- Lucius Rabuleius Priscus, named in an inscription from Rome, dating to circa AD 115.
- Publius Rabuleius P. f. Rufus, aged sixteen, named in an inscription from Rome.

== See also ==
- List of Roman gentes

== Bibliography ==
- Titus Livius (Livy), History of Rome.
- Dionysius of Halicarnassus, Romaike Archaiologia.
- Dictionary of Greek and Roman Biography and Mythology, William Smith, ed., Little, Brown and Company, Boston (1849).
- Theodor Mommsen et alii, Corpus Inscriptionum Latinarum (The Body of Latin Inscriptions, abbreviated CIL), Berlin-Brandenburgische Akademie der Wissenschaften (1853–present).
- George Davis Chase, "The Origin of Roman Praenomina", in Harvard Studies in Classical Philology, vol. VIII, pp. 103–184 (1897).
- T. Robert S. Broughton, The Magistrates of the Roman Republic, American Philological Association (1952).
- Timothy J. Cornell, The Beginnings of Rome: Italy and Rome from the Bronze Age to the Punic Wars (c. 1000–264 BC), Routledge, London (1995).
