= Alban people =

Ancient Italian culture

The Albans were Latins from the ancient city of Alba Longa, southeast of Rome. Some of Rome's prominent patrician families such as the Julii, Servilii, Quinctii, Geganii, Curiatii and Cloelii were of Alban descent.

== Origins ==
According to Roman mythology, Ascanius, son of Trojan War hero Aeneas, founded the Alban tribe when he settled in Alba Longa around 1152 BC. Literary sources suggest the city's name is derived from the white (alba) sow Aeneas saw when arriving in Latium. Dionysus of Halicarnassus reports that:

The Albans were a mixed nation composed of Pelasgians, of Arcadians, of the Epeans who came from Elis, and, last of all, of the Trojans who came into Italy with Aeneas, the son of Anchises and Aphrodite, after the taking of Troy. It is probable that a barbarian element also from among the neighbouring peoples or a remnant of the ancient inhabitants of the place was mixed with the Greek. But all these people, having lost their tribal designations, came to be called by one common name, Latins, after Latinus, who had been king of this country.

Based on limited archaeological evidence, experts say the Alban tribe inhabited the long ridge between the modern-day Lake Albano and Monte Cavo.

== Power in Latium ==
At its height, the Albans and the city of Alba Longa exerted great power and influence over Latium. In particular, literary sources such as Pliny the Elder’s Historia Naturalis state that Alba Longa headed a league of city-states in Latium, possibly called Prisci Latini. Most of these sources tend to vary regarding the political structure of the alliance as well as Alba Longa's hegemonic role. Many historians say it is uncertain if the Albans exerted any sort of dominance since most of the surviving sources are biased.

The Prisci Latini are the colonists sent out by the Alban king, Latinus Silvius, who would be made to submit to Roman authority following the destruction of Alba Longa in the mid-7th century BC. Those colonists would be a part of 30 villages that would form the populi Albenses which may have been related to the 30 Latin villages of the same time in ancient Latium.

== Religious customs ==
However, Pliny and others generally agree that the communities of Latium gathered at Alba Longa for sacrificial rites. Every year in the spring, the tribes would congregate on Mons Albanus (Monte Cavo) to worship Iuppiter Latiaris. The festival was known as Feriae Latinae. The major custom in this ceremony was a great banquet, which required all attending cities to bring food, especially meat. These offerings were then divided among the attendants and owning some of the food signified membership within the league. Pliny lists 30 tribes participating in the Feriae Latinae. This festival continued as an annual event through the imperial age of Rome. There is also evidence that leaders from the surrounding tribes of Latium met at a spring in Alba Longa known as Aqua Ferentia. This supports the theory that the Albans were central figures in Latium. Alba Longa was also known for its wine and good stone quarries.

== Downfall ==
The prosperity of the Alban people declined in the seventh century BC. Tullus Hostilius waged war against Alba Longa and ultimately devastated the city, sparing only the temples. Historians attribute our lack of archaeological evidence to Tullus Hostilius’ campaign. Indeed, portions of the city wall's foundation are all that remain. After this victory, Rome assumed the command that had long been held by the Albans. Many from Alba Longa immigrated to Rome following the war and some of Rome’s most elite patrician families (including the Julii) trace their heritage back to Alba Longa, which illustrates its importance in the history of Rome.

== Roman gentes of Alban origin ==
- Cloelia gens
- Curiatia gens
- Gegania gens
- Julia gens
- Metilia gens
- Memmia gens
- Numitoria gens
- Quinctia gens
- Servilia gens
- Tullia gens

== Prominent Romans of Alban ancestry ==
- Julius Caesar, Roman military general, statesman, and writer
- Cicero, Roman lawyer, orator, philosopher, and statesman.
