= Villius =

Villius is a name. Notable people with the name include:

- Hans Villius (1923–2012), Swedish historian
- Lucius Villius Annalis, Roman politician
- Lucius Villius Annalis (praetor 43 BC), Roman politician
- Publius Villius Tappulus, Roman politician
