= Maevia gens =

The gens Maevia, occasionally written Mevia, was a minor plebeian family at ancient Rome. Members of this gens are known from the later Republic, although the family may possibly have been much older, and well into Imperial times. None of the Maevii ever obtained the higher offices of the Roman state. Their nomen is frequently confounded with the similar Maenius.

== Praenomina ==
The main praenomina of the Maevii seem to have been Quintus and Lucius, both very common names, which occur several times in inscriptions of this gens. There are also examples of Gnaeus, Aulus, Marcus, and Gaius, also common names throughout Roman history, but there are too few examples to know if these were regular praenomina of the Maevian gens, or used only in particular families.

== Members ==
This list includes abbreviated praenomina. For an explanation of this practice, see filiation.

- Maevius, according to some manuscripts, proposed the addition of an event called instauratitius to the Circensian games, occurring in 489 BC. He would probably have been a tribune of the plebs, but in the better manuscripts, his name is given as Maenius, and he might be the same person as Gaius Maenius, tribune of the plebs in 483.
- Marcus Maevius, a military tribune, who fell in battle against Mago in 203 BC, during the Second Punic War; possibly should be Maenius.
- Maevius, a soldier during the Civil War, who slew his own brother, an episode commemorated by two elegiac poems in the Latin Anthology.
- Maevius, an infamous poetaster of the Augustan age, remembered chiefly from the barbs hurled at him by his contemporaries, Vergil and Horace. He is said to have written on the spendthrift son of the tragedian Clodius Aesopus. Either he or his cohort, Marcus Bavius, is thought to have written the Antibucolica, two pastoral poems written as parodies of Vergil's Eclogues, or Bucolica.
- Lucius Maevius Quintianus, one of several persons who dedicated an altar to Asclepius at Rome in AD 228.
- Quintus Maevius Aglaus, the husband of Clodia, whose funerary inscription was found at Rome.
- Clodius Maevius Q. f. Gallianus, the son of Quintus Maevius Aglaus and Clodia.
- Gnaeus Maevius Soranus, the father of Gnaeus Maevius Euprepius, according to a funerary inscription found at Rome.
- Gnaeus Maevius Cn. f. Euprepius, buried at Rome, according to his funerary inscription.
- Aulus Maevius, the former master of Marcus Maevius Onesimus.
- Marcus Maevius A. l. Onesimus, buried at Rome.
- Quintus Maevius Julianus, buried at Muzuca in the province of Byzacena, aged twenty-seven.
- Lucius Maevius Honoratus, buried at Uchi Maius in Africa, aged fifty.
- Marcus Maevius, buried at what is now Djebel Djelloud in Tunisia, aged forty.
- Quintus Maevius Felix, buried at Carthage, aged fifty-five.
- Gaius Maevius Victor, made an offering to Saturn at what is now Sidi Soltan in Algeria.
- Lucius Maevius Aeros, buried at Ammaedara, aged one hundred and fourteen, according to his monument.
- Quintus Maevius Heros, aged forty-five, buried at Ammaedara, with his wife, Antonia Fortunata, aged sixty.
- Lucius Maevius Speratus, dedicated monuments at Ammaedara to his parents, Quintus Maevius Heros and Antonia Fortunata, and to Lucius Maevius Aeros, perhaps his grandfather.
- Maevia Secunda, perhaps a daughter of Quintus Maevius Heros, buried at Ammaedara, aged thirty-three.
- Maevius Maximinus, husband of Marcia Maximina, buried at Rome, aged sixty.
- Lucius Maevius Valerianus, mentioned in an inscription at Hadrumetum.
- Quintus Maevius Q. f. Paulinus, buried at Castellum Elefantum in Numidia, aged twenty-five.

== See also ==
- List of Roman gentes

== Bibliography ==
- Titus Livius (Livy), Ab Urbe Condita (History of Rome).
- Ambrosius Theodosius Macrobius, Saturnalia.
- Pieter Burmann, Latin Anthology, Johann Christian Wernsdorf, ed. (1759–1778).
- Johann Christian Wernsdorf, Poëtae Latini Minores (Minor Latin Poets), Altenburg, Helmstedt (1780–1799).
- Dictionary of Greek and Roman Biography and Mythology, William Smith, ed., Little, Brown and Company, Boston (1849).
- Theodor Mommsen et alii, Corpus Inscriptionum Latinarum (The Body of Latin Inscriptions, abbreviated CIL), Berlin-Brandenburgische Akademie der Wissenschaften (1853–present).
- Giovanni Battista de Rossi, Inscriptiones Christianae Urbis Romanae Septimo Saeculo Antiquiores (Christian Inscriptions from Rome of the First Seven Centuries, abbreviated ICUR), Vatican Library, Rome (1857–1861, 1888).
- Gustav Wilmanns, Inscriptiones Africae Latinae (Latin Inscriptions from Africa, abbreviated ILAfr), Georg Reimer, Berlin (1881).
- Ernst Diehl, Inscriptiones Latinae Christianae Veteres (Ancient Latin Christian Inscriptions, abbreviated ILCV), Weidmann, Berlin (1925–1931).
- T. Robert S. Broughton, The Magistrates of the Roman Republic, American Philological Association (1952).
- Epigraphik-Datenbank Clauss/Slaby (EDCS).
