= Metilia gens =

Ancient Roman family

The gens Metilia was a minor family at ancient Rome. Although they occur throughout Roman history, and several were tribunes of the plebs, beginning in the fifth century BC, none of the Metilii attained the higher offices of the Roman state until imperial times, when several of them became consul.

== Origin ==
The nomen Metilius appears to belong to a class of gentilicia arising from diminutive versions of other names, originally ending in -ulus. In this case the name might have been the praenomen Mettius, (Note: Sometimes written Metius or Mettus.) or perhaps another nomen, such as that of gens Mettia.

The Metilii are mentioned as one of the Alban houses that came to Rome following the destruction of their city in the reign of Tullus Hostilius, the third King of Rome. They were admitted to the senate, implying that they were originally patricians, but all of the Metilii mentioned during the time of the Republic were plebeians.

== Branches and cognomina ==
The Metilii of the Republic do not appear to have been divided into branches, the only surname being Croto, an apparent reference to Crotona, an ancient Greek city in Bruttium, which played an important part in the Second Punic War. Under the Empire, the leading family of the Metilii bore the surname of Nepos, literally "grandson". Several consuls of the late first and second centuries were descended from this family, through both the paternal and maternal lines, and are included here if they bore the nomen Metilius, even though, strictly speaking, some of them belonged to other gentes, such as the Atilii.

== Members ==
This list includes abbreviated praenomina. For an explanation of this practice, see filiation.

- Spurius Metilius, (Note: Broughton is not certain of his praenomen, but suggests "Marcus", perhaps identifying him with the tribune of 401. Livy's mention is ambiguous, and could be interpreted as giving his praenomen as "Spurius", or not giving it at all.) tribune of the plebs in 416 BC, together with his colleague, Spurius Maecilius, attempted to pass a law distributing some of the recently acquired public land to the plebeians. This measure was opposed by the patricians, led by Appius Claudius Crassus, who succeeded in convincing the other tribunes to veto the law.
- Marcus Metilius, tribune of the plebs in 401 BC, impeached Lucius Verginius and Manius Sergius for having allowed their private feud to result in a calamitous defeat during the siege of Veii the previous year. Metilius and his colleagues continued to press for a distribution of the public land, and forbade the collection of the war-tax, hoping to secure passage of the law.
- Marcus Metilius, tribune of the plebs in 217 BC, during the Second Punic War, promulgated the law giving Marcus Minucius Rufus, the magister equitum, authority equal to that of the dictator, Quintus Fabius Maximus Verrucosus. In 212, he was the senate's legate to the consuls. He was probably the author of the lex Metilia de fullonibus, a law regulating the materials used by fullers.
- Titus Metilius Croto, (Note: Titus Maecilius Croto, in some sources.) legate of the praetor Appius Claudius Pulcher in 215 BC, sent to lead the survivors of Cannae to Sicily.
- Metilius, the husband of Cremutia Marcia. Metilius died while their son who died in 37/38 was a child.
- Metilius, son of Cremutia Marcia. He died young in 37/38 and his mother's mourning is recorded in Seneca's work De Consolatione ad Marciam.
- Metilia Marcia, daughter of Cremutia Marcia.
- Metilia Rufina, daughter of Cremutia Marcia.
- Metilius, another son of Cremutia Marcia, he also died young, before his brother who died in 37/38, but he also may have left behind children.
- Metilia, elder daughter of the young man who died in 37/38. She and her younger sister, along their mother and grandmother are described mourning in Seneca's work. Seneca recommends Cremutia Marcia that she should focus her energy on her son's daughters to feel better.
- Metilia, younger daughter of the young man who died in 37/38. She and her older sister, along their mother and grandmother are described mourning in Seneca's work. Seneca recommends Cremutia Marcia that she should focus her energy on her son's daughters to feel better.
- Publius Metilius Sabinus Nepos, consul suffectus in AD 91.
- Publius Metilius Nepos, consul suffectus in AD 103.
- Marcus Atilius M. f. Metilius Bradua, consul in AD 108, served at various times as governor of Roman Britain, Germania Superior or Germania Inferior, and Africa Proconsularis, under the emperors Trajan and Hadrian.
- Publius Metilius P. f. Secundus, consul suffectus in AD 123. (Note: PIR identifies him as consul designatus for AD 123.)
- Marcus Atilius M. f. M. n. Metilius Bradua Caucidius Tertullus Claudius Atticus Vibullius Pollio Gauidius Latiaris Atrius Bassus, governor of Africa Proconsularis under the emperor Antoninus Pius.
- Marcus Sedatius C. f. Severianus Julius Acer Metillius Nepos Rufinus Tiberius Rutilianus Censor, consul suffectus in AD 153.
- Marcus Metilius P. f. Aquillius Regulus Nepos Volusius Torquatus Fronto, consul in AD 157.

== See also ==
- List of Roman gentes

== Bibliography ==
- Titus Livius (Livy), Ab Urbe Condita (History of Rome).
- Dionysius of Halicarnassus, Romaike Archaiologia.
- Gaius Plinius Secundus (Pliny the Elder), Naturalis Historia (Natural History).
- Dictionary of Greek and Roman Biography and Mythology, William Smith, ed., Little, Brown and Company, Boston (1849).
- George Davis Chase, "The Origin of Roman Praenomina", in Harvard Studies in Classical Philology, vol. VIII (1897).
- Paul von Rohden, Elimar Klebs, & Hermann Dessau, Prosopographia Imperii Romani (The Prosopography of the Roman Empire, abbreviated PIR), Berlin (1898).
- T. Robert S. Broughton, The Magistrates of the Roman Republic, American Philological Association (1952).
- A. R. Birley, The Roman government of Britain, Oxford University Press, 2005.
