= Silia gens =

Ancient Roman family

The gens Silia was a plebeian family at ancient Rome. Members of this gens are mentioned as early as the fifth century BC, but first to hold the consulship was Publius Silius Nerva, in the time of Augustus. The Silii remained prominent until the time of the Severan dynasty, in the early third century.

== Origin ==
The nomen Silius is derived from the cognomen Silus, originally designating someone with an upturned nose. It was one of a large class of cognomina derived from the physical characteristics of an individual. Chase classifies Silius among those gentilicia that either originated at Rome, or cannot be shown to have come from anywhere else.

== Praenomina ==
The main praenomina of the Silii were Aulus, Publius, and Gaius, all of which were common throughout Roman history. Other common praenomina were used occasionally.

== Branches and cognomina ==
Nerva, originally applied to someone described as "sinewy", was the cognomen of the most prominent family of the Silii, and the only surname of this gens that occurs on coins. This family was prominent from the age of Cicero to the time of Nero. One branch of this family was descended from a member who was adopted by Aulus Licinius Nerva; but as the two families shared a surname prior to this adoption, they may perhaps have been related.

Other surnames of the Silii that did not become hereditary included Bassus, "stout" or "sturdy"; Italicus, referring to someone from "Italy", originally describing the region of Bruttium, before it came to describe the rest of the peninsula; and Messala or Messalla, a surname usually associated with the ancient Valeria gens. This name was derived from the city of Messana in Sicily, which was rescued from a Carthaginian naval blockade by Manius Valerius Maximus during the Second Punic War; the name was passed down to his descendants, perhaps including Marcus Silius Messala.

== Members ==
This list includes abbreviated praenomina. For an explanation of this practice, see filiation.

- Quintus Silius was one of the first plebeians elected quaestor, in 409 BC, a century after the founding of the Republic.
- Publius Silius and Marcus Silius were both tribunes of the plebs in 204 BC and cited by Sextus Pompeius Festus for regulating public weights.
- Titus Silius, one of Caesar's officers during the Gallic Wars, was sent as an emissary to buy grain from the Veneti in 56 BC, but taken captive by them.
- Aulus Silius, a friend of Cicero, who mentions him in several of his letters to Atticus.
- Publius Silius, propraetor of Bithynia and Pontus in 51 BC, and a friend of both Atticus and Cicero. He was probably the father of Publius Silius Nerva, consul in 20 BC.
- Publius Silius P. f. Nerva, consul in 20 BC, subsequently sent against the Camunni and the Vennones, whom he defeated.
- Publius Silius P. f. P. n. Nerva, consul suffectus in AD 3, had been a moneyer, and commanded several legions prior to his consulship.
- Aulus Silius P. f. P. n. Nerva, consul in AD 7, was adopted by Aulus Licinius Nerva, becoming Aulus Licinius Nerva Silianus. He had been a moneyer, and fought with distinction in the Illyrian War in the year before he was named consul. He was a personal friend of Augustus, who highly praised his various qualities, but died without realizing his full potential.
- Gaius Silius P. f. P. n. Nerva, (Note: Erroneously called "Gaius Silius Aulus Caecina Largus" in many sources, based on an ambiguous inscription; Aulus Caecina Largus has been shown to have been his colleague.) consul in AD 13, and subsequently governor of Germania Superior. He and his friend, Germanicus, fought with great success against the Chatti and Treveri. After Germanicus' death, Silius put down a revolt of the Aedui. In AD 24, he was falsely accused of repetundae and maiestas, and took his own life rather than face condemnation.
- Publius Silius P. f. P. n. Nerva, consul in AD 28.
- Silius Bassus, an orator mentioned by Seneca the Elder.
- Gaius Silius C. f. P. n. Nerva, a Roman senator, was induced by the empress Messalina, who was infatuated by his beauty, to divorce his wife, Junia Silana, and enter into a bigamous marriage with her in AD 48. Informed of his wife's treachery, Claudius ordered them both put to death. Silius had been designated to hold the consulship in the following year.
- Aulus Licinius Nerva Silianus, grandson of Aulus Licinius Nerva Silianus, the consul of AD 7, was consul in AD 65.
- Silia, the wife of a senator, was party to the debauchery of Nero; but unable to avoid repeating what she had seen, she was sent into exile.
- Tiberius Catius Asconius Silius Italicus, consul in AD 68, had acquired some fame as an orator, and a member of the centumviri, and was the last surviving member of Nero's inner circle. He was a prolific writer of heroic verse, and the composer of the Punica, an account of the Second Punic War in seventeen books, and the longest surviving poem from antiquity written in Latin.
- Silius, a writer of satires in the time of Juvenal.
- Silius Proculus, a friend of Pliny the Younger, might be the same as the satirist mentioned by Juvenal.
- Lucius Silius Decianus, consul suffectus from the Kalends of September in AD 94.
- Silius Tertullus, a senator who served as curator of the colony of Tunisia.
- Marcus Silius Messala, consul suffectus for the months of May and June in AD 193, announced the deposition of Didius Julianus, and the accession of Septimius Severus. He was subsequently governor of Bithynia and Pontus. Either he or another senator of this name, perhaps his son, was put to death by Elagabalus in 218.

== See also ==
- List of Roman gentes

== Bibliography ==
- Gaius Julius Caesar, Commentarii de Bello Gallico (Commentaries on the Gallic War).
- Marcus Tullius Cicero, De Natura Deorum, Epistulae ad Atticum.
- Titus Livius (Livy), History of Rome.
- Fasti Capitolini, AE 1927, 101; 1940, 59, 60.
- Strabo, Geographica.
- Marcus Velleius Paterculus, Roman History.
- Lucius Annaeus Seneca (Seneca the Elder), Controversiae.
- Gaius Plinius Secundus (Pliny the Elder), Historia Naturalis (Natural History).
- Gaius Plinius Caecilius Secundus (Pliny the Younger), Epistulae (Letters).
- Sextus Julius Frontinus, De Aquaeductu (On Aqueducts).
- Decimus Junius Juvenalis, Satirae (Satires).
- Publius Cornelius Tacitus, Annales.
- Gaius Suetonius Tranquillus, De Vita Caesarum (Lives of the Caesars, or The Twelve Caesars).
- Fasti Ostienses, CIL XIV, 244.
- Sextus Pompeius Festus, Epitome de M. Verrio Flacco de Verborum Significatu (Epitome of Marcus Verrius Flaccus' On the Meaning of Words).
- Lucius Cassius Dio Cocceianus (Cassius Dio), Roman History.
- Philipp Eduard Huschke, De Causa Siliana, Rostock (1824); Studien des Römischen Rechts, Breslau (1830).
- Dictionary of Greek and Roman Biography and Mythology, William Smith, ed., Little, Brown and Company, Boston (1849).
- René Cagnat et alii, L'Année épigraphique (The Year in Epigraphy, abbreviated AE), Presses Universitaires de France (1888–present).
- George Davis Chase, "The Origin of Roman Praenomina", in Harvard Studies in Classical Philology, vol. VIII, pp. 103–184 (1897).
- Paul von Rohden, Elimar Klebs, & Hermann Dessau, Prosopographia Imperii Romani (The Prosopography of the Roman Empire, abbreviated PIR), Berlin (1898).
- T. Robert S. Broughton, The Magistrates of the Roman Republic, American Philological Association (1952–1986).
- Marjeta Šašel Kos, Inscriptiones Latinae in Graecia Repertae: Additamenta ad CIL III (Latin Inscriptions Discovered in Greece: Additions to CIL III), Fratelli Lega, Faenza (1979).
- Ronald Syme, The Augustan Aristocracy, Clarendon Press, Oxford (1989).
