= Mettius (praenomen) =

Latin name

Mettius /ˈmɛtiəs/ is a Latin praenomen, or personal name, which was used in pre-Roman times and perhaps during the early centuries of the Roman Republic, but which was obsolete by the 1st century BC. The feminine form is Mettia. The patronymic gens Mettia was derived from this praenomen. The name was rare in historical times, and not regularly abbreviated.

The praenomen Mettius is known primarily from two individuals who lived during the earliest period of Roman history. Mettius Curtius was a Sabine warrior who fought under Titus Tatius during the time of Romulus, the founder and first king of Rome. During a major battle, the Sabine champion narrowly escaped drowning in a swampy area. Mettius Fufetius was the commander of the Alban forces during the war between Rome and Alba Longa, during the reign of Tullus Hostilius, the third king of Rome. After the Albans were defeated, they became nominal allies of Rome. Hostilius had Fufetius brutally executed, and Rome's mother city razed, because he suspected the Alban commander of disloyalty.

As with other rare praenomina, Mettius may once have been more widespread amongst the plebeians, and in the countryside. Other than the Curtii and Fufetii, the name is known to have been used by the obscure gens Scuilia, and must once have been used by the ancestors of gens Mettia.

== Origin and Meaning of the Name ==
Because one of the two historical figures named Mettius was Sabine, while the other was Latin, the praenomen may have been an ancient one common to both the Latin and Oscan languages. Its meaning remains obscure; it was not mentioned by either Varro or Festus, and Chase has nothing to say about the name. Scullard equates the name with the Oscan word meddix, apparently a cognate of the Latin magister. If this is correct, then the name would belong to a class of praenomina including the Etruscan Arruns and Lars, which were derived from words meaning prince and lord, respectively.

Although known from only a handful of examples in Latin, the praenomen Mettius was borrowed by the Etruscans, in whose language it became Metie.
