= Manius Rabuleius =

5th-century BC Roman politician

Manius Rabuleius was an Ancient Roman politician and a member of the second decemvirate in 450 BC.

Dionysius of Halicarnassus calls him a patrician, whereas he speaks of Gaius Rabuleius as a plebeian. As no other persons of this name are mentioned by ancient writers, we have no means for determining whether the gens was patrician or plebeian.
