= Alliena gens =

Ancient Roman family

The gens Alliena or Aliena was a minor plebeian family of the Roman Republic. The first member of the gens to achieve prominence was Lucius Alienus, plebeian aedile in 454 BC. However, the family then slipped into obscurity for several centuries, emerging once more in the first century BC.

== Origin ==
The nomen Allienus belongs to a class of gentilicia formed using the suffix -enus, typically appearing in names formed from other gentilicia with stems ending in i. Despite its resemblance to the Latin adjective, alienus, "a stranger", the nomen does not seem to be Latin, but is frequently found in and around Picenum. As a personal cognomen in the Etruscan gens Caecinia, it may have been derived from the adjective.

== Praenomina ==
The main praenomina of the Allieni were Aulus, Gaius, Lucius, and Manius, of which the first three were common throughout all periods of Roman history, although Manius was more distinctive, favored by some families and avoided by most others, perhaps due to confusion with the Manes, the spirits of the dead. Some of the Allieni used other names, including Quintus, Tiberius, Titus, Marcus, and Publius, of which only Tiberius was relatively uncommon. Spurius, although it occurs in two filiations of this gens, probably does not represent the praenomen, which was falling out of use by the first century, but indicates that their fathers were unknown; as with Manius, this usage seems to be the result of confusion between the name and an unrelated word, spurius, meaning "illegitimate".

== Members ==
This list includes abbreviated praenomina. For an explanation of this practice, see filiation.

- Lucius Alienus, one of the plebeian aediles in 454 BC, accused Gaius Veturius Cicurinus, the consul of the preceding year, of misappropriating the spoils of war by selling them and diverting the profits to the Roman treasury.
- Aulus Alienus, built a family sepulchre at Rome, dating to the middle of the first century BC.
- Aulus Allienus, praetor in 49 BC, with Sicilia as his province, and later served as proconsul in Africa under Caesar. A legate of Publius Cornelius Dolabella in 43 BC, he was sent to Egypt, in order to return with four legions stationed there, and on his return joined his forces to those of Gaius Cassius Longinus, in command of eight legions.
- Aulus Allienus Cerdo, buried at Rome in the latter half of the first century BC, along with Alliena Chreste and Cocceia Fausta.
- Alliena Chreste, buried at Rome in the latter half of the first century BC, along with Aulus Allienus Cerdo and Cocceia Fausta.
- Lucius Allienus M. f., buried at Bovianum Undecimanorum in Samnium, in a tomb dating from the latter half of the first century BC, or the early first century AD, along with his mother, Pontidia.
- Aulus Allienus Charito, buried at Brundisium in Calabria, in a tomb dating from the late first century BC, or the early first century AD.
- Aulus Allienus Primus, made a donation at Vibinum in Apulia, dating from the reign of Augustus. He was probably the father of Aulus Allienus Laetus, as the two are mentioned together in two inscriptions.
- Aulus Allienus A. f. Laetus, a praefectus fabrum, or engineering foreman, at Vibinum, according to an inscription dating from the end of the first century BC, or the early first century AD. The same inscriptions mention Aulus Allienus Primus, perhaps his father.
- Alliena, the mistress of Nicomedes, a young slave buried at Rome, aged four, in a tomb dating from the first half of the first century.
- Allienus, buried at Fulginiae in Umbria, in a tomb built by his wife and client, Romanilla, and dating from the first half of the first century.
- Lucius Allienus, a native of Sardinia, and veteran of the Legio VI, (Note: It's unclear from the inscription whether this was the Legio VI Victrix or the Legio VI Ferrata, but perhaps the latter, since a colony of its veterans was established in Illyricum after the Battle of Actium, while the other was stationed in Spain.) buried at Ateste in Venetia and Histria, aged twenty-five, in a tomb dating from the first half of the first century.
- Aulus Allienus Alexander, named in an inscription from Rome, dating from the first half of the first century.
- Manius Allienus M'. l. Antiochus, a freedman named in a sepulchral inscription from Rome, dating from the first half of the first century, along with the freedwoman Alliena Daphnis, Manius Allienus Romanus, and two children of the same family.
- Quintus Allienus Q. l. Chresimus, a freedman named in an inscription belonging to the family sepulchre of the duumvir Lucius Magneius Niger at Frusino in Latium, dating to the first half of the first century.
- Alliena M'. l. Daphnis, a freedwoman named in a sepulchral inscription from Rome, dating from the first half of the first century, along with the freedman Manius Allienus Antiochus, Manius Allienus Romanus, and two children of the same family.
- Aulus Allienus A. l. Eunomus, a freedman buried at Rome, in a tomb dating from the first half of the first century.
- Alliena G[...], named in a sepulchral inscription at Rome, dating from the first half of the first century, as the sister of Thall[...] Mar[...].
- Manius Allienus Sp. f. Romanus, buried at Rome, aged twenty-two, in a sepulchre dating from the first half of the first century, along with a girl, aged seven, and a boy also named Manius Allienus Romanus, aged eleven. The inscription also names the freedman, Manius Allienus Antiochus and the freedwoman Alliena Daphnis, whose former master had been named Manius.
- Manius Allienus Sp. f. Romanus, a boy buried at Rome, aged eleven, in a family sepulchre dating from the first half of the first century, along with a young man of the same name, aged twenty-two, and a girl aged seven. The inscription also names the freedman, Manius Allienus Antiochus and the freedwoman Alliena Daphnis, whose former master had been named Manius.
- Aulus Allienus, named in an inscription honouring Tiberius at Brundisium, dating from AD 33.
- Aulus Allienus A. l. Priamus, donated a pedestal to Fortuna at Rome, dating from the early or middle part of the first century.
- Allienus, a child buried in a first century tomb at Rome.
- Gaius Allienus Epigonus, a soldier serving in the century of Gaius Cornelius Successus at Rome in AD 70.
- Gaius Allienus Felix Major, a soldier serving in the century of Tiberius Julius Primigenius at Rome in AD 70. His name is recorded in an inscription, followed by that of Gaius Allienus Felix Minor, likely his son, apparently deceased.
- Gaius Allienus Felix Minor, a deceased soldier who had served in the century of Tiberius Julius Primigenius at Rome in AD 70. His name is recorded in an inscription, preceded by that of Gaius Allienus Felix Major, likely his father.
- Tiberius Alienus Caecina, the owner of a house in Rome for which lead piping, dating from the middle or late first century, was made by Tiberius Claudius Felix.
- Lucius Allienus A. f. Falerna Basus, named in a late first-century inscription from Rome.
- Tiberius Allienus Sicinius Quintianus, tribune of the plebs in AD 98.
- Tiberius Allienus Philippus, buried in a first- or second-century tomb at Rome, along with his wife, Herennia Lacaena, and other members of the Herennia gens.
- Allienus Proculus, a potter whose maker's mark has been found at Ostia in Latium, dating to AD 113.
- Manius Allienus, named in pottery stamps found at Rome, dating from AD 123; perhaps to be identified with Manius Allienus Charito, whose pottery stamps are undated.
- Aliena T. f. Berenice, buried in a second-century tomb at Firmum Picenum in Picenum, dedicated by her husband and son, both named Gaius Vettius Polus.
- Gaius Allienus Pudens, buried at Rome, together with his son, Pudens, in a tomb dedicated by his wife, Alliena Successa, dating between the middle of the second century and the middle of the third.
- Gaius Allienus C. f. Pudens, buried at Rome with his father, also named Gaius Allienus Pudens, in a tomb built by his mother, Alliena Successa, dating between the middle of the second century and the middle of the third.

=== Undated Allieni ===
- Gaius Allienus C. f., buried at Tibur in Latium, along with Aulia Rufa.
- Gaius Allienus T. f., a centurion buried at Tuder in Umbria.
- Manius Allienus Charito, named in pottery stamps found at Rome.
- Quintus Allienus Ɔ. l. Felix, a freedman named in an inscription from Rome.
- Gaius Alienus Maturus, named in an inscription from Augustonemetum in Aquitania.
- Aulus Allienus Niceros, a little boy buried at Rome, aged two years, thirty days.
- Quintus Allienus Pef[...], named in an inscription from Ariminum in Picenum, along with his mother, Caeeidia, identifying them as Picentes.
- Marcus Allienus Peregrinus, named in a bronze inscription from Neapolis in Campania.
- Gaius Alienus Primigenius, named in an inscription from Tuder.
- Allienus Proclus, the owner of an estate at Rome, according to several pottery stamps.
- Lucius Allienus Speratus, buried at Rome.
- Publius Allienus P. f. Victor, a centurion in the Legio IV Flavia Felix, dedicated a tomb at Rome for his mother, Maria Decimina.

== See also ==
- List of Roman gentes
- Aulus Caecina Alienus – 1st century AD Roman general

== Bibliography ==
- Marcus Tullius Cicero, Epistulae ad Atticum, Epistulae ad Familiares, Epistulae ad Quintum Fratrem, Philippicae.
- Aulus Hirtius (attributed), De Bello Africo (On the African War).
- Dionysius of Halicarnassus, Romaike Archaiologia (Roman Antiquities).
- Titus Livius (Livy), History of Rome.
- Appianus Alexandrinus (Appian), Bellum Civile (The Civil War).
- Dictionary of Greek and Roman Biography and Mythology, William Smith, ed., Little, Brown and Company, Boston (1849).
- Theodor Mommsen et alii, Corpus Inscriptionum Latinarum (The Body of Latin Inscriptions, abbreviated CIL), Berlin-Brandenburgische Akademie der Wissenschaften (1853–present).
- Wilhelm Henzen, Ephemeris Epigraphica: Corporis Inscriptionum Latinarum Supplementum (Journal of Inscriptions: Supplement to the Corpus Inscriptionum Latinarum), Institute of Roman Archaeology, Rome (1872–1913).
- René Cagnat et alii, L'Année épigraphique (The Year in Epigraphy, abbreviated AE), Presses Universitaires de France (1888–present).
- George Davis Chase, "The Origin of Roman Praenomina", in Harvard Studies in Classical Philology, vol. VIII, pp. 103–184 (1897).
- T. Robert S. Broughton, The Magistrates of the Roman Republic, American Philological Association (1952–1986).
- Bollettino della reale Deputazione di Storia patria per l'Umbria (Bulletin of the Royal Deputation for the History of the Fatherland of Umbria).
- Steven L. Tuck, Latin Inscriptions in the Kelsey Museum: The Dennison and De Criscio Collections, Ann Arbor (2005).
