= Monte Cavo =

Volcanic mountain in Italy

Alban Mount
- Monte Cavo
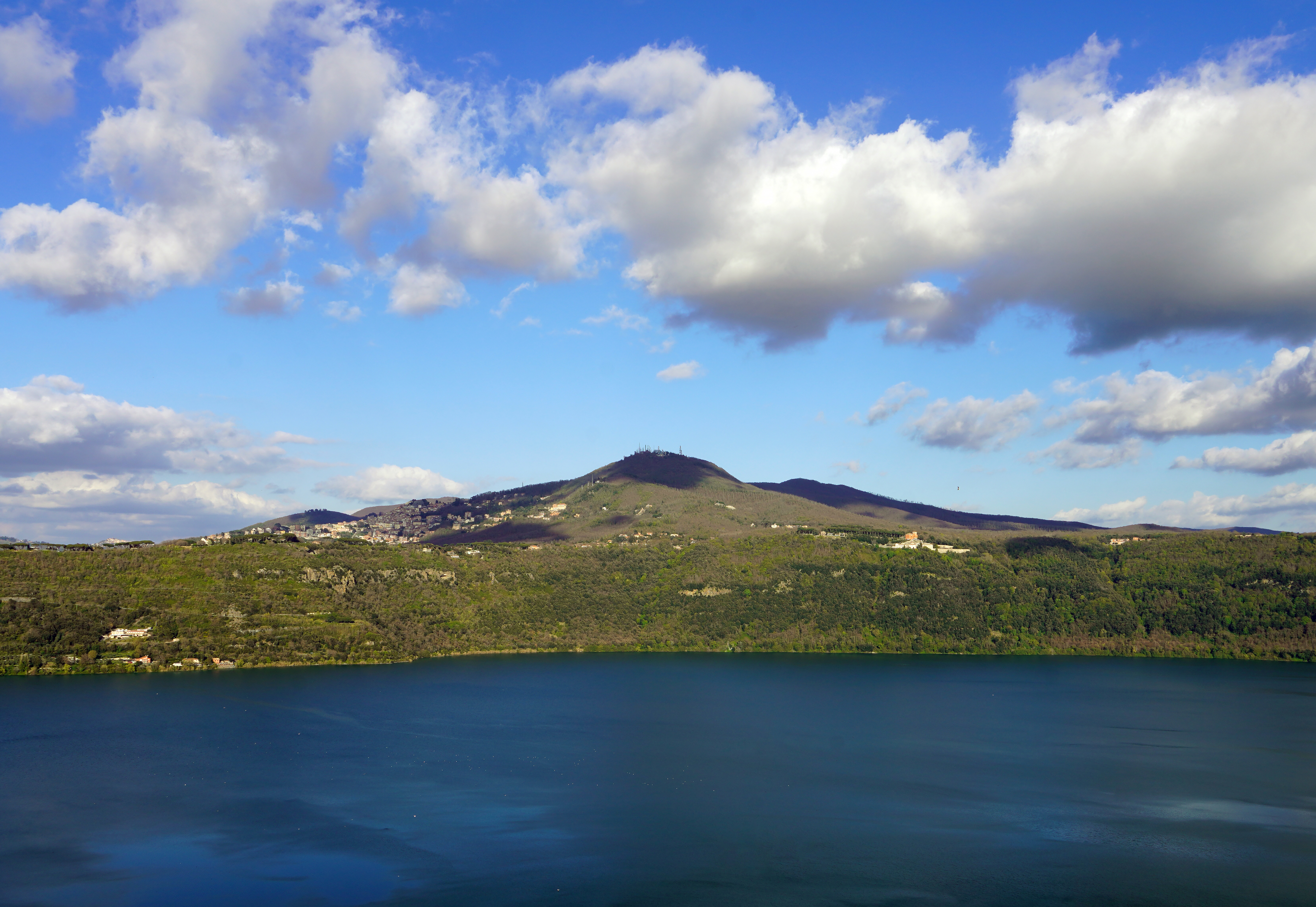
- Monte Cavo.

Highest point
- Elevation: 950 m (3,120 ft)
- Prominence: 84 m (276 ft)

Geography
- Location: East of Rome, Italy
- Parent range: Colli Albani

Geology
- Mountain type: Pyroclastic cone

Monte Cavo, or less often, Monte Albano, is the second highest mountain of the Alban Hills complex, near Rome, Italy. An old volcano extinguished around 10,000 years ago, it lies about 20 km (12 mi) from the sea, in the territory of the comune of Rocca di Papa. It is the dominant peak of the Alban Hills. The current name comes from Cabum, an Italic settlement existing on this mountain.

Volcanic activity under King Tullus Hostilius on the site was reported by Livy in his book of Roman history: "...there had been a shower of stones on the Alban Mount...".

== Jupiter Latiaris ==
Monte Cavo is the sacred Mons Albanus of the Italic people of ancient Italy who lived in Alba Longa (the Albani), and other cities, and therefore a sacred mountain to the Romans; there they built the temple of Jove (Jupiter) Latiaris, one of the most important destinations of pilgrimage for all Latin people in the centuries of Roman domination.

On the Mons Albanus, between January and March, the "Latin Festivals" were held. The newly chosen Consuls had to sacrifice to Jupiter Latiaris and to announce the Latin Holidays. When the Consul obtained a victory in war he also had to celebrate the triumph on the Alban Mount. Each year the temple hosted the Feriae Latinae, which lasted for four days and were attended by the representatives of 47 cities (30 Latin and 17 Federate).

In 531 BC, King Tarquinius Superbus built here a temple shared with the Latins, the Hernici and the Volsci, where every year celebrations in honor of Jupiter Latiaris were held. In return, Jupiter Latiaris conferred upon whoever was elected head of the Latin confederation, the power of dictator latinus. A triumphal procession along this sacred way left the Appian Way at Ariccia and climbed up 450 m to the hillside. More than 5 km of this way is well preserved through the woods.

== Ancient temple, hermitage, hotel, station ==
Hotel Monte Cavo at the beginning of the 20th century.

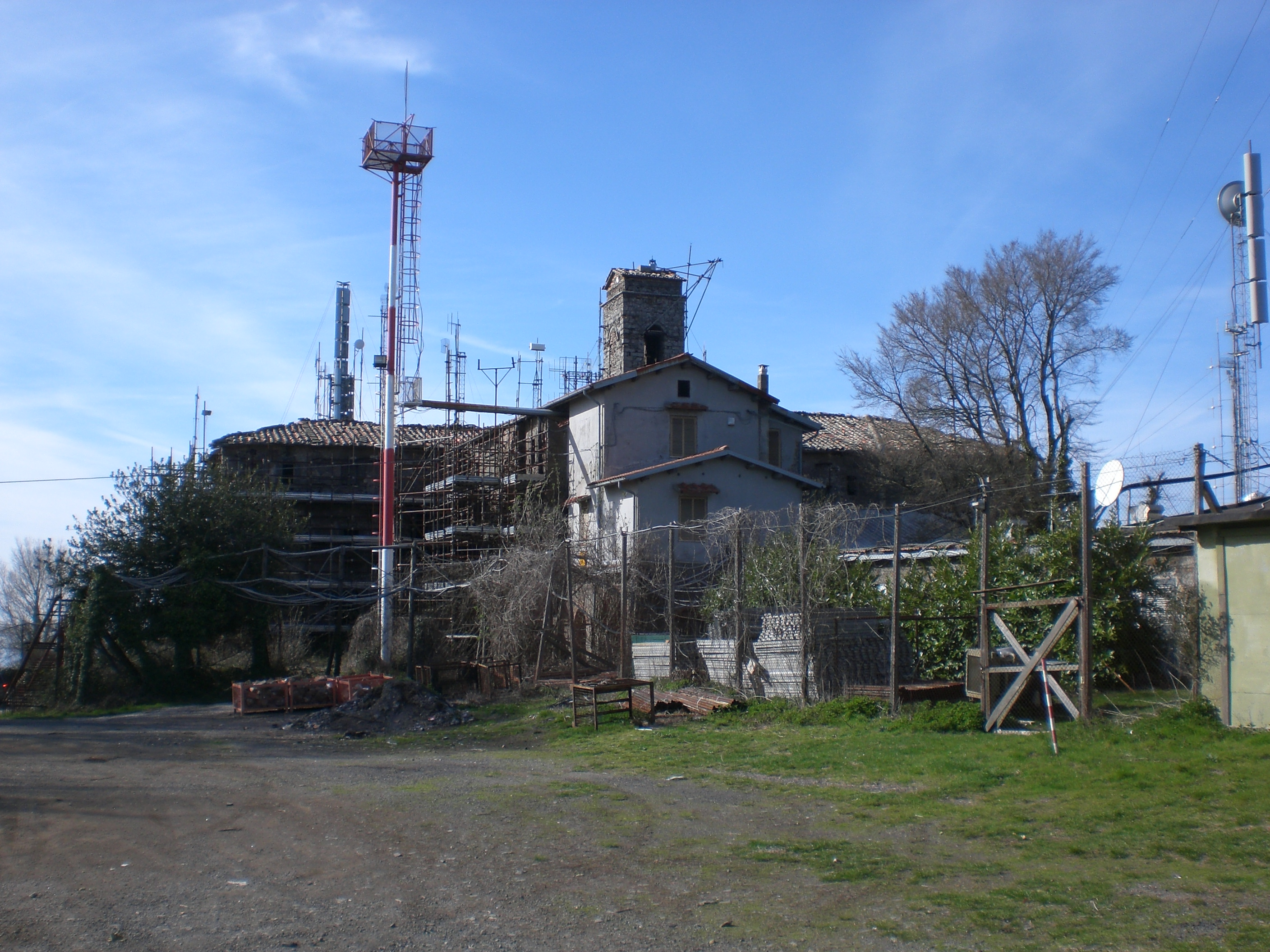
The same structure used as a telecommunications station at the end of the 20th century.

In the Early Middle Ages the temple of Iuppiter Latiaris was replaced by a hermitage devoted to Saint Peter, built by a Dalmatian hermit. It was visited by Pope Pius II in 1463, and subsequently by Pope Alexander VII. After the Dalmatian hermits the Polish religious order of Edmondo of Buisson was established there, then the Trinitarian Spaniards, and finally the Flemish Missionaries.

The hermitage was converted to a monastery in 1727. The Passionists came in 1758 and restored it in 1783, using the materials of the temple of Jupiter, as found and raised by Henry Benedict Stuart, Duke of York, bishop of Frascati.

During this period there were guests in the monastery: the king Francis II of Naples in 1865 and Pope Pius IX in 1867. The "contemplative-missionaries" abandoned the monastery in 1889.

In 1890 the structure was converted to a hotel that entertained national and international personalities, among others: Umberto II of Italy, Massimo d'Azeglio, Luigi Pirandello, Armando Diaz (who sojourned in Rocca di Papa and was remembered with a commemorative headstone mail in the residence on De Rossi palace) and the former King Edward VIII with his wife Wallis Simpson.

From 1942 the hotel was used as military base for radio communications by the German Wehrmacht. On June 3, 1944, soldiers of 142nd Regiment-36th Infantry Division (United States) ("Texas" Division), attacked and captured the military site—with 20 enemy soldiers killed and 30 prisoners taken.

== Bibliography ==
- Strabo - Geographica (Strabo) book V chapter 3 - Rome 20 BC
- Georges Dumézil, Archaic Roman Religion ISBN 0-8018-5481-4
- T.J. Cornell - The beginnings of Rome: Italy and Rome from the Bronze Age to Punic War - London 1995 - ISBN 0-415-01596-0
- Livy: Ab urbe condita Book I cap. 31 -Ab Urbe Condita (Latin)
- Dionysius of Halicarnassus: The Roman Antiquities
