= Arennia gens =

Ancient Roman plebeian family

The gens Arennia was a plebeian family at Rome during the period of the Punic Wars. It is known chiefly from two individuals, probably brothers, who held the office of tribune of the plebs in 210 BC, during the War with Hannibal.

== Members ==
- Gaius Arennius, tribune of the plebs in 210 BC.
- Lucius Arennius, tribune of the plebs in 210 BC, and prefect of the allies in 208, was taken prisoner in the battle in which Marcellus was defeated by Hannibal.

== See also ==
- List of Roman gentes
