= Maelia gens =

Ancient Roman family

The gens Maelia was a plebeian family at ancient Rome. Members of this gens are mentioned in the time of the early Republic, from just after the decemvirs down to the Samnite Wars. The Maelii belonged to the equestrian order, and were among the wealthiest of the plebeians. The most famous of the Maelii was probably Spurius Maelius, a wealthy merchant who purchased grain from the Etruscans during a famine in 440 BC, and sold it to the poor at a nominal price. The following year, the patricians accused him of conspiring to make himself king, and when he resisted arrest he was slain by the magister equitum, Gaius Servilius Ahala.

== Praenomina ==
The Maelii mentioned in the early history of the Republic used the praenomina Spurius, Gaius, Publius, and Quintus. All were common names during this period, although Spurius was less common in the later Republic, and vanished altogether in early imperial times.

== Branches and cognomina ==
The only surname associated with the Maelii was Capitolinus, indicating that this branch of the family lived on the Capitoline Hill.

== Members ==
This list includes abbreviated praenomina. For an explanation of this practice, see filiation.

- Spurius Maelius, a wealthy grain merchant, accused of treason and slain without trial in 439 BC. Although his guilt was universally accepted in antiquity, modern historians doubt that there is any truth to the charge. Niebuhr suggests that his goal was to obtain the consulship for himself, and open the magistracy to the plebeians. None of Maelius' supposed accomplices were tried or punished, but his slayer, Ahala, went into exile rather than face trial. (Note: Ahala's justification for slaying Maelius was that he had refused the dictator's summons; a Roman dictator held the power of life and death, symbolized by the axes in his lictor's fasces, which were not removed even within the sacred boundary of Rome. But the Lex Valeria Horatia, passed after the abolition of the decemvirs, only ten years before Maelius' summary execution, assured Roman citizens the right of appeal, even from a dictator. The dictator could summon Maelius to appear and account for his actions, but he could not have him put to death without a trial before the comitia centuriata. This illegal act may be considered strong evidence that the charge of treason could not be proved. Furthermore, the only occasion for appointing a dictator had been Maelius' alleged conspiracy. The facts that Ahala might be brought to trial for his actions as magister equitum, and that he expected to be condemned for Maelius' murder, and chose exile rather than face trial, are also strong evidence in Maelius' favour.)
- Spurius Maelius, tribune of the plebs in 436 BC, he sought to confiscate the property of Ahala, the magister equitum who had slain his kinsman, but his bill was defeated. His relationship to the dead grain merchant is unknown.
- Gaius Maelius S. f. (Capitolinus), father of the consular tribune.
- Publius Maelius C. f. S. n. Capitolinus, one of the consular tribunes in 400 and 396 BC. Livy describes him as one of the first plebeians to hold this magistracy in the former year, although it is likely that some of the consular tribunes of 444 and 422 had been plebeians.
- Quintus Maelius, tribune of the plebs in 320 BC, urged the Romans to keep the peace they had been granted by the Samnites after the disaster of the Caudine Forks. Maelius had been an officer in the army that surrendered to the Samnites, and was released on the condition that all of the magistrates, including the plebeian tribunes, should become hostages of the Samintes after delivering their report to Rome. Maelius was one of the magistrates who willingly accepted this fate, but the Samnites refused the hostages, suspecting them to be a pretext for renewing the war. (Note: It was not customary for the tribunes of the plebs to leave Rome during their year of office, since they could only perform their duty within the city and a short distance beyond the walls. Niebuhr discusses the reason why Maelius might have accompanied the army.)

== See also ==
- List of Roman gentes

== Bibliography ==
- Marcus Tullius Cicero, Laelius sive de Amicitia, Cato Maior de Senectute, In Catilinam, De Republica, Philippicae, Pro Milone, De Domo Sua, De Officiis.
- Titus Livius (Livy), Ab Urbe Condita (History of Rome).
- Dionysius of Halicarnassus, Romaike Archaiologia.
- Valerius Maximus, Factorum ac Dictorum Memorabilium (Memorable Facts and Sayings).
- Joannes Zonaras, Epitome Historiarum (Epitome of History).
- Angelo Mai (Angelus Maius), Scriptorum Veterum Nova Collectio, e Vaticanus Codicibus Edita (New Collection of Ancient Writers, Compiled from the Vatican Collection), Vatican Press, Rome (1825–1838).
- Barthold Georg Niebuhr, The History of Rome, Julius Charles Hare and Connop Thirlwall, trans., John Smith, Cambridge (1828).
- Dictionary of Greek and Roman Biography and Mythology, William Smith, ed., Little, Brown and Company, Boston (1849).
- T. Robert S. Broughton, The Magistrates of the Roman Republic, American Philological Association (1952).
