= Numitoria gens =

Ancient Roman family

The gens Numitoria was an ancient but minor plebeian family at ancient Rome. The first member of this gens to appear in history was Lucius Numitorius, elected tribune of the plebs in 472 BC. Although Numitorii are found down to the final century of the Republic, none of them ever held any of the higher magistracies.

== Origin ==
The nomen Numitorius is a patronymic surname, based on the name Numitor, traditionally remembered as the name of the grandfather of Romulus and Remus, and the last of the Silvan kings of Alba Longa. Chase considers this to have been a genuine name from Latium's archaic past, signifying one who "arranges" or "orders". (Note: Chase describes Numitor as a cognomen, although in unraveling the distant Roman past, it is sometimes difficult to establish whether a particular name should be considered a praenomen or a cognomen.)

== Branches and cognomina ==
The only surname occurring among the Numitorii of the Republic is Pullus, meaning "dark" or "black".

== Members ==
This list includes abbreviated praenomina. For an explanation of this practice, see filiation.

- Lucius Numitorius, elected tribune of the plebs in 470 BC, the first year in which the tribunes were elected by the comitia tributa.
- Numitoria, wife of the centurion Lucius Verginius, and the mother of Verginia.
- Publius Numitorius, the uncle of Verginia, opposed the schemes of Appius Claudius Crassus, and after the downfall of the decemvirs in 449 BC, was elected tribune of the plebs. He accused the decemvir Spurius Oppius Cornicen of cruelly beating an old soldier, resulting in Oppius' condemnation and execution.
- Gaius Numitorius, triumvir monetalis in 133 BC.
- Quintus Numitorius Pullus, a native of Fregellae, which revolted in 125 BC, demanding Roman citizenship. Numitorius betrayed the Fregellates to the praetor Lucius Opimius, who captured and destroyed the town. His daughter was the first wife of Marcus Antonius Creticus.
- Gaius Numitorius C. l., a freedman named on an inscription in Praeneste dated circa 130–101 BC.
- Aulus Numitorius C. l., a freedman named on an inscription in Delos dated 110 or 109 BC.
- Gaius Numitorius A. l., a freedman named on an inscription in Delos dated 110 or 109 BC.
- Gaius Numitorius C. f., a senator in 101 BC, (Note: Classical scholars (Broughton, Syme, etc.) used to agree on the date of 129 BC for the Senatus Consultum De Agro Pergameno, where this name is found. However, more recent academics tends to follow Mattingly who asserted a date of 101 BC.) son of Gaius Numitorius, the moneyer of 133. He was killed by partisans of Marius and Cinna in 87 and his body was then dragged through the Forum.
- Publius Numitorius Hilarus, whose funeral relief is in the Museum of Terme, Rome
- Numitoria Q. f., the first wife of Marcus Antonius Creticus.
- Gaius Numitorius, an eques who testified against Verres.
- Numitorius, the publisher of Vergil's Eclogues.
- Gaius Numitorius Asclepiades (Rome).

== See also ==
- List of Roman gentes

== Bibliography ==
- Marcus Tullius Cicero, De Inventione, In Verrem, Philippicae.
- Publius Vergilius Maro (Vergil), Eclogues (Bucolics).
- Titus Livius (Livy), Ab Urbe Condita (History of Rome).
- Dionysius of Halicarnassus, Romaike Archaiologia.
- Marcus Velleius Paterculus, Compendium of Roman History.
- Lucius Annaeus Florus, Epitome de T. Livio Bellorum Omnium Annorum DCC (Epitome of Livy: All the Wars of Seven Hundred Years).
- Appianus Alexandrinus (Appian), Bellum Civile (The Civil War).
- Cassius Dio, Roman History.
- Dictionary of Greek and Roman Biography and Mythology, William Smith, ed., Little, Brown and Company, Boston (1849).
- George Davis Chase, "The Origin of Roman Praenomina", in Harvard Studies in Classical Philology, vol. VIII (1897).
- Paul von Rohden, Elimar Klebs, & Hermann Dessau, Prosopographia Imperii Romani (The Prosopography of the Roman Empire, abbreviated PIR), Berlin (1898).
- T. Robert S. Broughton, The Magistrates of the Roman Republic, American Philological Association (1952).
- Robert K. Sherk, "The Text of the Senatus Consultum De Agro Pergameno", in Greek, Roman, and Byzantine Studies, vol. 7, pp. 361–369 (1966).
- Harold B. Mattingly, "The Date of the Senatus Consultum De Agro Pergameno", in The American Journal of Philology, Vol. 93, No. 3 (Jul., 1972), pp. 412–423.
- Michael Crawford, Roman Republican Coinage, Cambridge University Press (1974, 2001).
- John C. Traupman, The New College Latin & English Dictionary, Bantam Books, New York (1995).
