= Trebonia gens =

Ancient Roman family

The gens Trebonia, rarely Terebonia, was a plebeian family at ancient Rome. Members of this gens are mentioned in the first century of the Republic, and regularly throughout Roman history, but none of them attained the consulship until the time of Caesar.

== Origin ==
The nomen Trebonius belongs to a large class of gentilicia formed using the suffix -onius, originally applied to cognomina ending in -o, but later used as a regular gentile-forming suffix, and applied in cases for which there was no morphological justification. These gentes were largely plebeian, and the form Terebonius strongly hints at an Oscan origin.

== Branches and cognomina ==
The Trebonii of the Republic bore no hereditary surnames, but a few had personal cognomina, such as Asper, bestowed upon Lucius Trebonius, the plebeian tribune of 448 BC. Translating "rough, harsh, rude", or "annoying", this surname alluded to Trebonius' determined pursuit of reforms favouring the plebeians.

== Members ==
This list includes abbreviated praenomina. For an explanation of this practice, see filiation.

- Lucius Trebonius, surnamed Asper, as tribune of the plebs in 448 BC, carried a law, the lex Trebonia, requiring that the comitia should not be dismissed until the full complement of ten plebeian tribunes had been elected. Prior to this, vacancies were filled by co-optation, leaving the office open to political influence, which had resulted in two patricians being chosen as tribunes of the plebs in the previous year.
- Gnaeus Trebonius, tribune of the plebs in 401 BC, opposed the co-optation of two of his colleagues, in violation of the lex Trebonia. Though unsuccessful in this regard, the plebeian tribunes of this year did pass an agrarian law.
- Marcus Trebonius, consular tribune in 383 BC.
- Publius Trebonius, listed by Diodorus Siculus among the consular tribunes of 379 BC. His inclusion is doubtful, as he is not mentioned by Livy, who lists six consular tribunes, while Diodorus gives eight; there were no more than six in any other year.
- Titus Trebonius, a legate serving under the consul Lucius Papirius Cursor in 293 BC, during the Third Samnite War. He led the Roman cavalry at Aquilonia, where the consul won a significant victory.
- Trebonius, a subordinate of Gaius Lusius, the nephew of Marius, during the Cimbric War. When his efforts at seduction failed, Lusius attempted to force himself on Trebonius, who slew him. On hearing Trebonius' defense, Marius acquitted him of his nephew's murder, and honoured him.
- Aulus Trebonius, mentioned by Cicero among those whom Sulla had proscribed.
- Publius Trebonius, made a will in favour of his brother, Aulus, who had been proscribed by Sulla, only to have the will set aside by Verres, the corrupt governor of Sicily.
- Gaius Trebonius, an eques, and the father of Gaius Trebonius, the consul.
- Gaius Trebonius C. f., the consul and tyrannicide, as quaestor in 60 BC, opposed the adoption of Publius Clodius Pulcher by a plebeian. As tribune of the plebs in 55, he passed the lex Trebonia granting proconsular commands to Pompeius and Crassus, and extending Caesar's command in Gaul for another five years. He became a trusted lieutenant of Caesar, by whose favour he became consul suffectus in October of 45. He was one of the chief conspirators against Caesar in the following year, for which he was highly praised by Cicero. Trebonius was murdered by Publius Cornelius Dolabella in 43.
- Trebonius, an obscure person whose adultery was mentioned by Horace.
- Trebonius Garutianus or Garucianus, a procurator ordered by Galba to put Lucius Clodius Macer, the governor of Africa, to death. Macer had revolted against Nero with Galba's encouragement, but the extent to which he armed himself raised suspicion that Macer intended to lay claim to the empire.
- Trebonius Rufinus, one of the municipal decemviri at Vienna in Gallia Lugdunensis, was a friend of Pliny the Younger.
- Publius Trebonius, consul suffectus in AD 53, serving from the Kalends of July, possibly through the end of October.
- Gaius Trebonius Proculus Mettius Modestus, consul suffectus in AD 103, seems to have belonged to the Mettia gens; he may have been adopted by a Gaius Trebonius Proculus, or perhaps that was the name of his maternal grandfather.
- Appius Annius Trebonius Gallus, consul in AD 108, was really a member of the Annia gens, but through his mother was probably the grandson of Publius Trebonius, the consul of AD 53.

== See also ==
- List of Roman gentes
- Trebonianus Gallus, Roman emperor

== Bibliography ==
- Marcus Tullius Cicero, Epistulae ad Atticum, Epistulae ad Familiares, In Verrem, Philippicae, Pro Milone.
- Gaius Julius Caesar, Commentarii de Bello Gallico (Commentaries on the Gallic War), Commentarii de Bello Civili (Commentaries on the Civil War).
- Diodorus Siculus, Bibliotheca Historica (Library of History).
- Dionysius of Halicarnassus, Romaike Archaiologia.
- Titus Livius (Livy), History of Rome.
- Valerius Maximus, Factorum ac Dictorum Memorabilium (Memorable Facts and Sayings).
- Gaius Plinius Caecilius Secundus (Pliny the Younger), Epistulae (Letters).
- Publius Cornelius Tacitus, Historiae.
- Lucius Mestrius Plutarchus (Plutarch), Lives of the Noble Greeks and Romans.
- Appianus Alexandrinus (Appian), Bellum Civile (The Civil War).
- Lucius Cassius Dio Cocceianus (Cassius Dio), Roman History.
- Scholia Bobiensia (Bobbio Scholiast), In Ciceronis Pro Milone (Commentary on Cicero's Oration Pro Milone).
- Dictionary of Greek and Roman Biography and Mythology, William Smith, ed., Little, Brown and Company, Boston (1849).
- George Davis Chase, "The Origin of Roman Praenomina", in Harvard Studies in Classical Philology, vol. VIII, pp. 103–184 (1897).
- T. Robert S. Broughton, The Magistrates of the Roman Republic, American Philological Association (1952–1986).
- Paul A. Gallivan, "The Fasti for the Reign of Claudius", in Classical Quarterly, vol. 28, pp. 407–426 (1978).
- John C. Traupman, The New College Latin & English Dictionary, Bantam Books, New York (1995).
