= Aulus Allienus =

Aulus Allienus was the name of two ancient Romans who lived roughly around the 1st century BC, and who may have been the same person:

- Aulus Allienus was a politician and general of ancient Rome. He was a friend of Cicero's, who spoke of him in high terms. He was the legate of Cicero's brother Quintus Tullius Cicero in the Roman province of Asia in 60 BC, and praetor in 49. In the following year, he had the province of Sicilia, and sent to Julius Caesar, who was then in the province of Africa, a large body of troops. He continued in Sicilia until 47, and received the title of proconsul. Two of Cicero's letters are addressed to him. His name occurs on a coin, which has on one side C. CAES. IMP. COS. ITER., and on the other A. ALLIENVS PROCOS.
- Aulus Allienus was a Roman politician who in 43 BC was sent by the general Publius Cornelius Dolabella to bring to him the legions which were in the Roman province of Egypt. On his return from Egypt with four legions, he was surprised by Cassius Longinus in Judea, who was at the head of eight legions. As he was outnumbered, Allienus joined Cassius. This Allienus may be the same person as the one listed above.

== See also ==
- Aliena gens
- Aulus Caecina Alienus
