= Lucius Alienus =

5th-century BC Roman official

Lucius Alienus was a citizen of ancient Rome who served as plebeian aedile in 454 BC. According to the Roman historian Livy, he accused Gaius Veturius Cicurinus, the consul of the previous year, of illegally selling the plunder gained in war (instead of distributing it among the soldiery), and placing the amount in the Aerarium. The prosecution was successful and Veturius was fined 15,000 asses.

Some writers have called into question the historical accuracy of this anecdote, as aediles are not generally thought to have had prosecutorial power as early as 454.

== See also ==
- Aliena gens
