= Icilia gens =

Ancient Roman family

The gens Icilia was a plebeian family at ancient Rome. During the early Republic, the Icilii were distinguished by their unwavering support for the rights of the plebeians against the patrician aristocracy.

== Branches and cognomina ==
The only surname of the early Icilii was Ruga, which properly belonged to many of the Icilii, but they are usually mentioned without a cognomen.

== Members ==
This list includes abbreviated praenomina. For an explanation of this practice, see filiation.

- Spurius Icilius, one of the plebeian envoys sent to negotiate with the Senate during the first secession of the plebeians, in 494 BC. He was elected tribune of the plebs for BC 493, plebeian aedile the following year, was probably tribune again in 481, and a third time in 470. (Note: Livy gives Spurius Licinius as the name of the tribune of 481; but Spurius was not a regular praenomen of the Licinii. Dionysius gives Sicilius, which should apparently be read as S. Icilius.)
- Gaius Icilius Ruga, one of the first plebeian tribunes, in 493 BC.
- Lucius Icilius S. f., tribune of the plebs in 456 and 455, carried a law assigning the Aventine Hill to the plebeians, and attempted to pass an agrarian law, which was blocked. In 449, he played a key role in the deposition of the decemvirs, and was again elected tribune of the plebs.
- Icilius S. f., brother of the tribune of 456, informed Lucius Verginius of the plot against his daughter during the second decemvirate, 449 BC.
- Lucius Icilius, tribune of the plebs in 412 BC. He was probably one of three brothers who held the tribuneship in 409, when his college succeeded in winning the election of the first plebeian quaestors.
- Icilius, one of three brothers who served as tribune of the plebs in BC 409.
- Icilius, last of the three brothers who were tribunes of the people in 409 BC.

== See also ==
- List of Roman gentes

== Bibliography ==
- Titus Livius (Livy), History of Rome.
- Dionysius of Halicarnassus, Romaike Archaiologia (Roman Antiquities).
- Dictionary of Greek and Roman Biography and Mythology, William Smith, ed., Little, Brown and Company, Boston (1849).
- T. Robert S. Broughton, The Magistrates of the Roman Republic, American Philological Association (1952).
