= Harriet Silius =

Finnish women's studies academic (born 1948)

Harriet Margareta Silius (born 25 January 1948) is a Finnish professor of women's studies.

In 1994 she became Director of the Institute of Women's Studies at Åbo Akademi University. From 1996 to 1999 she was editor of the Nordic Journal of Women's Studies.
