= Curiatia gens =

Ancient Roman family

The gens Curiatia was a distinguished family at Rome, with both patrician and plebeian branches. Members of this gens are mentioned in connection with the reign of Tullus Hostilius, the third King of Rome, during the seventh century BC. The first of the Curiatii to attain any significant office was Publius Curiatius Fistus, surnamed Trigeminus, who held the consulship in 453 BC. The gens continued to exist throughout the Republic, and perhaps into imperial times, but seldom did its members achieve any prominence.

== Origin ==
The existence of a patrician gens of this name is attested by Livius, who expressly mentions the Curiatii among the noble Alban gentes, which, after the destruction of Alba, were transplanted to Rome, and there received among the Patres. This opinion is not contradicted by the fact that in BC 401 and 138 we meet with Curiatii who were tribunes of the people and consequently plebeians, for this phenomenon may be accounted for here, as in other cases, by the supposition that the plebeian Curiatii were the descendants of freedmen of the patrician Curiatii, or that some members of the patrician gens had gone over to the plebeians.

The Alban origin of the Curiatii is also stated in the story about the three Curiatii who, in the reign of Tullus Hostilius, fought with the three Roman brothers, the Horatii, and were conquered by the cunning and bravery of one of the Horatii, though some writers described the Curiatii as Romans and the Horatii as Albans.

== Branches and cognomina ==
The only cognomen of the gens in the times of the Republic is Fistus. The consul of 453 bore the additional surname Trigeminus, alluding to the legend of the three Curiatii; the name can best be translated as "triplet." This name appears to have been passed down through the family, although whether its use was confined to the patrician family or shared by both branches is unclear.

== Members ==
- Publius Curiatius Fistus, surnamed Trigeminus, consul in 453 BC, and a member of the first decemvirate in 451.
- Publius Curiatius, tribune of the people in 401 BC. With two of his colleagues, brought charges against two military tribunes of the preceding year. Brought forward an agrarian law, and prevented the tribute for the maintenance of the armies from being levied from the plebeians.
- Gaius Curiatius, tribune of the people in 138 BC, whom Cicero characterized as a homo infirmus. He caused the consuls of that year, Publius Cornelius Scipio Nasica and Decimus Junius Brutus, to be thrown into prison for the severity with which they proceeded in levying fresh troops, and for their disregard to the privilege of the tribunes to exempt certain persons from military service.
- Gaius Curiatius Trigeminus, appears on several coins, and may be identical with the tribune of 138, or perhaps his son, or with one of the patrician Curiatii.
- Curiatius Maternus, a rhetorician and author of tragedies, who was put to death by Domitian.

== See also ==
- List of Roman gentes
