= Lex Villia Annalis =

Ancient Roman law

In Ancient Rome, the Lex Villia Annalis was a law passed in 180 BC that regulated the minimum age requirements of candidacy for different public offices within the cursus honorum.

The law was proposed by Lucius Villius Annalis, a Tribune of the Plebs, after previous debate within the senate pertaining to the age requirements for magistracies. These debates had arisen due to an increase in competition from a rise in new families attempting to gain success and social change within Roman society, which placed pressure on the political sphere. Where previous laws had failed to be passed or were too ambiguous to result in change, the Lex Villia Annalis has been described as having created a standard for a career in the cursus honorum.

Significant debate has arisen over the context and content of the law, given the minimal number of references provided within antiquity. It is questionable as to the level of detail within the law and whether or not it arose out of a formalisation of past customs.

== Background and creation ==
The Lex Villia Annalis appears to form a part of several legislative changes that sought to ease the intensity of political competition (there was a high level of bribery and corruption resulting from the growing number of candidates for the curule seat) and the irregularity by which individuals could achieve the senior magisterial positions. A number of laws proposed and carried out at the beginning of the second century suggest a greater legislative movement concerned with a further regulation and codification of the cursus honorum.

For example, there was a law passed in 184 BC which ruled that 'a politician might not hold two curule offices simultaneously' (Livy 39.39.4). Richard Evans asserts that the lex Villia annalis was related to the preceding lex Baebia and lex de ambitu; these laws were respectively passed in 181 by consular colleagues P. Cornelius Cethegus and M. Baebius Tamphilus to combat electoral corruption. The lex Baebia is said to have reduced the praetorian college from six to four members in alternate years (Livy 40.44.2), while the lex de ambitu further dealt with 'political malpractice'.

There is also good reason to suppose that a similar piece of legislation to the lex Villia annalis (referred to by Cicero as the lex annalis), which sought to enact age requirements for public magistracies, was also proposed in 181 and was most likely drafted by a certain Marcus Pinarius Rusca (Cic. De or. II.65). There is no surviving information about the contents of this law, and it appears to have failed.

In 180 BC, the tribune of the plebs Lucius Villius Annalis made a successful proposal for a law that regulated 'the ages at which each magistracy might be sought and held' (Livy 40. 44). Evans noted that the law likely introduced an 'obligatory biennium between curule offices, or at least between praetorship and consulship'.

== Function ==
The Lex Villia Annalis formalise limits on the minimum age at which a Roman politician could ascend to a particular magistracy on the cursus honorum. It formalised a set of requirements to ascend to a magistracy which previously were likely informal but widely subscribed to. This included a minimum age for each of the senior magistracies above and including the aedileship, as well as a requirement for 10 years of military service at the equestrian level or 16 years of military service as an infantryman.

The age limits, as laid out by Evans, were:

- 36 years of age to be qualified for the aedileship;
- 39 years of age to be qualified for the praetorship in the 2nd century;
- 42 years of age to be qualified for the consulship.

While the law served to impose limits on who could actually apply for individual magistrates, there is much conjecture on how necessary the law actually was and the extent to which it served an important function. While later challenges to the law became increasingly prevalent following Gaius Marius, from its passing until the latter second and first century BC it served as a powerful check for young men seeking office by limiting how early they could run for political offices in all but the most exceptional circumstances.

There are two primary methods by which these limits have been ascertained. The first is by allusion to them in ancient sources: for example, Cicero in his fifth Philippic oration refers to the death of Alexander the Great at the age of 32 and says, 'Did not the Macedonian Alexander, having begun to perform mighty deeds from his earliest youth, die when he was only in his thirty-third year? And that age is ten years less than that fixed by our laws for a man to be eligible for the consulship' (Cic. Phil. 5.48). This quotation from Cicero directly evidences the minimum consular age of 42. The other method which is used by Alan Astin is to look at the various ages at which certain individuals became consul, and to a lesser extent, at what ages they attained the lesser magistracies. Following the observance of patterns, Astin sought to calculate quantifiable limits, and the data which he finds seems to confirm the trends. Even in situations where an exceptional candidate such as Scipio Aemilianus attained the consulship early at the age of 36, special legislation was required to be passed before he was able to take the office.

Some scholars such as Theodor Mommsen disputed the extent to which the law would actually have played a part in imposing limitations. As counter-examples, he cites the principle of biennium (the requirement for magistrates not to serve in consecutive years), the already required 10 years military service prior to holding office, and the rigidity of the cursus honorum. However, simply because the law was 'otiose' did not mean that it was not passed, as Astin shows. While perhaps not fundamentally changing the way Roman political magistracies could be obtained, the Lex Villia Annalis formalised rules and regulations surrounding its passing.

== Later challenges to the law ==
Throughout the second and the first century of the Roman Republic, the Roman people challenged or ignored the lex Villia Annalis on multiple occasions. This was often the case when the Romans were faced with war.

=== Scipio Aemilianus ===
In 148 BC, Scipio Aemilianus was made consul for 147 by the Roman people while still under the minimum age for the consulship. The voters bypassed this law since they believed that the exceptional circumstances surrounding the Third Punic War required them to do so and more importantly, that it was their prerogative to do so. Appian summarises this prerogative like so: ‘by the laws handed down from Tullius and Romulus the people were the judges of the elections, and that, of the laws pertaining thereto, they could set aside or confirm whichever they pleased’ (App. Pun. 112).

After the Roman people had made him consul, Scipio Aemilianus was immediately assigned to campaign in Africa without the need to draw lots to decide his campaign location. This procedure was normally undertaken by new consuls, and so the Roman peoples’ ability to skirt their own long-standing traditions calls into question how concrete the lex Villia Annalis really was, or Roman legislation in general. The Roman peoples' judgement was, however, correct: Scipio Aemilianus successfully took Carthage in 146, thus ending the Third Punic War.

=== Gaius Marius ===
In 105 BC, Gaius Marius was for the second time elected as consul, this time for 104. This occurred after his victory in the war with Jugurtha, only to find that the Germanic tribes of the Cimbri and the Teutones were gradually becoming a threat to Italy. The Roman people thought it necessary to have the same competent leader to deal with the fresh threats, even if it meant violating the lex Villia Annalis, a law which their ancestors had passed. Consequently, the Cimbrian War commenced between the Roman Republic and the Germanic tribes.

Just as the lex Villia Annalis stated that there was to be a biennium between magistracies, it seems that it was also illegal to hold subsequent consulships within a short time frame, since Plutarch recorded that ‘the law forbade that a man in his absence and before the lapse of a specified time should be elected again’ (Plutarch Mar. 12). Marius fulfilled both criteria: firstly, he was elected consul for the second time while away in Africa and secondly, he held his second consulship only three years after his first consulship.

=== Pompey ===
In response to Marius' disregard for the cursus honorum (he had held the consulship seven times), Sulla tightened the regulations of the cursus honorum in 81 BC to prevent ambitious young men from ascending to the top of the political chain too quickly. Although the regulations required a minimum age of 39 for the praetorship, Pompey was granted pro-praetorian imperium to lead an army against the Marians in Africa and Sicily when he was only 24 years of age (App. Mith. 14.91-96). Completing the task in 40 days, Pompey returned and demanded a Roman triumph to recognise his achievement. Sulla initially refused the triumph as such a request was against his own restatement of the lex Villia annalis (lex Cornelia de magistratibus), but capitulated when Pompey refused to disband his army, reportedly muttering the famous words that 'more people worship the rising than the setting sun' (Plut. Pomp. 14.3).

== See also ==
- Age of candidacy
- Constitution of the Roman Republic
- List of Roman laws
- Roman Law
