= Maenia gens =

Ancient Roman family

The gens Maenia, occasionally written Mainia, was a plebeian family at ancient Rome. Members of this gens are first mentioned soon after the establishment of the Republic, and occur in history down to the second century BC. Several of them held the position of tribune of the plebs, from which they strenuously advocated on behalf of their order. The most illustrious of the family was Gaius Maenius, consul in 338 BC, and dictator in both 320 and 314. In some manuscripts, the nomen Maenius appears to have been erroneously substituted for Menenius or Manlius; there are also instances of confusion with Manilius, Maelius, and Maevius.

== Praenomina ==
The Maenii of the Republic definitely used the praenomina Gaius, Publius, Titus, and Quintus, all of which were very common names throughout Roman history. Individuals named Marcus and Lucius probably belonged to other gentes, whose nomina have been confused with Maenius.

== Branches and cognomina ==
No surnames of the Maenii occur in ancient historians, but from the coins of the gens, we know that some of them bore the cognomen Antiaticus, in honour of the victory of the consul Gaius Maenius over the Latins in 338 BC, leading to the capture of Antium.

== Members ==
This list includes abbreviated praenomina. For an explanation of this practice, see filiation.

- Maenius, said to have proposed the addition of instauratitius to the Circensian games, which occurred in 489 BC; this suggests that Maenius was tribune of the plebs in that year, although no ancient historian so describes him. In some manuscripts, his name is Maevius.
- Gaius Maenius, tribune of the plebs in 483 BC, attempted to veto a levy of soldiers by the consuls until they agreed to allot some of the public land to the plebeians. The consuls avoided his veto by holding the levy outside the boundary of the city, where the tribunes were powerless, and punishing those who failed to appear.
- Marcus Maenius, according to some manuscripts of Livy, tribune of the plebs in 410 BC, proposed an agrarian law, and like Gaius Maenius attempted to carry it into effect by preventing a levy of troops by the consuls. Maenius' colleagues opposed his action, and the levy went forward. Maenius became so popular that the Roman Senate, fearing that he would be elected consular tribune, determined that consuls should be elected for the following year instead. He and two Maenii who appear as tribunes of the plebs in 384 and 357 appear to be erroneous emendations for the original Menenius.
- Publius Maenius, said by Livy to have been consular tribune in 400 BC, and again in 396, is probably a mistake for Manlius; Publius Manlius Vulso was consular tribune in 400; Quintus Manlius Vulso was consular tribune in 396.
- Marcus Maenius, said to have been tribune of the plebs in 384 BC, appears to be a mistake for Marcus Menenius.
- Lucius Maenius, supposedly tribune of the plebs in 357 BC, appears to be a mistake for Lucius Menenius.
- Publius Menenius P. f., father of the consul Maenius.
- Gaius Maenius P. f. P. n. Antiaticus, consul in 338 BC, he and his colleague, Lucius Furius Camillus, triumphed over the Latins; Maenius won the surname of Antiaticus for his defeat of the Latin army on the Astura, near Antium. Maenius was appointed dictator in 320, to investigate a conspiracy. Censor in 318, Maenius received a second dictatorship in 314, again to investigate a conspiracy involving the nobles of Capua. He was honoured with a statue on a column, later known as the Columna Maenia, which stood on the Capitoline Hill near one end of the forum.
- Maenius, proposed a law requiring the patricians to give their assent to the imperium of elected magistrates, about 286 BC. Some scholars suppose that he might have been tribune of the plebs, but Niebuhr proposes that it might have been the consul Maenius, whose high reputation might have secured the passage of such a law in his old age.
- Marcus Maenius, a military tribune, who fell in battle against Mago in 203 BC, during the Second Punic War; possibly should be Maevius.
- Publius Maenius, triumvir monetalis between 194 and 190 BC.
- Maenius, triumvir monetalis between 189 and 180 BC. Crawford suggests that he could have been the same as Quintus Maenius, the praetor of 170.
- Titus Maenius, praetor urbanus in 186 BC, was a military tribune in 180, under the propraetor Quintus Fulvius Flaccus, who was sent against the Celtiberi.
- Maenius, a spendthrift who squandered his fortune. In 184 BC, he sold his house in the forum to the censor, Cato, who used the land to build the Basilica Porcia.
- Gaius Maenius, praetor in 180 BC, assigned the province of Sicily. The Senate tasked him with investigating all cases of poisoning that occurred more than ten miles from Rome, but the task proved so burdensome that he asked the Senate to relieve him of one of his responsibilities.
- Quintus Maenius T. f., praetor in 170 BC, served in the Third Macedonian War. He announced the Senate's repudiation of the acts of the praetor Lucius Hortensius, who had sacked the city of Abdera, and sold its people into slavery.
- Publius Maenius M. f. Antiaticus, triumvir monetalis in 132 BC. His cognomen shows a claimed descent from Gaius Maenius, the consul of 338 BC . (Note: Eckhel had a corroded coin in hand and misread MF for ME and conjectured that it might have been the first letters of an agnomen, Megellus or Medulinus.)
- Titus Maenius T. f., a senator in 73 BC.

== See also ==
- List of Roman gentes

== Bibliography ==
- Marcus Tullius Cicero, Pro Sestio, Brutus.
- Diodorus Siculus, Bibliotheca Historica (Library of History).
- Quintus Horatius Flaccus (Horace), Satirae (Satires), Epistulae.
- Titus Livius (Livy), Ab Urbe Condita (History of Rome).
- Dionysius of Halicarnassus, Romaike Archaiologia.
- Gaius Plinius Secundus (Pliny the Elder), Naturalis Historia (Natural History).
- Lucius Annaeus Florus, Epitome de T. Livio Bellorum Omnium Annorum DCC (Epitome of Livy: All the Wars of Seven Hundred Years).
- Pomponius Porphyrion, Commentarii in Q. Horatium Flaccum (Commentaries on Horace).
- Pseudo-Asconius, Commentarius in Oratorio Ciceronis Divinatio in Quintum Caecilium (Commentary on Cicero's Divinatio in Quintum Caecilium).
- Lucius Cassius Dio Cocceianus (Cassius Dio), Roman History.
- Ambrosius Theodosius Macrobius, Saturnalia.
- Joseph Hilarius Eckhel, Doctrina Numorum Veterum (The Study of Ancient Coins, 1792–1798).
- Barthold Georg Niebuhr, The History of Rome, Julius Charles Hare and Connop Thirlwall, trans., John Smith, Cambridge (1828).
- Friedrich Gotthilf Osann, De Columna Maenia, Georg Friedrich Heyer, Giessen (1844).
- Wilhelm Adolf Becker, Handbuch der Römischen Alterhümer (Handbook of Roman Antiquities), Weidmannsche Buchhandlung, Leipzig (1846).
- Dictionary of Greek and Roman Biography and Mythology, William Smith, ed., Little, Brown and Company, Boston (1849).
- Wilhelm Dittenberger, Sylloge Inscriptionum Graecarum (Collection of Greek Inscriptions, abbreviated SIG), Leipzig (1883).
- T. Robert S. Broughton, The Magistrates of the Roman Republic, American Philological Association (1952).
- Michael Crawford, Roman Republican Coinage, Cambridge University Press (1974, 2001).
