= Marcus Silius Messala =

2nd century Roman senator and consular legate

Marcus Silius Messala (born ca. AD 160, fl.193) was a Roman senator and suffect consul towards the end of the 2nd century. In 193, Messala was the suffect consul from May until June. He was in command of the location where the murder of Pertinax took place. Septimius Severus accused Messala of murdering Pertinax and using his influence to convene and order the Senate to install the Senator Didius Julianus as Emperor. Septimius Severus called the death of Didius Julianus divine providence and ordered the execution of Messala.

An inscription currently in the collection of the Pera Museum in Istanbul names Messala as consular legate of Bithynia et Pontus in the early years of the reign of Septimus Severus (c. 194–197).

It is possible that he may be the same Silius Messala condemned to death in the year AD 218 by Emperor Elagabalus. It is more likely, though, that the second Messala was a son of this senator.

== Literature ==
- PIR ² S 724, 725

Political offices
Preceded by Quintus Tineius Sacerdos, and Publius Julius Scapula Priscus as suffect consuls	Suffect consul of the Roman Empire; 193 with ignotus	Succeeded by Lucius Julius Messala Rutilianus, and Gaius Aemilius Severus Cantabrinus as suffect consuls
