= Alba Longa =

Ancient city in the Alban Hills in Latium

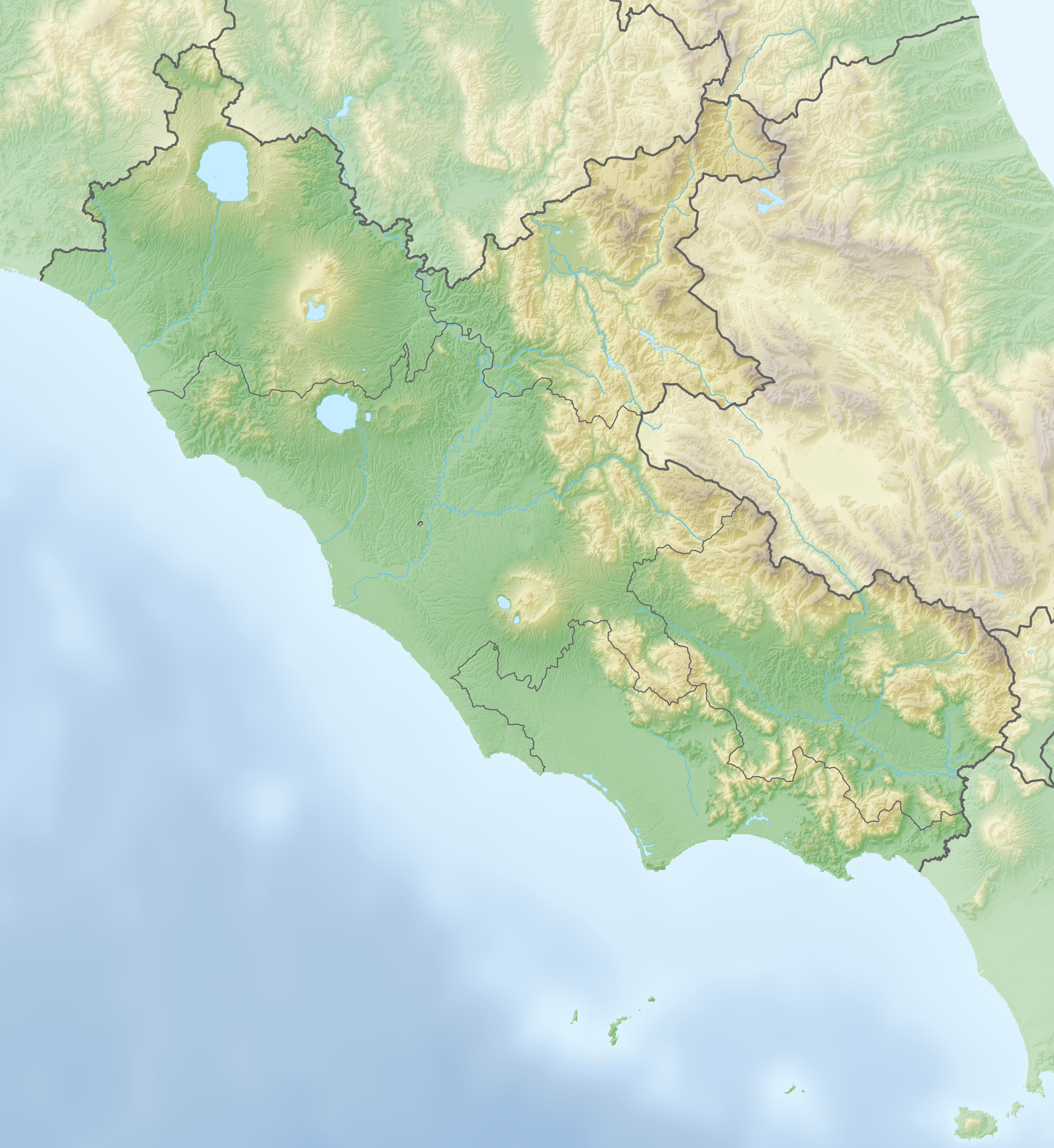
- Map of the Italian Region of Lazio showing approximate location of Alba Longa Map of Italy showing approximate location of Alba Longa
- 41°44′49″N 12°39′01″E
- Type: Ancient
- Periods: Classical antiquity
- Location: Italy
- Region: Alban Hills
- Part of: Italy

History
- Built: 1200 BC (mythologically)
- Abandoned: c. 700 BC

Alba Longa (occasionally written Albalonga in Italian sources) was an ancient Latin city in Central Italy in the vicinity of Lake Albano in the Alban Hills. The ancient Romans believed it to be the founder and head of the Latin League, before it was destroyed by the Roman Kingdom around the middle of the 7th century BC and its inhabitants were forced to settle in Rome. In legend, Romulus and Remus, founders of Rome, had come from the royal dynasty of Alba Longa, which in Virgil's Aeneid had been the bloodline of Aeneas, a son of Venus.

According to Livy, Roman patrician families such as the Julii, Servilii, Quinctii, Geganii, Curiatii and Cloelii originated in Alba Longa.

== Archaeology ==
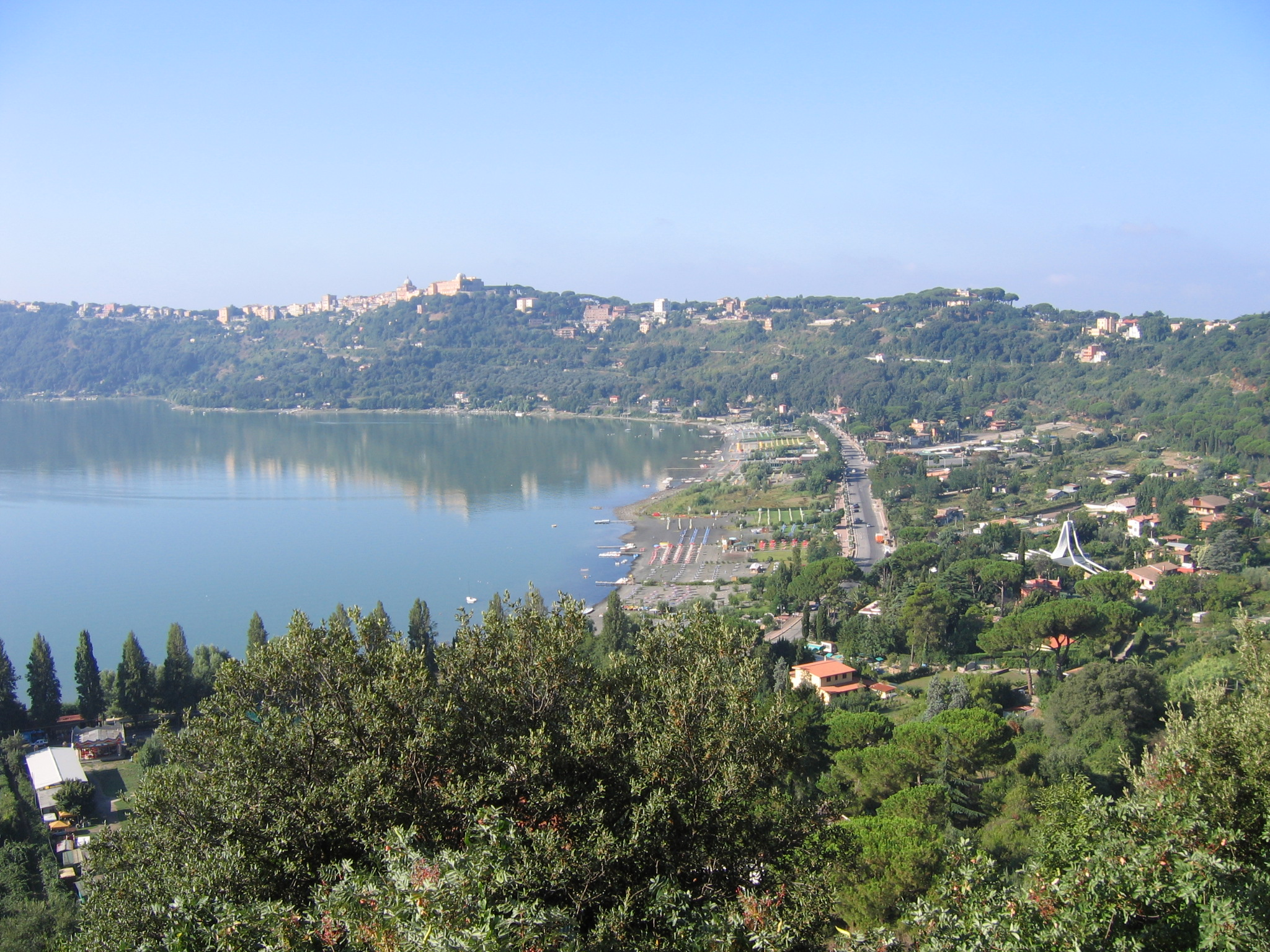
Castel Gandolfo on a long, sunlit ridge overlooking Lake Albano, the most likely site of ancient Alba Longa

Livy said of Alba Longa that it was founded by Ascanius to relieve crowding at Lavinium. He placed it at the foot of the Alban Mount and said it took its name from its extension along a ridge. Dionysius of Halicarnassus repeated the story, but added that Ascanius, following an oracle given to his father, collected other Latin populations as well. Noting that alba means "white" and longa means "long", he translated the name into the Greek language as "long white town". Dionysius placed the town between the Alban Mount and the Alban Lake, thus beginning a long controversy about its location.

There is, however, "no archaeological evidence of a powerful state in the area of the Alban Hills at this time". It is unlikely, in the opinion of classicist Tim Cornell, that there was any urbanised city-state capable of holding hegemony in the region at the time. Nor is there any convincing evidence to connect the modern town of Albano Laziale with the ancient Alba Longa. Much of the prominence of Alba Longa in the ancient world was due to its status as a religious centre, as it hosted the annual Latin Festival on the mons Albanus in honour of Jupiter Latiaris.

Archaeological data show the existence of a string of villages in the Iron Age, each with its own necropolis, along the south-western shore of Lake Albano. At the time it was destroyed by Rome, these villages must have still been in a pre-urban phase, beginning to group around a centre which may well have been Castel Gandolfo, whose significantly larger necropolis suggests a larger town.

In the later republican period, the territory of Alba (the Ager Albanus) was settled once again with many residential villas, which are mentioned in ancient literature and of which remains are extant.

Since the 16th century, the site has been at various times identified as that of the Convent of St. Paul at Palazzola near Albano, Coste Caselle near Marino, and Castel Gandolfo. The last-named of these places in fact occupies the site of the Villa of Domitian which, according to Juvenal, was situated on the arx of Alba.

== Legendary history ==
The Roman tradition held that Alba Longa was an urbanised city-state that founded several Latin colonies, which it then organised into a Latin League. This narrative is implausible, likely anachronistic, and "cannot be historically true in a literal sense". Archaeological evidence indicates the presence of small villages in the area of the Alban hills during the late Bronze and early Iron Ages, but they failed to develop into cities and "are certainly unlikely to have founded Rome".

=== Founding myth ===
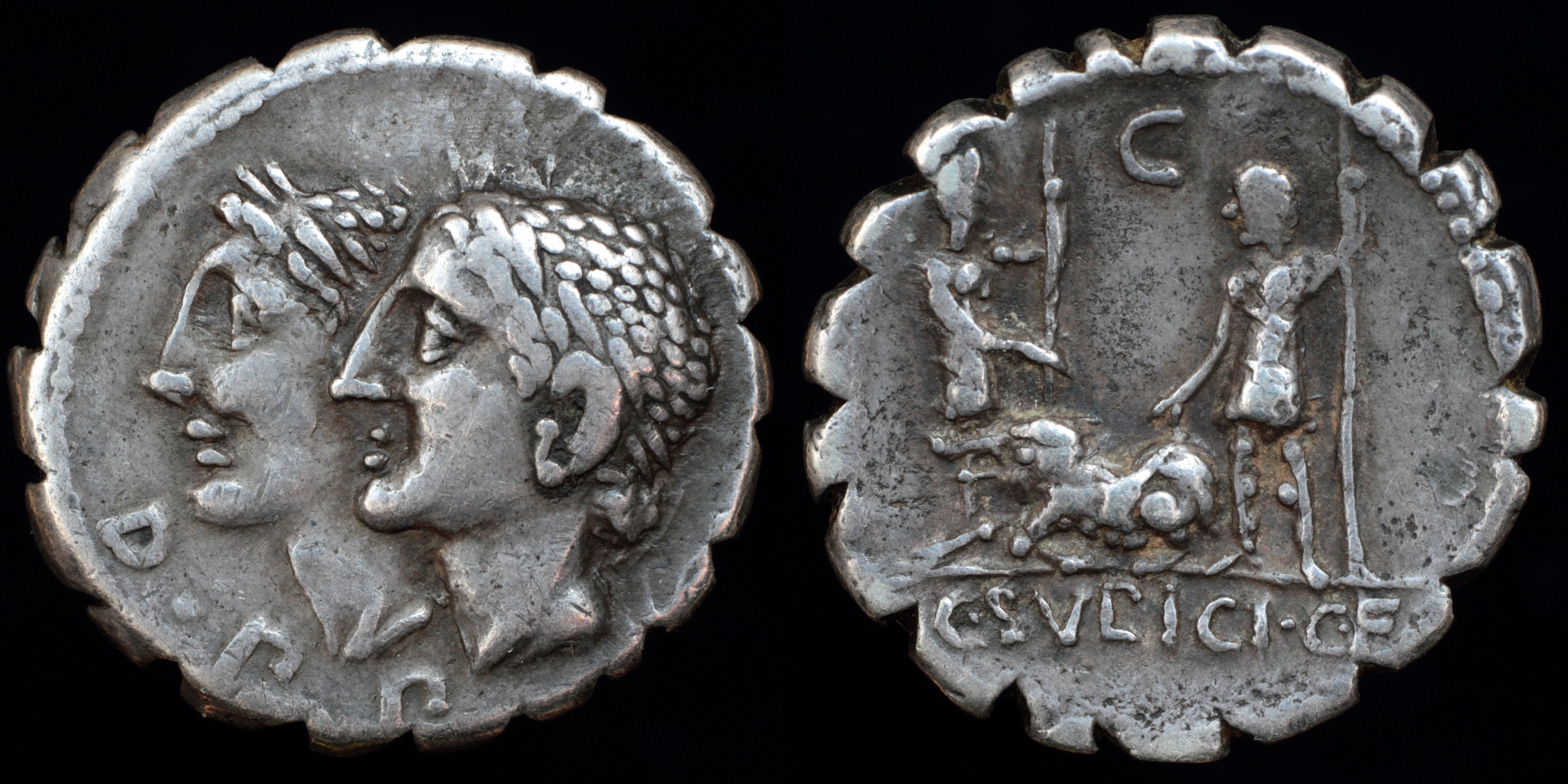

First side of the image: O: Two jugate heads of Di Penates, D · P · P
Second side of the image: R: Soldiers with spears pointing at lying sow, C·SV(LP)ICI·C·F
Reverse depicts scene from Aeneid. According to prophecy, a white sow that casts 30 piglets predicts the foundation of (Lavinium) and a new city called after the white sow built by Ascanius 30 years later (Alba Longa).

Silver serrate denarius struck by C. Sulpicius C. f. Galba in Rome 106 BC.

ref.: Sulpicia 1., Sydenham 572., Craw. 312/1

According to Roman mythology, after the fall of Troy in 1184 BC, Aeneas led a group of surviving Trojans through the Mediterranean Sea to Sicily, Carthage, and eventually the Italian Peninsula. On landing in Italy, he was welcomed by Latinus, king of the early Latins. Soon, Aeneas married King Latinus' daughter, Lavinia, and founded the city of Lavinium in her name. Latinus later fell in war, making Aeneas king of the Latins and his son Ascanius (also called Iulus) his successor.

A few years later, Aeneas was killed in battle, like Latinus, and Ascanius became king of the Latins. Ascanius is said to have built Alba Longa as his capital on the slope of Mount Alba, resettling six hundred families there as a colony of Lavinium in 1151 BC, only thirty years after Lavinium itself was founded. His descendants then ruled the Latins for another five hundred years. According to the grammarian Festus, these kings were considered the source of the red or Tyrian purple calceus mulleus later worn by the Roman patricians.

=== Latin league ===
Alba Longa was reportedly the leading city of the roughly thirty cities, its colonies, that it led in the Latin League. The league's conferences were held by the Ferentine spring, in the scenic part of the valley between Albano and Marino, until the middle of the fourth century. The sacrifices of the league were offered on the Alban mountain from which all the country of Latium might be seen.

The colonies of Alba Longa were distinct from the Alban townships, which must have consisted of Albani plebs, as the genuine Albans were the populus. Among the Alban colonies, some become part of the plebs; others become Latin cities. The others were ceded to the Latins to maintain a consistent thirty townships, thirty being of great importance among the Latin kingdoms as twelve was to the Ionians (or 4 divided into 3 parts each). Accordingly, the Latin kingdom of Latinus, and the Rutulian kingdom of Turnus must have had thirty cities each with Laurentum as the Latin capital before the arrival of Aeneas.

Roman tradition held that Rome itself was founded as a colony of Alba Longa by Romulus and Remus, two of the city's princes, who had been banished at birth in a dynastic struggle. The ancient Romans dated this event to the middle of the eighth century BC.

=== War with Rome ===
In the seventh century BC, the Roman king Tullus Hostilius succeeded Numa Pompilius. During his reign, Rome's attitude toward its neighbours no longer reflected Numa's peaceful nature. Now it reflected Tullus's own predilection for war. When a dispute erupted between a group of Romans and Albans, he seized upon the mutual accusations of robbery as a pretext for conflict. Both sides sent emissaries to demand redress. When the Alban delegation arrived in Rome, Tullus purposefully gave them such a warm greeting that they delayed making their demand. The Roman delegates, however, immediately addressed the Albans and were refused. By virtue of the Alban's first refusal, Tullus was justified in declaring war.

Livy describes the war as being akin to a civil war because the Romans were said to be descended from the Albans.

The king of the Albans, Cluilius, marched with his army into Roman territory, established a camp, and dug a huge trench around Rome, which became known as the Cluilian trench. However, Cluilius died in the camp of unspecified causes, whereupon the Albans appointed Mettius Fufetius as dictator to lead the army in his place.

Tullus emerged from Rome with his army, passed the Alban camp at night, and marched into Alban territory. Mettius followed, camped near the Roman army, and then sent a representative to invite Tullus to confer before any engagement. Tullus accepted the invitation. However, both sides were drawn up for battle while the leaders met between the two forces.

==== The Horatii and Curiatii ====
At the conference, Mettius proposed that the dispute be resolved by some means other than mass bloodshed, citing the concern that the nearby Etruscans would fall upon the two Latin states if these were weakened by war and unable to defend themselves. It was agreed that a set of triplets from each side, three brothers Horatii and three Curiatii, would battle for the victory of the two states. Livy refers to conflict amongst his own sources as to which set of brothers represented which state, but prefers the view that the Horatii were the Romans, and the Curiatii Albans.

Vows were entered into in a most solemn form by each of the Romans and the Albans as to this agreement by which the future of each state would be bound by the outcome of the fight. Marcus Valerius was appointed Fetial, and Spurius Fusius Pater Patratus, for the purposes of binding Rome by the treaty.

The combat commenced. Two of the Romans were the first to fall. Then the remaining Roman, Publius Horatius, slew the three Albans and thus won victory for Rome. Afterwards, Tullus ordered Mettius to return with his army to Alba, but to be prepared in the event of war with Veii. The Albans became, in substance, a vassal state of Rome.

=== War with Veii and Fidenae ===
Not long afterwards, war did indeed break out with Veii and also with the Fidenates. Mettius and the Albans were ordered to march to battle with Tullus and the Romans, and they met the Etruscans on the far side of the Anio, on the banks of the Tiber. However, when the battle commenced, Mettius led his troops away from the battle, leaving the Romans to fight the Etruscans alone.

Rome was victorious against the Etruscans. After the battle, Tullus executed Mettius for his perfidy. Then, on Tullus' orders, the Roman soldiers demolished the 400-year-old city of Alba Longa, leaving only the temples standing, and the entire population of Alba Longa was transported to Rome, thereby doubling the number of Roman citizens. Tullus enlisted the leading families of Alba amongst the patricians, namely the Julii, Servilii, Quinctii, Geganii, Curiatii and Cloelii. Tullus built a new senate house, the Curia Hostilia, to house the enlarged Roman Senate. He also recruited ten new turmae of equites from amongst the Albans, and new legions. The Alban immigrants lived on the Caelian Hill in Rome.

== Religious institutions ==
=== Temple of Vesta ===
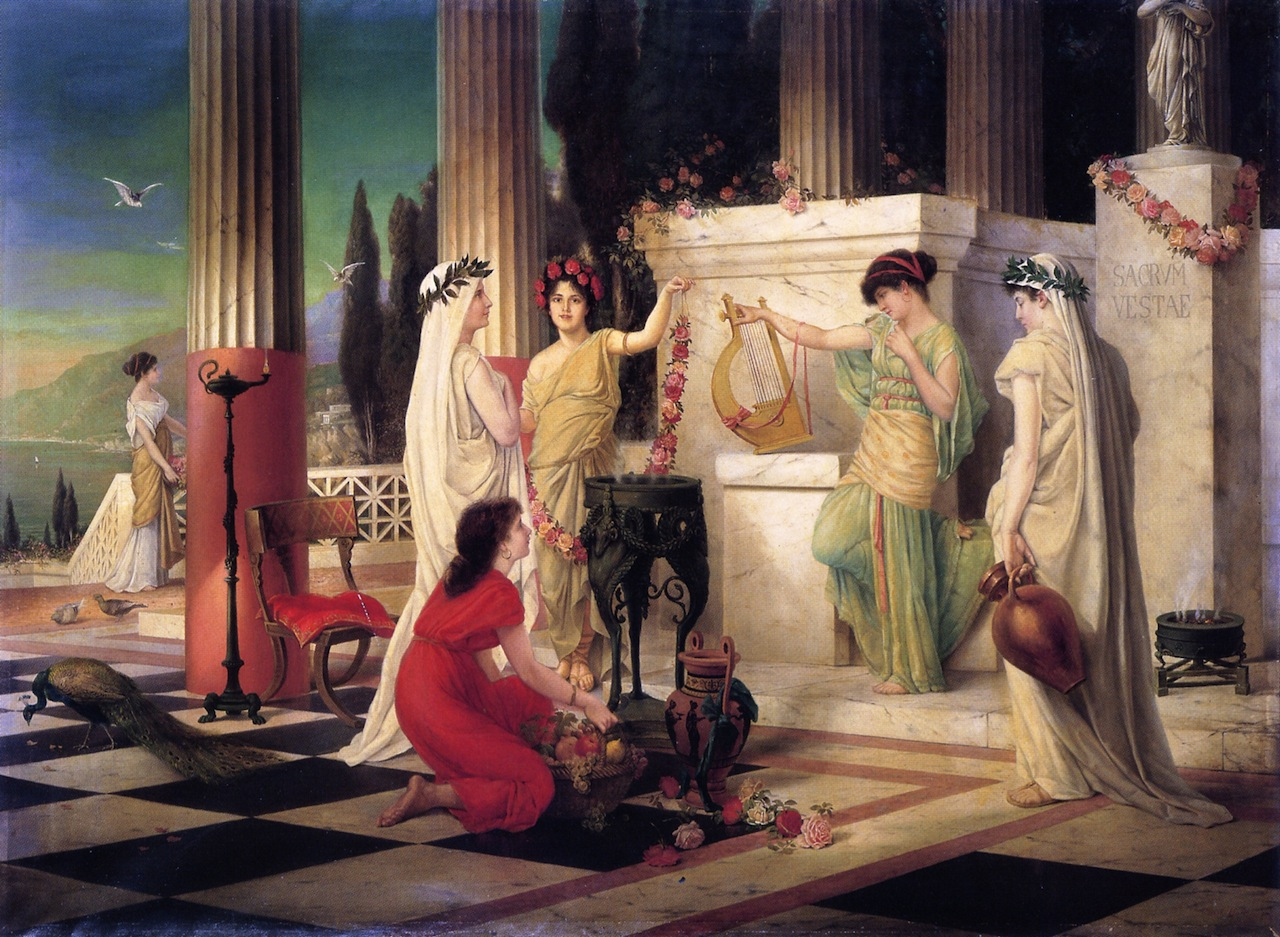
In the temple of Vesta, painting by Constantin Hölscher, 1902

The temple of Vesta which stood at the foot of the Palatine Hill outside Rome presumably predated the city, which at the time of its founding only occupied the top of the hill: the hearth of Vesta would not ordinarily be built outside a city's walls.

Worship of Vesta in Italy began in Lavinium, the mother-city of Alba Longa. From Lavinium, the worship of Vesta was transferred to Alba Longa. Upon entering higher office, Roman magistrates would go to Lavinium to offer sacrifice to Vesta and the household gods the Romans called Penates. Roman mythology claims that the Penates were Trojan gods first introduced to Italy by Aeneas. Among these household gods must have been Vesta, who has been referred to as Vesta Iliaca (Vesta of Troy), with her sacred hearth being named Iliaci foci (Trojan hearth).

The priestesses of Vesta, known as Vestal Virgins, administered her temple and watched the eternal fire. Their existence in Alba Longa is connected with the early Roman traditions, for Silvia the mother of Romulus was a priestess. They were finally established in Rome during the reign of Numa, where they would remain until the institution was disestablished with the rise of Christianity during the late Roman Empire.

=== The shrine of Jupiter Latiaris ===
On the top of the Monte Cavo (Mons Albanus) was a very ancient shrine consecrated to Jupiter Latiaris. Florus (2nd century) states that the site was selected by Ascanius, who, having founded Alba, invited all the Latins to celebrate sacrifices there to Jupiter, a custom which eventually led to the annual celebration there of the Feriae Latinae, at which all the cities that belonged to the Latin Confederation would gather under the aegis of Alba, sacrificing a white bull, the flesh of which was distributed among all the participants.

After Alba Longa was destroyed and her leadership role was assumed by Rome, tradition records the building of a full-scale temple to Jupiter Latiaris on the Alban Mount in the reign of Tarquinius Superbus; of which only a few courses of perimeter wall remain today, now removed off site. There are, however, substantial remains of the paved road that connected it to the Via Appia near Aricia.

== In modern fiction ==
Much of the science fiction story "To Bring the Light" takes place in Alba Longa at the crucial time of Rome's founding. Alba Longa is described as seen by Flavia Herosilla, a well-educated woman who lived in Imperial Rome and was hurled a thousand years back in time, and who is concerned to ensure that Rome will be founded on schedule, for which purpose she successfully instigates a bloody regime change in Alba Longa.

== See also ==
- Latin kings of Alba Longa
- Alban people

== Bibliography ==
=== Modern sources ===
- Ashby, Thomas (1899). "Alba Longa". The Journal of Philology. 27 (53): 37–50.
- Cornell, Tim (1995). The beginnings of Rome. London: Routledge. ISBN 0-415-01596-0. OCLC 31515793.
- Lomas, Kathryn (2018). The rise of Rome. History of the Ancient World. Cambridge: Harvard University Press. doi:10.4159/9780674919938. ISBN 978-0-674-65965-0. S2CID 239349186.
- Paret, Daniel; Legoüez, A (1853). Encyclopédie classique: pouvant servir aux candidats à l'examen du Baccalauréat ès Lettres (in French). pp. 67–70 – via Google Books.

=== Ancient sources ===
- Sextus Pompeius Festus (1913). Lindsay, Wallace M (ed.). De verborum significatu. Teubner.
