= Lucius Villius Annalis (praetor 43 BC) =

1st century BC Roman politician and Praetor

Lucius Villius Annalis was a politician of ancient Rome who served as praetor in 43 BC. He was proscribed by the triumvirs, and betrayed by his son, ultimately leading to his death. He is probably the same as the Lucius Villius L. f. Annalis mentioned in a letter of Caelius to Cicero, 51 BC. His son was killed shortly afterwards in a drunken brawl by the same soldiers who had killed his father.
