= Gaius Rabuleius =

Ancient Roman politician, fl. 486 BC

Gaius Rabuleius was an Ancient Roman tribune of the plebs in 486 BC. He attempted to mediate between the consuls in their disputes about the agrarian law proposed by the consul Spurius Cassius Vecellinus in that year.
