= Lucius Villius Annalis =

2nd Century BC Ancient Roman Politician

Lucius Villius Annalis was a politician of ancient Rome in the 2nd century BC. He was a tribune of the plebs, who first acquired the cognomen "Annalis" in 179 BC, because he introduced a law fixing the year (annus in Latin) at which it was allowable for a person to be a candidate for the public offices, the Lex Villia annalis. He later became praetor peregrinus in 171 BC.
