= List of ancient Romans =

This an alphabetical list of ancient Romans, including citizens of ancient Rome remembered in history.

Note that some people may be listed multiple times, once for each part of the name.

== A ==
- Abronius Silo - Latin poet
- Abudius Ruso - aedile and legate
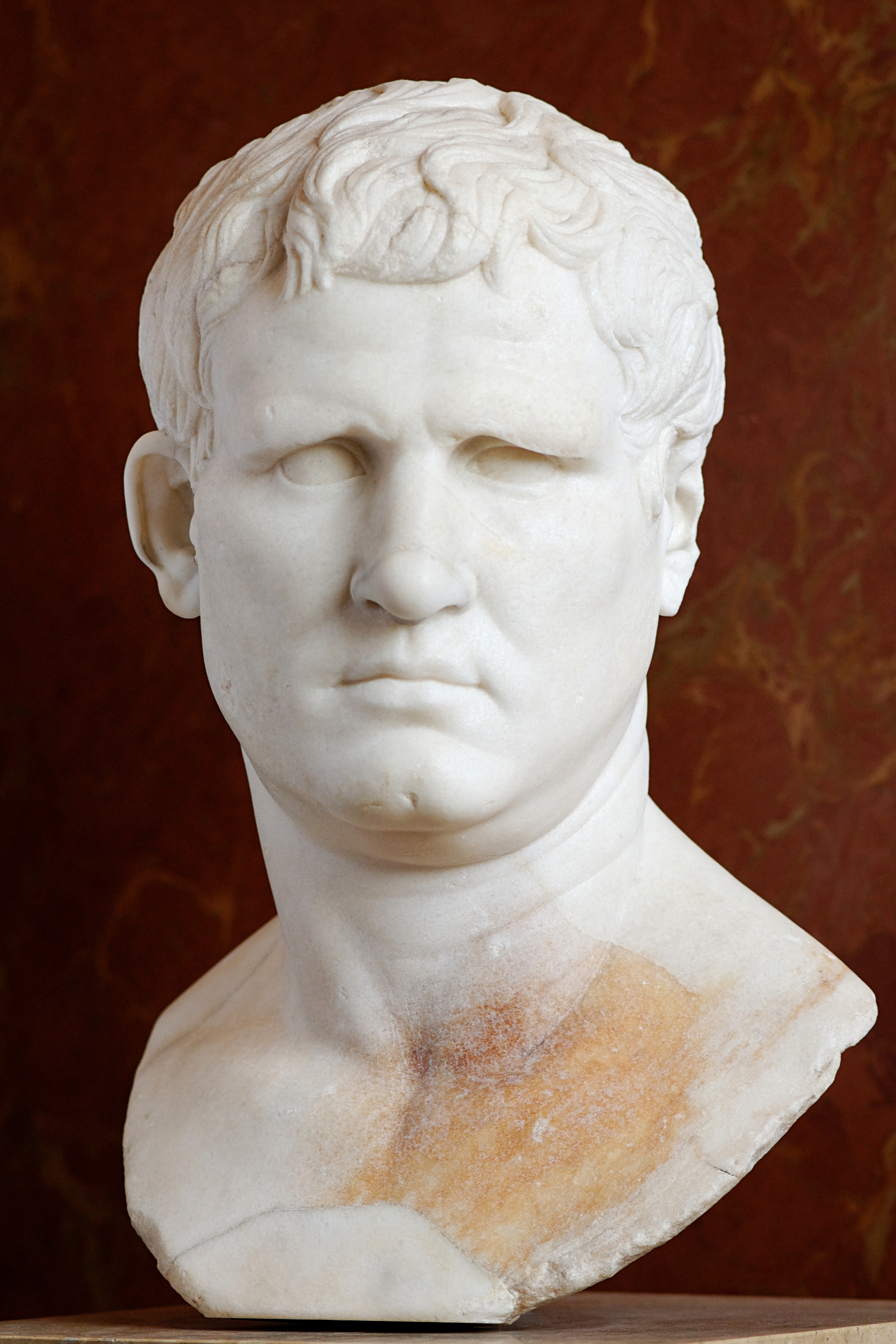
  Portrait of Marcus Vipsanius Agrippa
- Lucius Accius - tragic poet and literary scholar
- Titus Accius - jurist and equestrian
- Acerronia Polla - servant of Agrippina the Younger
- Gnaeus Acerronius Proculus - consul
- Acilius Severus - consul and urban prefect
- Acilius Severus - Christian writer
- Gaius Acilius - senator and historian
- Acilius Rufus - suffect consul in 107
- Anicius Acilius Aginantius Faustus - urban prefect and consul
- Anicius Acilius Glabrio Faustus - urban prefect and praetorian prefect
- Gaius Acilius - senator and historian
- Lucius Acilius Strabo - suffect consul in 80
- Marcus Acilius Priscus Egrilius Plarianus - senator
- Manius Acilius Aviola - consul, curator aquarum, and governor of Asia
- Manius Acilius Aviola - consul in 239
- Manius Acilius Glabrio - consul and general during the Roman-Seleucid War
- Manius Acilius Glabrio - consul and general during the Third Mithridatic War
- Marcus Acilius Glabrio - consul and proconsular governor of Africa
- Manius Acilius Glabrio - consul and colleague of Trajan
- Manius Acilius Glabrio Gnaeus Cornelius Severus - senator, consul, and proconsular governor of Africa
- Rufius Achilius Sividius - quaestor, consul, and urban prefect
- Claudia Acte - freedwoman and mistress of Nero
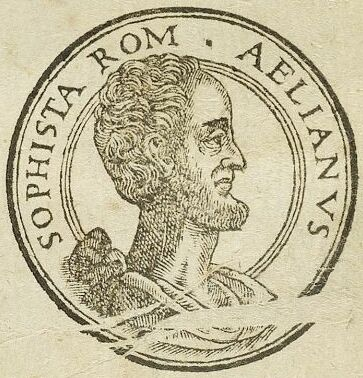
- Drawing of Aelian made in 1610
  Marcus Actorius Naso - writer who possibly wrote a lost biography of Julius Caesar.
- Postumus Aebutius Helva Cornicen - consul
- Titus Aebutius Helva - general, magister equitum, and consul in 499
- Lucius Aebutius Helva - consul in 463 BCE
- Claudius Aelianus (Aelian) - author, teacher, and rhetorician
- Publius Aelius Paetus - consul, censor, and prominent supporter of Scipio Africanus
- Sextus Aelius Paetus Catus - jurist
- Lucius Aelius Caesar - would-be successor to Hadrian
- Quintus Aelius Tubero - consul and priest of the quindecimviri sacris faciundis
- Marcus Aemilius Aemilianus - emperor for three months
- Flavius Aetius - general
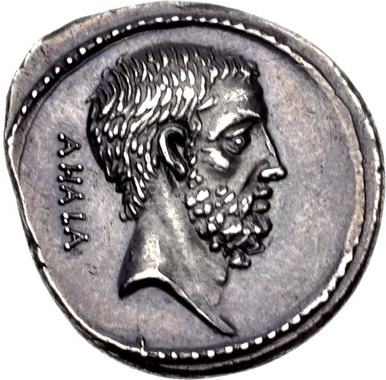
- Denarius with a portrait of Gaius Servilius Ahala
  Gnaeus Domitius Afer - orator
- Lucius Afranius - two; poet and consul
- Julius Africanus - two; orator, Christian philosopher
- Sextus Caecilius Africanus - jurist
- Claudius Agathinus - physician
- Gnaeus Julius Agricola - general in Britain
- Sextus Calpurnius Agricola - governor in Britain
- Marcus Julius Agrippa (Agrippa I) - a king in Judea, romanized
- Marcus Julius Agrippa (Agrippa II) - a king in Judea, romanized
- Marcus Vipsanius Agrippa - general and geographer
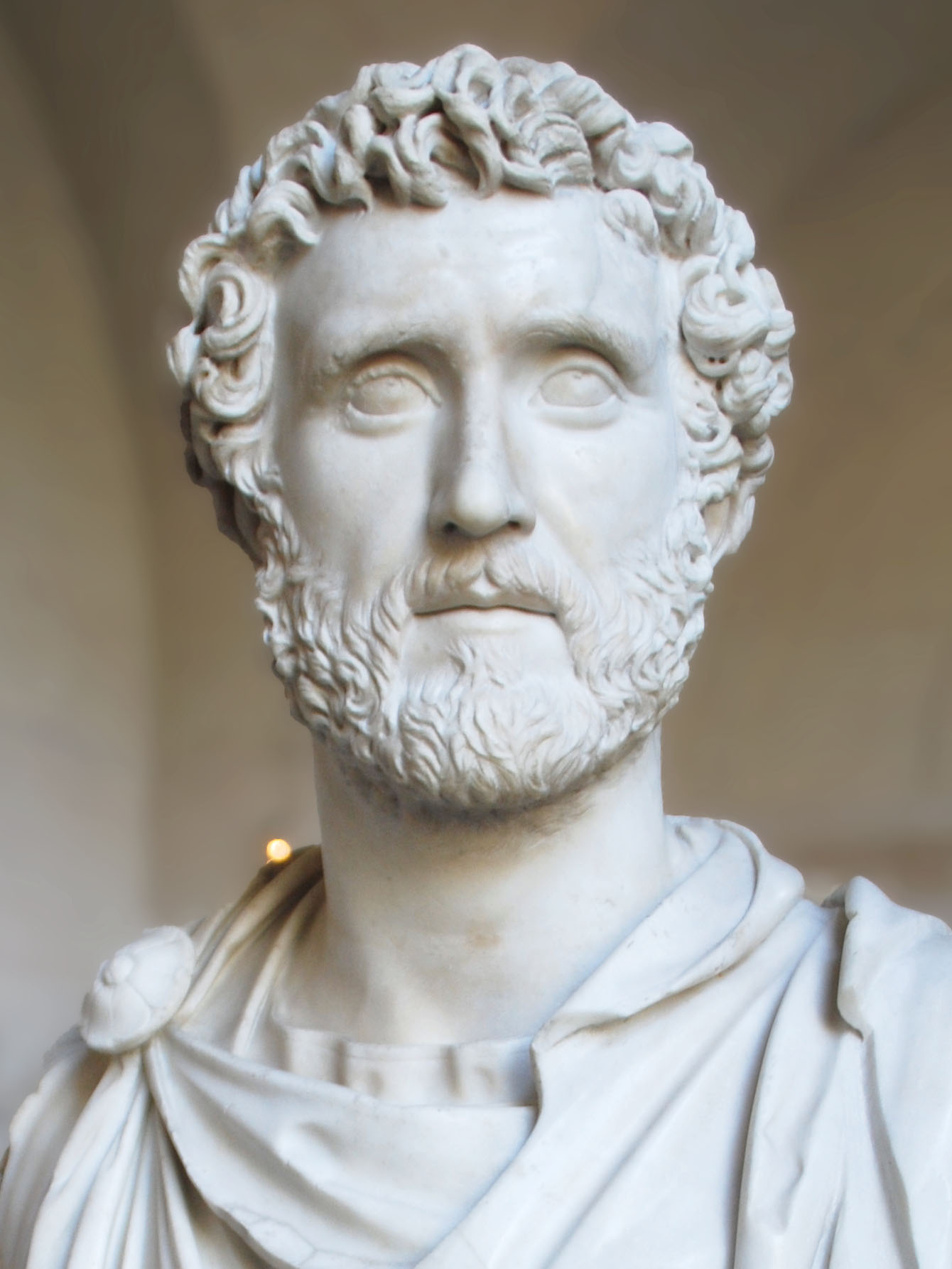
  Portrait of Antoninus Pius
- Marcus Vipsanius Agrippa Postumus - son of Agrippa
- Vipsania Agrippina - daughter of Agrippa
- Agrippina the elder - mother of Caligula
- Agrippina the younger - mother of Nero
- Gaius Servilius Ahala - legendary hero
- Ahenobarbus - several
- Aius Locutius - divine
- Albinovanus Pedo - poet
- Titus Albucius - orator
- Gaius Albucius Silus - orator and teacher of rhetoric
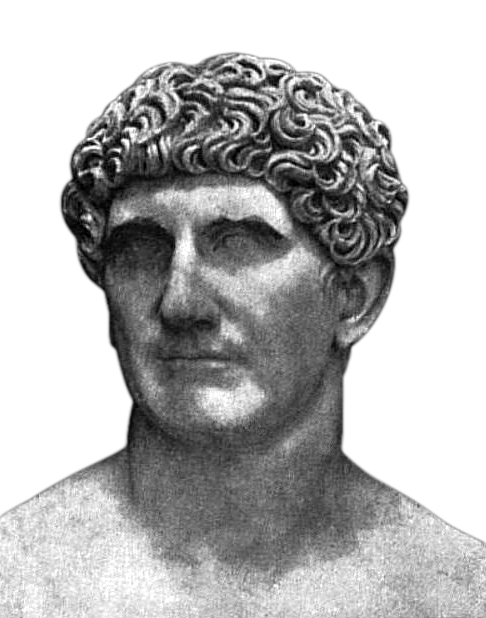
- Bust of Mark Antony
  Alfenus Varus - jurist
- Alfius Avitus - poet
- Allectus - assassin of Carausius
- Gaius Amafinius - philosopher
- Lucius Ambivius Turpio - actor and director
- Amelius Gentilianus - philosopher
- Ammianus Marcellinus - writer
- Lucius Ampelius - writer
- Annius Vinicianus - rebel
- Lucius Annius Vinicianus - plotter
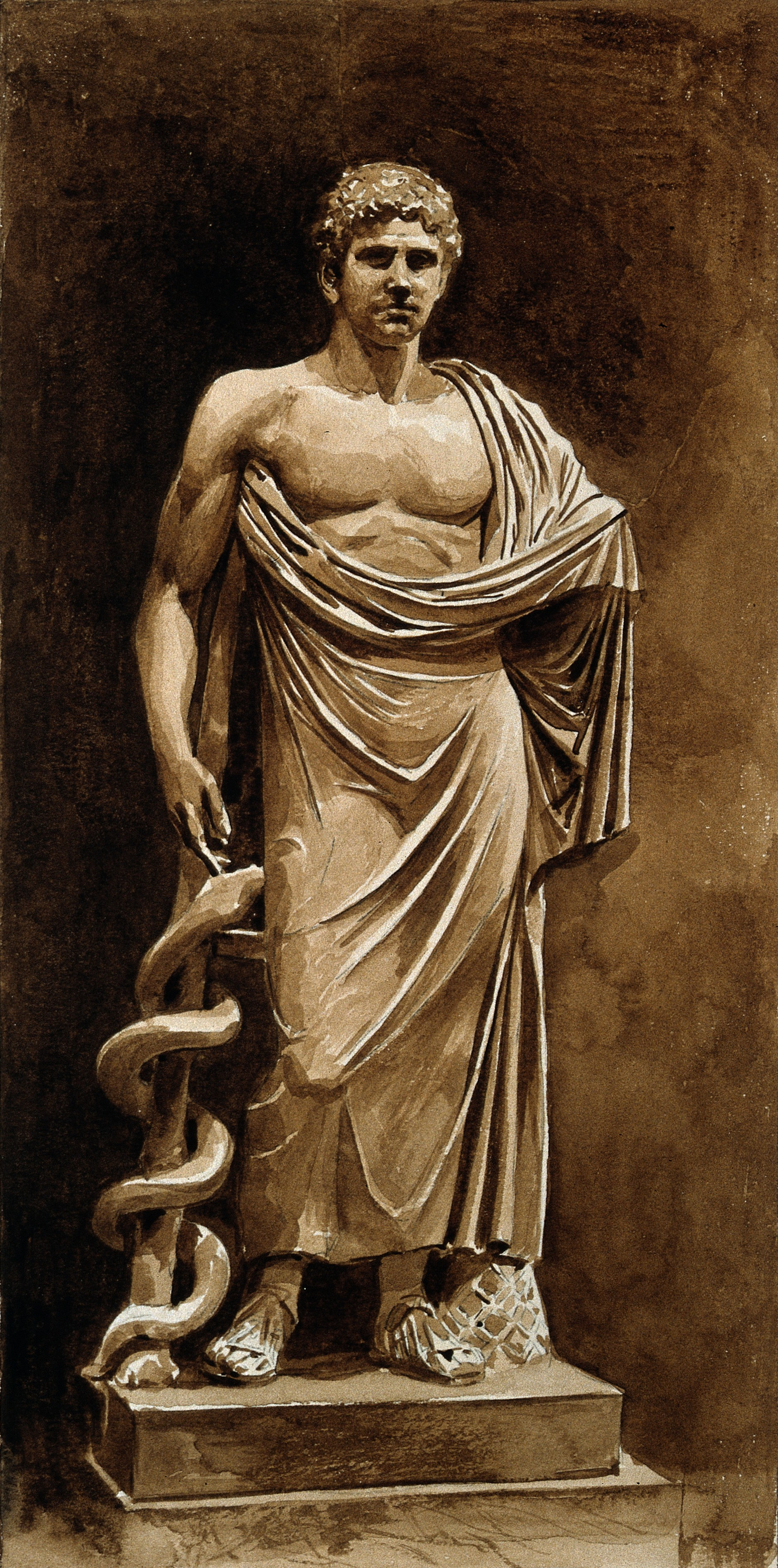
- Statue of Antonius Musa
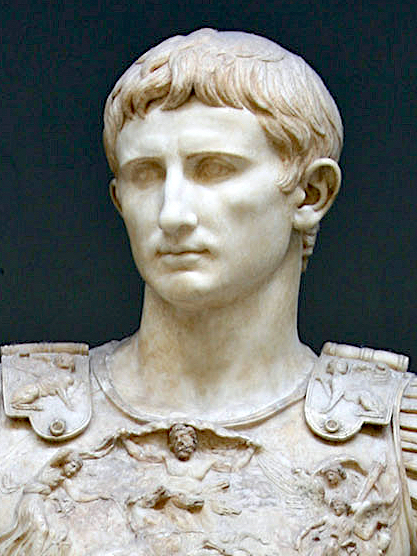
  Head of Augustus. From the statue of Prima Porta.
  Gaius Antistius Vetus - consul 30 BC
- Gaius Antistius Vetus - Caesar Augustus' quaestor
- Gaius Antistius Vetus - consul in 23
- Gaius Antistius Vetus - Consul in 110
- Gaius Antistius Vetus - consul in 178
- Lucius Antistius Vetus - consul
- Antonia - several
- Antoninus Pius - emperor
- Arrius Antoninus - father of the emperor
- Antoninus Liberalis - mythographer
- Gaius Antonius - two
- Iullus Antonius - poet and consul, married Claudia Marcella Major
- Lucius Antonius - consul
- Marcus Antonius
  - Marcus Antonius Orator - consul 99 BC
  - Marcus Antonius Creticus - son of the Orator and father of Mark Antony
  - Mark Antony - triumvir
  - Marcus Antonius Antyllus - son of Mark Antony
- Antonius Castor - freedman
- Antonius Musa - physician
- Antonius Diogenes - writer
- Marcus Aper - advocate
- Aelius Festus Aphthonius - grammarian
- Apicius - several gourmets
- Lucius Apronius - suffect consul
- Pontius Aquila - tribune
- Romanus Aquila - rhetor
- Manius Aquillius - two consuls
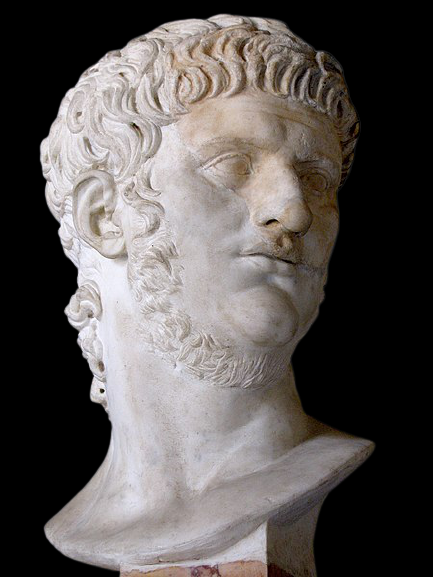
  Bust of Nero
- Gaius Aquillius Gallus - jurist
- Flavius Arcadius - emperor
- Aulus Licinius Archias - poet
- Arellius Fuscus - rhetor
- Arria Major - wife of Caecina Paetus
- Arria Minor - daughter of Arria Major
- Flavius Arrianus (Arrian) - historian
- Lucius Arruntius the Elder - consul
- Lucius Arruntius the Younger - his son, also a consul
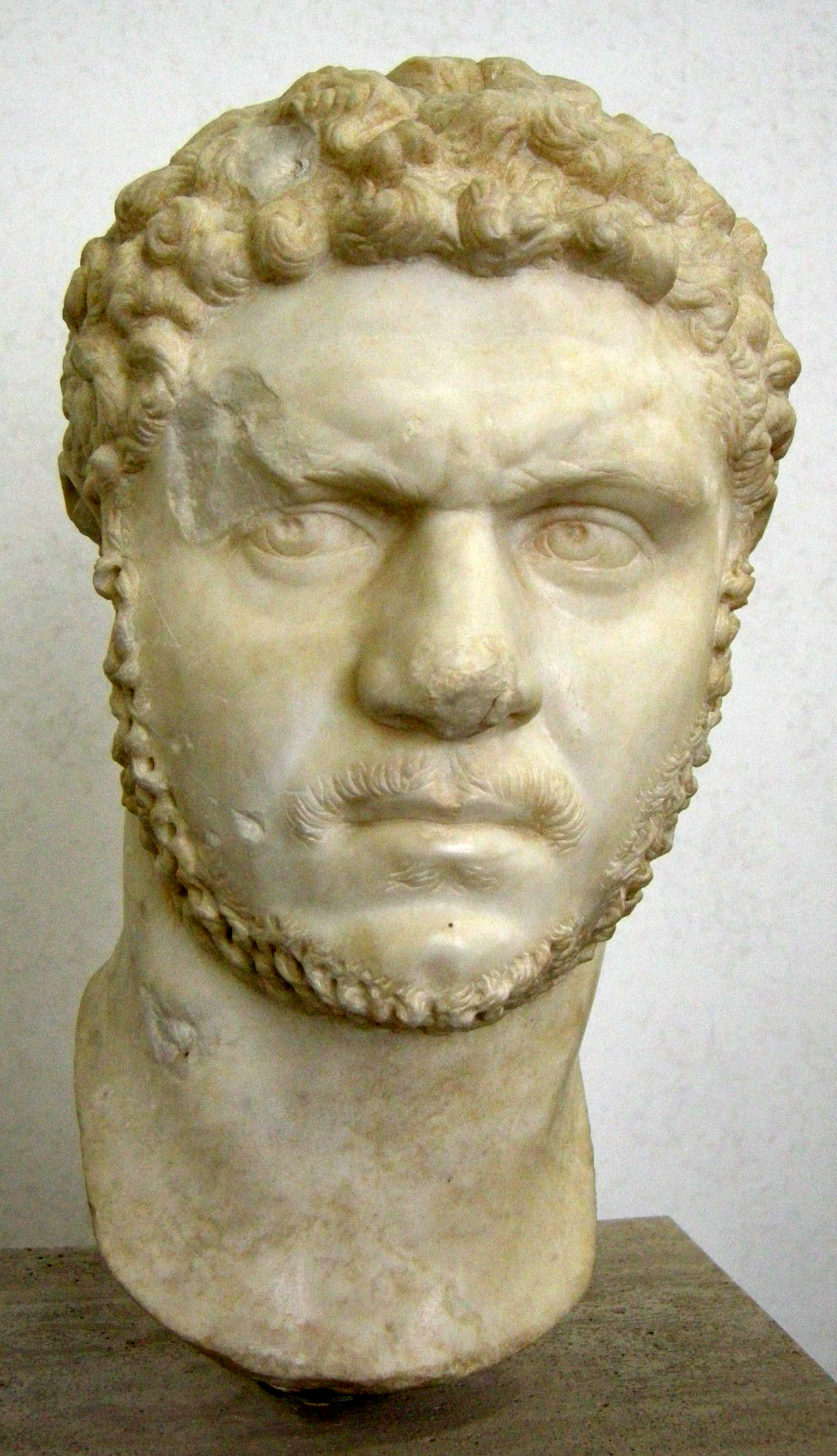
- Bust of Caracalla
  Lucius Arruntius Stella - poet
- Arruntius Celsus - miscellanist
- Lucius Artorius Castus - general in Britain, possible basis for King Arthur
- Quintus Junius Arulenus Rusticus - Stoic
- Arusianus Messius - grammarian
- Quintus Asconius Pedianus - writer
- Sempronius Asellio - historian
- Aemilius Asper - commentator
- Nonius Asprenas - two rhetors
- Lucius Ateius Praetextatus Philologus - scholar
- Atia - three Augustan women
- Aulus Atilius Caiatinus - consul
- Aulus Atilius Serranus - consul
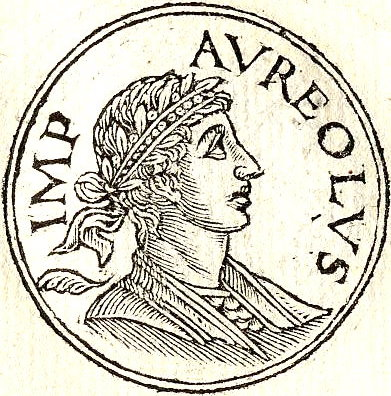
- Fictitious depiction of Aureolus
  Marcus Atilius - dramatist
- Atilius Fortunatianus - metrician
- Titus Quinctius Atta - poet
- Publius Acilius Attianus - adviser to Hadrian
- Caecilia Attica - wife of Agrippa
- Titus Pomponius Atticus - businessman and writer
- Julius Atticus - writer on vines
- Aufidius Bassus - historian
- Gnaeus Aufidius - praetor and historian
- Sentius Augurinus - friend of Pliny the Younger
- Augustus - emperor
- Aurelia - mother of Julius Caesar
- Lucius Domitius Aurelianus - emperor
- Marcus Aurelius - emperor
- Lucius Aurelius Marcianus - soldier
- Marcus Aurelius Antoninus (Caracalla) - emperor
- Sextus Aurelius Victor - historian
- Aureolus - soldier
- Decimus Magnus Ausonius - poet
- Publius Autronius Paetus - consul
- Titus Avidius Quietus - suffect consul
- Gaius Avidius Nigrinus - possible Hadrian successor
- Gaius Avidius Cassius - general
- Avienius - writer

== B ==
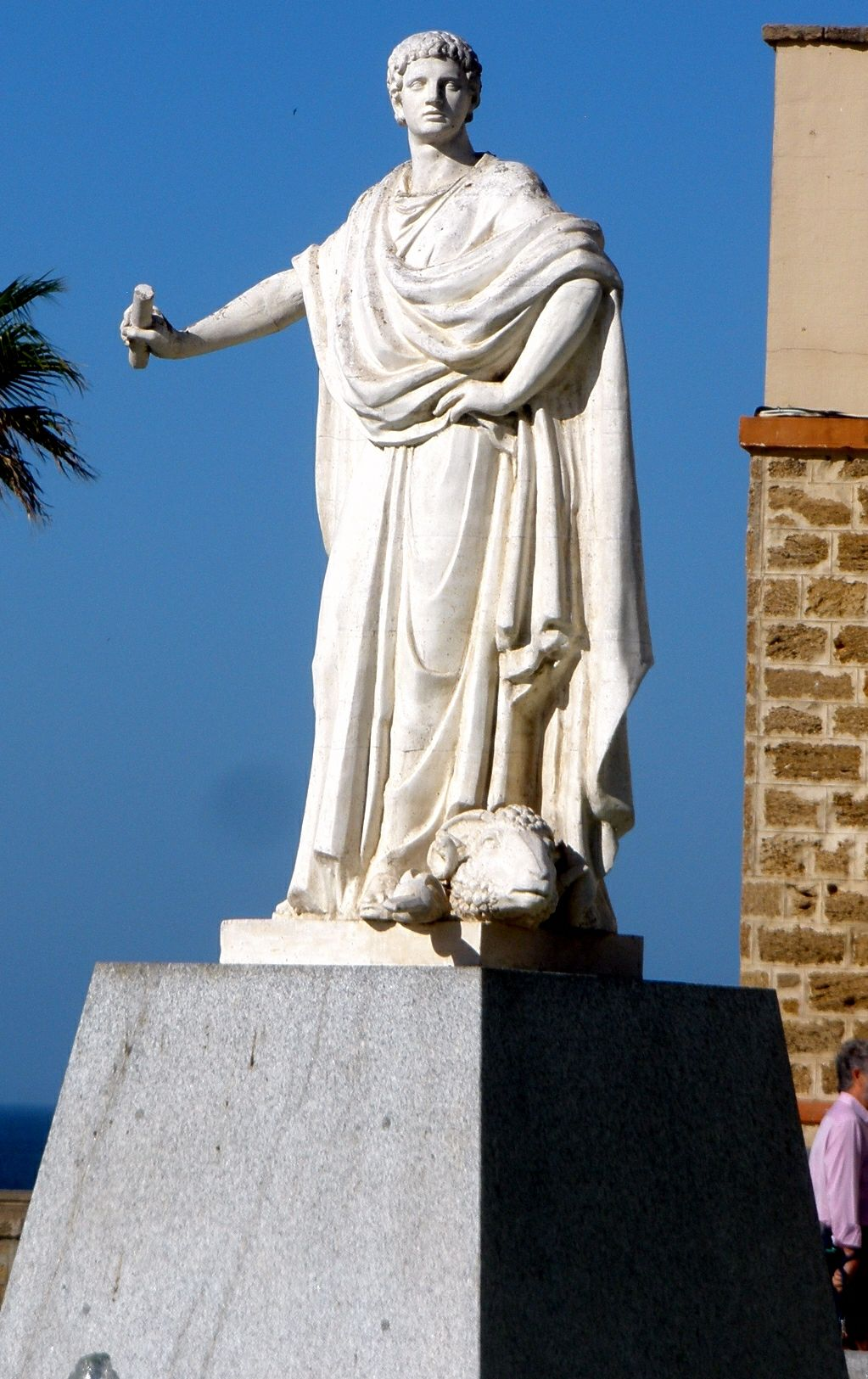
Statue of Lucius Cornelius Balbus the younger

- Gnaeus Baebius Tamphilus - consul
- Marcus Baebius Tamphilus - consul
- Quintus Baebius Tamphilus - praetor
- Tiberius Claudius Balbilus - astrologer
- Decius Caelius Calvinus Balbinus - senator/emperor
- Marcus Atius Balbus - praetor, married Julia Minor
- Titus Ampius Balbus - tribune and proconsul
- Lucius Cornelius Balbus (consul 40 BC) - consul
- Lucius Cornelius Balbus (proconsul) - consul's nephew
- Balbus - surveyor
- Balista - praetorian prefect of Valerian
- Quintus Marcius Barea Soranus - suffect consul
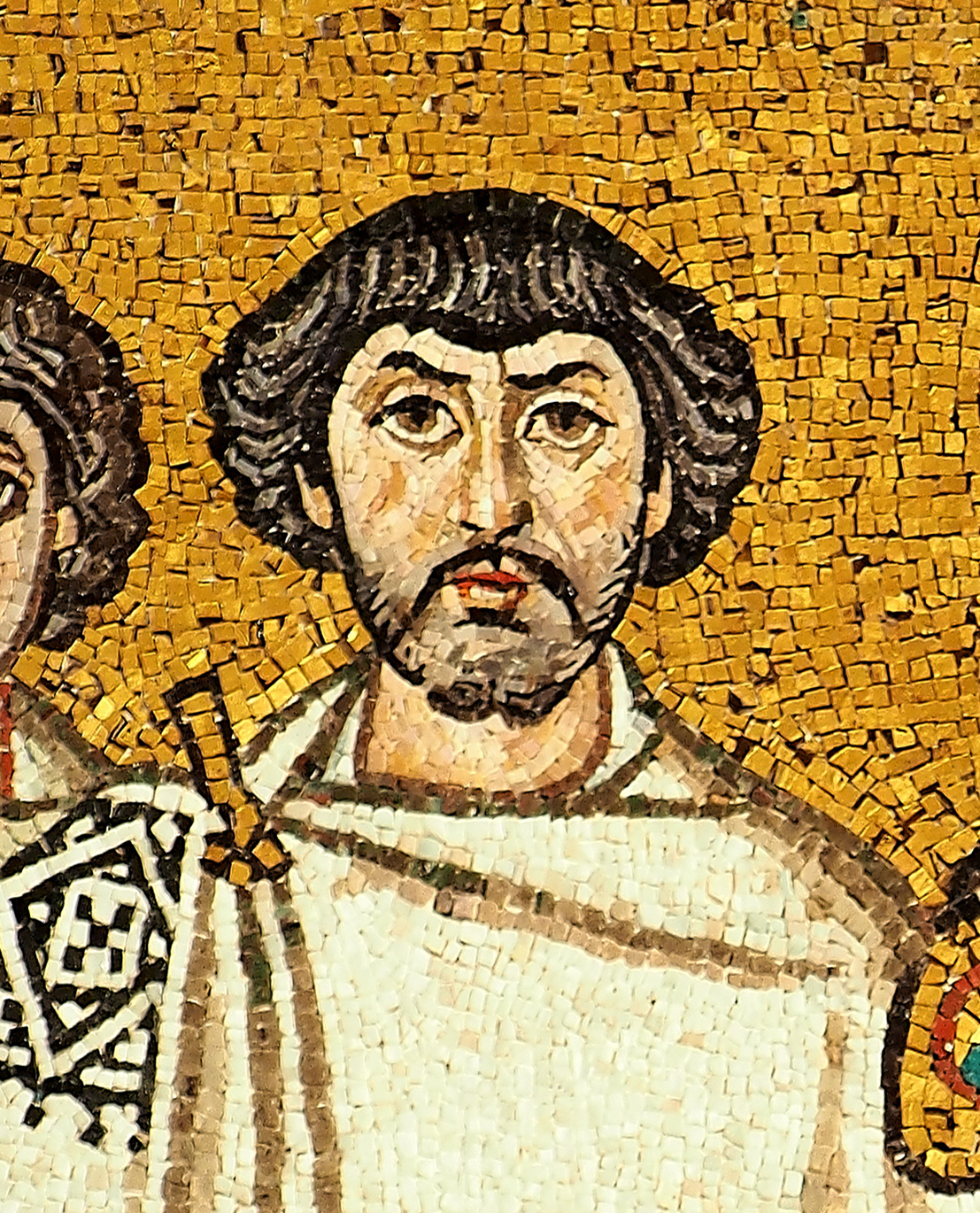
  Mosaic depicting Belisarius
- Quintus Caecilius Bassus - officer
- Caesius Bassus - poet
- Saleius Bassus - epic writer
- Bavius - bad poet mentioned by Virgil
- Belisarius - general
- Lucius Calpurnius Bestia - two; a consul and a tribune
- Marcus Furius Bibaculus - poet
- Marcus Calpurnius Bibulus - consul
- Quintus Junius Blaesus - suffect consul
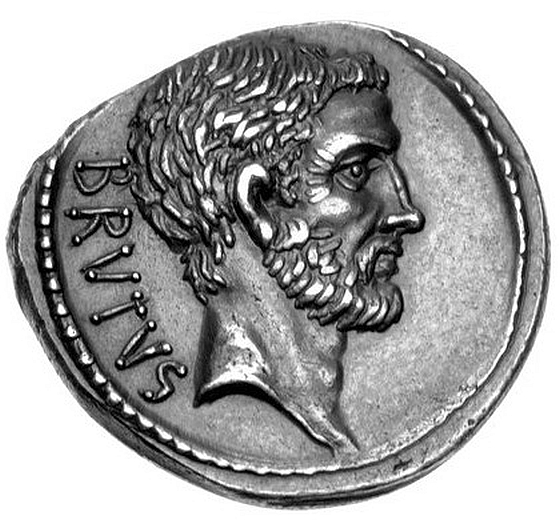
- Coin depicting Lucius Junius Brutus
  Gaius Blossius - philosophy student
- Anicius Manlius Severinus Boethius (Boethius) - consul, writer
- Vettius Bolanus - suffect consul
- Bonifacius - 4th-century governor of North Africa
- Bonosus - revolted against Probus
- Tiberius Claudius Caesar Britannicus (Britannicus) - son of Claudius
- Bruttidius Niger - aedile
- Lucius Junius Brutus - traditional founder of republic
- Decimus Junius Brutus - commander
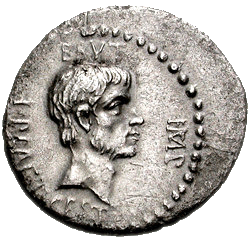
  Coin depicting Marcus Junius Brutus
- Decimus Junius Brutus Callaicus - consul
- Lucius Junius Brutus Damasippus - praetor
- Marcus Junius Brutus - plebeian tribune
- Marcus Junius Brutus - Assassin of Julius Caesar
- Sextus Afranius Burrus - procurator

== C ==
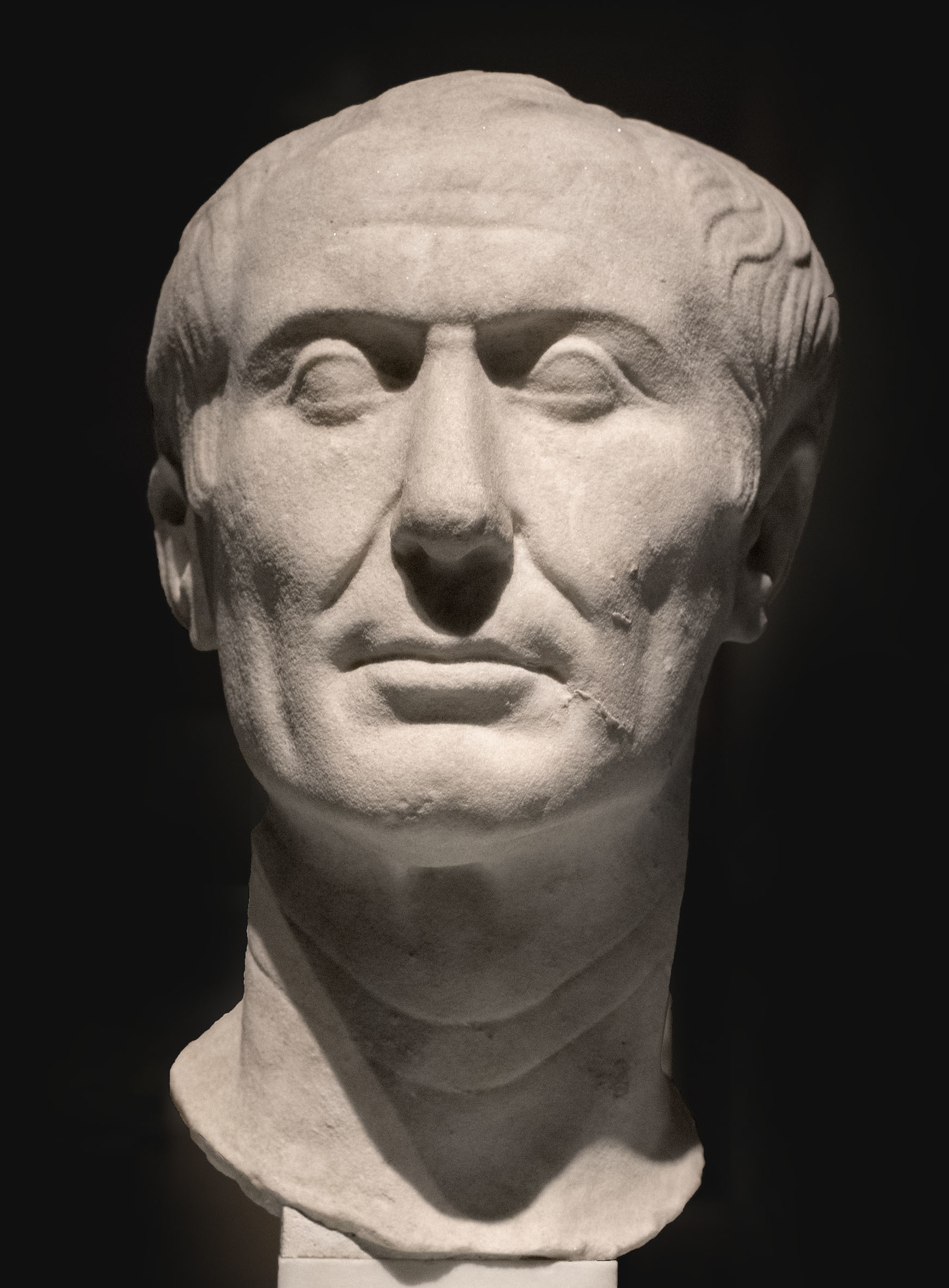
- Bust of Julius Caesar
  Caecilius of Novum Comum - poet
- Gaius Caecilius Classicus - Governor of Baetica
- Caecilus Statius - Gallic poet
- Quintus Caecilius Epirota - man of letters
- Lucius Caecilius Jucundus - banker in Pompeii
- Aulus Caecina Severus - friend of Cicero
- Aulus Caecina Severus - legate
- Aulus Caecina Alienus - suffect consul
- Marcus Caelius Rufus - aedile
- Quintus Servilius Caepio - several
- Fannius Caepio - conspirator
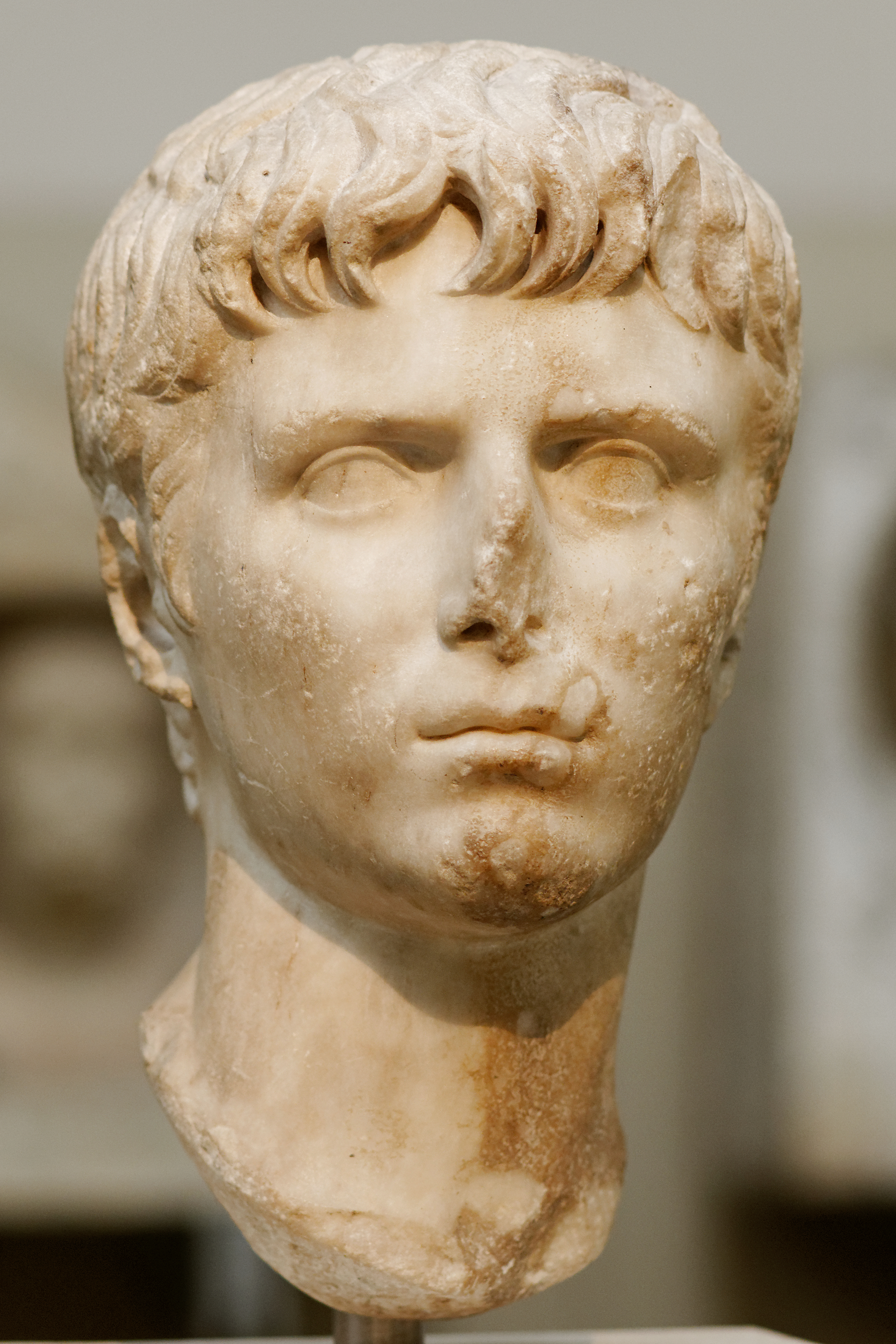
  Bust of Gaius Caesar
- Gaius Julius Caesar Strabo - orator
- Gaius Julius Caesar - dictator, historian, general, writer
- Lucius Julius Caesar - several related
- Sextus Julius Caesar - several related
- Gaius Caesar - consul
- Lucius Caesar - second son of Agrippa
- Marcus Calidius - praetor
- Gaius Julius Callistus - freedman
- Calpurnia - two; daughter of Piso, 3rd wife of Pliny
- Titus Calpurnius Siculus - writer
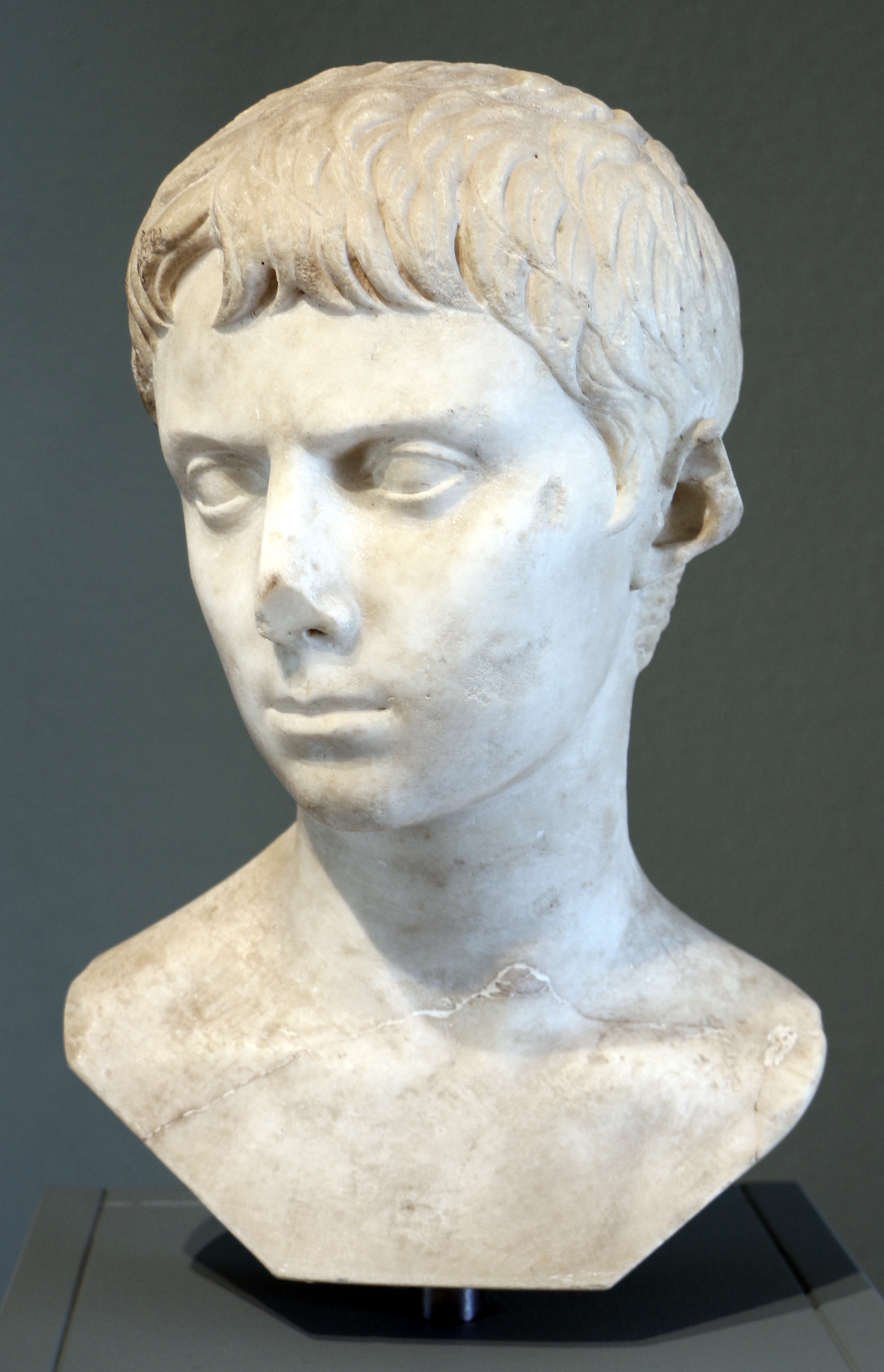
  Bust of Lucius Caesar
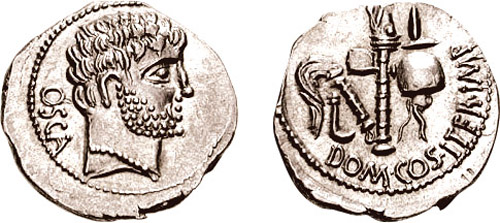
  Coin depicting Gnaeus Domitius Calvinus
- Calpurnius Flaccus - writer
- Gaius Calpurnius Aviola - consul and governor
- Gaius Sextius Calvinus - consul
- Gnaeus Domitius Calvinus - consul
- Gnaeus Domitius Corbulo - general, 1st century
- Gaius Calvisius Sabinus - consul in 39 BC
- Gaius Calvisius Sabinus - consul in 4 BC
- Gaius Calvisius Sabinus - consul in 26 AD
- Gaius Licinius Calvus - orator and poet
- Marcus Furius Camillus - heroic consul
- Lucius Furius Camillus - two; consul and son
- Publius Canidius Crassus - general
- Gaius Caninius Rebilus - briefly suffect consul
- Caninius Rufus - neighbor of Pliny
- Canius Rufus - poet
- Gaius Canuleius - plebeian tribune
- Flavius Caper - grammarian
- Gaius Ateius Capito - two; tribune, jurist
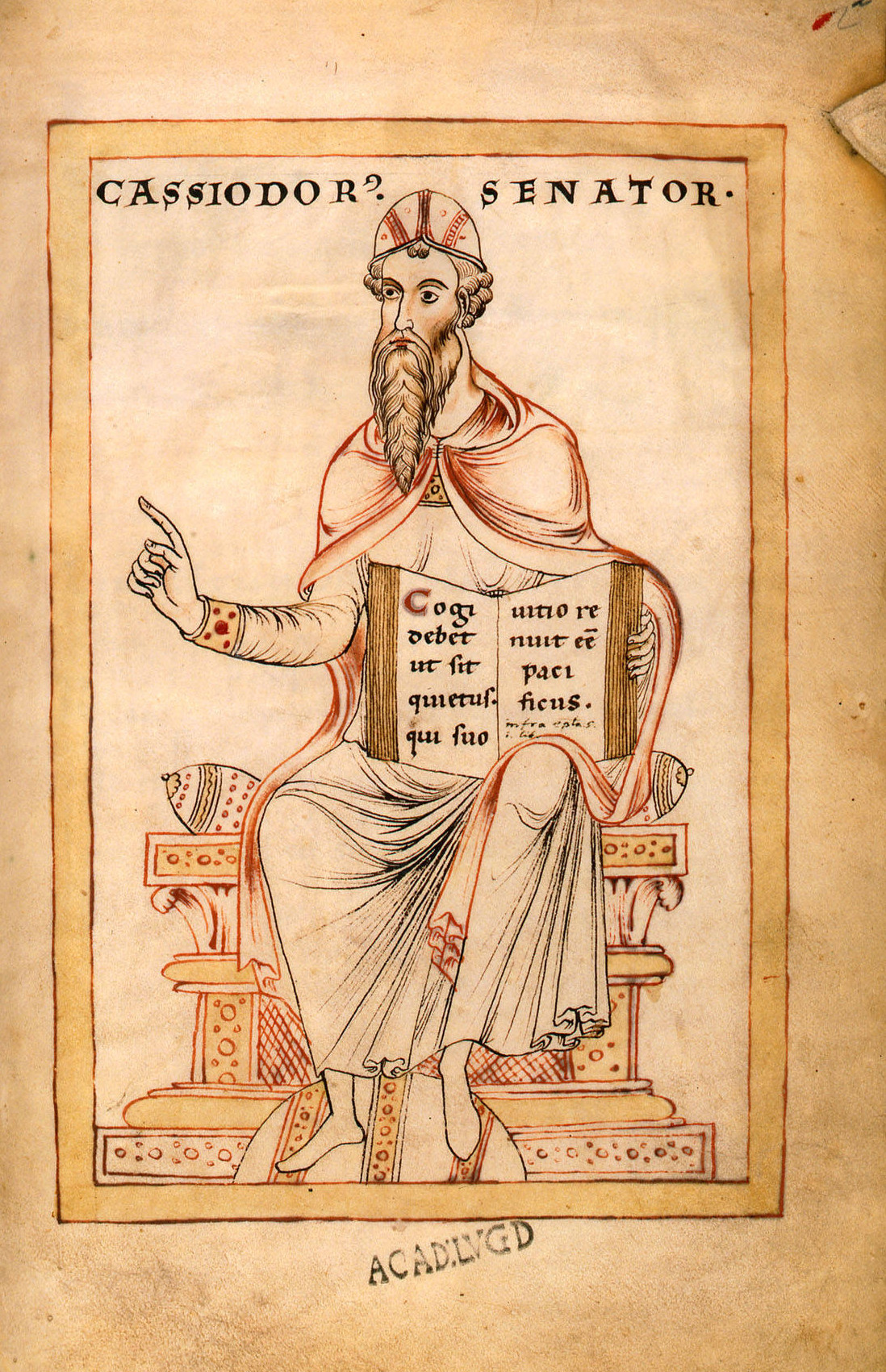
  Depiction of Cassiodorus from a manuscript
- Marcus Aurelius Maus Carausius - emperor
- Gaius Papirius Carbo - consul
- Gnaeus Papirius Carbo - consul
- Gaius Papirius Carbo Arvina - tribune
- Marcus Aurelius Carinus - emperor
- Gaius Carrinus - commander
- Marcus Aurelius Carus - emperor
- Spurius Carvilius Maximus - consul
- Spurius Carvilius Ruga - freedman and teacher
- Servilius Casca - two conspirators
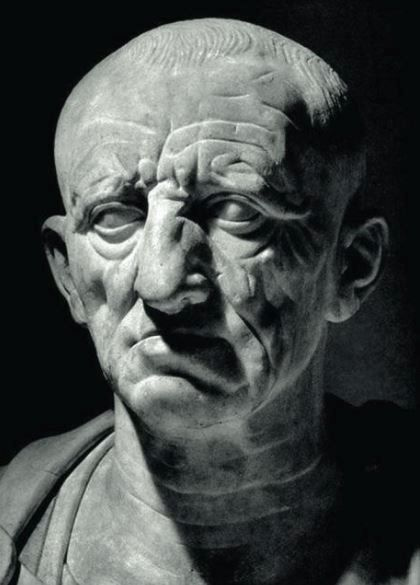
- Bust of Cato the Elder
  Cassiodorus - politician and writer
- Spurius Cassius Vecellinus - early consul
- Lucius Cassius Hemina - annalist
- Lucius Cassius Longinus Ravilla - consul
- Quintus Cassius Longinus - quaestor
- Gaius Cassius Longinus - tyrannicide
- Lucius Cassius Longinus - three; two consuls, one proconsul
- Cassius Parmensis - two; jurist and tyrannicide
- Cassius Severus - orator
- Cassius Chaerea - centurion
- Lucius Artorius Castus - general in Britain, possible basis for King Arthur
- Lucius Sergius Catilina (Catiline) - conspirator
- Titus Catius - writer
- Cato, Marcus Porcius - the Elder, censor
- Cato, Marcus Porcius - the Younger, politician, leader of the conservative faction
- Gaius Porcius Cato - two; consul, tribune
- Lucius Porcius Cato - consul
- Catullus - writer and poet
- Gaius Lutatius Catulus - consul
- Quintus Lutatius Catulus - two; consul and son
- Celsus Albinovanus - friend of Horace
- Aulus Cornelius Celsus - encyclopedist
- Publius Juventius Celsus - consul
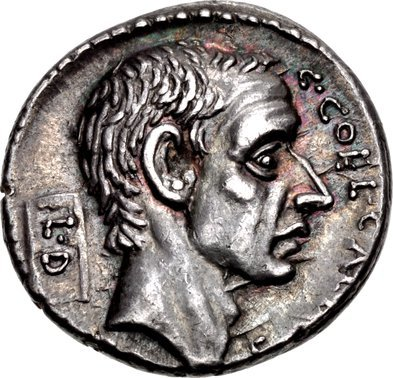
  Coin depicting Gaius Coelius Caldus
- Censorinus - grammarian
- Quintus Petillius Cerialis - consul
- Gaius Cestius Epulo - praetor
- Gaius Cestius Gallus - consul
- Lucius Cestius Pius - rhetor
- Publius Cornelius Cethegus, politician and consul
- Publius Cornelius Cethegus, politician and senator
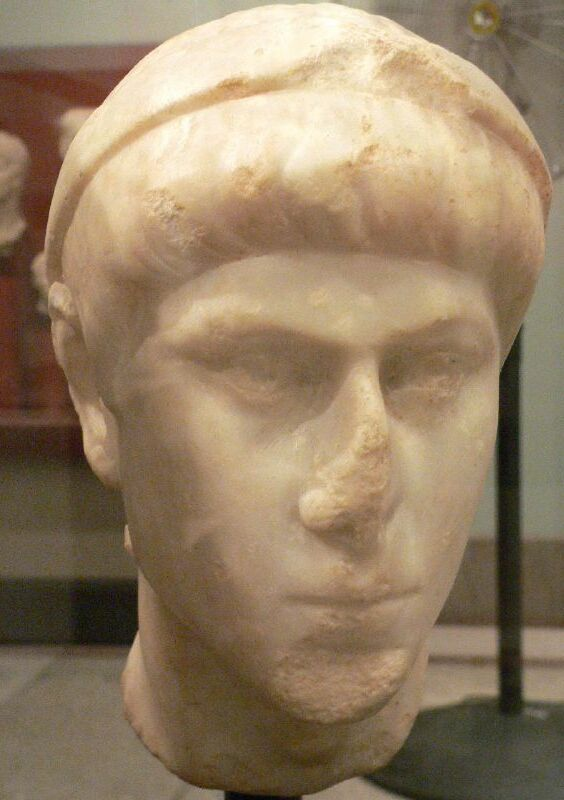
- Bust depicting Constantius II
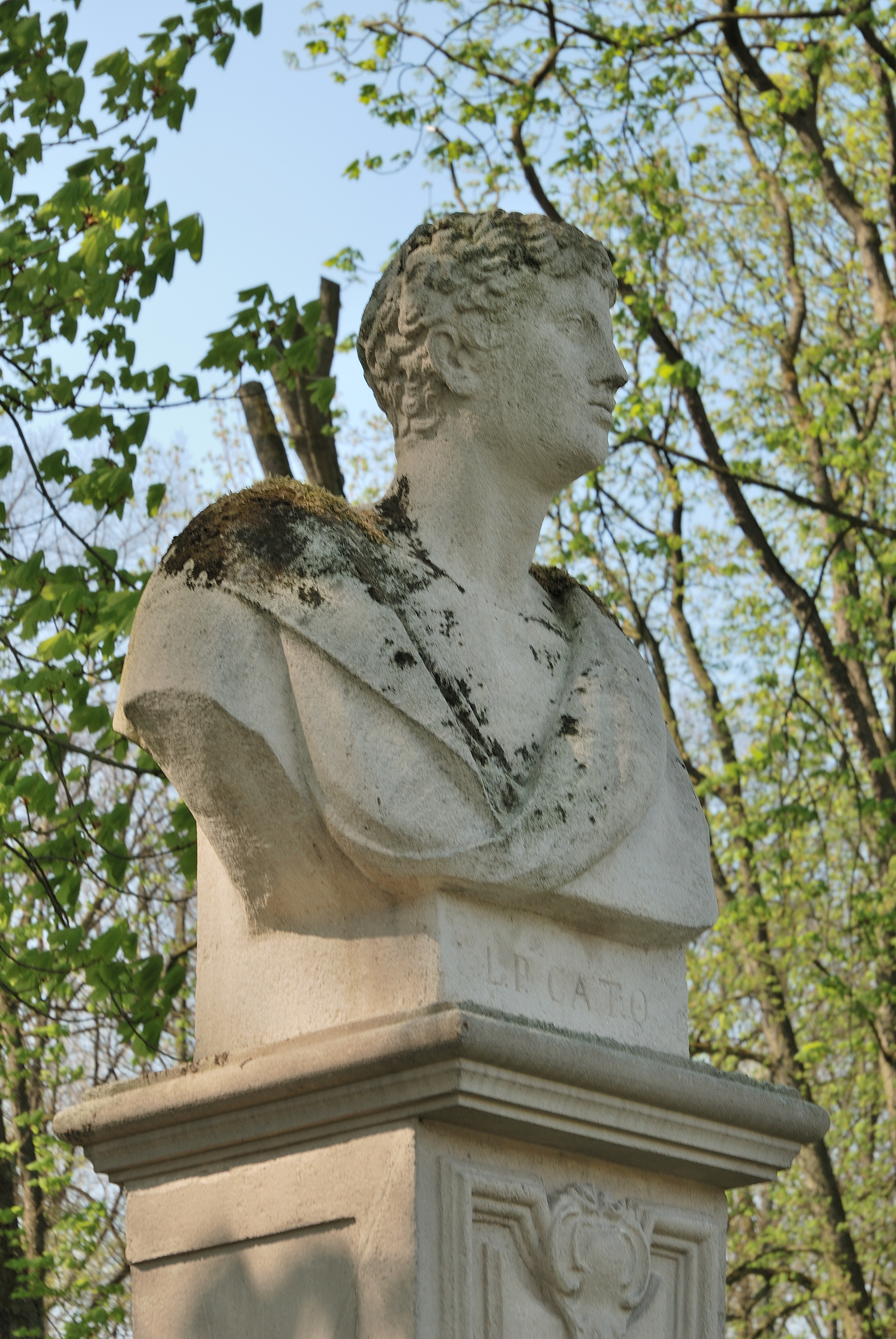
  Bust depicting Lucius Porcius Cato
  Flavius Sosipater Charisius - grammarian
- Lucius Cornelius Chrysogonus - freedman
- Marcus Tullius Cicero - two; politician/writer and son
- Quintus Tullius Cicero - two; younger brother of Cicero and son
- Lucius Fabius Cilo - governor
- Lucius Tillius Cimber - senator and conspirator
- Lucius Quinctius Cincinnatus - early hero
- Lucius Cincius Alimentus - senator and historian
- Lucius Cornelius Cinna - two; politician and son
- Gaius Helvius Cinna - poet
- Gnaeus Cornelius Cinna Magnus - consul
- Gaius Julius Civilis - noble Batavian
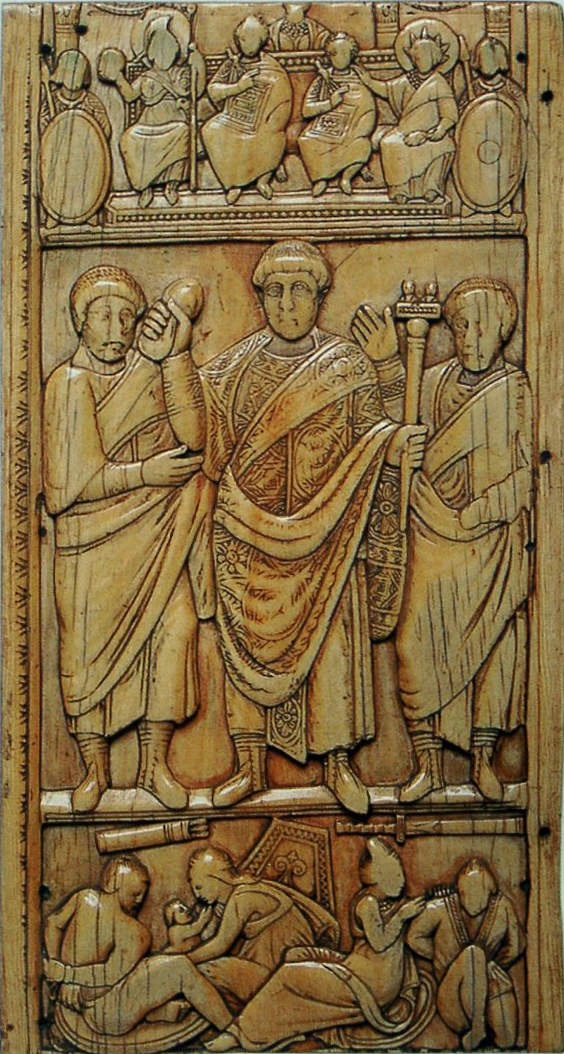
- Diptych depicting Constantius III
  Gaius Julius Alpinus Classicianus - procurator
- Julius Classicus - rebel Treveri
- Claudius Claudianus (Claudian) - poet
- Claudius - emperor
- Claudia Procula - wife of Pontius Pilate
- Claudius II Gothicus - emperor
- Appius Claudius Crassus - decemvir
- Appius Claudius Caecus - consul
- Appius Claudius Caudex - consul
- Publius Claudius Pulcher - several
- Quintus Claudius - plebeian tribune
- Gaius Claudius Pulcher - consul
- Appius Claudius Pulcher - three consuls
- Marcus Claudius Marcellus Aeserninus - orator and consul
- Quintus Claudius Quadrigarius - annalist
- Tiberius Claudius - procurator
- Claudius Etruscus - son of Tiberius Claudius
- Tiberius Claudius Pompeianus - consul
- Claudius Mamertinus - orator
- Titus Flavius Clemens (consul) - consul
- Clodia - sister of Publius Clodius Pulcher
- Clodius Aesopus - tragic actor
- Publius Clodius Pulcher - politician
- Lucius Clodius Macer - legate
- Publius Clodius Quirinalis - rhetor
- Decimus Clodius Albinus - would-be emperor
- Cloelia - legendary hostage
- Aulus Cluentius Habitus - litigant
- Lucius Coelius Antipater - jurist, rhetorician, and historian
- Gaius Coelius Caldus - consul
- Lucius Junius Moderatus Columella - farmer
- Cominianus - grammarian
- Commodianus - Christian Latin poet
- Lucius Aelius Aurelius Commodus - emperor
- Constans - emperor
- Flavius Valerius Constantinus (Constantine) - emperor
- Constantine II - emperor
- Flavius Claudius Constantinus - emperor
- Flavius Valerius Constantius (Chlorus) - emperor
- Constantius II - emperor
- Constantius III - emperor
- Gnaeus Domitius Corbulo - consul
- Gnaeus Marcius Coriolanus - early hero
- Cornelia Africana - mother of Tiberius and Gaius Gracchus
- Cornelia - Caesar's first wife
- Cornelia Metella - wife of Pompey
- Gaius Cornelius - tribune
- Cornelius Severus - poet
- Lucius Cornificius - consul
- Quintus Cornificius - orator and poet
- Constantius Chlorus - Father of Constantine I.
- Constantine the Great - Roman Emperor
- Lucius Annaeus Cornutus - freedman teacher
- Gaius Julius Cornutus Tertullus - proconsul
- Gaius Coruncanius - ambassador
- Lucius Coruncanius - ambassador
- Tiberius Coruncanius - consul
- Titus Statilius Taurus Corvinus - consul
- Quintus Conconius - scholar
- Aulus Cornelius Cossus - consul
- Gaius Aurelius Cotta - consul
- Lucius Aurelius Cotta - five different
- Marcus Aurelius Cotta - consul
- Marcus Julius Cottius - son of a native king
- Gaius Calpurnius Crassus Frugi Licinianus - suffect consul
- Publius Licinius Crassus Dives Mucianus - consul
- Lucius Licinius Crassus - consul
- Marcus Licinius Crassus - two; politician and grandson
- Publius Licinius Crassus - two; consul and commander
- Aulus Cremutius Cordus - historian
- Quintus Terentius Culleo - praetor
- Curiatius Maternus - senator and poet
- Marcus Curtius - legendary hero
- Curtius Montanus - poet
- Thascius Caecilius Cyprianus (Cyprian) - bishop

== D ==
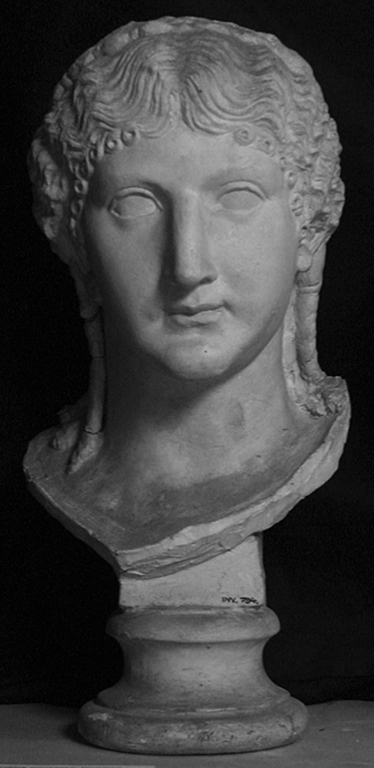
Bust of Julia Drusilla

- Damophilus - sculptor
- Lucius Decidius Saxa - tribune
- Gaius Messius Quintus Decius - emperor
- Publius Decius Mus - three consuls
- Publius Decius Subulo - praetor
- Quintus Dellius - soldier, writer
- Sempronius Densus - soldier
- Lucius Siccius Dentatus - early hero
- Manius Curius Dentatus - consul
- Publius Herennius Dexippus - sophist
- Lucius Pollentius Dexter - soldier (Legio I Adiutrix, Centuria Allii Marini)
- Titus Didius - consul
- Marcus Didius Julianus - short-lived emperor
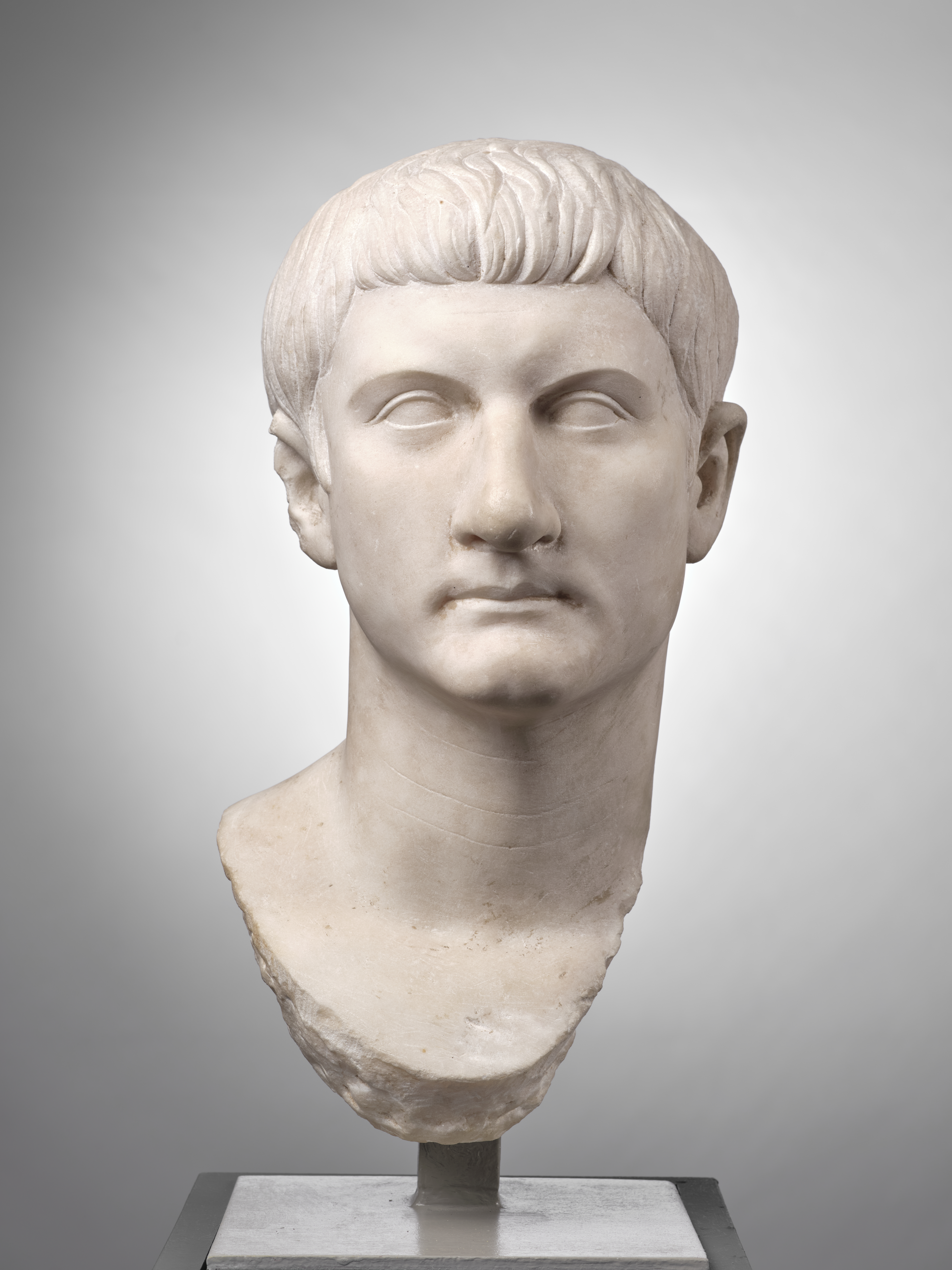
- Bust of Drusus Julius Caesar
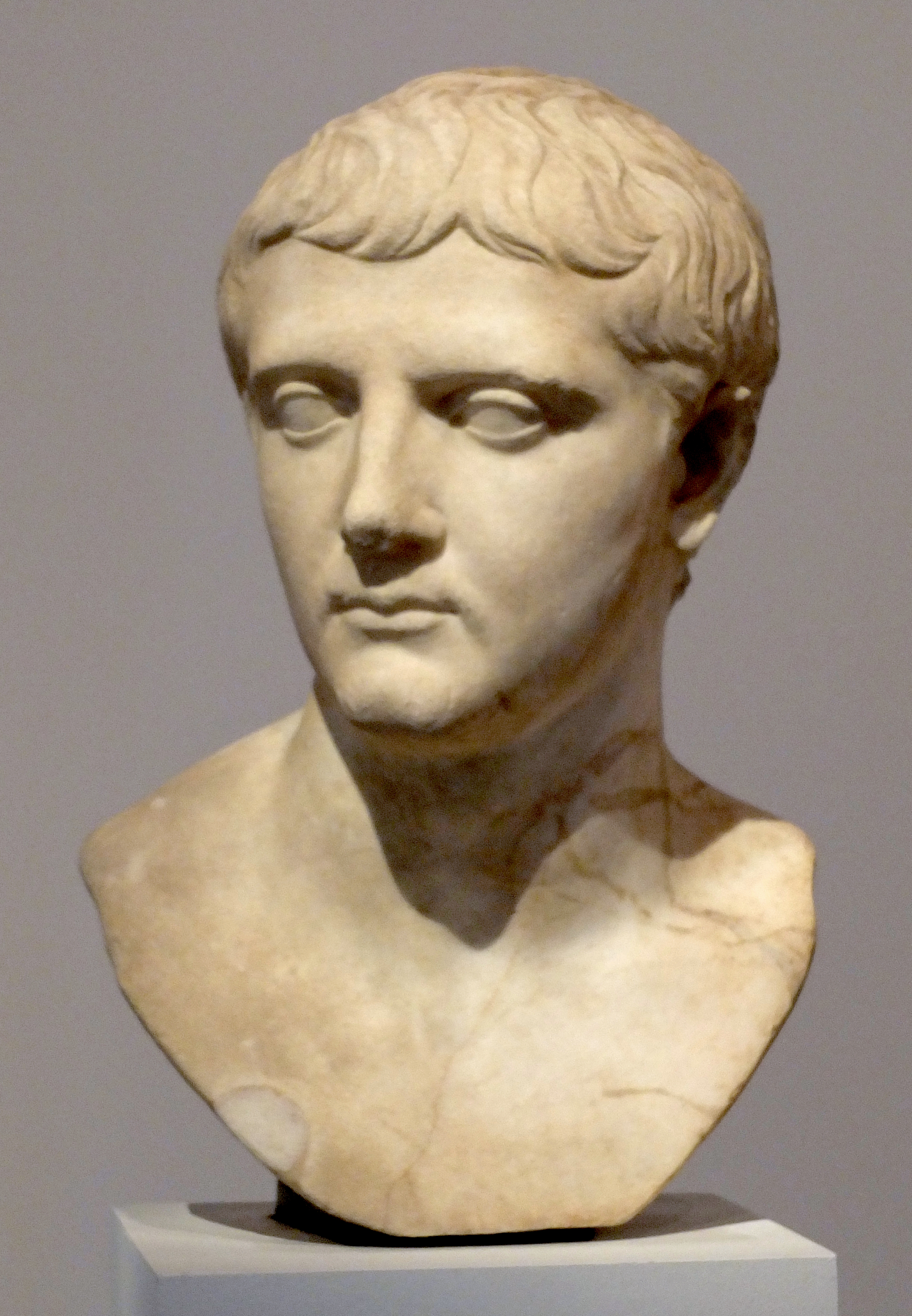
  Bust of Nero Claudius Drusus
  Dio Cassius - official and historian
- Gaius Aurelius Valerius Diocletianus (Diocletian) - emperor
- Dioscorides Pedanius - physician
- Gnaeus Cornelius Dolabella - two; consul and proconsul
- Publius Cornelius Dolabella - two consuls
- Titus Flavius Domitianus (Domitian) - two; emperor and adopted son
- Flavia Domitilla - mother / sister / niece of Domitian
- Gnaeus Domitius Ahenobarbus - four different
- Lucius Domitius Ahenobarbus - two
- Domitius Marsus - poet
- Aelius Donatus - grammarian
- Tiberius Claudius Donatus - commentator
- Dorotheus - framed Justinian Code
- Blossius Aemilius Dracontius - poet and rhetor
- Julia Drusilla - daughter of Caligula
- Drusus Julius Caesar - two; son of Tiberius and son of Germanicus
- Nero Claudius Drusus - general
- Marcus Livius Drusus - two; consul and son
- Marcus Livius Drusus Claudianus - a praetor
- Gaius Duilius - consul

== E ==
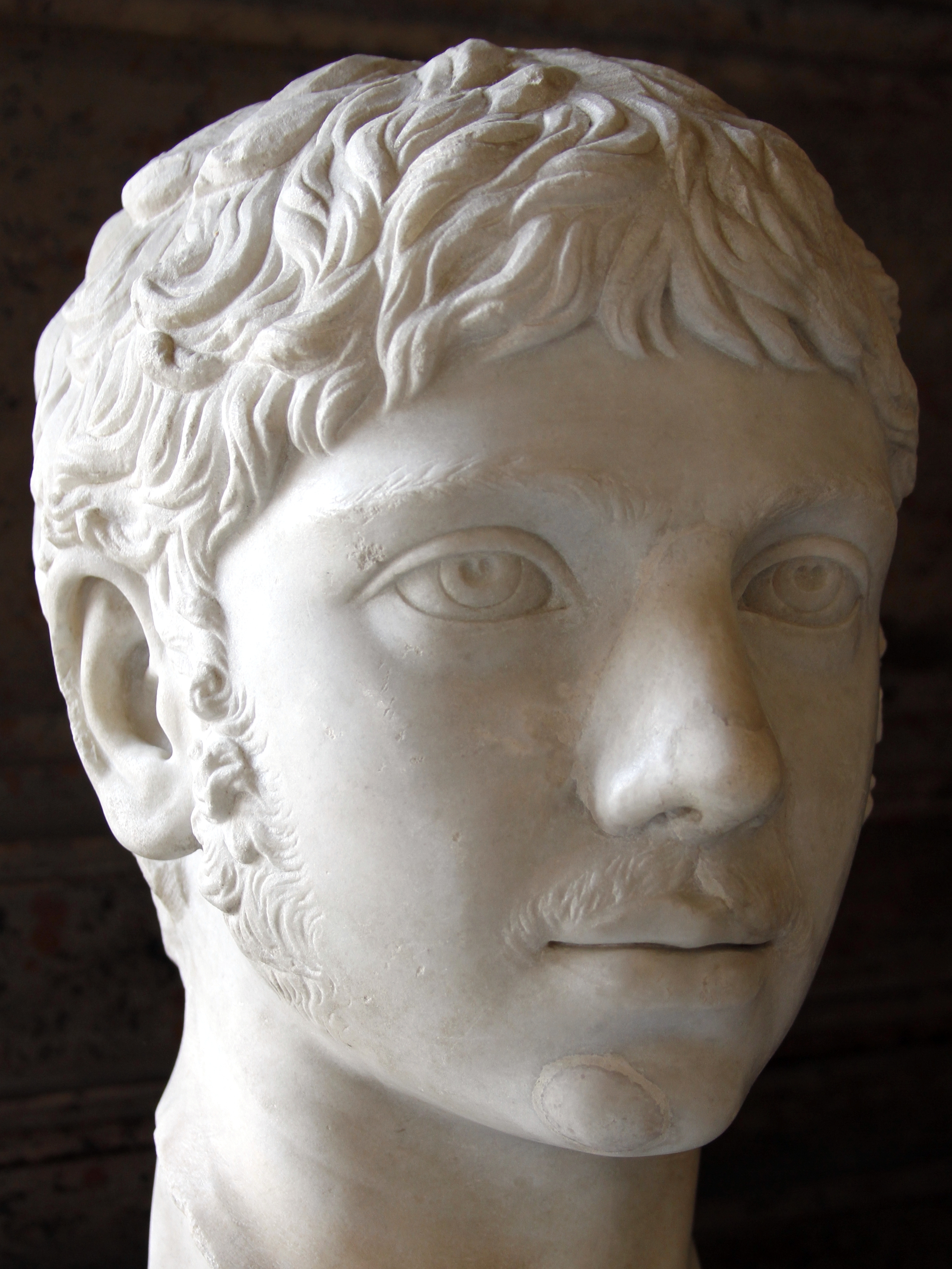
- Bust of Elagabalus
  Marcus Egnatius Rufus - praetor
- Elagabalus - emperor
- Emporius - rhetorician
- Empylus - rhetorician
- Sextilius Ena - poet
- Severus Sanctus Endelechius - professor
- Quintus Ennius - writer
- Magnus Felix Ennodius - bishop, writer
- Epagathus - politician
- Titus Eppius Latinus - procurator
- Titus Clodius Eprius Marcellus - consul
- Erotian - grammarian, doctor
- Sextus Erucius Clarus - official and friend of Pliny
- Flavius Eugenius - usurper
- Eucheria - poet, satirist
- Eumenius - teacher of rhetoric
- Eusebius of Caesarea - theologian
- Eutropius - historian
- Iulius Exsuperantius - historian

== F ==
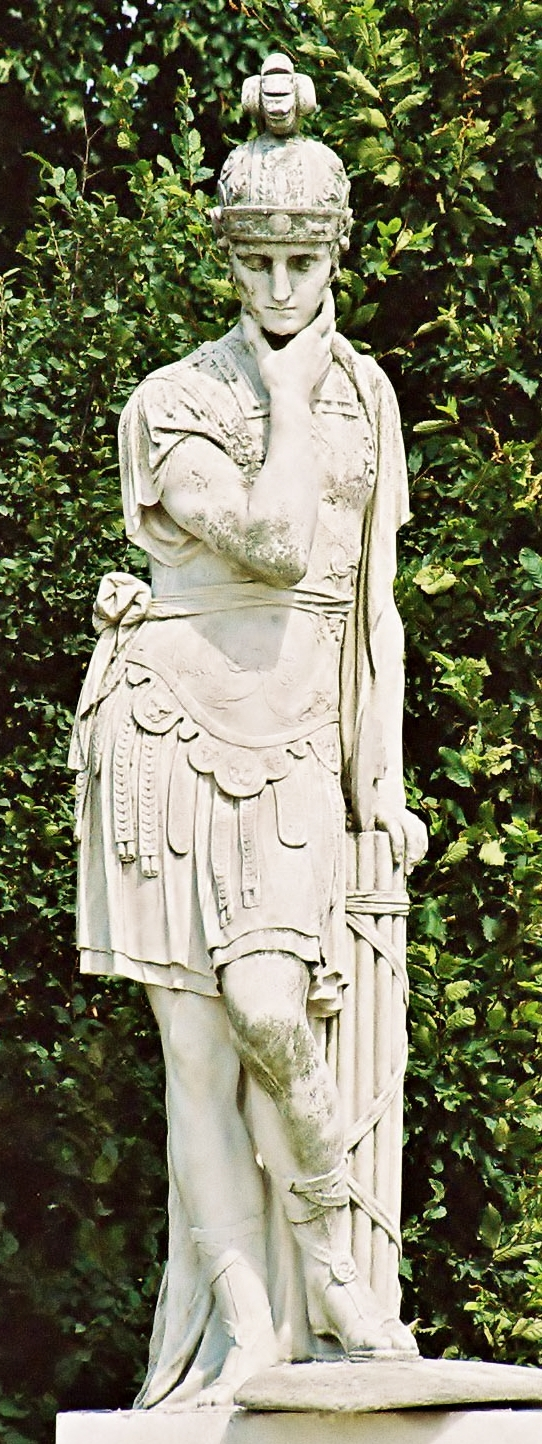
- Statue of Quintus Fabius Maximus Verrucosus
  Faberius - secretary to Julius Caesar
- Fabianus Papirius - philosopher
- Marcus Fabius Ambustus - consul
- Quintus Fabius Ambustus - official
- Marcus Fabius Buteo - consul
- Lucius Fabius Justus - consul
- Paullus Fabius Maximus - consul
- Quintus Fabius Maximus Allobrogicus - praetor
- Quintus Fabius Maximus Aemilianus - consul
- Quintus Fabius Maximus Rullianus - consul
- Quintus Fabius Maximus Verrucosus, Cunctator - consul
- Quintus Fabius Pictor - senator, historian
- Fabius Rusticus - historian
- Gaius Fabricius Luscinus - consul
- Marcus Fadius Gallus - friend of Cicero
- Gaius Fannius - consul
- Annia Galeria Faustina - two; wife and daughter of Antoninus Pius
- Marcus Cetius Faventinus - scholar
- Eulogius Favonius - rhetor
- Marcus Favonius - politician
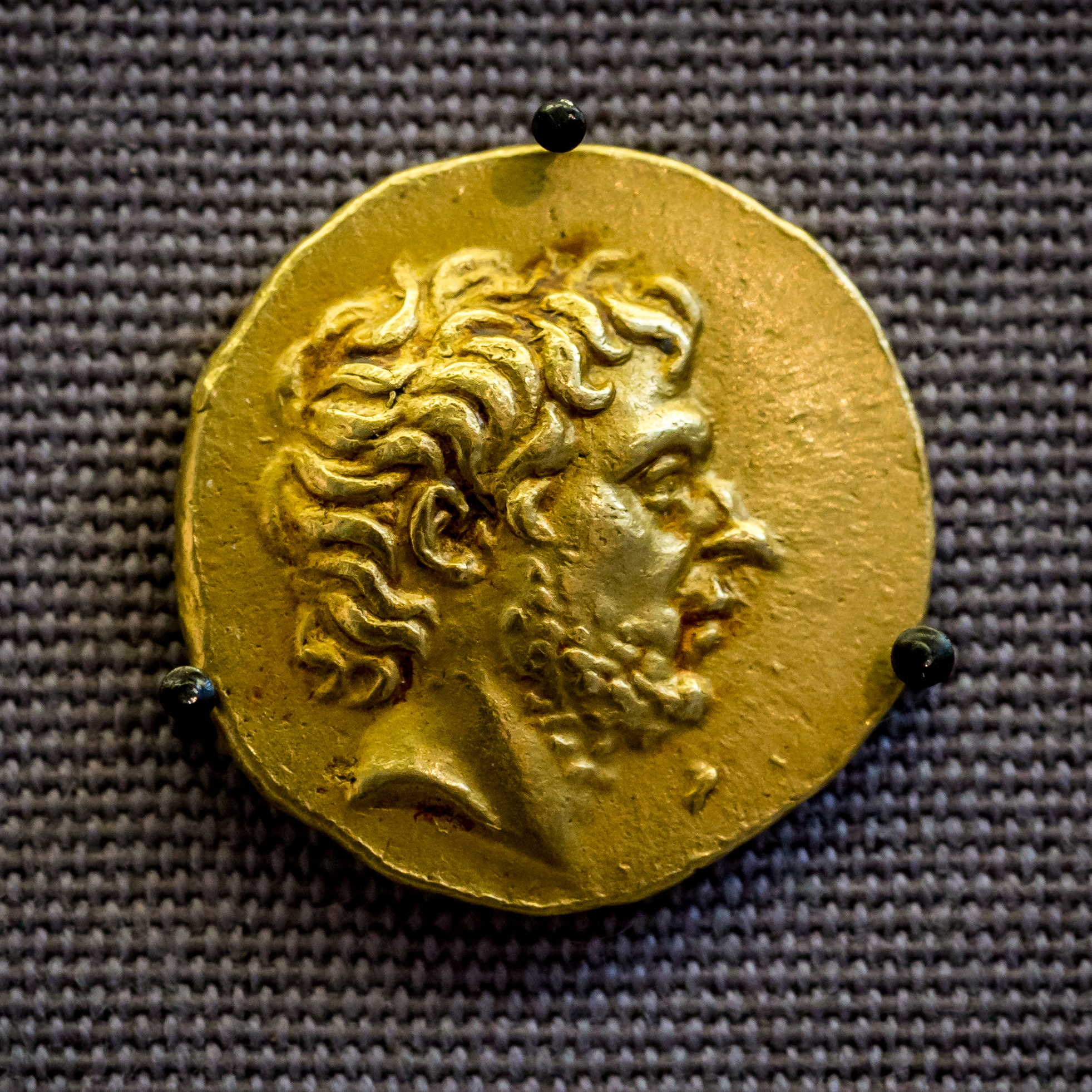
- Coin depicting Titus Quinctius Flaminius
  Favorinus - rhetor
- Marcus Antonius Felix - freedman procurator
- Fenestella - annalist
- Porcius Festus - procurator
- Rufius Festus - writer
- Sextus Pompeius Festus - scholar
- Gaius Flavius Fimbria - consul
- Julius Firmicus Maternus - astrologer
- Aulus Avilius Flaccus - official
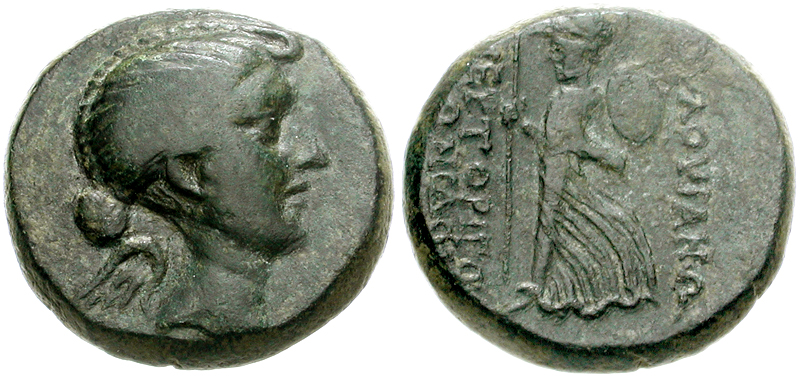
- Coin depicting Fulvia Antonia
  Quintus Fulvius Flaccus two; consul and son
- Lucius Valerius Flaccus four
- Marcus Fulvius Flaccus - consul
- Verrius Flaccus - freedman scholar
- Lucius Quinctius Flamininus - consul
- Titus Quinctius Flamininus - consul
- Gaius Flaminius - consul
- Gnaeus Flavius - writer
- Flavius Felix - poet
- Titus Flavius Petro - grandfather of Vespasian
- Marcus Annius Florianus - short-lived emperor
- Florus - poet
- Marcus Fonteius - official
- Sextus Julius Frontinus - writer
- Marcus Cornelius Fronto - orator
- Quintus Fufius Calenus - consul
- Fabius Planciades Fulgentius - writer
- Fulvia - wife of Mark Antony
- Gaius Fundanius - comedian
- Minicius Fundanus - proconsul
- Aulus Furius Antias - poet
- Lucius Furius Philus - consul
- Cornelius Fuscus - official and general

== G ==
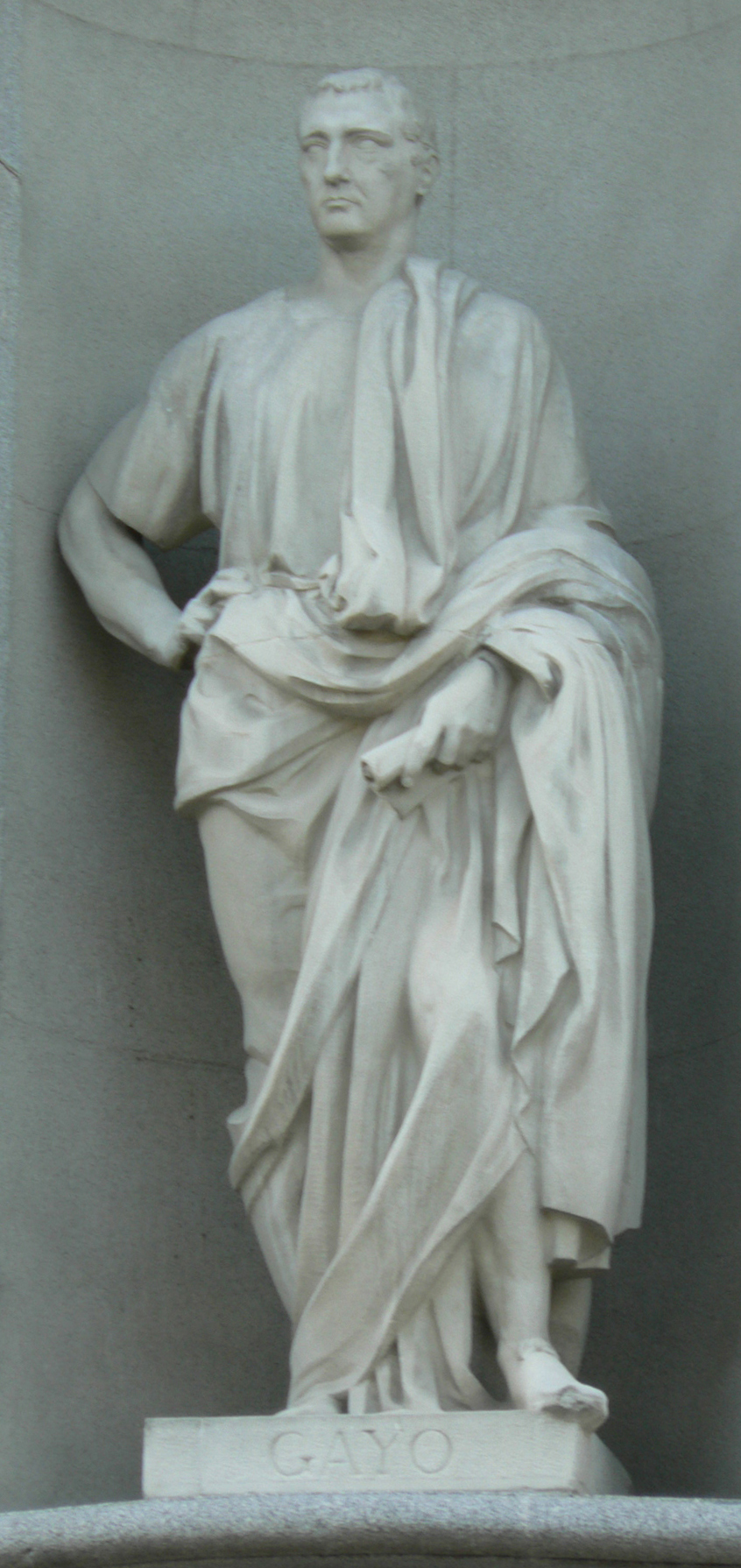
- Statue of the Roman jurist Gaius
  Aulus Gabinius - two; tribune and consul
- Gaius Julius Caesar Germanicus (Caligula) - emperor
- Gaius - jurist
- Gaius Sulpicius Galba - two; official, grandfather of emperor
- Servius Sulpicius Galba - four; two consuls, praetor, emperor
- Publius Sulpicius Galba Maximus - consul
- Gaius Galerius Valerius Maximinianus (Galerius) - emperor
- Galerius Trachalus - orator
- Publius Licinius Egnatius Gallienus (Gallienus) - emperor
- Lucius Iunius Gallio Annaeanus - consul
- Aelius Gallus - official
- Appius Annius Trebonius Gallus - consul of 108
- Appius Annius Trebonius Gallus - consul of 139
- Gaius Asinius Gallus - consul
- Gaius Cornelius Gallus - poet and general
- Aulus Didius Gallus - consul
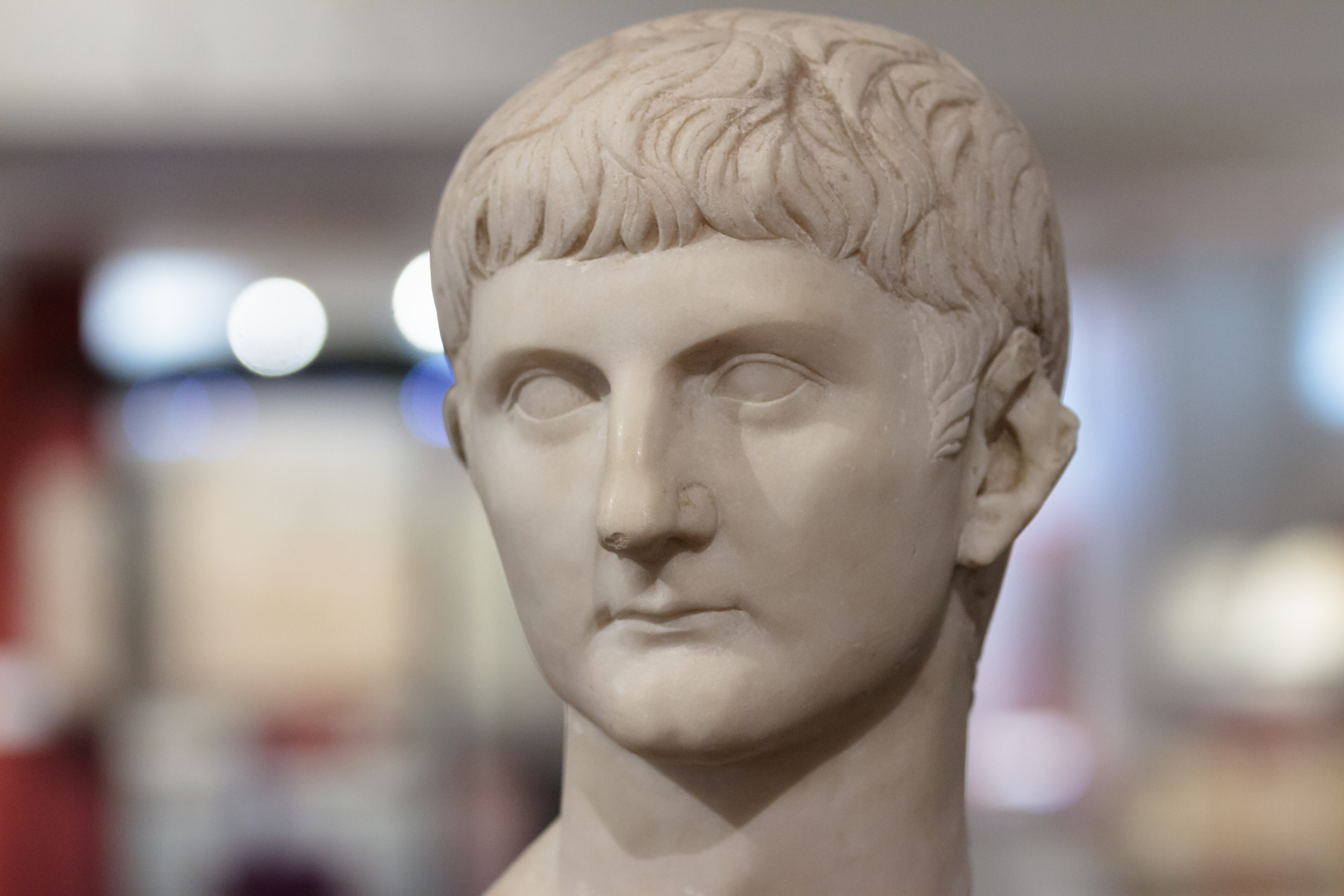
  Bust of Germanicus
- Gaius Lucretius Gallus - praetor
- Gaius Sulpicius Gallus - astronomer and consul
- Gallus Caesar - ruled in Antioch
- Quintus Gargilius Martialis - writer
- Gavius Bassus - writer
- Gavius Silo - orator
- Aulus Gellius - writer
- Gnaeus Gellius - annalist
- Lucius Gellius Poplicola - consul
- Geminus - writer
- Lucius Genucius - tribune
- Germanicus - general, father of Caligula
- Gessius Florus - procurator in Judea
- Hosidius Geta - writer
- Gnaeus Hosidius Geta - suffect consul
- Publius Septimius Geta (Geta) - emperor
- Gaius Servilius Glaucia - praetor
- Glitius Atilius Agricola - general of Trajan
- Marcus Antonius Gnipho - scholar
- Marcus Antonius Gordianus - three emperors
- Gaius Sempronius Gracchus - 2nd-century BC politician
- Tiberius Sempronius Gracchus - three politicians
- Julius Graecinus - praetor
- Granius Licinianus - writer
- Flavius Gratian - emperor
- Grattius - poet
- Grillius - grammarian

== H ==
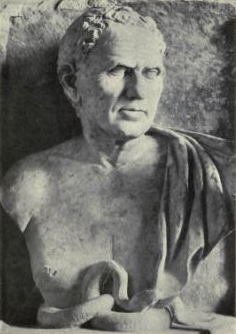
Bust of Quintus Haterius

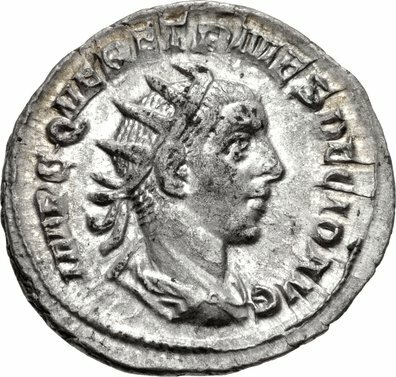
Coin depicting Herennius Etruscus

- Publius Aelius Hadrianus (Hadrian) - emperor
- Quintus Haterius - orator
- Helvidius Priscus - praetor
- Herennius Etruscus - short-lived emperor
- Herennius Modestinus - jurist
- Herennius Senecio - governor
- Herodes Atticus - consul and writer
- Aulus Hirtius - consul
- Honorius (emperor) - emperor
- Horatius Cocles - early hero
- Quintus Horatius Flaccus (Horace) - writer
- Quintus Hortensius - consul
- Hostilian - short-lived emperor
- Hostius - poet
- Hyginus - three writers
- Gaius Julius Hyginus - writer

== I ==
- Lucius Icilius - early hero
- Irenaeus - theologian
- Flavia Seia Isaurica – businesswoman
- Isidorus Hispalensis - bishop and scholar
- Isigonus - writer

== J ==
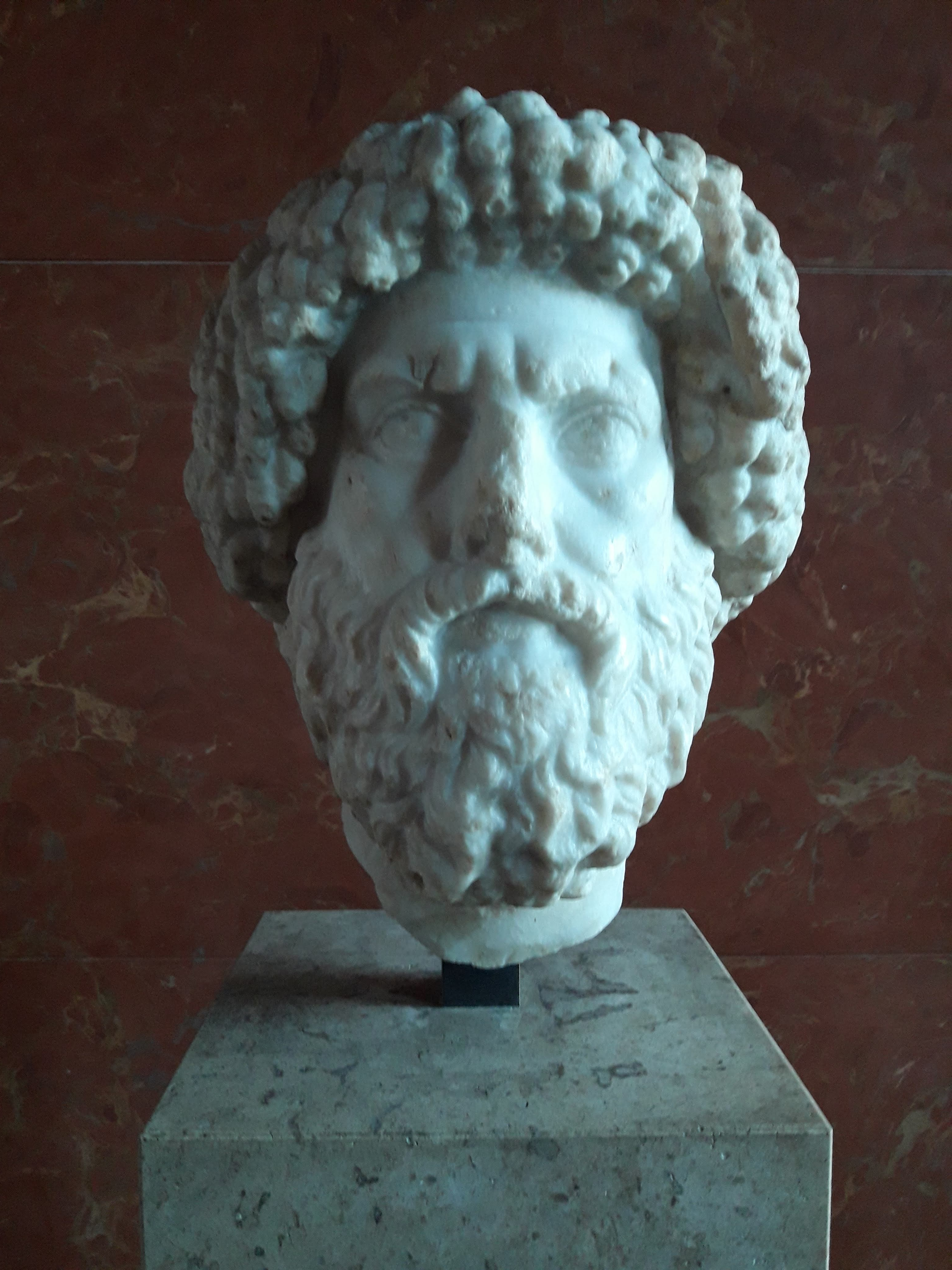
- Bust of Juba I of Numidia
  Januarius Nepotianus - writer
- Javolenus Priscus - jurist
- Jordanes - historian
- Flavius Jovian - emperor
- Juba I of Numidia - Numidian king
- Juba II of Numidia - Numidian king
- Juba (Roman metrician) - Mauretanian writer
- Jugurtha - Numidian king
- Julia (aunt of Caesar and wife of Marius)
- Julia (daughter of Julius Caesar)
- Julia - several women of the Julii Caesares
- Juliae Caesares (sisters of Julius Caesar)
- Julia Flavia - daughter of Titus
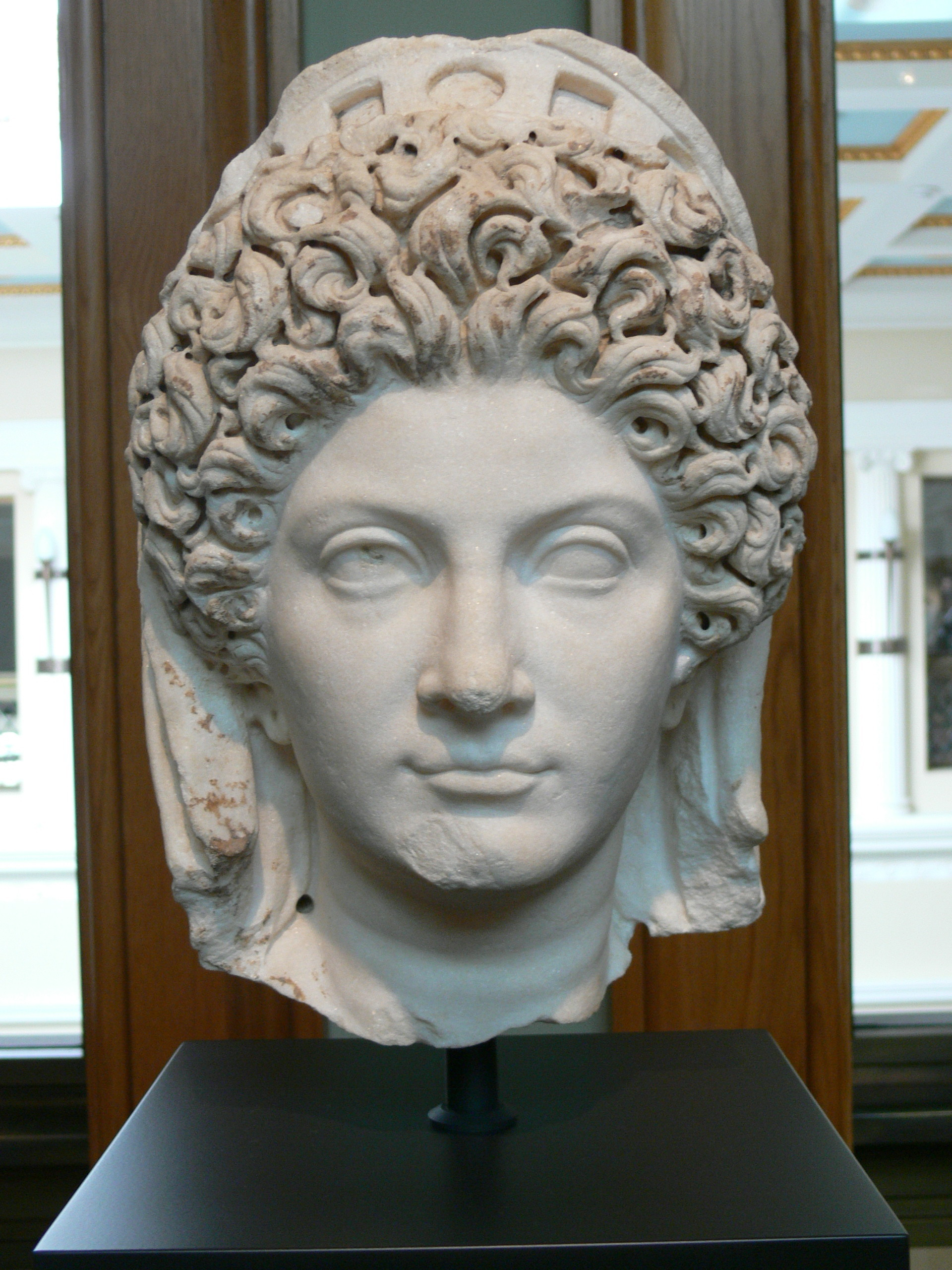
- Bust of Julia Flavia
  Vipsania Julia - granddaughter of Augustus
- Julia (mother of Mark Antony)
- Julia the Elder, daughter of Augustus
- Julia Domna - wife of Septimius Severus
- Julia Maesa - sister of Julia Domna
- Julia Soaemias Bassiana - daughter of Julia Maesa
- Julia Avita Mamaea - younger daughter of Julia Maesa
- Flavius Claudius Julianus (Julian) - emperor
- Julianus Salvius - jurist
- Gaius Julius Bassus - Governor of Bithynia-Pontus
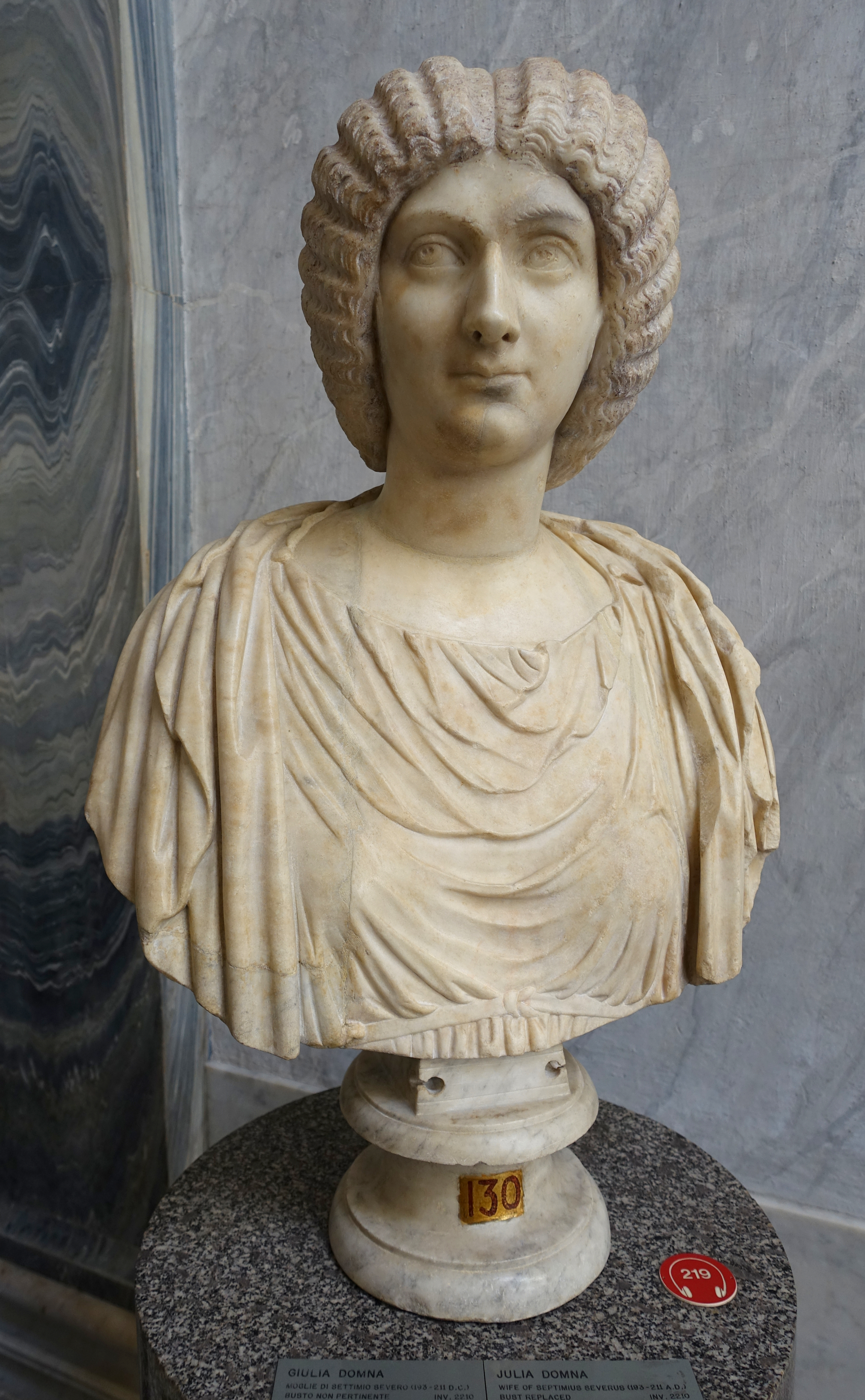
- Bust of Julia Domna
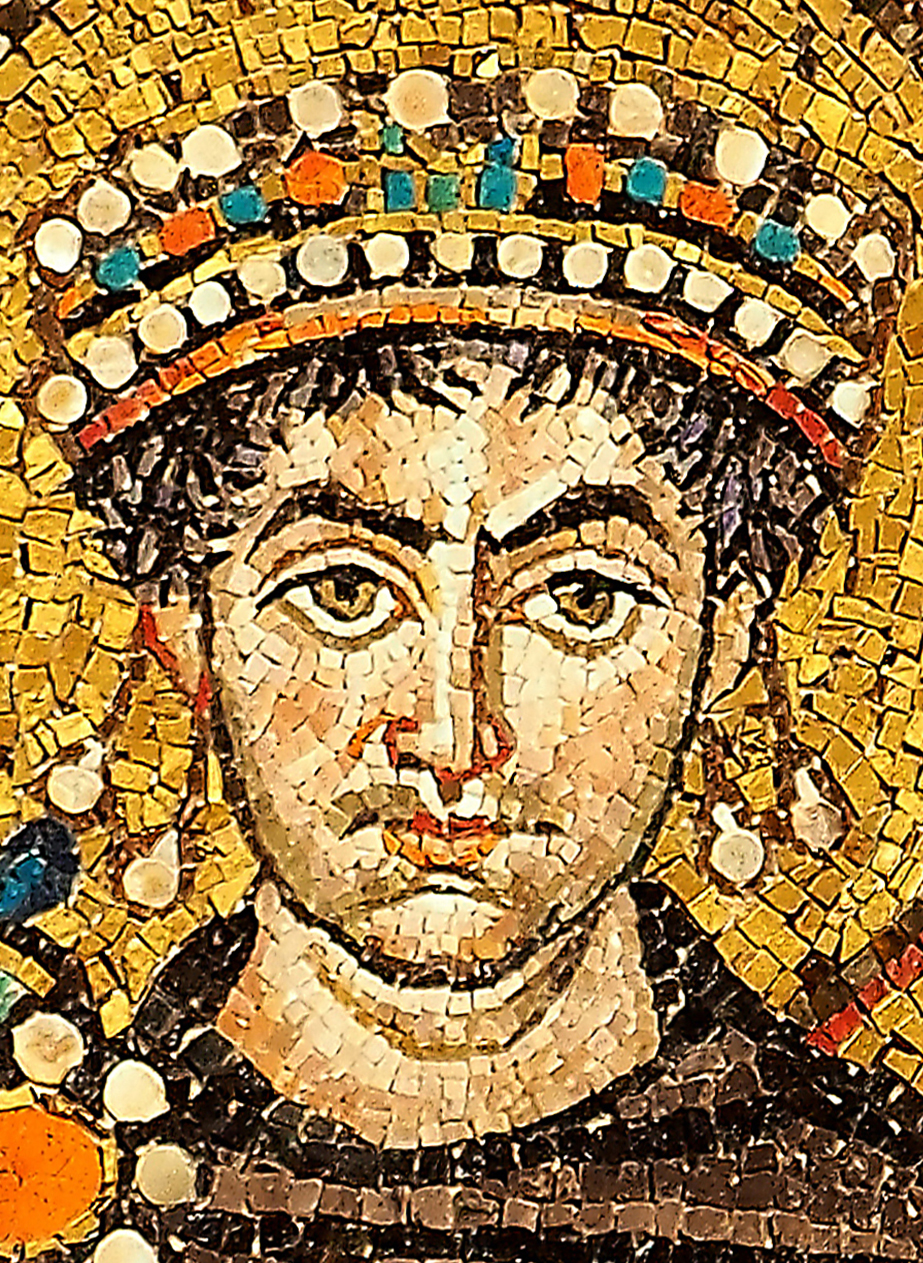
  Mosaic depicting Justinianus I
  Julius Caesar - general and dictator
- Lucius Julius Libo - consul and ancestor to Julius Caesar
- Julius Canus - philosopher
- Julius Cerealis - poet
- Sextus Julius Gabinianus - rhetor
- Julius Modestus - freedman of Hyginus
- Julius Romanus - grammarian
- Julius Tiro - rhetor
- Julius Valerius Alexander Polemius - writer
- Gaius Julius Victor - writer
- Marcus Junius Gracchanus - writer, possibly tribune
- Marcus Junius Nipsus - grammarian
- Junius Otho - praetor
- Justin Martyr - writer and martyr
- Justinian I - emperor
- Marcus Justinianus Justinus (Justin) - writer
- Decimus Iunius Iuvenalis (Juvenal) - poet
- Gaius Vettius Aquilinus Juvencus - Christian poet
- Marcus Juventius Laterensis - praetor

== L ==
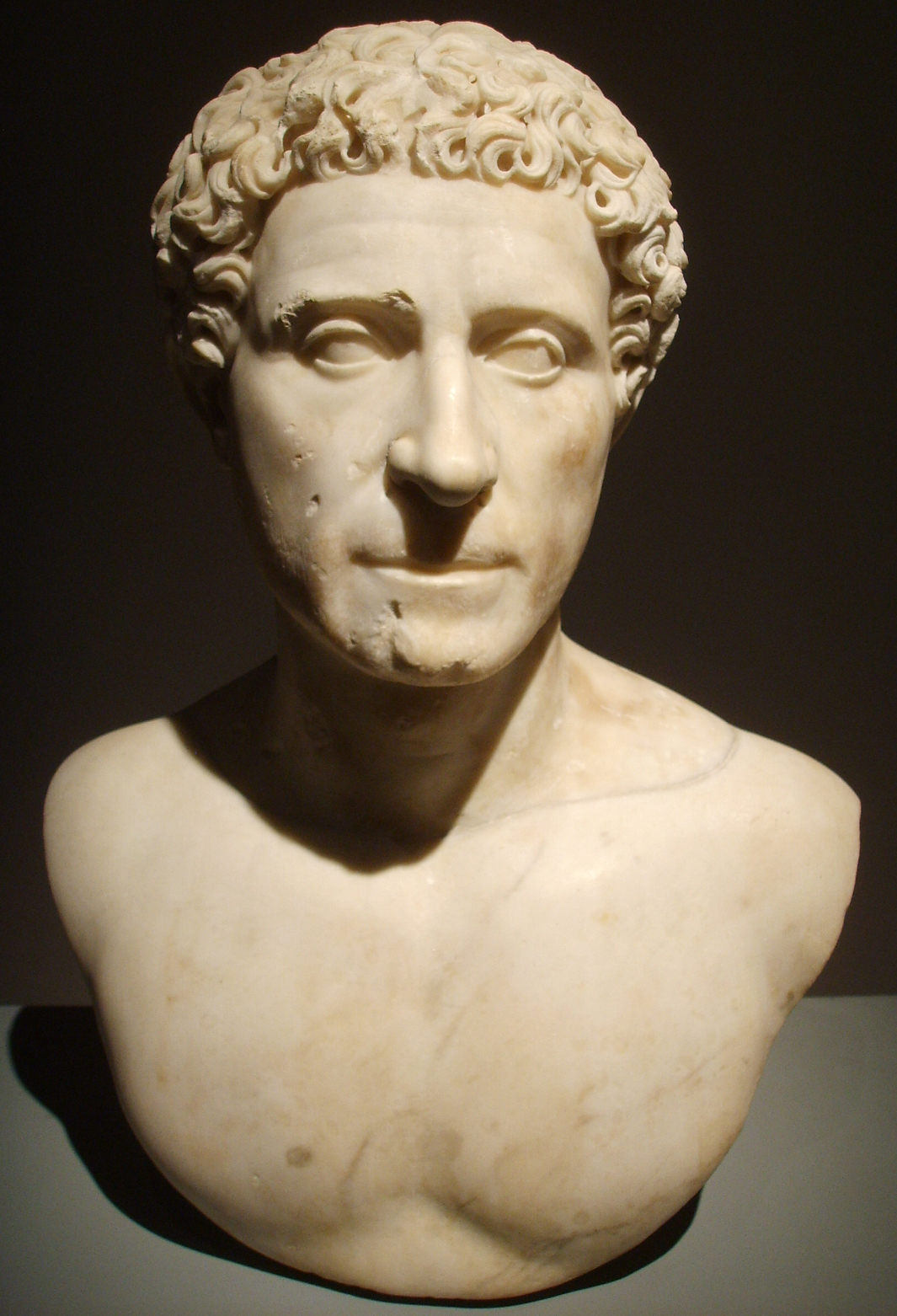
- Bust of Quitnus Labienus
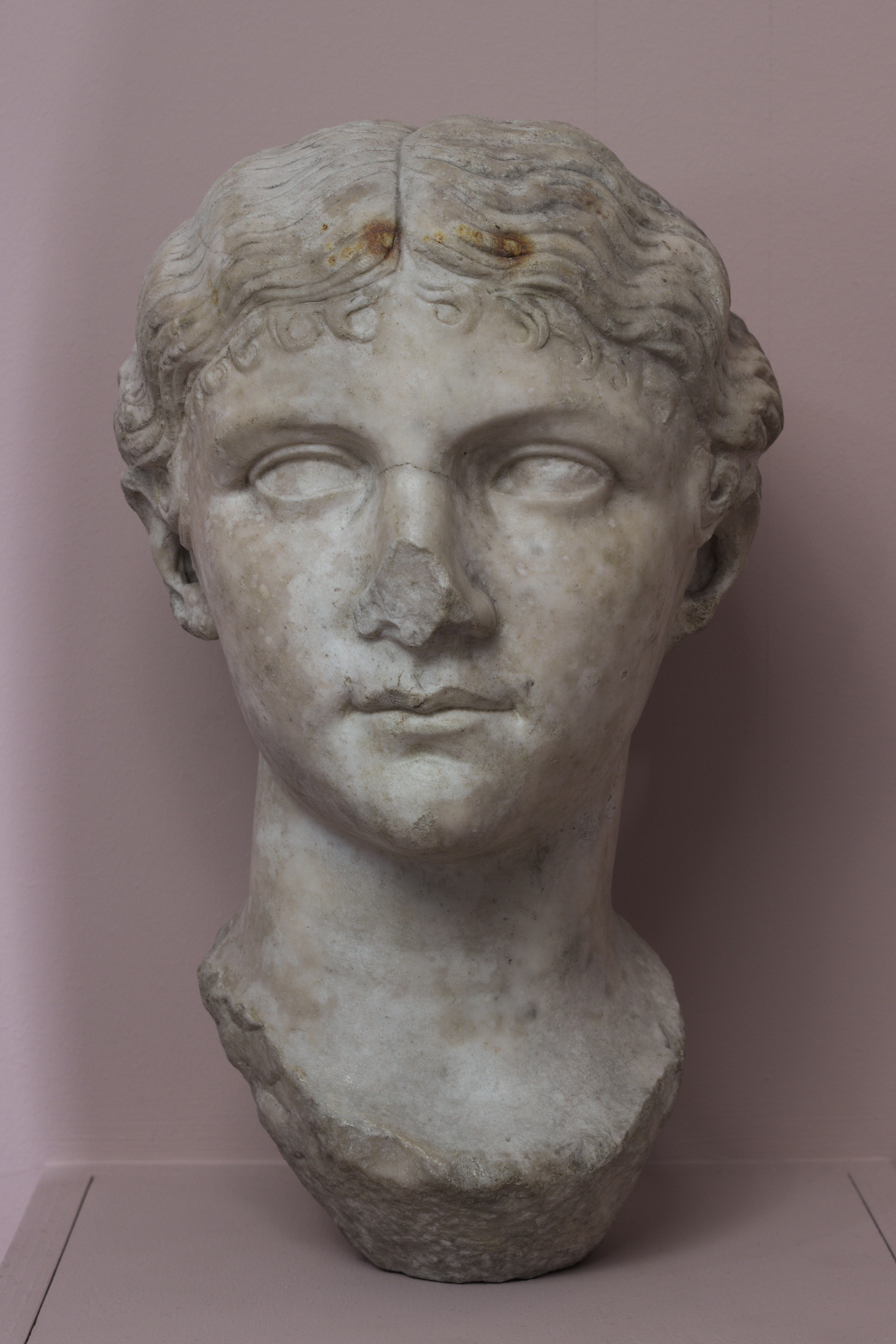
  Bust of Livilla
  Attius Labeo - translator
- Cornelius Antistius Labeo - historian
- Marcus Antistius Labeo - jurist
- Quintus Labienus - general
- Titus Labienus - two; legate for Caesar, orator
- Lactantius - writer
- Lucius Furius - tribune
- Gaius Laelius - consul
- Gaius Laelius Major - consul
- Laelius Archelaus - friend of Lucilius
- Marcus Valerius Laevinus - consul
- Laevius - writer
- Gaius Octavius Lampadio - scholar
- Larcius Licinus - writer
- Latinus - early hero
- Marcus Tullius Laurea - freedman of Cicero
- Pompeius Lenaeus - freedman teacher
- Gnaeus Cornelius Lentulus - two consuls
- Lucius Cornelius Lentulus - consul
- Lucius Cornelius Lentulus Crus - consul
- Gnaeus Cornelius Lentulus Gaetulicus - two consuls
- Gnaeus Cornelius Lentulus Marcellinus - consul
- Publius Cornelius Lentulus Spinther - consul
- Publius Cornelius Lentulus Sura - consul
- Manius Aemilius Lepidus - two consuls
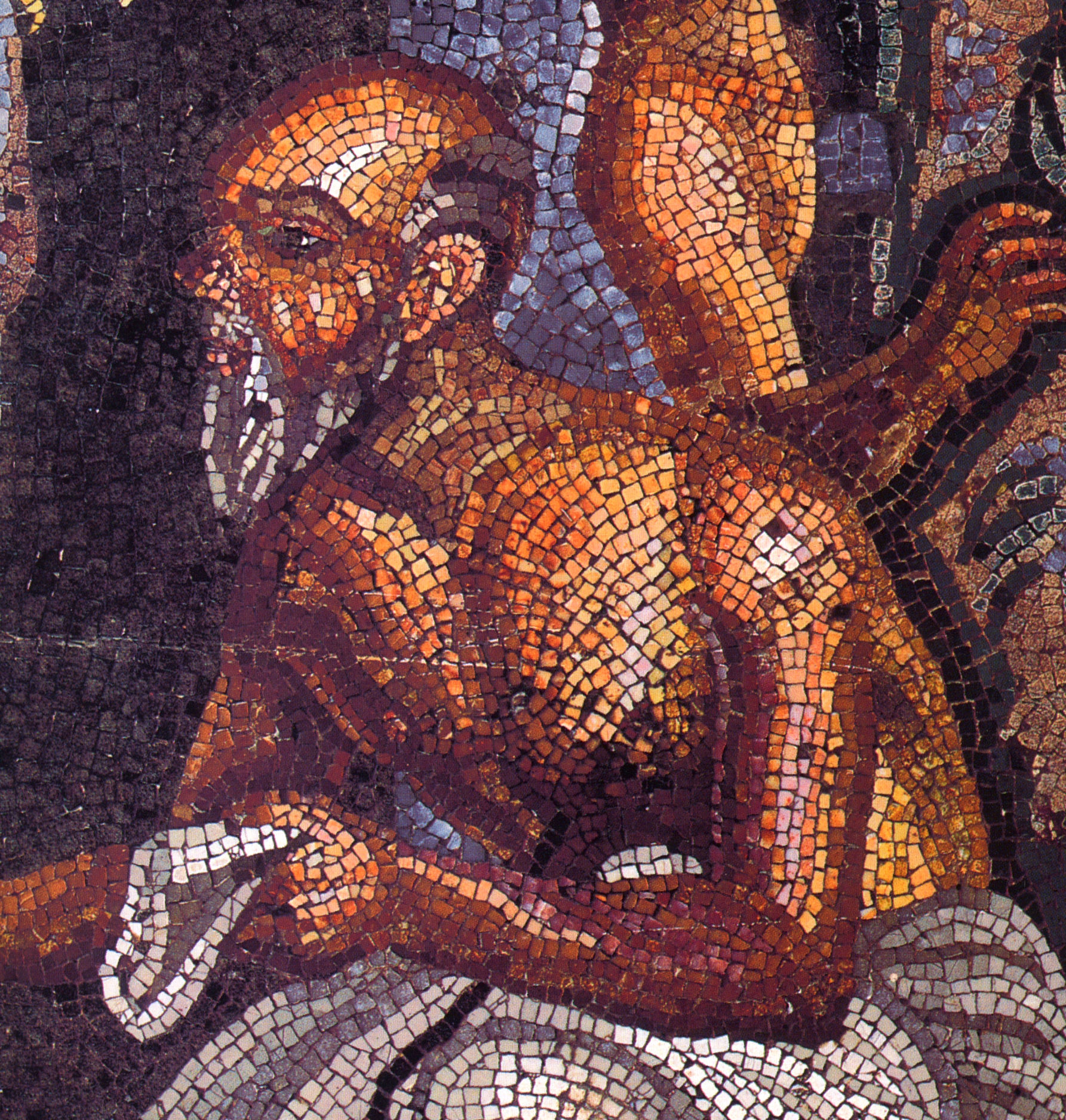
- Roman mosaic depicting Lucius Livius Andronicus
  Marcus Aemilius Lepidus - five
- Libanius - historian
- Licentius - friend of Augustine
- Valerius Licinianus Licinius - emperor
- Licinius Imbrex - poet
- Quintus Ligarius - general
- Livia Drusilla - wife of Augustus Caesar
- Livilla - daughter of Drusus
- Marcus Livius Drusus - reformer
- Lucius Livius Andronicus - dramatist
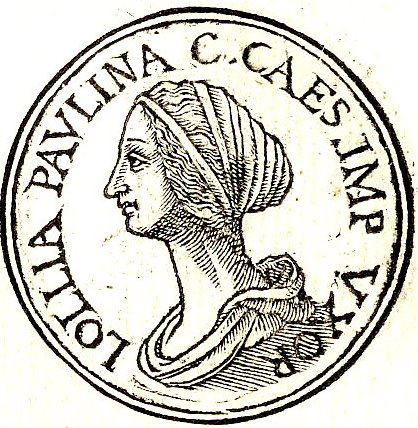
- Depiction of Lollia Paulina
  Titus Livius (Livy) - writer
- Lollia Paulina - wife of Caligula
- Marcus Lollius - rich legate
- Lollius Bassus - epigrammatist
- Marcus Lollius Palicanus - praetor
- Quintus Lollius Urbicus - governor
- Marcus Annaeus Lucanus (Lucan) - writer
- Lucius Lucceius - praetor
- Gaius Lucilius - writer
- Gaius Lucilius Iunior - writer
- Lucilla - daughter of Marcus Aurelius
- Lucretia - early heroine
- Lucretius - philosopher
- Spurius Lucretius Tricipitinus - early hero
- Lucius Licinius Lucullus - six; one aedile, two consuls, two praetors, and son of the conqueror-consul
- Marcus Terentius Varro Lucullus - consul
- Luscius Lanuvinus - poet
- Marcus Lurius - admiral
- Quintus Lusius Quietus - suffect consul
- Luxorius - writer and poet
- Lygdamus - poet

== M ==
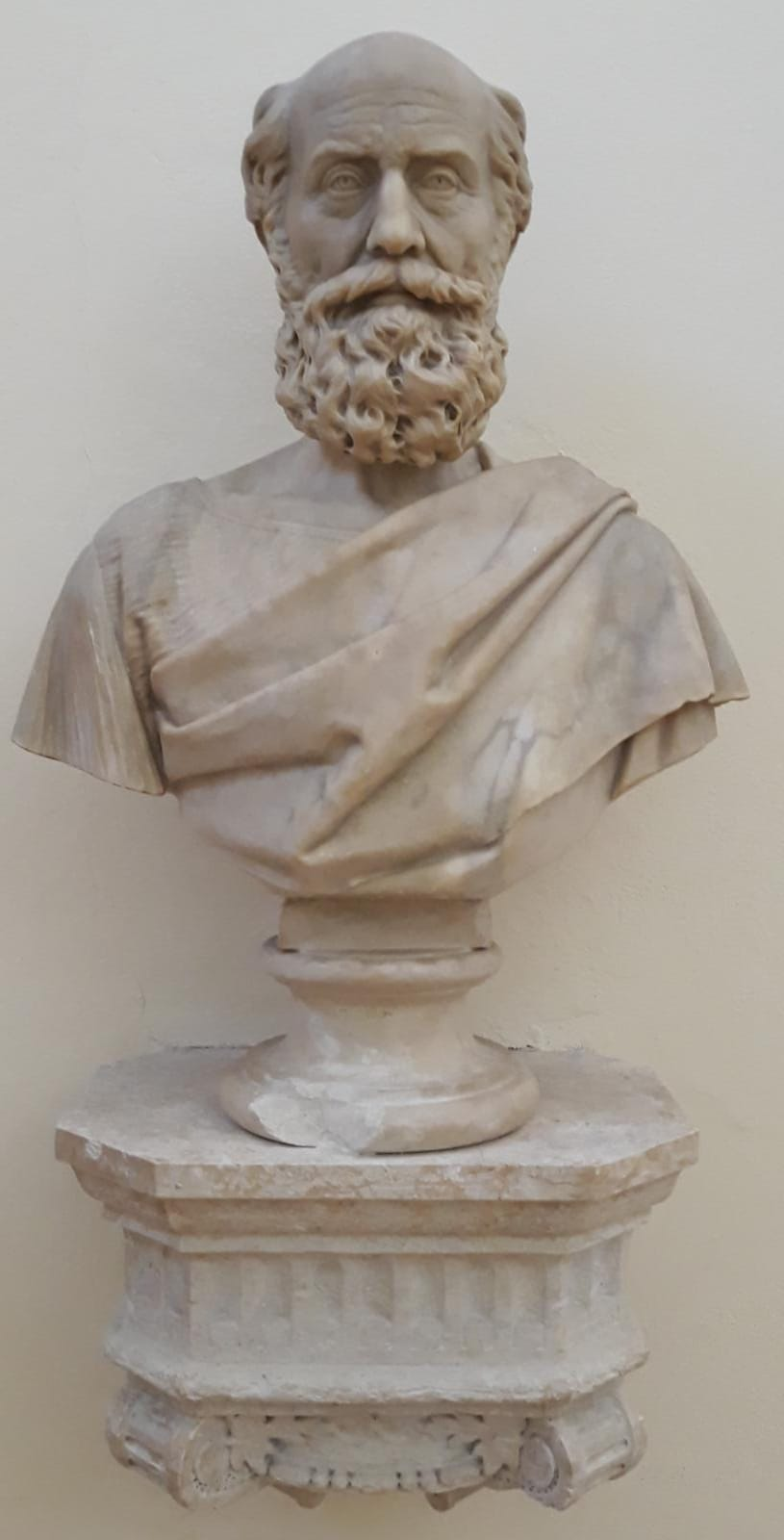
- Bust of Aemilius Macer
  Gaius Licinius Macer - annalist and praetor
- Gaius Licinius Macer Calvus - orator and poet
- Aemilius Macer - poet
- Titus Fulvius Junius Macrianus - emperor
- Marcus Opellius Macrinus - emperor
- Quintus Naevius Cordus Sutorius Macro - praetorian prefect
- Macrobius Ambrosius Theodosius - writer
- Gaius Maecenas - friend of Augustus
- Lucius Volusius Maecianus - jurist
- Spurius Maelius - early hero
- Gaius Maenius - consul
- Maevius - poet
- Flavius Magnus Magnentius - emperor
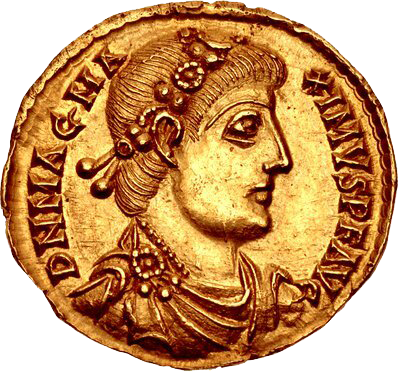
- Coin depicting Magnus Maximus
  Magnus Maximus - emperor
- Julius Majorian - emperor
- Mallius Theodorus - writer
- Octavius Mamilius Tusculanus - early hero
- Lucius Mamilius - dictator in Tusculum, aided Romans
- Gaius Mamilius Limetanus - tribune
- Mamurra - associate of Caesar
- Gaius Hostilius Mancinus - consul
- Gaius Manilius - tribune
- Manius Manilius - consul, jurist
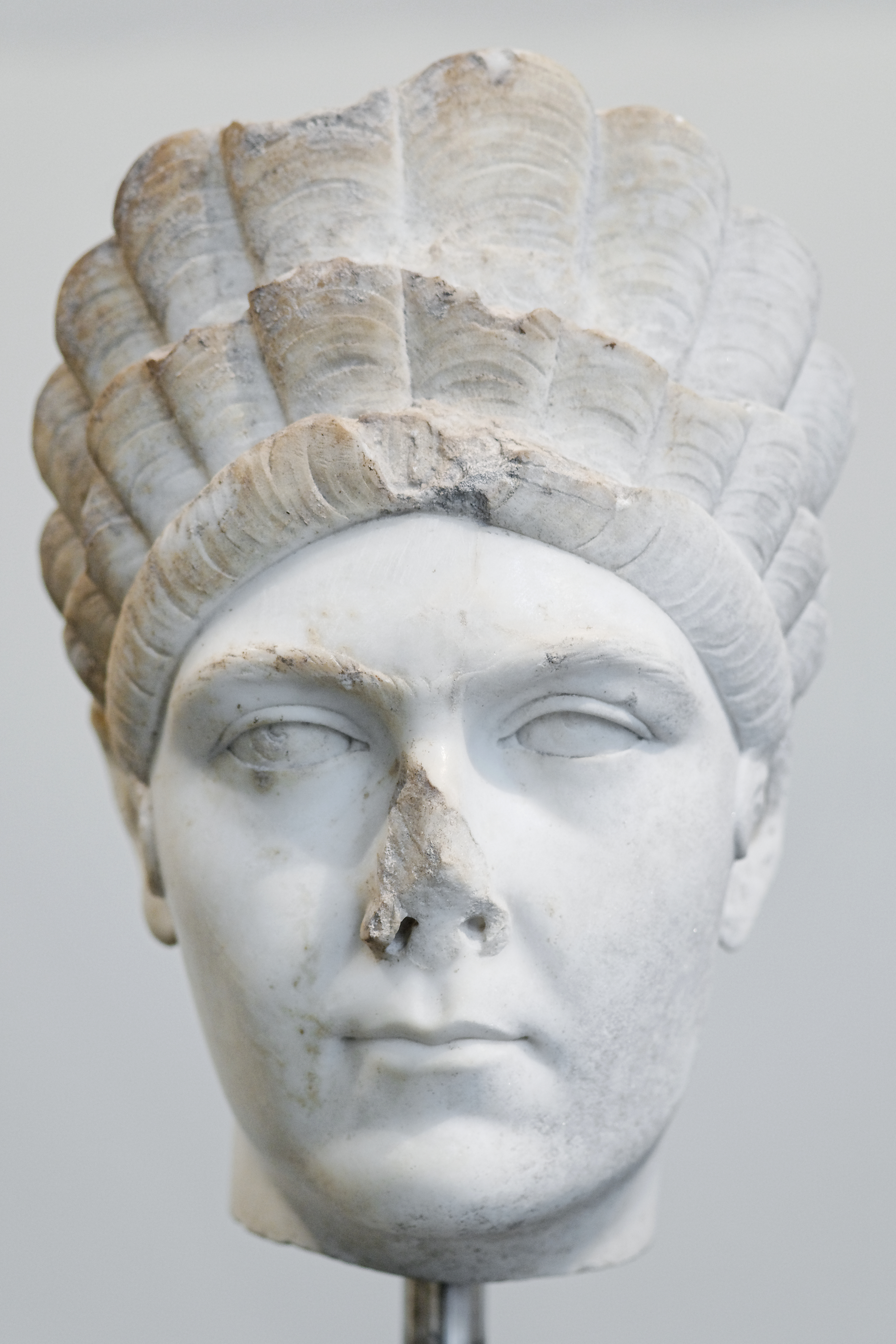
- Bust of Ulpia Marciana
  Marcus Manilius - writer
- Marcus Manlius Capitolinus - saved the Capitol from the Gauls in 390 BC
- Gaius Claudius Marcellus Maior, consul in 49 BC
- Gaius Claudius Marcellus Minor, consul in 50 BC
- Marcus Claudius Marcellus - five
- Marcus Pomponius Marcellus - grammarian
- Ulpius Marcellus - Jurist, lawyer, and possibly an advisor to the emperors Antoninus Pius and Marcus Aurelius
- Ulpius Marcellus - Consul and governor of Britannia
- Ulpius Marcellus - Possibly fictitious, potentially the son of the Ulpius Marcellus who was a governor of Britannia
- Marcia - freedwoman
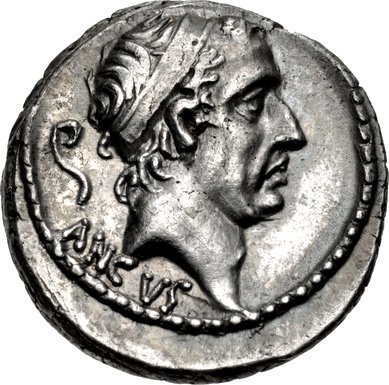
- Coin depicting Ancus Marcius
  Ulpia Marciana - sister of Trajan
- Aelius Marcianus - jurist
- Marcius - writer
- Ancus Marcius - early king
- Gaius Marcius Rutilus - consul
- Marcus Aemilius Scaurus - princeps senatus, leader of the conservative faction
- Gaius Marius - general, consul seven times
- Marcus Marius Gratidianus - praetor
- Sextus Marius - mine owner
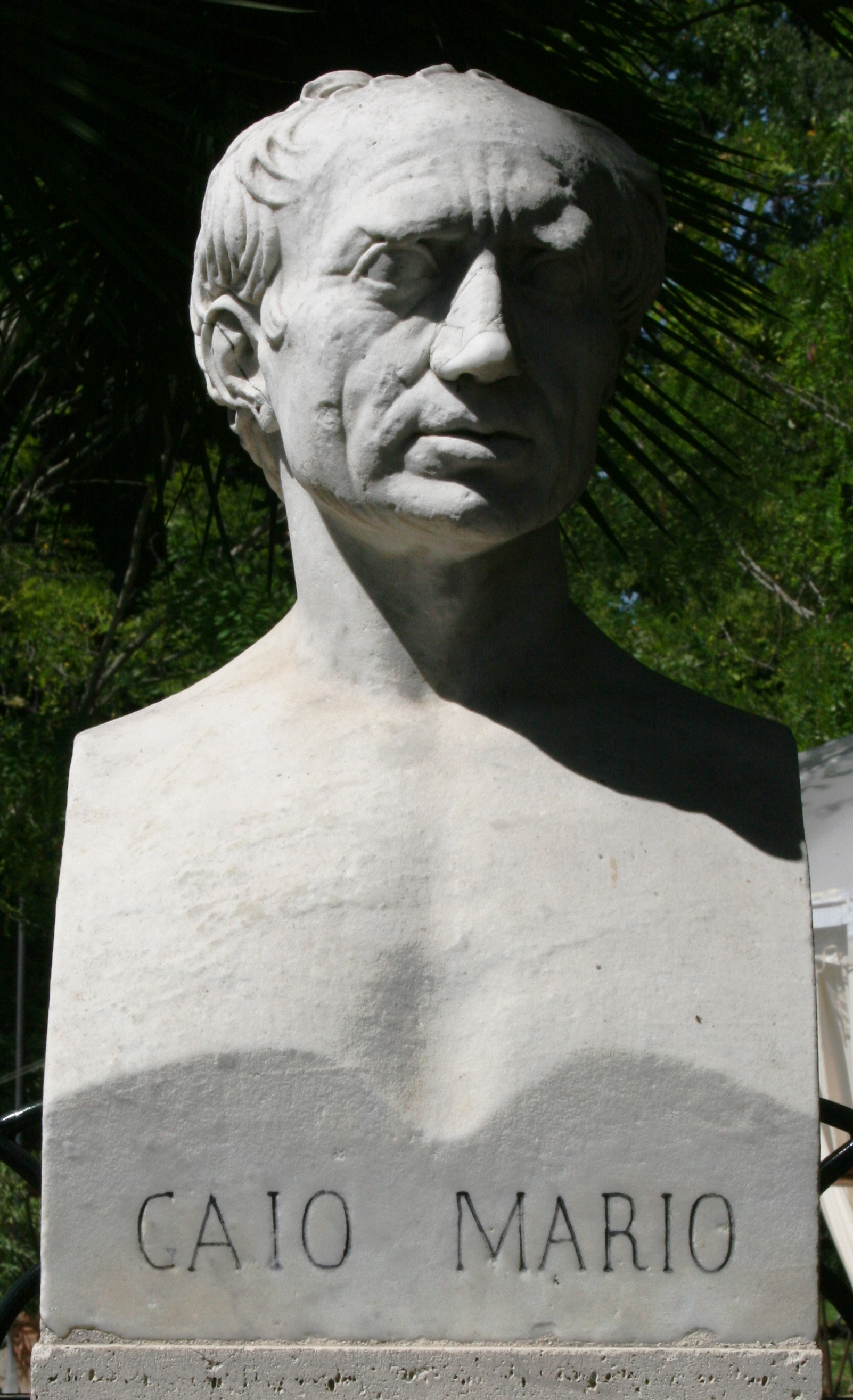
- Bust of Gaius Marius
  Marius Priscus - Governor of the province of Africa
- Marius Maximus - writer
- Julius Firmicus Maternus - astrologer
- Marcus Valerius Martialis (Martial) - writer
- Marullus - rhetor
- Salonia Matidia - niece of Trajan
- Gaius Matius - friend of Cicero
- Gnaeus Matius - writer
- Mavortius - writer
- Marcus Aurelius Valerius Maxentius - emperor
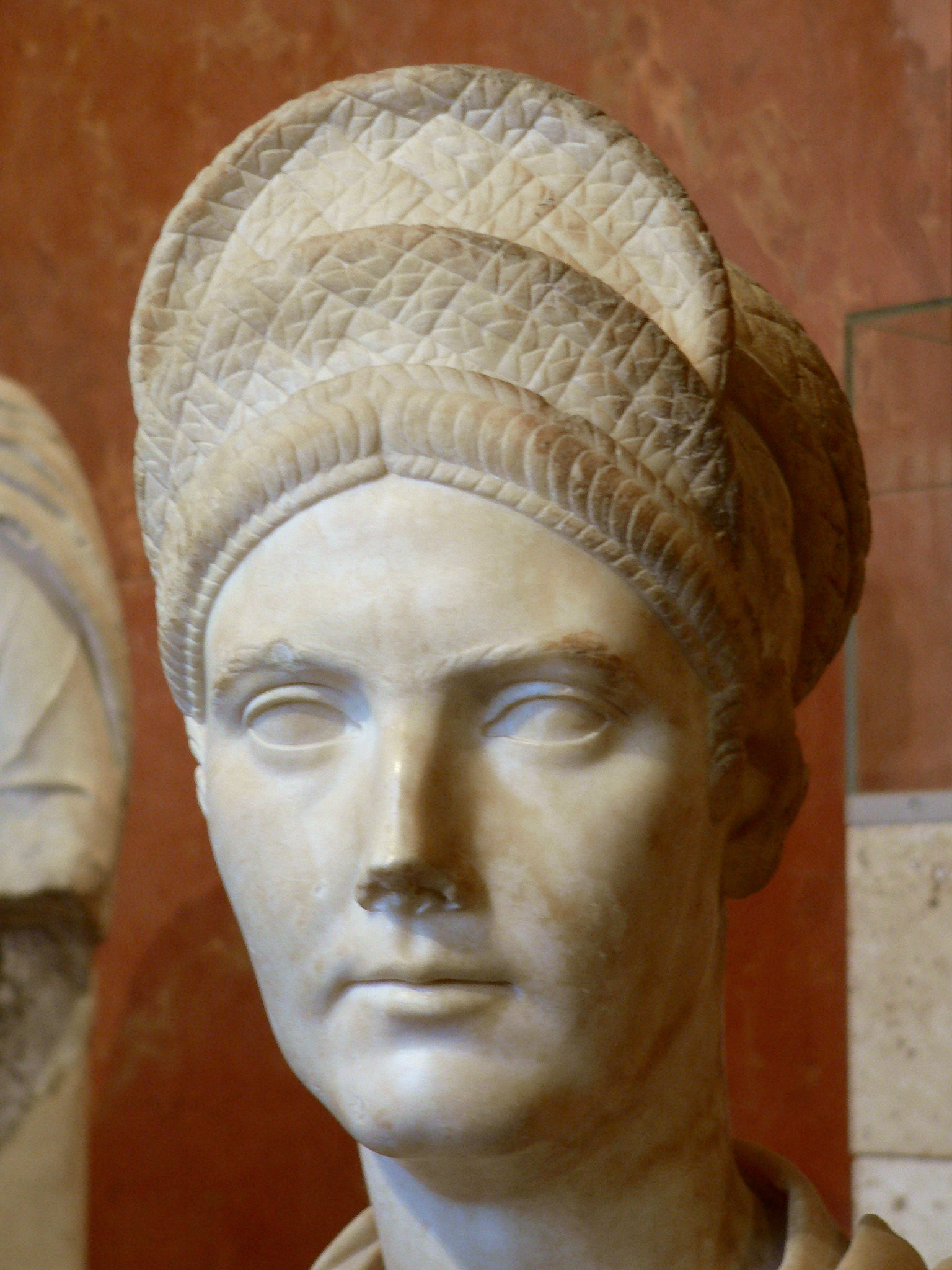
- Bust of Salonia Matidia
  Marcus Aurelius Valerius Maximianus (Maximian) - emperor
- Gaius Julius Verus Maximinus - emperor
- Gaius Galerius Valerius Maximianus - emperor
- Sextus Quinctilius Valerius Maximus - friend of Pliny
- Pomponius Mela - geographer
- Lucius Annaeus Mela - son of Seneca
- Aelius Melissus - writer
- Gaius Melissus - freedman of Maecenas
- Gaius Memmius - two praetors
- Agrippa Menenius Lanatus - early consul
- Flavius Merobaudes - soldier, poet
- Lucius Cornelius Merula - two consuls
- Manius Valerius Maximus Corvinus Messalla - consul
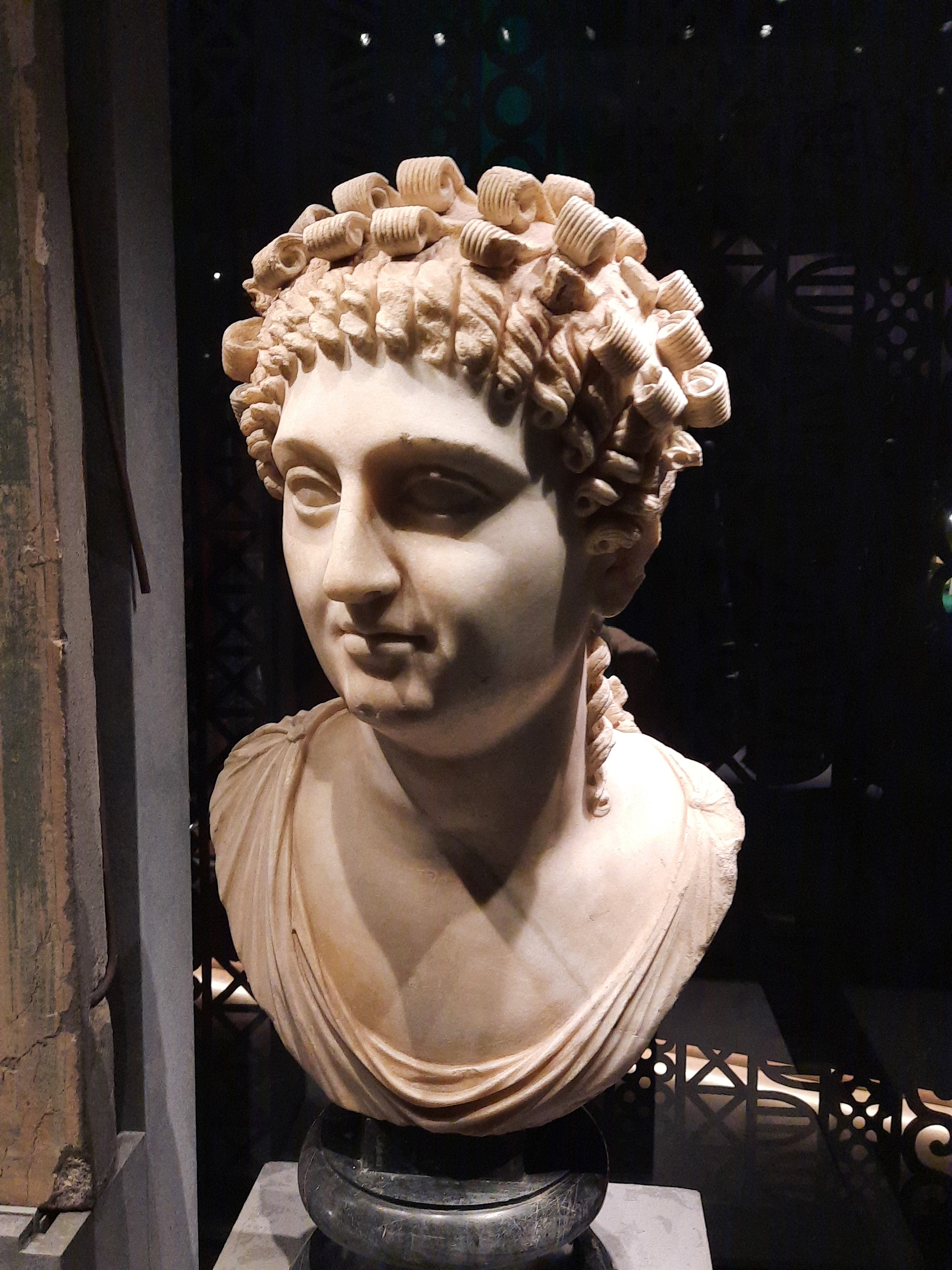
- Bust of Statilia Messalina
  Marcus Valerius Messalla two cousins, one a consul
- Marcus Valerius Messalla Corvinus - consul
- Marcus Valerius Messalla Messallinus - consul
- Vipstanus Messala - tribune
- Statilia Messalina - third wife of Nero
- Valeria Messalina - Claudius' wife
- Caecilia Metella Dalmatica married Marcus Aemilius Scaurus and Sulla
- Caecilia Metella - three
- Lucius Caecilius Metellus - consul
- Quintus Caecilius Metellus - consul
- Quintus Caecilius Metellus Balearicus - consul
- Quintus Caecilius Metellus Celer - consul
- Quintus Caecilius Metellus Creticus - consul
- Quintus Caecilius Metellus Delmaticus - consul
- Quintus Caecilius Metellus Macedonicus - consul
- Quintus Caecilius Metellus Numidicus - consul
- Quintus Caecilius Metellus Pius - consul
- Quintus Caecilius Metellus Pius Scipio - consul
- Mettius Pomposianus - consul
- Titus Annius Milo - praetor
- Lucius Minucius Esquilinus Augurinus - early consul
- Marcus Minucius Felix - writer
- Marcus Minucius Rufus - two consuls
- Gaius Minucius Augurinus - tribune
- Mucia Tertia - wife of Pompey and Gaius Marius the younger
- Gaius Licinius Mucianus - consul
- Lucius Mummius Achaicus - consul
- Lucius Statius Murcus - proconsul
- Lucius Licinius Murena - consul
- Musaeus Grammaticus - poet
- Gaius Musonius Rufus - philosopher

== N ==
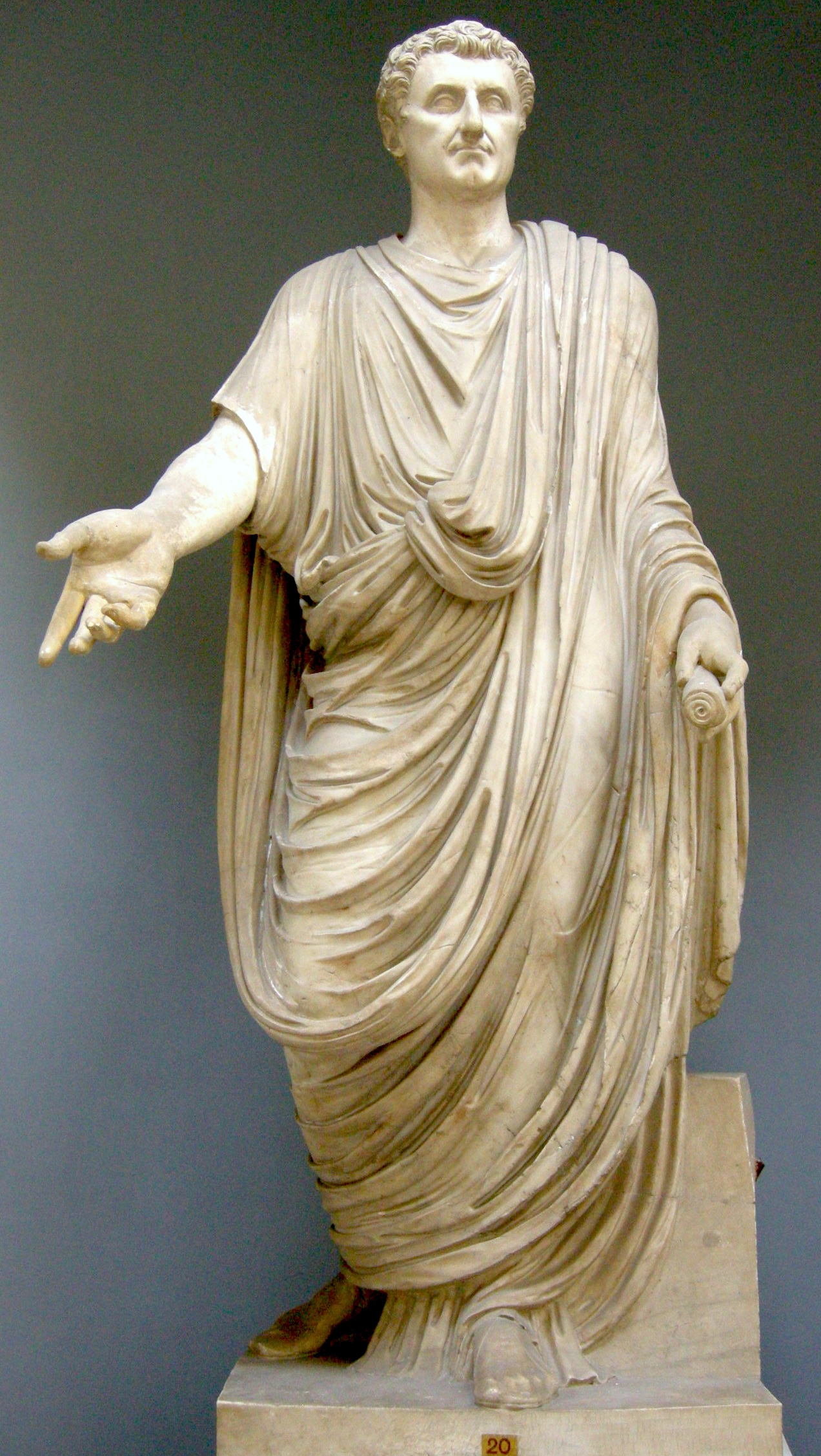
- Statue of Nerva
  Narses - General
- Gnaeus Naevius - poet
- Rutilius Claudius Namatianus - poet
- Narcissus - freedman of Claudius
- Marcus Aurelius Olympius Nemesianus - poet
- Cornelius Nepos - writer
- Lucius Neratius Priscus - jurist
- Nero Claudius Caesar Augustus Germanicus (Nero) - emperor
- Gaius Claudius Nero - consul
- Tiberius Claudius Nero - praetor
- Nero Julius Caesar - son of Germanicus
- Lucius Cocceius Nerva - diplomat
- Marcus Cocceius Nerva - three; emperor and two consuls
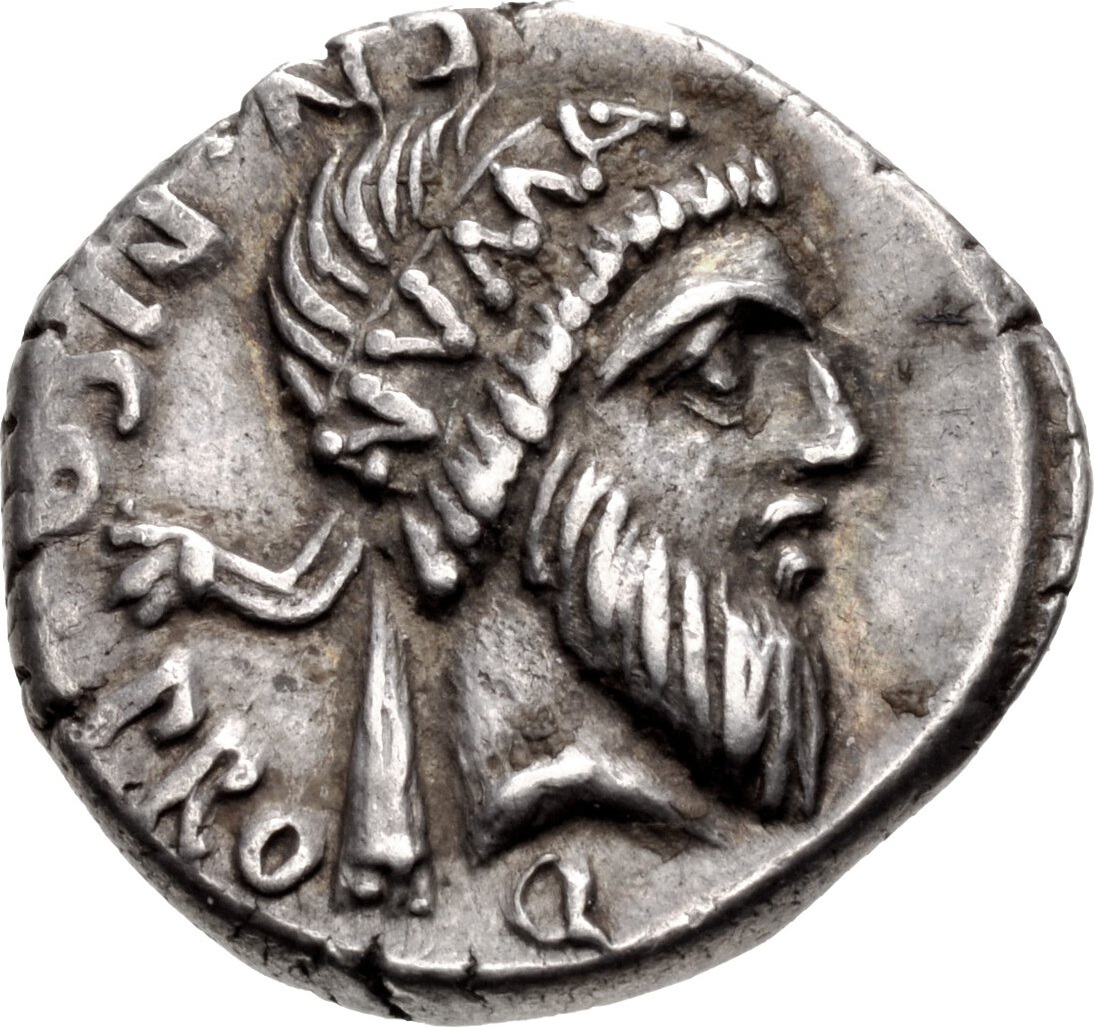
- Coin depicting Numa Pompilius
  Attus Navius - famous augur during the reign of Tarquinius Priscus
- Lucius Septimius Nestor - writer
- Virius Nicomachus Flavianus - late politician
- Publius Nigidius Figulus - praetor, scholar
- Ninnius Crassus - translator
- Marcus Fulvius Nobilior - consul
- Nonius Marcellus - lexicographer, grammarian
- Gaius Norbanus - consul
- Aulus Lappius Maximus Norbanus - suffect consul
- Quintus Novius - dramatist
- Numa Pompilius - king
- Marcus Aurelius Numerianus - emperor
- Gaius Nymphidius Sabinus - son of a freedwoman, military commander

== O ==
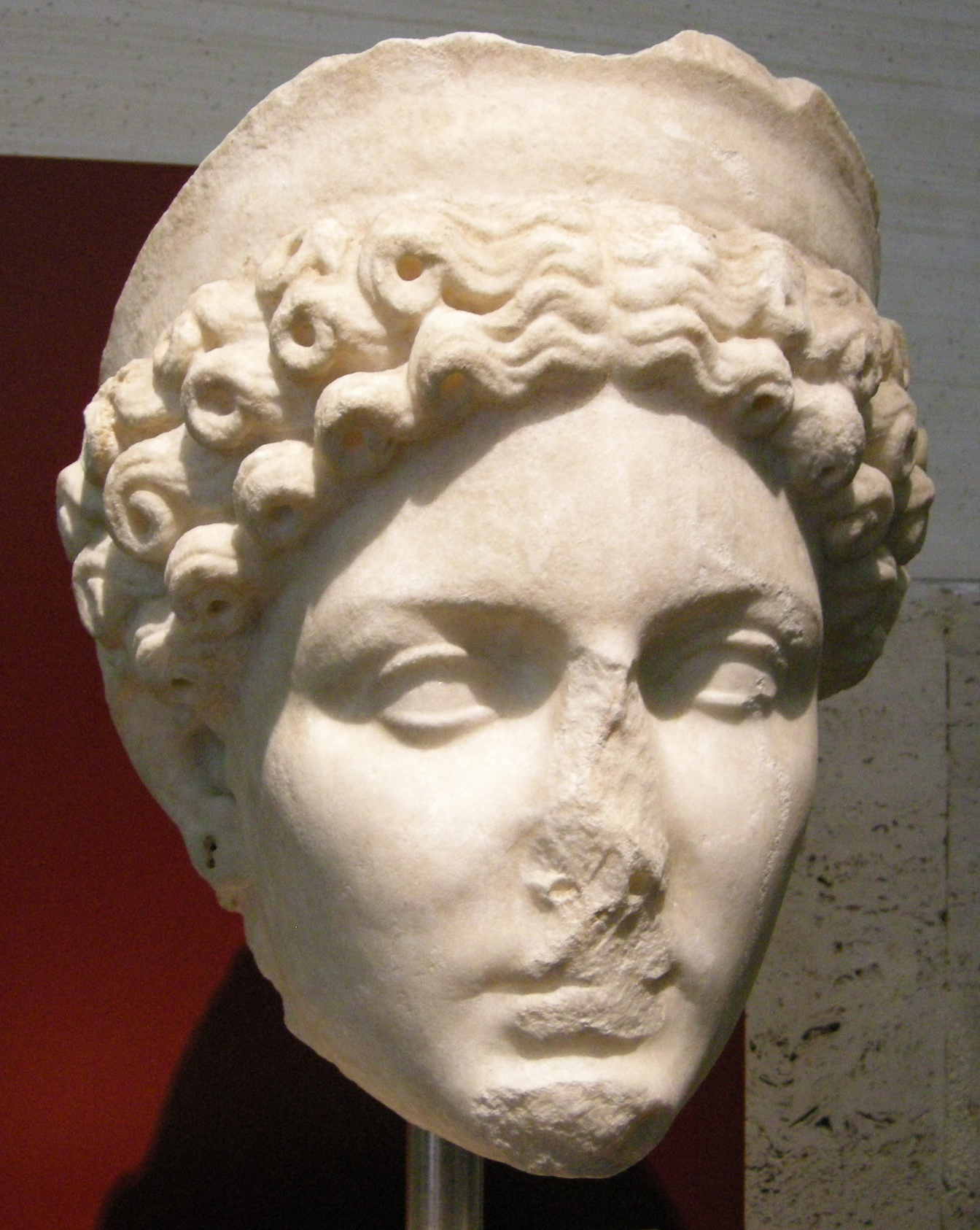
- Bust of Claudia Octavia
  Iulius Obsequens - writer
- Octavia - Major and Minor, two sisters of Augustus
- Claudia Octavia - daughter of Claudius
- Gaius Octavius - praetor, father of Augustus
- Gnaeus Octavius - two consuls
- Marcus Octavius - tribune
- Septimius Odenathus - king in east
- Quintus Lucretius Ofella (Afella) - commander
- Quintus Ogulnius Gallus - tribune
- Olympiodorus of Thebes - writer, emissary
- Olympiodorus the Younger - philosopher, astrologer
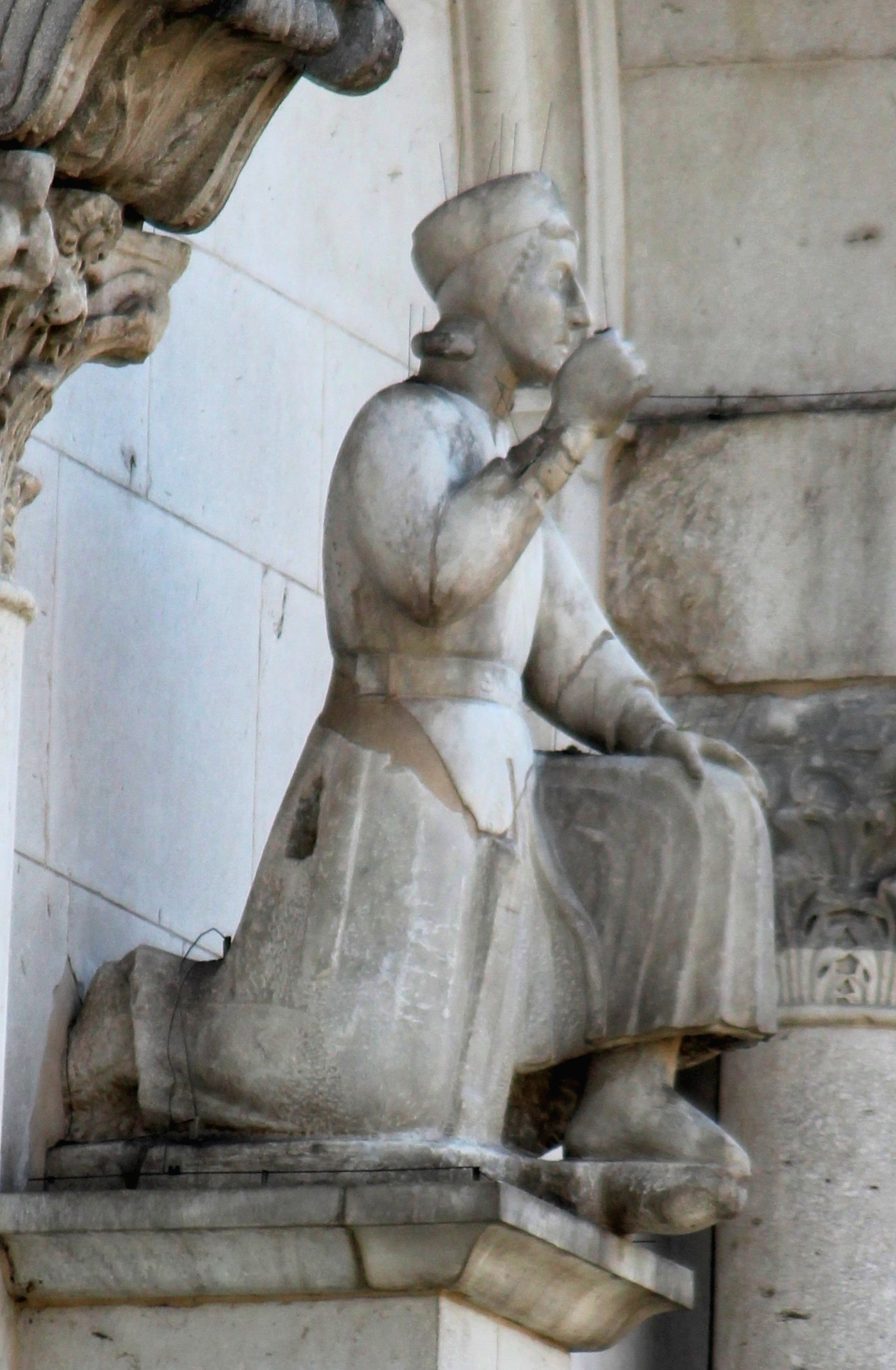
  Statue of Lucius Orbilius Pupilius
- Aurelius Opilius - freedman writer
- Lucius Opimius - consul
- Gaius Oppius - two
- Publilius Optatianus Porfyrius - poet
- Lucius Orbilius Pupillus - teacher, grammarian
- Paulus Orosius - late writer
- Publius Ostorius Scapula - Governor of Britain
- Titus Otacilius Crassus - praetor
- Marcus Salvius Otho - emperor
- Publius Ovidius Naso (Ovid) - poet
- Ovinius - tribune

== P ==
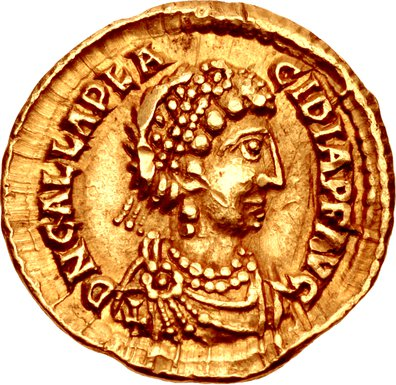
- Coin depicting Galla Placidia
  Marcus Pacuvius - dramatist
- Lucius Caesennius Paetus - consul
- Quintus Remmius Palaemon - ex-slave writer
- Palfurius Sura - orator
- Rutilius Taurus Aemilianus Palladius - farmer
- Aulus Cornelius Palma Frontonianus - consul
- Gaius Vibius Pansa Caetronianus - consul
- Aemilius Papinianus (Papinian) - jurist
- Papirianus - grammarian
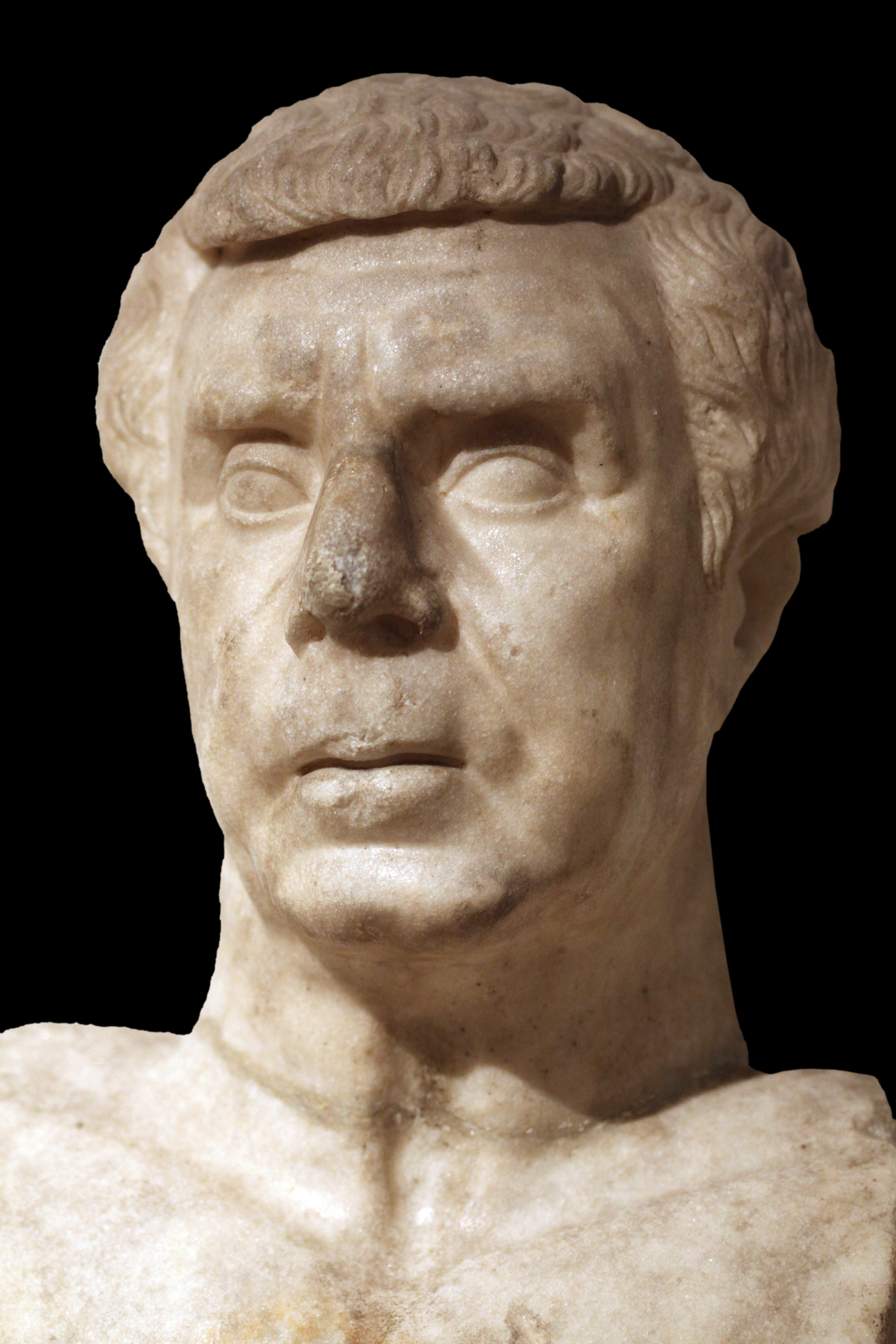
  Bust depicting Lucius Munatius Plancus
- Lucius Papirius Cursor - two; heroic consul and son
- Gaius Papius Mutilus - Samnite leader
- Passienus - orator
- Aemilius Lepidus Paullus - consul
- Lucius Aemilius Paullus (disambiguation) - several men, including three consuls
- Lucius Aemilius Paullus Macedonicus - consul
- Julius Paulus - jurist
- Paulus Alexandrinus - astrologer
- Quintus Pedius - consul
- Sextus Pedius - jurist
- Marcus Perperna - two consuls
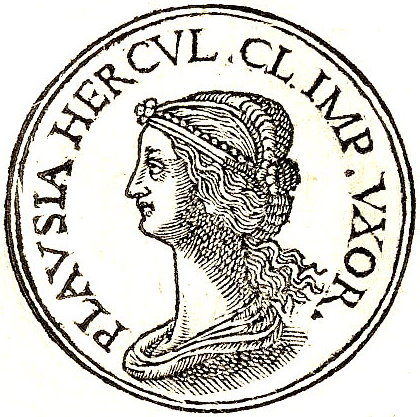
- Depiction of Plautia Urgulanilla
  Marcus Perperna Veiento - praetor
- Aulus Persius Flaccus - satirist
- Publius Helvetius Pertinax - emperor
- Gaius Pescennius Niger Justus - emperor
- Quintus Petillius - two cousins
- Marcus Petreius - governor
- Petronius - courtier of Nero
- Publius Petronius - suffect consul
- Petronius Arbiter - writer
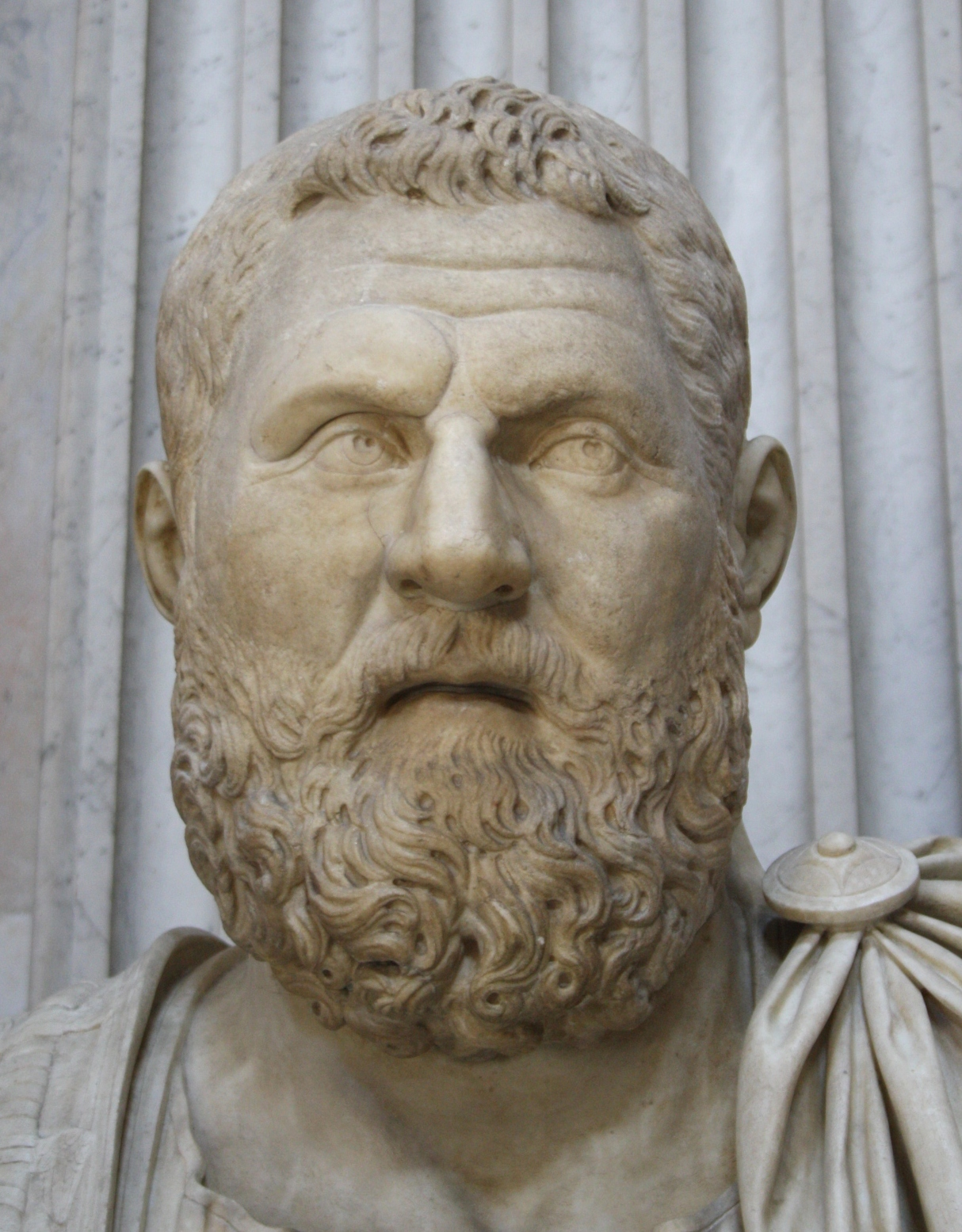
- Statue of Gaius Fulvius Plautianus
  Lucius Petronius Taurus Volusianus praetorian prefect, consul, city prefect
- Publius Petronius Turpilianus - consul
- Julius Verus Philippus (Philip the Arab) - emperor
- Lucius Marcius Philippus - three consuls
- Quintus Marcius Philippus - consul
- Calpurnius Piso - several
- Gaius Calpurnius Piso - several
- Gnaeus Calpurnius Piso - three; two consuls and a governor
- Lucius Calpurnius Piso - three consuls
- Lucius Calpurnius Piso Caesoninus - consul
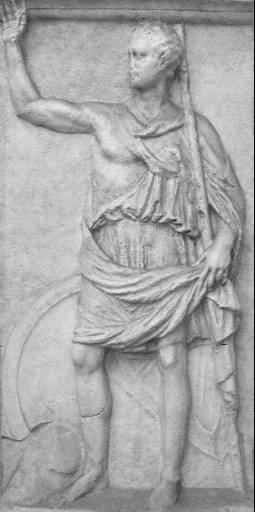
- Stele depicting Polybius
  Lucius Calpurnius Piso Licinianus - briefly emperor
- Lucius Calpurnius Piso Frugi - consul
- Marcus Pupius Piso Frugi - consul
- Galla Placidia - daughter of Theodosius I
- Placidus - grammarian
- Lactantius Placidus - different grammarian
- Munatia Plancina - friend of Livia
- Gnaeus Plancius - aedile
- Lucius Munatius Plancus - consul
- Titus Munatius Plancus Bursa - tribune
- Pompeius Planta - prefect
- Aulus Platorius Nepos - consul
- Plautia Urgulanilla - Claudius' first wife
- Gaius Fulvius Plautianus - consul
- Plautius - jurist
- Aulus Plautius - consul
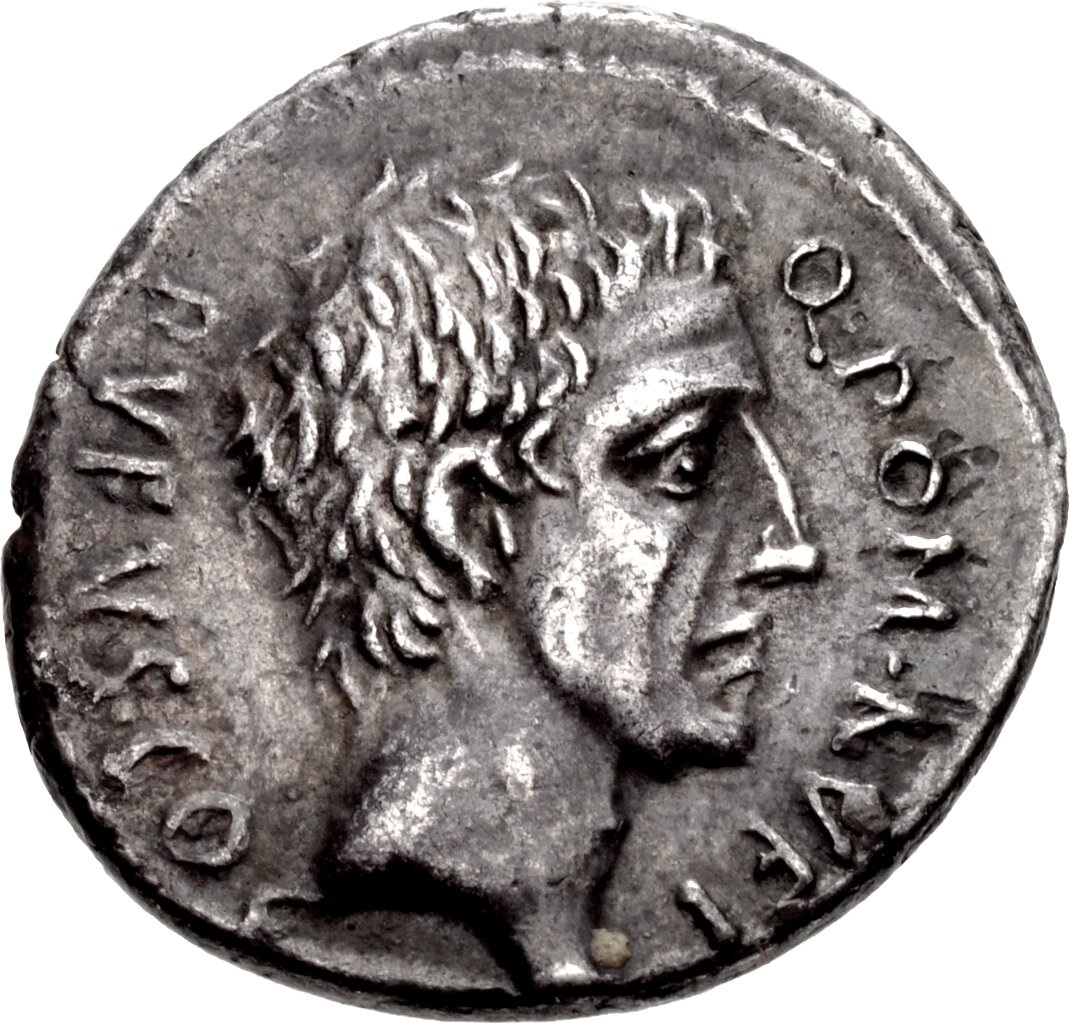
- Coin depicting Pompeius Rufus
  Publius Plautius Hypsaeus - praetor, quaestor, and aedile
- Plautius Lateranus - senator
- Marcus Plautius Silvanus - two; tribune and consul
- Tiberius Plautius Silvanus Aelianus - consul
- Titus Maccius Plautus - dramatist
- Plautus Saevius - convicted for corrupting his son during the reign of Tiberius
- Quintus Pleminius - legate
- Gaius Plinius Secundus (Pliny the Elder) - scholar
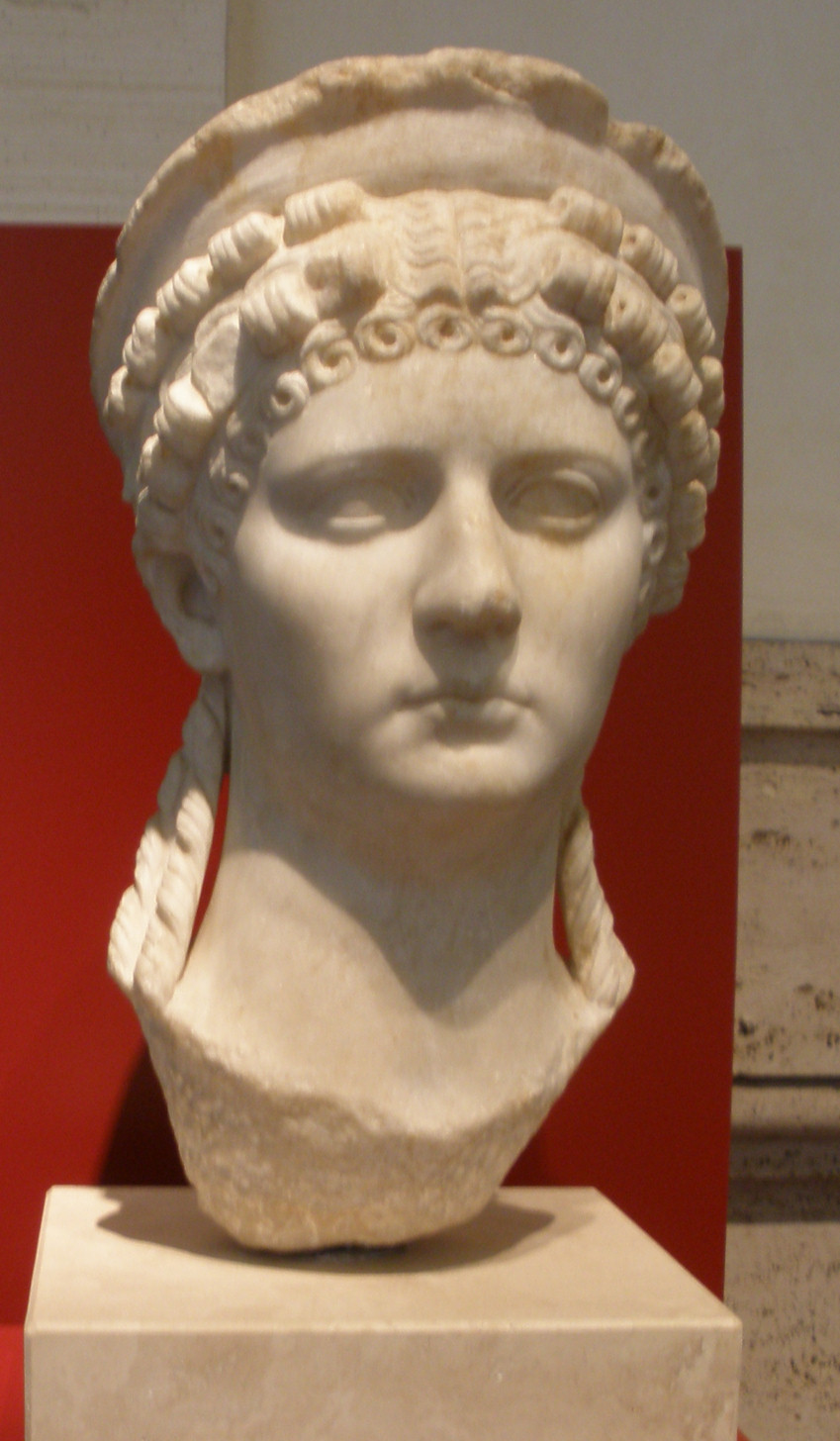
- Bust of Poppaea Sabina
  Gaius Plinius Caecilus Secundus (Pliny the Younger) - scholar
- Pompeia Plotina - wife of Trajan
- Plotinus - philosopher
- Plotius Tucca - friend of Virgil
- Mestrius Plutarchus (Plutarch) - philosopher, biographer
- Gaius Poetelius Libo Visolus - consul
- Gaius Asinius Pollio - consul, scholar
- Julius Pollux - scholar
- Polybius - two; historian and freedman
- Tiberius Claudius Pompeianus - consul of Marcus Aurelius
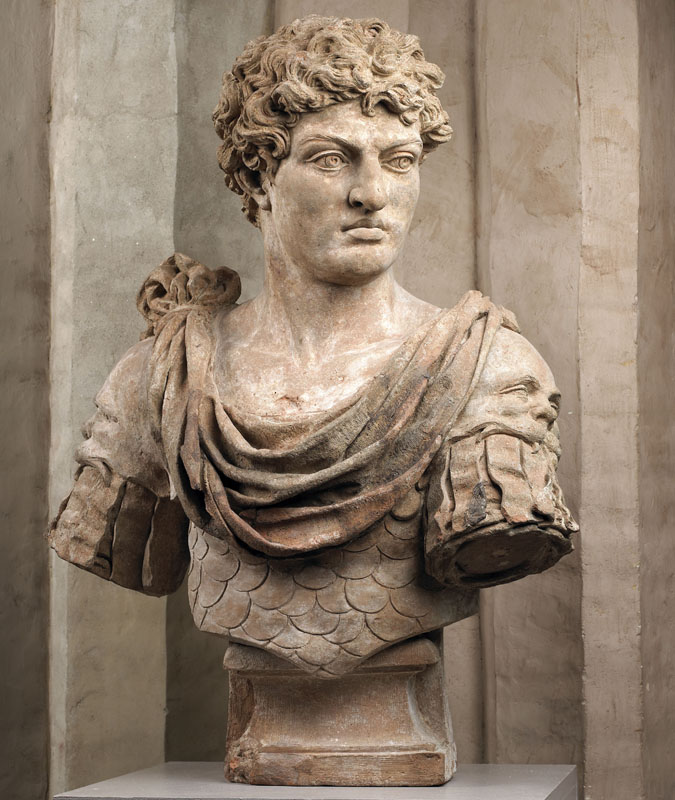
- Marcus Antonius Primus
  Pompeius Grammaticus - grammarian
- Gnaeus Pompeius - son of Pompey
- Quintus Pompeius - consul
- Gnaeus Pompeius Magnus (Pompey) - triumvir
- Sextus Pompeius Magnus Pius - son of Pompey
- Quintus Pompeius Rufus - consul
- Pompeius Saturninus - orator, historian, poet
- Pompeius Silo - rhetor
- Pompeius Strabo - consul
- Pompilius - second king
- Lucius Pomponius - poet
- Sextus Pomponius - jurist
- Marcus Pomponius Bassulus - writer
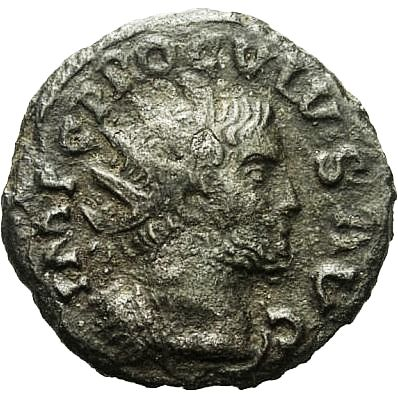
- Coin depicting Proculus
  Titus Pomponius Proculus Vitrasius Pollio - consul
- Pomponius Rufus - writer
- Pomponius Secundus - consul
- Gavius Pontius - Samnite general
- Pontius Telesinus - praetor
- Pontius Pilatus - prefect of Judaea
- Gaius Popillius Laenas - consul
- Publius Popillius Laenas - consul
- Poppaea Sabina - wife of Nero
- Quintus Poppaedius Silo - friend of Drusus
- Porcia - daughter of Cato
- Porcius Licinus - writer
- Marcus Porcius Latro - rhetor
- Pomponius Porphyrion - scholar
- Porsenna - semi-legendary king
- Aulus Postumius - several people
- Spurius Postumius Albinus - consul
- Lucius Postumius Megellus - consul
- Aulus Postumius Tubertus - dictator
- Marcus Cassianus Postumus - emperor
- Marcus Antonius Primus - general
- Priscianus - grammarian
- Priscus - politician, historian
- Marcus Aurelius Probus - emperor
- Valerius Probus - scholar
- Saint Procula - wife of Pontius Pilate
- Proculus - usurper
- Proculus (jurist) - jurist
- Sextus Propertius - writer
- Aurelius Clemens Prudentius - Christian poet
- Quintus Publilius Philo - consul
- Publilius Syrus - writer
- Volero Publilius - early tribune
- Publius Pupius - tragedian

== Q ==
- Gaius Iulius Quadratus Bassus - general and suffect consul in 105
- Asinius Quadratus - senator
- Titus Quinctius Capitolinus Barbatus - early consul
- Marcus Fabius Quintilianus (Quintilian) - rhetor
- Quintus - physician
- Quintus Smyrnaeus - poet
- Publius Sulpicius Quirinius - consul
- Quintus Marcius Rufus - commander of Marcus Crassus

== R ==
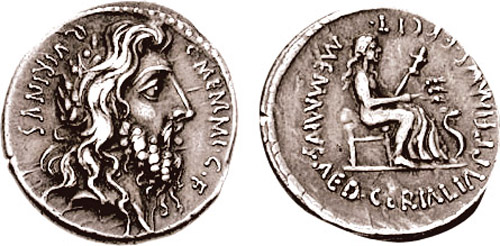
- Roman coin depicting Romulus as Quirinius
  Gaius Rabirius - two; senator and poet
- Gaius Rabirius Postumus - senator
- Lucius Aemilius Regillus - praetor
- Marcus Aqilius Regulus - informer
- Marcus Atilius Regulus - consul
- Publius Memmius Regulus - consul
- Remus - mythical founder
- Reposianus - poet
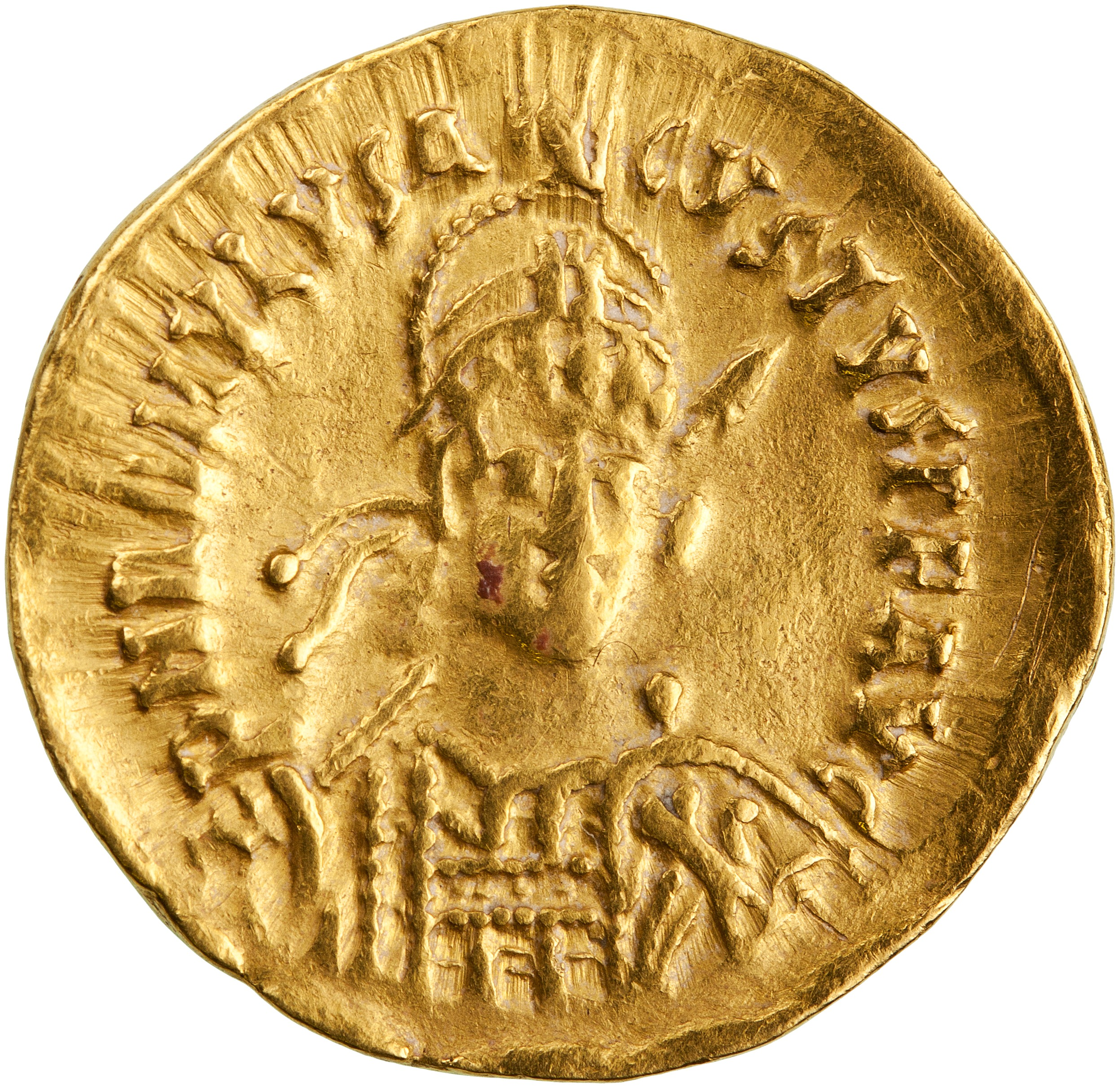
  Solidus of Romulus Augustulus
- Quintus Marcius Rex - two; praetor and consul
- Flavius Ricimer - late patrician
- Romulus - mythical founder
- Romulus Augustulus - last western emperor
- Sextus Roscius - client of Cicero
- Lucius Roscius Otho - tribune
- Quintus Roscius Gallus - actor
- Rubellius Blandus - rhetor
- Gaius Rubellius Blandus - consul
- Rubellius Plautus - relative of Nero
- Rubellia Bassa - half-sister to above
- Rufinus - Christian writer and grammarian
- Flavius Rufinus - adviser to Arcadius
- Curtius Rufus - proconsul
- Quintus Curtius Rufus - rhetor, historian
- Cluvius Rufus - historian
- Publius Servilius Rullus - tribune
- Publius Rupilius - consul
- Gaius Rutilius Gallicus - consul
- Publius Rutilius Lupus - grammarian
- Publius Rutilius Rufus - consul

== S ==
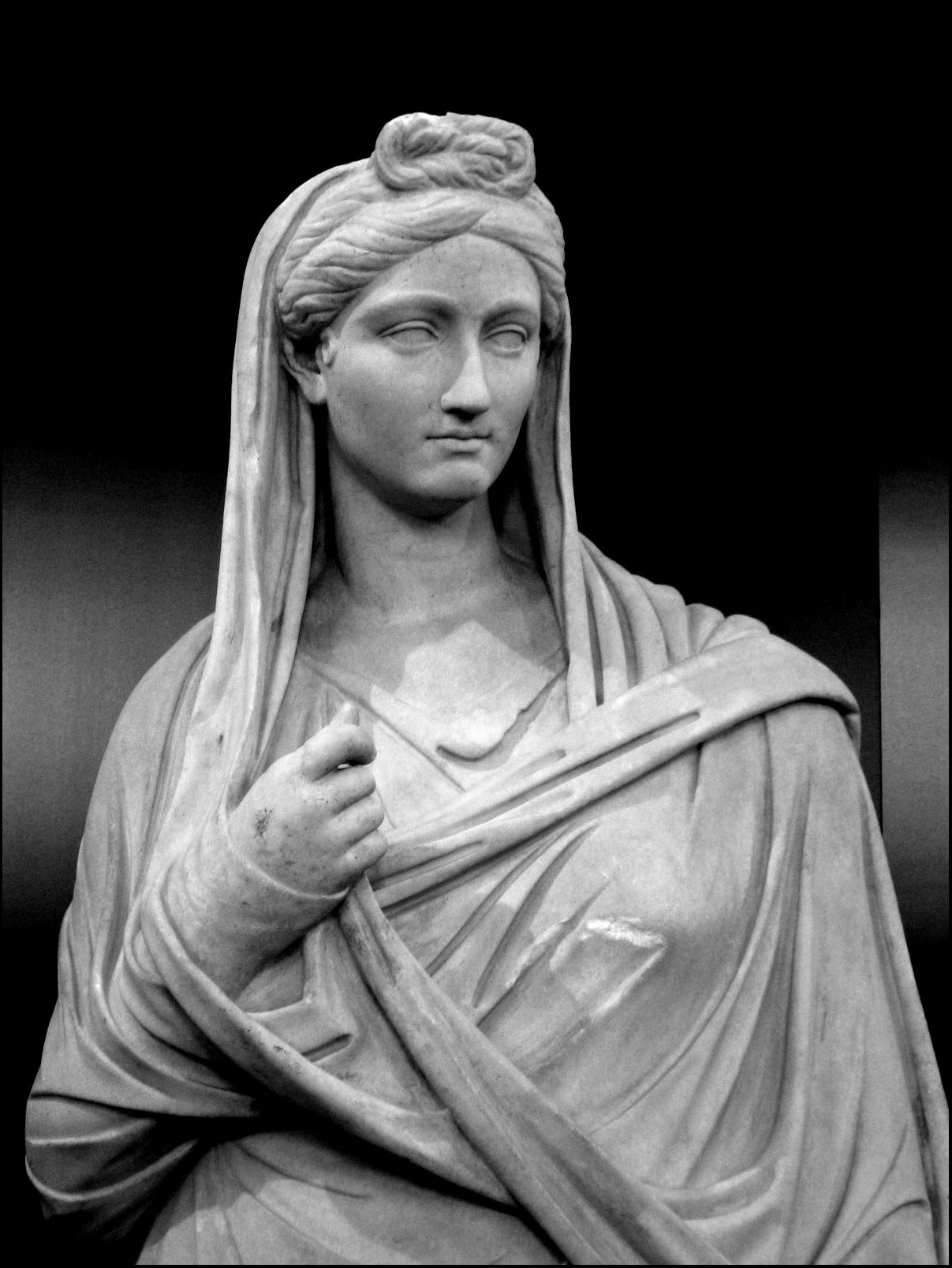
- Statue of Vibia Sabina
  Vibia Sabina - wife of Hadrian
- Sabinus - friend of Ovid
- Titus Flavius Sabinus II - elder brother of Vespasian
- Titus Flavius Sabinus III and IV - consuls
- Masurius Sabinus - jurist
- Marius Plotius Sacerdos - grammarian
- Julius Sacrovir - Aedui noble
- Saevius Nicanor - grammarian
- Marcus Livius Salinator - consul & founder of Forlì
- Sallustius – Neoplatonist author
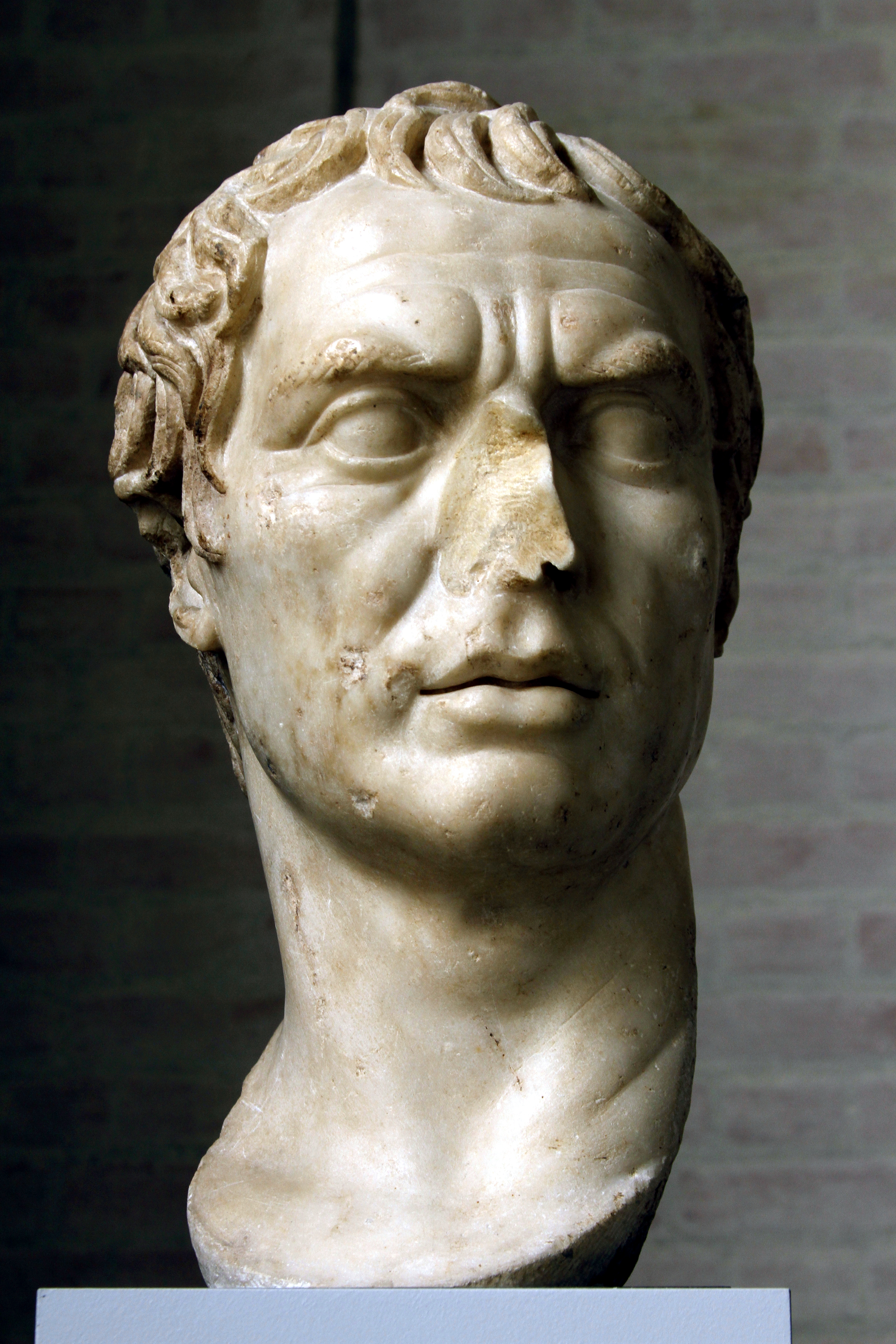
- Bust of Sulla
  Gaius Sallustius Crispus - two; historian (Sallust) and his adopted son
- Gaius Sallustius Passienus Crispus - consul, grandson of Sallust
- Salvianus - writer
- Quintus Salvidienus Rufus - general of Octavian
- Lucius Antonius Saturninus - usurper
- Lucius Appuleius Saturninus - tribune
- Gaius Sentius Saturninus - consul
- Gaius Mucius Scaevola - legendary hero
- Publius Mucius Scaevola - two consuls
- Quintus Mucius Scaevola - two consuls
- Cassius Scaeva - centurion of Julius Caesar's 8th legion
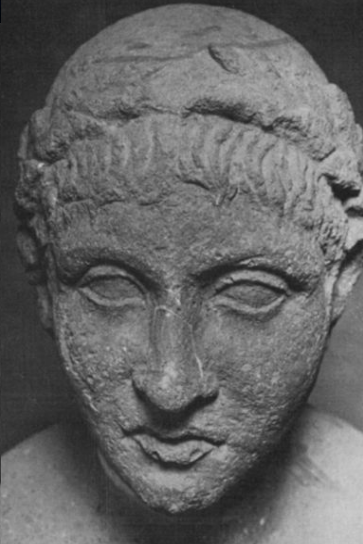
- Depiction of Publius Cornelius Scipio Nasica Corculum

Marcus Aemilius Scaurus - three; two consuls and a praetor

- Lucius Cornelius Scipio - two; consul and son of Scipio Africanus Major
- Publius Cornelius Scipio - two; son of Scipio Africanus Major and father of Scipio Africanus Minor
- Scipio Africanus - general, victor at the Scipio Africanus Second Punic War
- Publius Cornelius Scipio Aemilianus Africanus Minor - general, victor at the Third Punic War
- Lucius Cornelius Scipio Asiaticus - consul
- Lucius Cornelius Scipio Barbatus - consul
- Gnaeus Cornelius Scipio Calvus - consul
- Publius Cornelius Scipio Nasica - consul
- Publius Cornelius Scipio Nasica Corculum - consul
- Publius Cornelius Scipio Salvito - consul
- Publius Cornelius Scipio Nasica Serapio - consul
- Scribonia - wife of Octavian
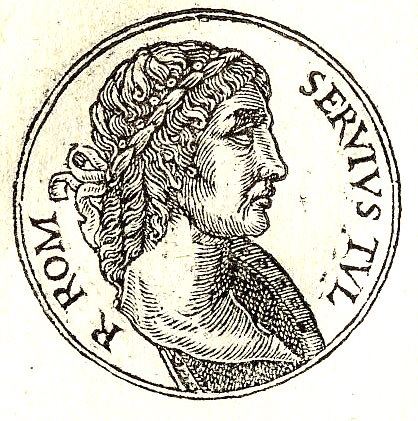
- Depiction of Servius Tullius
  Lucius Arruntius Scribonianus - two; consul and son
- Lucius Scribonius Libo - consul
- Marcus Scribonius Libo Drusus - great-grandson of Pompey
- Scribonius Largus - physician
- Gnaeus Tremellius Scrofa - writer
- Julius Secundus - orator
- Sedulius - Christian Latin poet
- Sejanus, Aelius - prefect of the Praetorian Guard
- Lucius Seius Strabo - A prefect, father of Sejanus
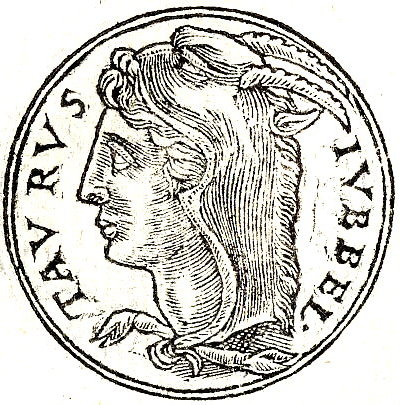
- Depiction of Titus Statilius Taurus
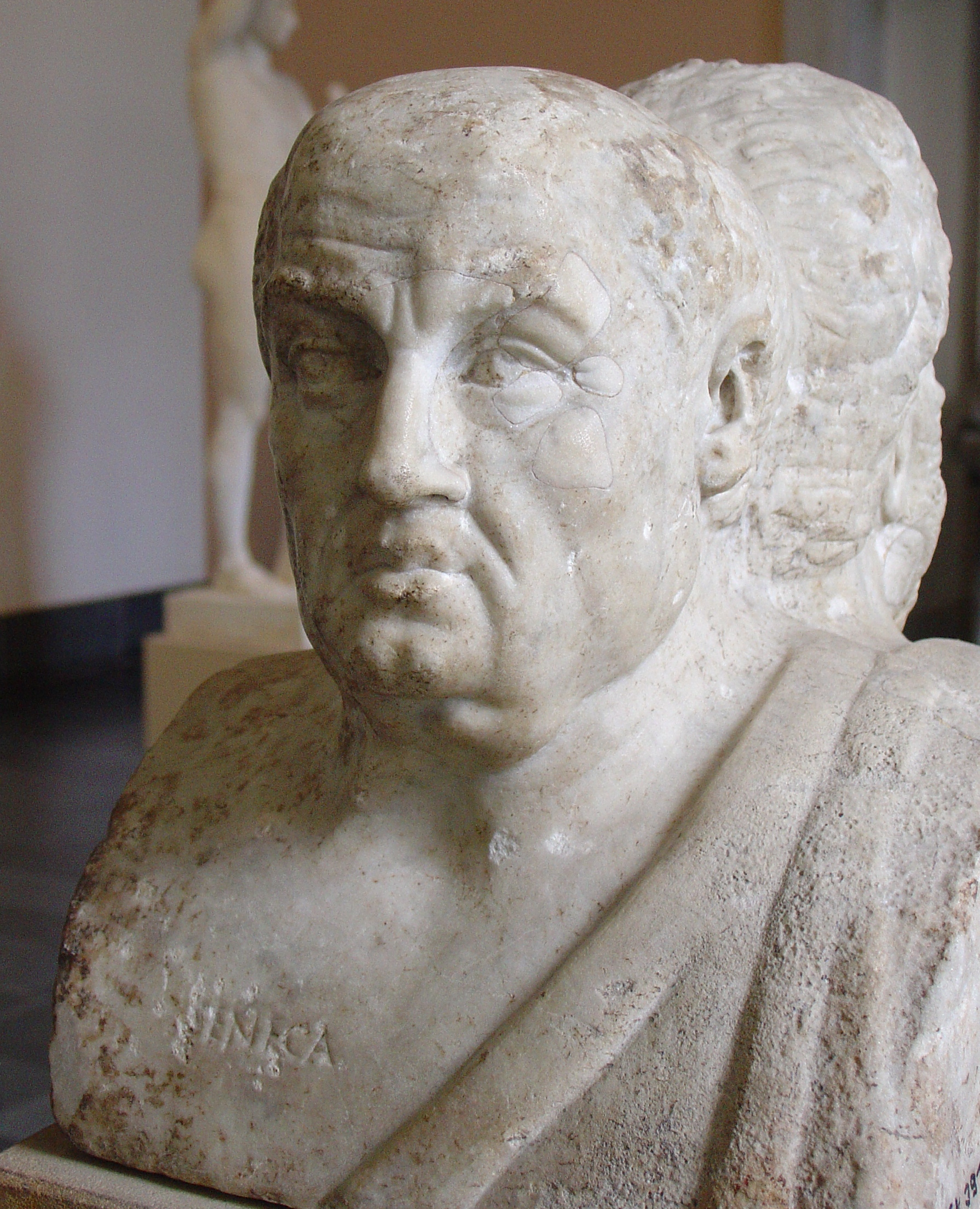
  Bust of Seneca the Younger
  Lucius Annaeus Seneca - two writers, Seneca the Elder and Seneca the Younger
- Senecio, brother of Bassianus (senator)
- Senecio Memmius Afer, senator
- Lucius Alfenus Senecio, last governor of all of Roman Britain
- Marcus Valerius Senecio, governor of Germania Inferior (222-22?)
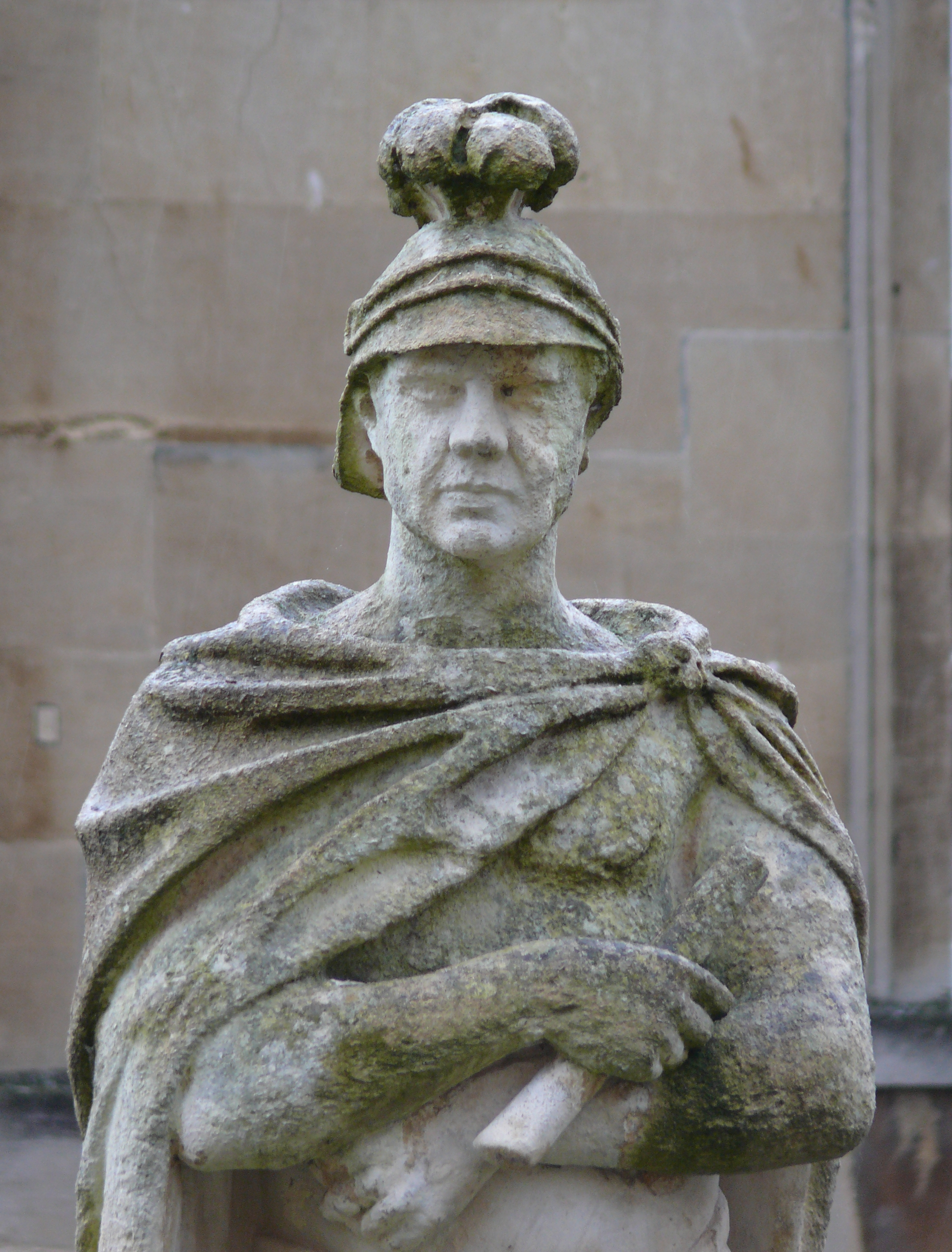
- Statue of Suetonius
  Quintus Sosius Senecio - senator
- Publius Septimius - writer
- Septimius Serenus - poet
- Serenus Sammonicus - writer
- Quintus Serenus - medical writer
- Sergius - multiple people
- Marcus Sergius - tribune with iron hand
- Quintus Sertorius - praetor
- Sulpicius Lupercus Servasius - writer
- Lucius Julius Servianus - consul
- Servilia - mother of Marcus Junius Brutus
- Publius Servilius Vatia Isauricus - consul
- Publius Servilius Isauricus - consul
- Marcus Servilius Nonianus - consul
- Servius - grammarian, commentator
- Servius Tullius - early king
- Publius Sestius - praetor
- Lucius Septimius Severus - emperor
- Marcus Aurelius Severus Alexander - emperor
- Sextus Julius Severus - consul
- Flavius Valerius Severus - emperor
- Sulpicius Severus - historian
- Quintus Sextius - philosopher
- Titus Sextius - governor
- Sextus - two; teacher and writer
- Sextus Empiricus - doctor and philosopher
- Gnaeus Sicinius - tribune
- Siculus Flaccus - grammarian
- Gaius Sollius Apollinaris Sidonius - official, writer
- Decimus Junius Silanus - two; consul and adulterer
- Gaius Junius Silanus - consul
- Gaius Appius Junius Silanus - consul
- Marcus Junius Silanus - three consuls
- Decimus Junius Silanus Torquatus - consul
- Lucius Junius Silanus Torquatus - two; consul and victim
- Marcus Junius Silanus Torquatus - consul
- Gaius Silius - lover of Messalina
- Publius Silius Nerva - consul
- Silius Italicus - consul, poet
- Lucius Cornelius Sisenna - praetor, historian
- Publius Sittius - wealthy businessman
- Gaius Iulius Solinus - geographer
- Gaius Sosius - consul
- Quintus Sosius Senecio - consul
- Titus Vestricius Spurinna - consul
- Staberius Eros - ex-slave scholar
- Titus Statilius Taurus - consul
- Publius Papinius Statius - poet
- Stertinius - writer
- Flavius Stilicho - general
- Lucius Aelius Stilo Praeconinus - scholar
- Gaius Licinius Stolo - early tribune
- Sueis - writer
- Gaius Suetonius Paulinus - consul
- Gaius Suetonius Tranquillus - writer
- Publius Suillius Rufus - consul
- Lucius Cornelius Sulla (Sulla) - dictator
- Publius Cornelius Sulla - consul
- Faustus Cornelius Sulla - son of Sulla
- Sulpicia - two writers
- Servius Sulpicius - poet
- Sulpicius Apollinaris - scholar
- Sulpicius Blitho - historian
- Quintus Sulpicius Camerinus - poet
- Quintus Sulpicius Maximus - boy poet
- Publius Sulpicius Rufus - praetor
- Servius Sulpicius Rufus - consul
- Lucius Licinius Sura - consul
- Quintus Aurelius Symmachus - consul
- Sappho - poet

== T ==
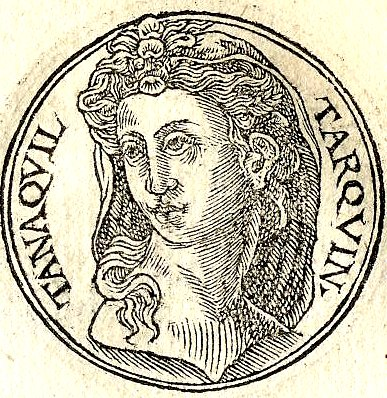
- Depiction of Tanaquil
  Cornelius Tacitus - historian
- Marcus Claudius Tacitus - emperor
- Tanaquil - semi-legendary woman
- Tanusius Geminus - historian
- Lucius Tarius Rufus - consul
- Tarpeia - semi-legendary woman
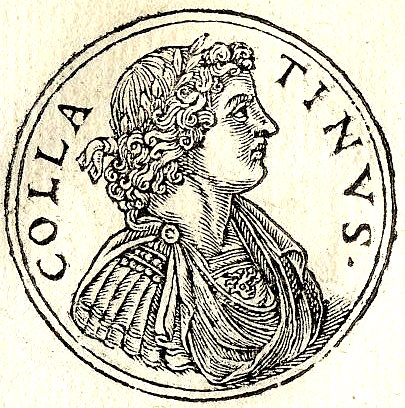
- Depiction of Collatinus
  Lucius Tarquinius Collatinus - semi-legendary founder
- Tarquinius Priscus - king
- Tarquinius Superbus - last king of Rome
- Tarquitius Priscus - writer
- Titus Tatius - king
- Publius Terentius Afer (Terence) - dramatist
- Terentia - first wife of Cicero
- Terentianus Maurus - grammarian
- Quintus Terentius Scaurus - grammarian
- Quintus Septimius Florens Tertullianus (Tertullian) - Christian writer
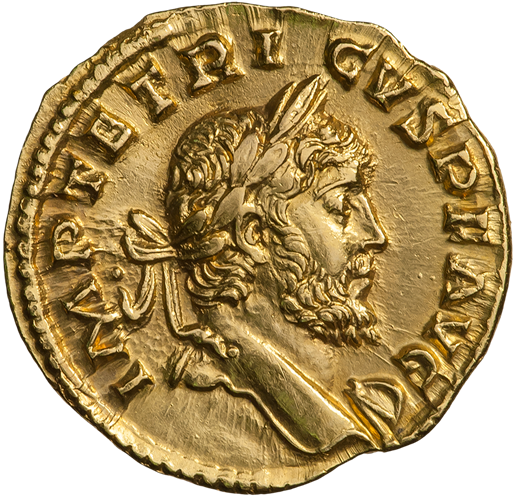
- Coin depicting Tetricus
  Gaius Pius Esuvius Tetricus - emperor
- Theodosius I - emperor
- Theodosius II - emperor
- Publius Clodius Thrasea Paetus - consul
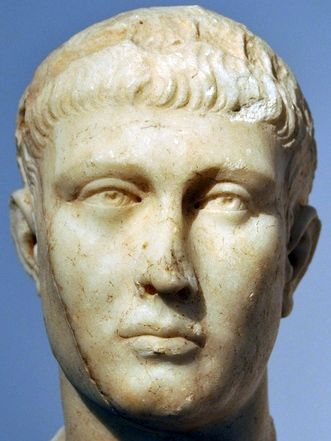
- Bust of Theodosius I
  Tiberius Julius Caesar Augustus (Tiberius) - emperor
- Tiberius Julius Caesar Gemellus - victim
- Tiberius Julius Alexander - Jewish official
- Albius Tibullus - poet
- Gaius Oponius Tigellinus - official
- Gaius Furius Sabinus Aquila Timesitheus - praetorian prefect
- Marcus Tullius Tiro - freedman of Cicero
- Julius Titianus - writer
- Titinius - poet
- Gnaeus Octavius Titinius Capito - general
- Gaius Titius - orator
- Marcus Titius - consul
- Titius Aristo - jurist
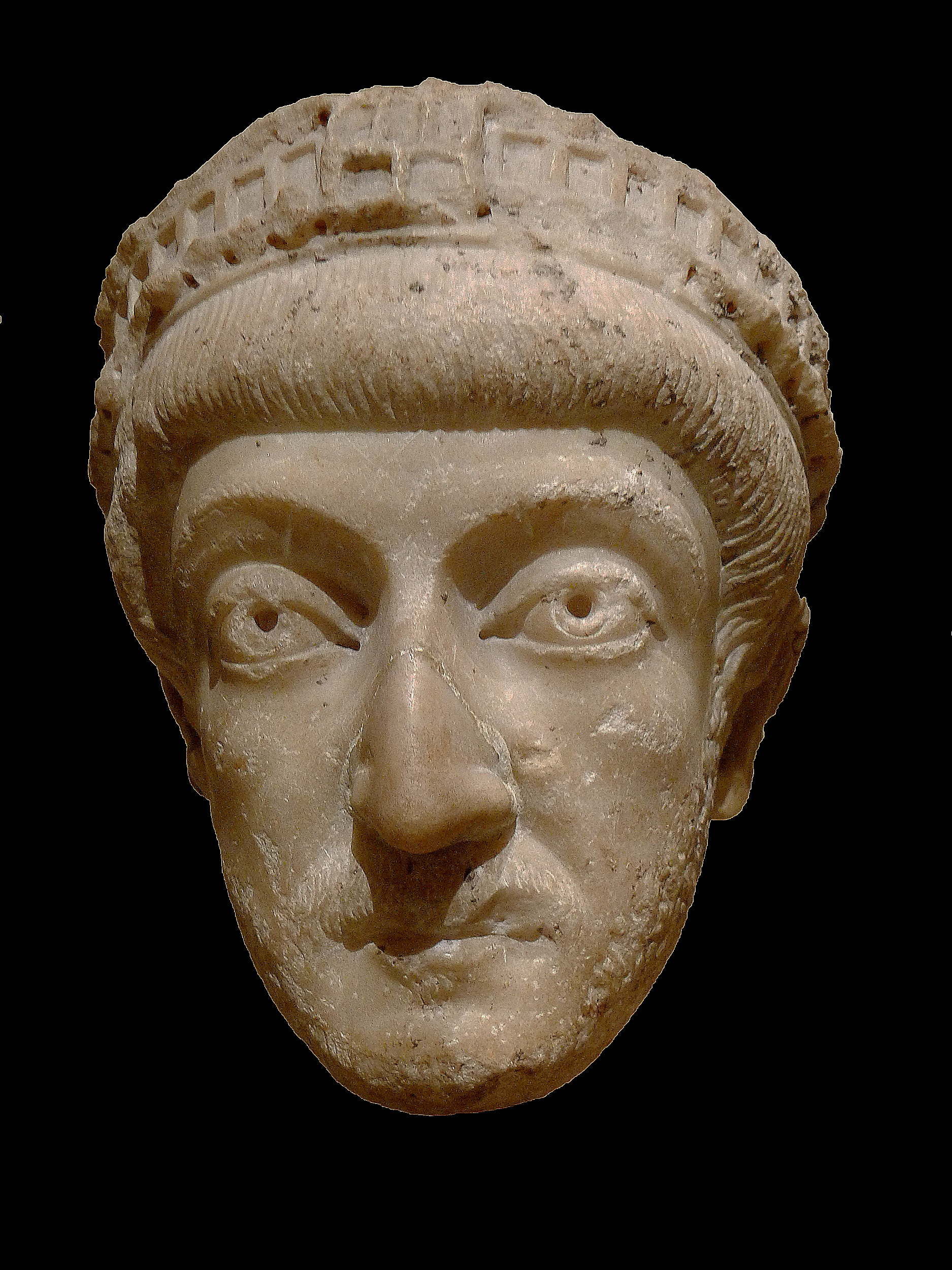
- Bust of Theodosius II
  Gaius Titius Antonius Peculiaris - two; priest and mayor
- Titus Flavius Vespasianus (Titus) - emperor
- Titus Larcius - early dictator
- Titus Manlius Torquatus - two; hero and consul
- Quintus Trabea - writer
- Marcus Ulpius Traianus (Trajan) - emperor
- Gaius Trebatius Testa - jurist
- Trebius Niger - writer
- Gaius Vibius Trebonianus Gallus - emperor
- Gaius Trebonius - proconsul
- Gaius Valerius Triarius - general
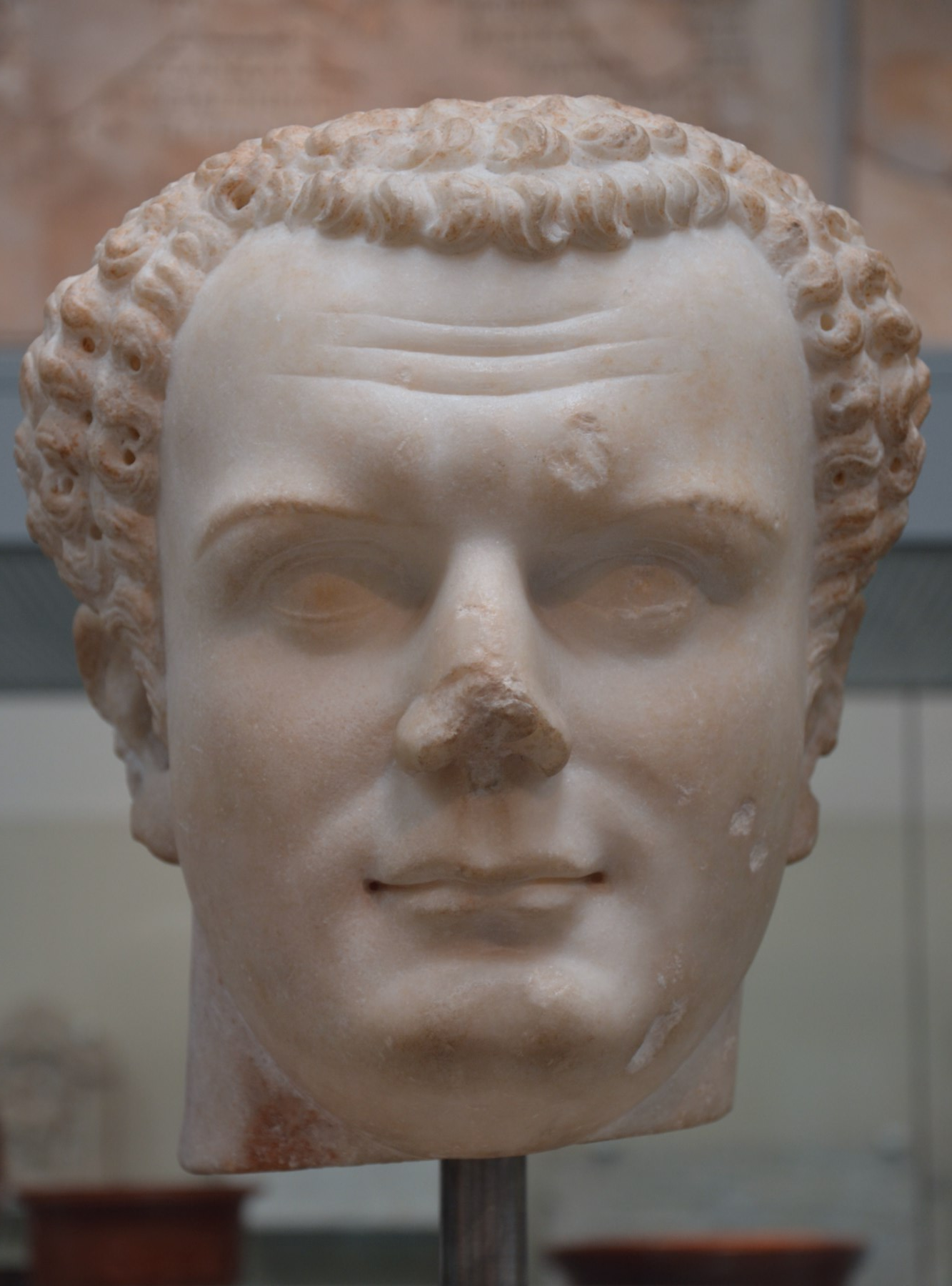
- Bust of Titus
  Tribonianus - jurist collaborator with Justinian I
- Pompeius Trogus - historian
- Lucius Aelius Tubero - friend of Cicero
- Quintus Aelius Tubero - jurist, annalist
- Gaius Sempronius Tuditanus - consul
- Publius Sempronius Tuditanus - consul
- Tullia, villainous daughter of Servius Tullius, the sixth Roman king
- Tullia - daughter of Cicero
- Tullus Hostilius - king
- Quintus Marcius Turbo - official
- Turia - wife of Quintus Lucretius Vespillo, consul
- Turnus - two; legendary hero and satirist
- Sextus Turpilius - writer
- Turrianus Gracilis - writer
- Clodius Turrinus - two rhetoricians
- Tuticanus - friend of Ovid

== U ==
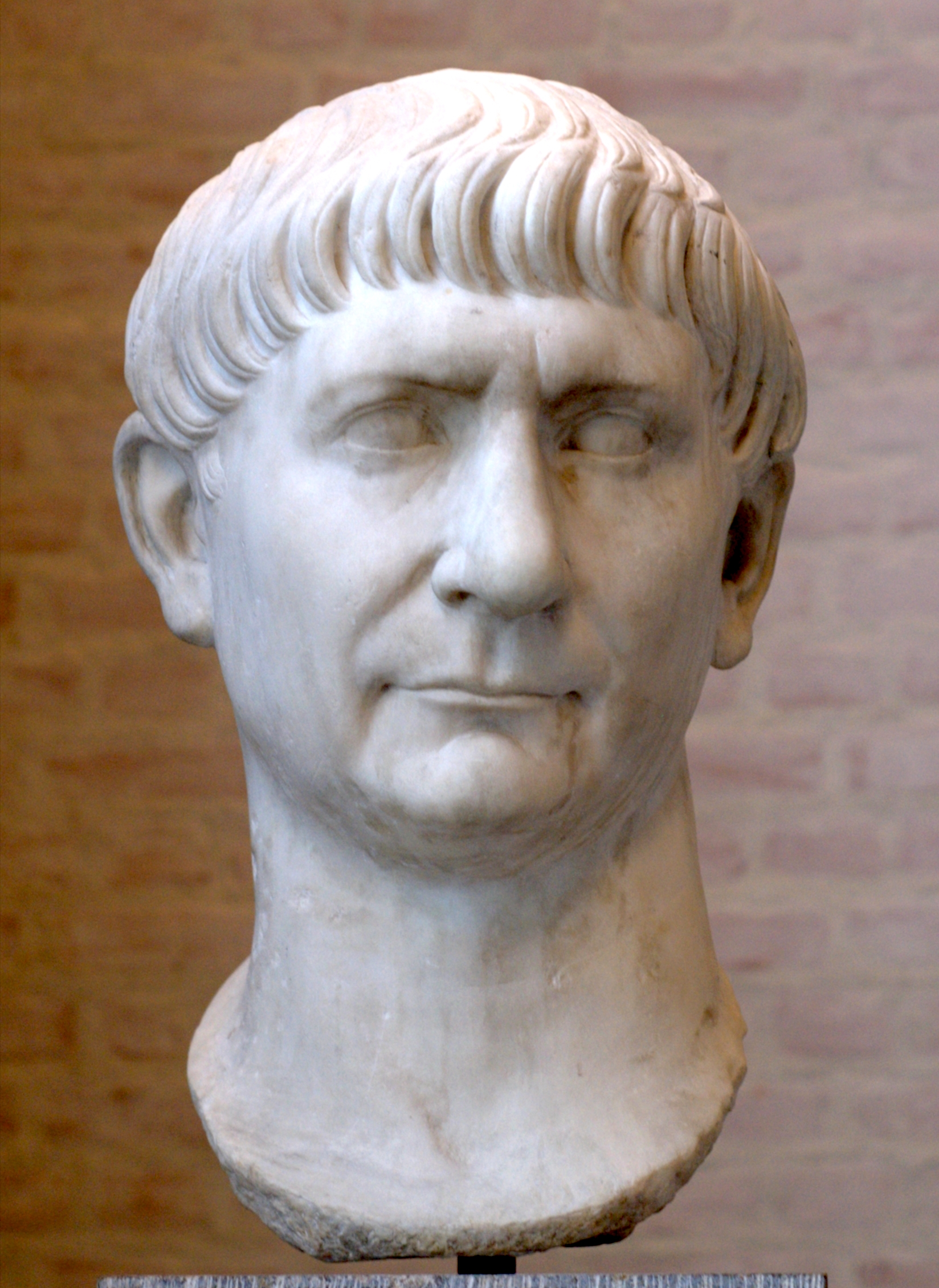
Bust of Trajan

- Ulpia - Grandmother of Hadrian
- Ulpianus of Ascalon - Rhetor
- Domitius Ulpianus - Jurist
- Marcus Ulpius Traianus - Consul, father of Trajan
- Trajan - Emperor
- Urbanus - Possibly fictional usurper during the reign of Aurelian

== V ==
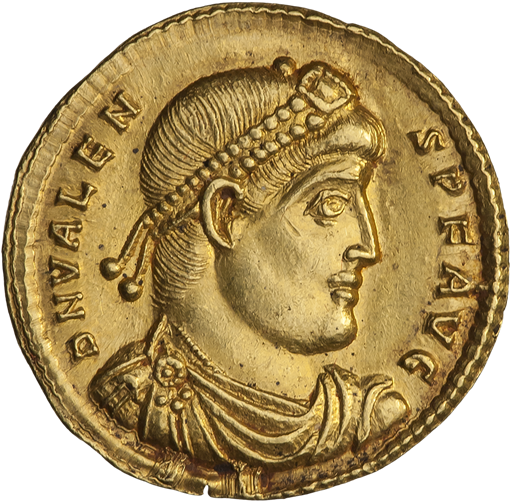
- Solidus depicting Valens
  Septimius Vaballathus - king under Aurelian
- Vagellius - poet
- Valens - emperor
- Fabius Valens - consul
- Vettius Valens - astrologer
- Valentinian I - emperor
- Valentinian II - emperor
- Valentinian III - emperor
- Publius Licinius Valerianus (Valerian) - emperor
- Valerius Aedituus - epigrammatist
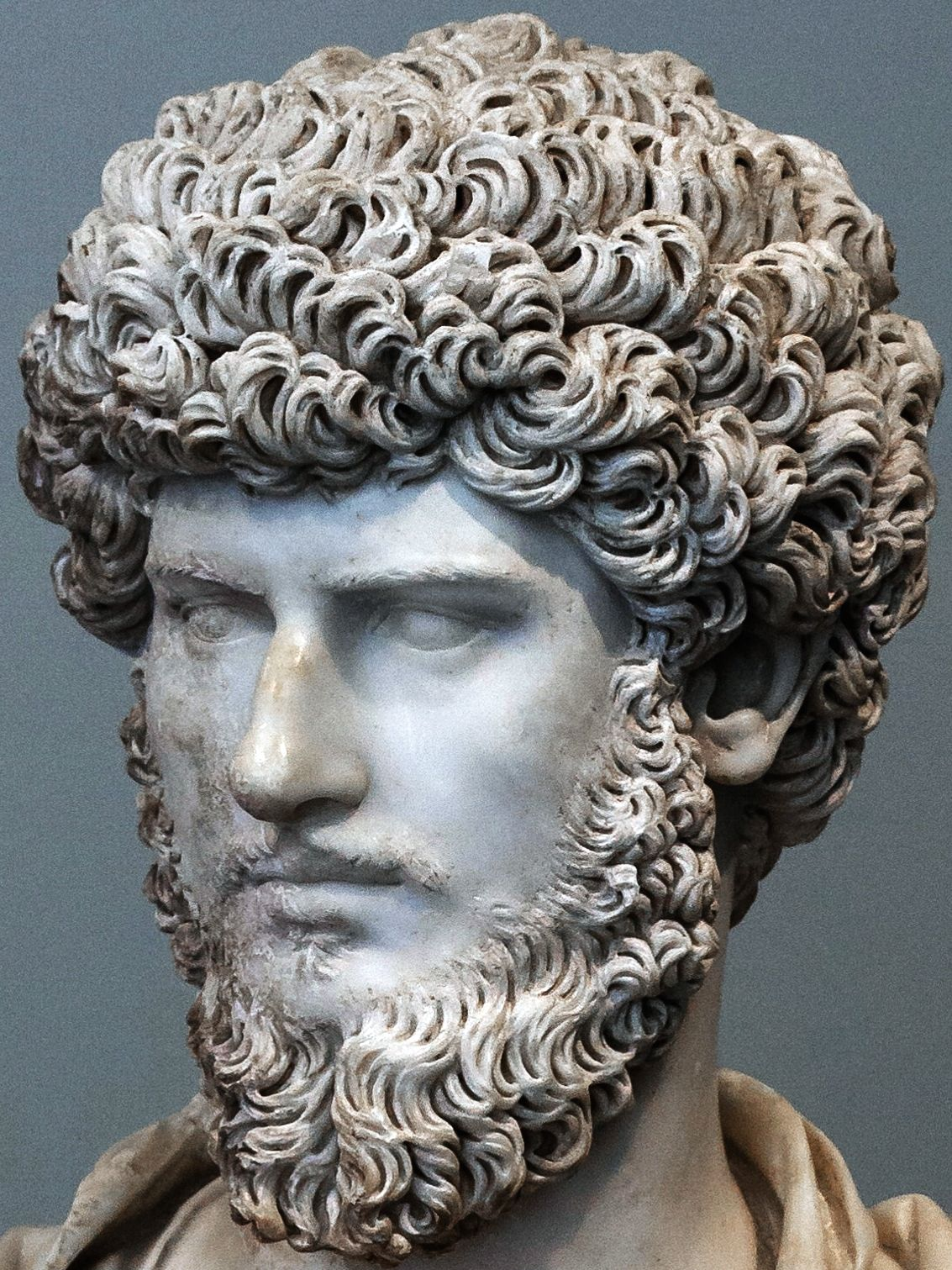
- Bust of Lucius Verus
  Valerius Antias - annalist
- Decimus Valerius Asiaticus - consul
- Publius Valerius Cato - scholar, poet
- Marcus Valerius Corvus - hero
- Gaius Calpetanus Valerius Festus - consul
- Gaius Valerius Flaccus - poet
- Lucius Valerius Licinianus - orator
- Valerius Maximus - historian
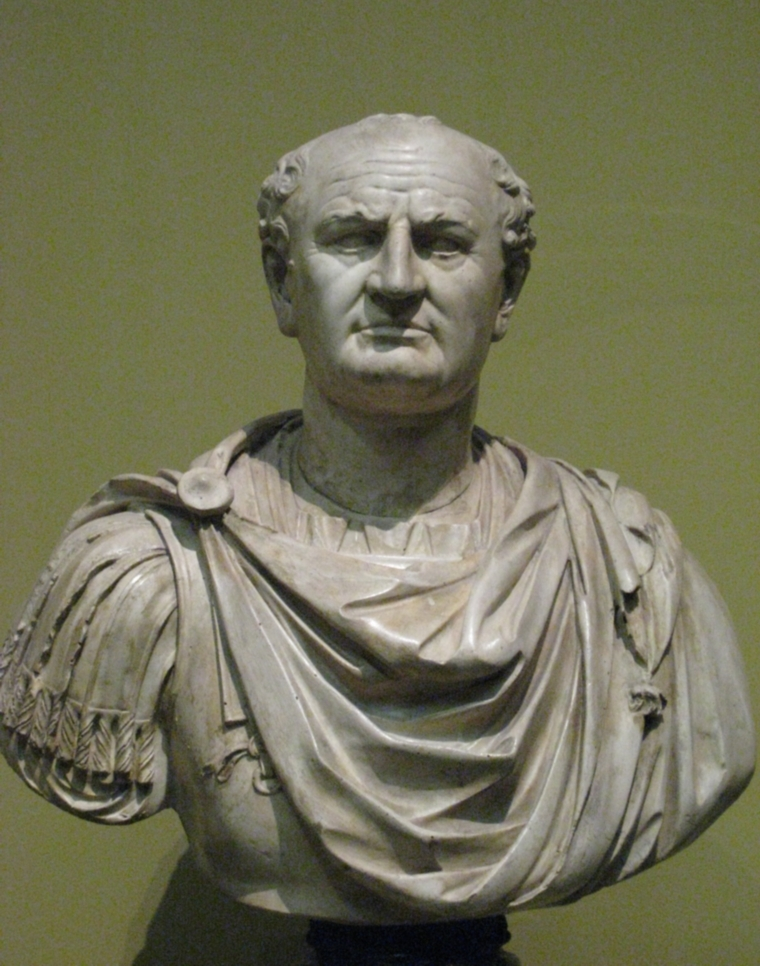
- Bust of Vespasian
  Publius Valerius Poplicola - early consul
- Lucius Valerius Potitus - three consuls
- Quintus Valerius Soranus - scholar
- Quintus Valerius Orca - praetor
- Valgius Rufus - consul
- Vallius Syriacus - rhetor
- Varenus Rufus - Governor of Bithynia-Pontus
- Quintus Vargunteius - lecturer
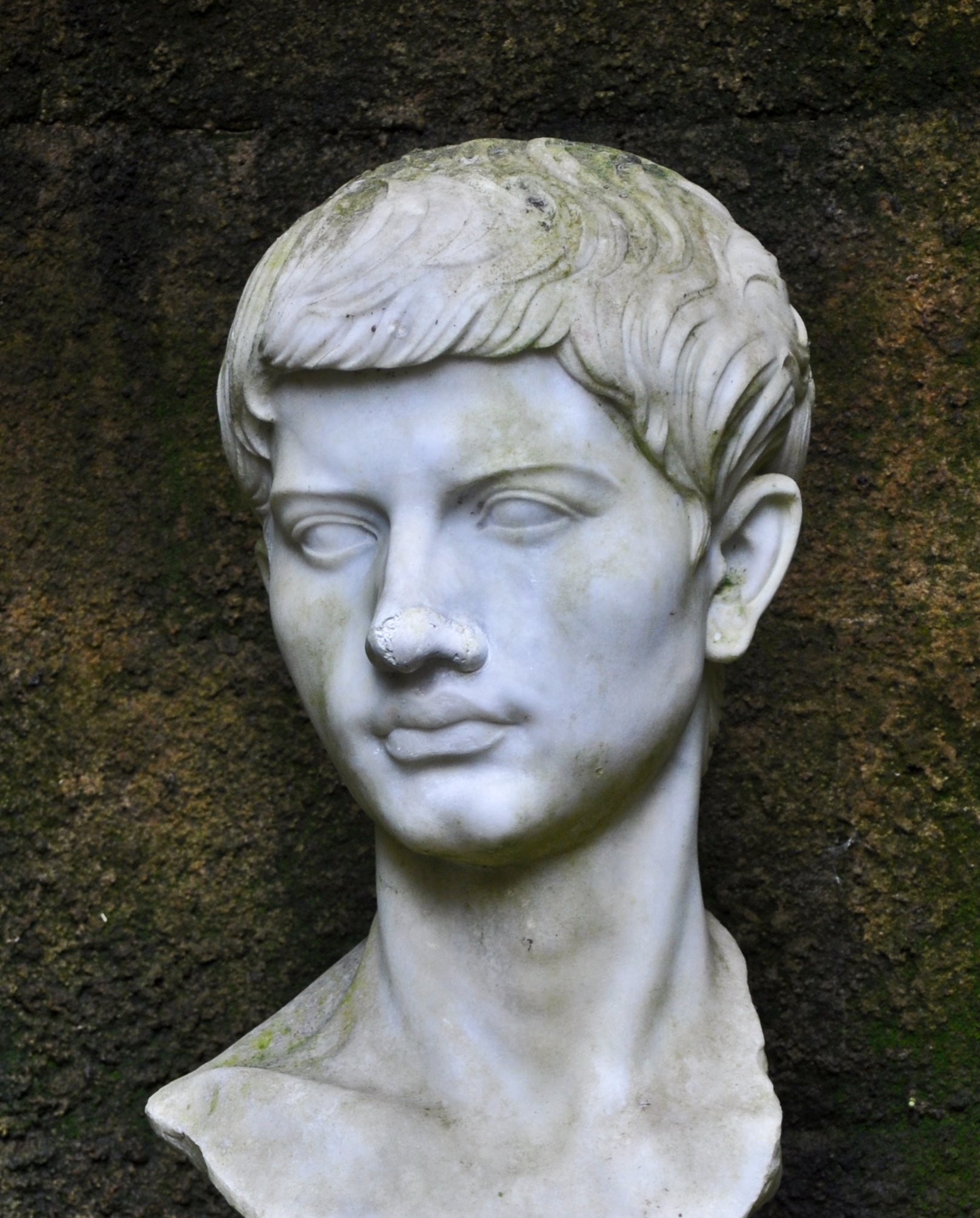
- Bust of Virgil
  Quintus Varius - tribune
- Varius Rufus - poet
- Gaius Terentius Varro - consul
- Marcus Terentius Varro - encyclopedist
- Publius Terentius Varro Atacinus - writer
- Aulus Terentius Varro Murena - writer
- Publius Attius Varus - governor
- Publius Quinctilius Varus - general
- Quinctilius Varus - son of general
- Arrius Varus - praetorian prefect
- Julianus Vatinius - general
- Publius Vatinius - consul
- Publius Vedius Pollio - freedman's son
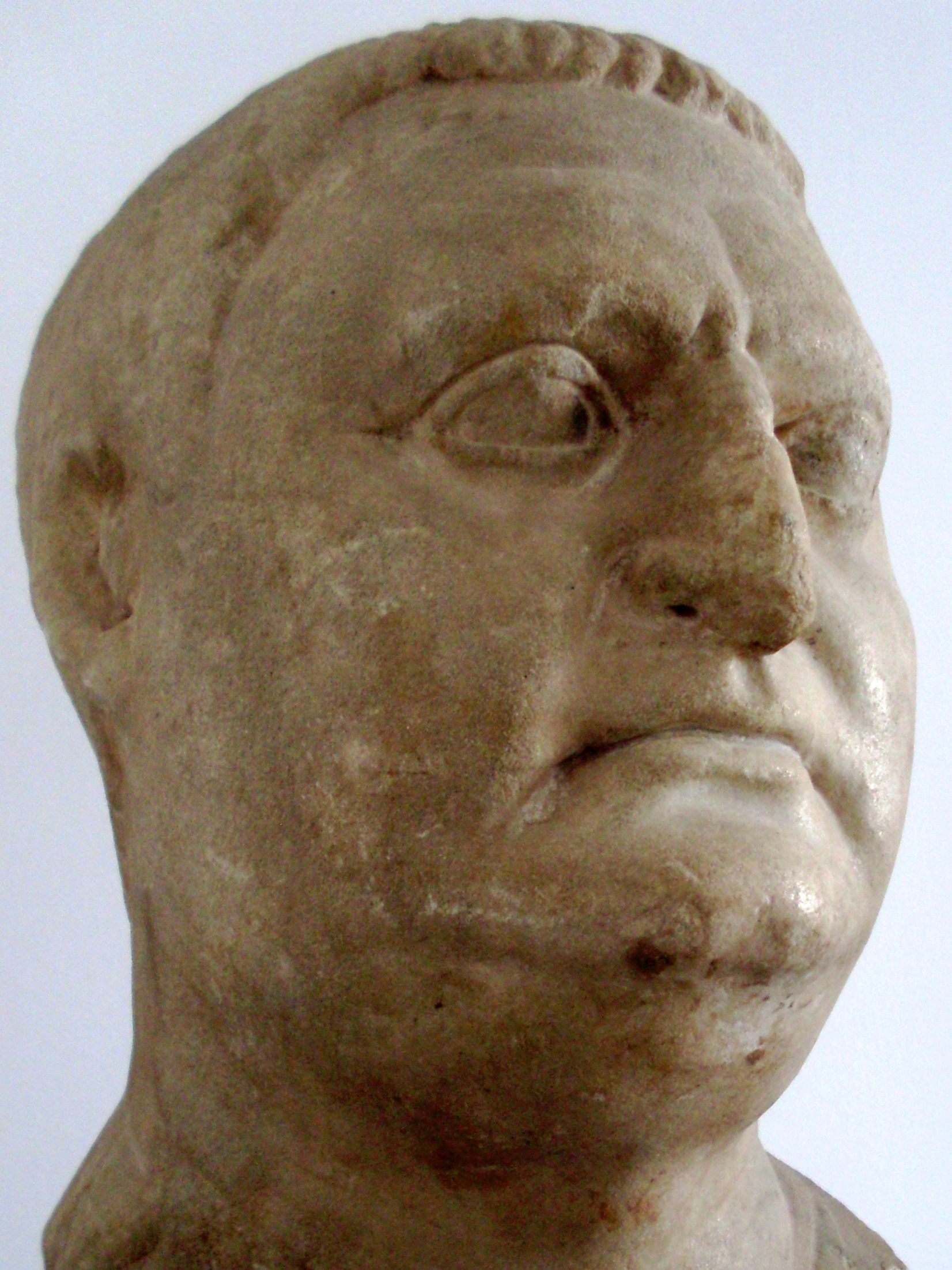
  Bust of Vitellius
- Flavius Vegetius Renatus - writer
- Aulus Didius Gallus Fabricius Veiento - consul
- Velius Longus - scholar
- Velleius Paterculus - historian
- Venantius Honorius Clementianus Fortunatus - poet
- Vennonius - historian
- Publius Ventidius - consul
- Ventidius Cumanus - procurator of Judea
- Verginia - legendary victim
- Verginius Flavus - teacher
- Lucius Verginius Rufus - consul and leader of rebellion against Nero
- Gaius Verres - proconsul
- Lucius Verus - emperor
- Titus Flavius Vespasianus (Vespasian) - emperor
- Lucius Vettius - accuser
- Vettius Philocomus - friend of Lucilius
- Lucius Vettius Scato - praetor
- Vettius Valens - astronomer/astrologer
- Caelius Vibenna - semi-legendary figure who gave his name to the Caelian hill, but real Etruscan from Vulci, Caile Vipinas
- Quintus Vibius Crispus - consul
- Gaius Vibius Marsus - consul
- Gaius Vibius Maximus - consul
- Gaius Vibius Rufus - consul
- Gaius Marius Victorinus - writer
- Maximus Victorinus - grammarian
- Lucius Villius Annalis - tribune
- Gaius Julius Vindex - rebel
- Lucius Vinicius - two; father and son, both consuls
- Marcus Vinicius - consul
- Publius Vinicius - consul
- Titus Vinius - consul
- Vipsania Julia - granddaughter of Augustus
- Publius Vergilius Maro (Virgil) - writer
- Viriathus - semi-legendary writer
- Aulus Vitellius - emperor
- Lucius Vitellius - consul
- Vitruvius - architect
- Gaius Dillius Vocula - legate
- Volcatius Sedigitus - writer
- Volcacius Moschus - writer
- Lucius Voltacilius Pitholaus
- Publius Volumnius - philosopher, companion of Brutus
- Gnaeus Manlius Vulso - Consul who led a campaign during the Galatian War
- Lucius Manlius Vulso Longus - Consul and general during the First Punic War

== See also ==
- List of Roman emperors
- List of Roman generals
- List of Roman women
- Political institutions of ancient Rome#Lists of individual office holders
- List of ancient doctors
