= Classical Latin =

Literary form of the Latin language

- LINGVA·LATINA, lingua·latīna
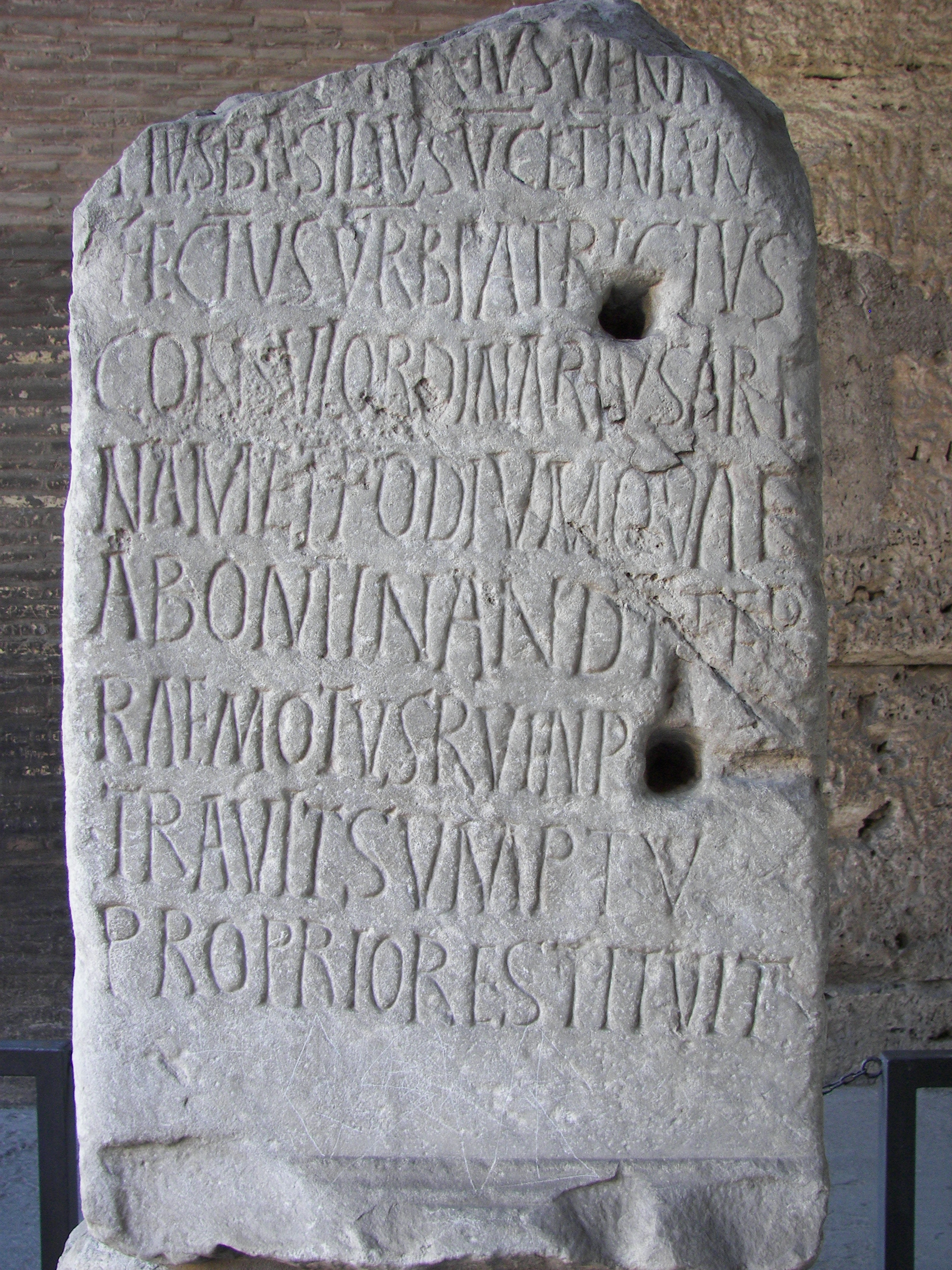
- Latin inscription in the Colosseum
- Pronunciation: [ˈlɪŋɡʷa ɫaˈtiːna]
- Native to: Roman Republic, Roman Empire
- Region: Roman-ruled lands
- Era: 75 BC to 3rd century AD, when it developed into Late Latin
- Language family: Indo-European: Italic; Latino-Faliscan; Latin; Classical Latin
- Early form: Old Latin
- Writing system: Classical Latin alphabet

Official status
- Official language in: Roman Republic, Roman Empire
- Regulated by: Schools of grammar and rhetoric

Language codes
- ISO 639-3: –
- Linguist List: lat-cla
- Glottolog: None
- Linguasphere: 51-AAB-aaa

Classical Latin is the form of Latin recognized as a literary standard by writers of the late Roman Republic and early Roman Empire. It developed around 75 BC from Old Latin, and developed by the 3rd century AD into Late Latin. In some later periods, the former was regarded as good or proper Latin, while the latter was seen as debased, degenerate, or corrupted. The word Latin is now understood by default to mean "Classical Latin"; for example, modern Latin textbooks almost exclusively teach Classical Latin.

Cicero and his contemporaries of the late republic referred to the Latin language, in contrast to other languages such as Greek, as lingua latina or sermo latinus. They distinguished the common vernacular, however, as Vulgar Latin (sermo vulgaris and sermo vulgi), in contrast to the higher register that they called latinitas, sometimes translated as "Latinity". (Note: When rarely used in English, the term is capitalized: Latinitas.) Latinitas was also called sermo familiaris ("speech of the good families"), sermo urbanus ("speech of the city"), and in rare cases sermo nobilis ("noble speech"). Besides the noun Latinitas, it was referred to with the adverb latine ("in (good) Latin", literally "Latinly") or its comparative latinius ("in better Latin", literally "more Latinly").

Latinitas was spoken and written. It was the language taught in schools. Prescriptive rules therefore applied to it, and when special subjects like poetry or rhetoric were taken into consideration, additional rules applied. Since spoken Latinitas has become extinct (in favor of subsequent registers), the rules of politus (polished) texts may give the appearance of an artificial language. However, Latinitas was a form of sermo (spoken language), and as such, retains spontaneity. No texts by Classical Latin authors are noted for the type of rigidity evidenced by stylized art, with the exception of repetitious abbreviations and stock phrases found on inscriptions.

The standards, authors and manuals from the Classical Latin period formed the model for the language taught and used in later periods across Europe and beyond. While the Latin used in different periods deviated from "Classical" Latin, efforts were periodically made to relearn and reapply the models of the Classical period, for instance by Alcuin during the reign of Charlemagne, and later during the Renaissance, producing the highly classicising form of Latin now known as Neo-Latin.

== Philological constructs ==
=== Classical ===
"Good Latin" in philology is known as "classical" Latin literature. The term refers to the canonical relevance of literary works written in Latin in the late Roman Republic, and early to middle Roman Empire. "[T]hat is to say, that of belonging to an exclusive group of authors (or works) that were considered to be emblematic of a certain genre." The term classicus (masculine plural classici) was devised by the Romans to translate Greek ἐγκριθέντες (egkrithéntes) 'the approved ones', and "select" which refers to authors who wrote in a form of Greek that was considered model. Before then, the term classis, in addition to being a naval fleet, was a social class in one of the diachronic divisions of Roman society in accordance with property ownership under the Roman constitution. The word is a transliteration of Greek κλῆσις (klêsis) 'call', used to rank army draftees by property from first to fifth class.

Classicus refers to those in the prima classis ("first class"), such as the authors of polished works of Latinitas, or sermo urbanus. It contains nuances of the certified and the authentic, or testis classicus ("reliable witness"). It was under this construct that Marcus Cornelius Fronto (an African-Roman lawyer and language teacher) used scriptores classici ("first-class" or "reliable authors") in the second century AD. Their works were viewed as models of good Latin. This is the first known reference (possibly innovated during this time) to Classical Latin applied by authors, evidenced in the authentic language of their works.

=== Canonical ===
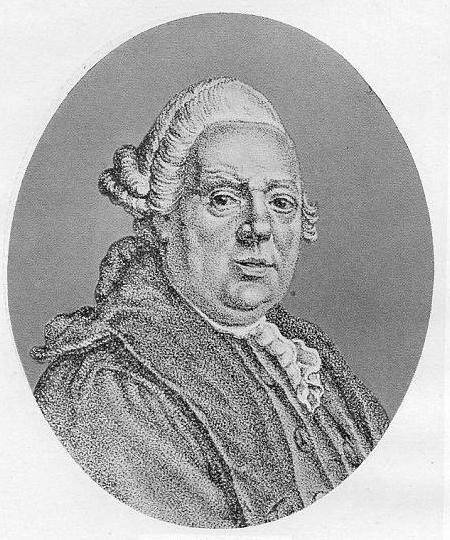
David Ruhnken

Imitating Greek grammarians, Romans such as Quintilian drew up lists termed indices or ordines modeled after the ones created by the Greeks, which were called pinakes. The Greek lists were considered classical, or recepti scriptores ("select writers"). Aulus Gellius includes authors like Plautus, who are considered writers of Old Latin and not strictly in the period of classical Latin. The classical Romans distinguished Old Latin as prisca Latinitas and not sermo vulgaris. Each author's work in the Roman lists was considered equivalent to one in the Greek. For example, Ennius was the Latin Homer, the Aeneid was the equivalent of the Iliad, etc. The lists of classical authors were as far as the Roman grammarians went in developing a philology. The topic remained at that point while interest in the classici scriptores declined in the medieval period as the best form of the language yielded to medieval Latin, inferior to classical standards.

The Renaissance saw a revival in Roman culture, and with it, the return of Classic ("the best") Latin. Thomas Sébillet's Art Poétique (1548), "les bons et classiques poètes françois", refers to Jean de Meun and Alain Chartier, who the first modern application of the words. According to Merriam Webster's Collegiate Dictionary, the term 'classical' (from classicus) entered modern English in 1599, some 50 years after its re-introduction to the continent. In Governor William Bradford's Dialogue (1648), he referred to synods of a separatist church as "classical meetings", defined by meetings between "young men" from New England and "ancient men" from Holland and England. In 1715, Laurence Echard's Classical Geographical Dictionary was published. In 1736, Robert Ainsworth's Thesaurus Linguae Latinae Compendarius turned English words and expressions into "proper and classical Latin." In 1768, David Ruhnken's Critical History of the Greek Orators recast the molded view of the classical by applying the word "canon" to the pinakes of orators after the Biblical canon, or list of authentic books of the Bible. In doing so, Ruhnken had secular catechism in mind.

=== Ages of Latin ===
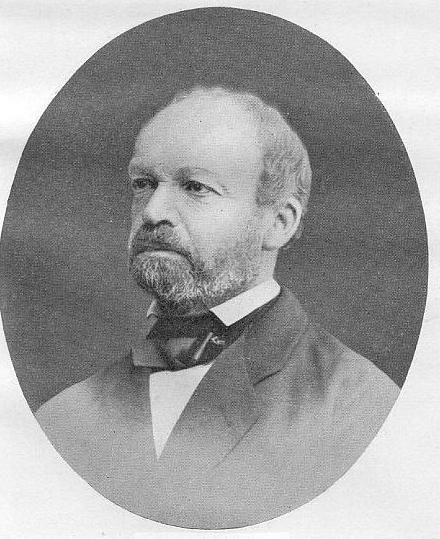
Wilhelm Sigismund Teuffel

In 1870, Wilhelm Sigismund Teuffel's Geschichte der Römischen Literatur (A History of Roman Literature) defined the philological notion of classical Latin through a typology similar to the Ages of Man, setting out the Golden and Silver Ages of classical Latin. Wilhem Wagner, who published Teuffel's work in German, also produced an English translation which he published in 1873. Teuffel's classification, still in use today (with modifications), groups classical Latin authors into periods defined by political events rather than by style.

Teuffel went on to publish other editions, but the English translation of A History of Roman Literature gained immediate success.

In 1877, Charles Thomas Cruttwell produced a similar work in English. In his preface, Cruttwell notes "Teuffel's admirable history, without which many chapters in the present work could not have attained completeness." He also credits Wagner.

Cruttwell adopts the time periods found in Teuffel's work, but he presents a detailed analysis of style, whereas Teuffel was more concerned with history. Like Teuffel, Cruttwell encountered issues while attempting to condense the voluminous details of time periods in an effort to capture the meaning of phases found in their various writing styles. Like Teuffel, he has trouble finding a name for the first of the three periods (the current Old Latin phase), calling it "from Livius to Sulla." He says the language "is marked by immaturity of art and language, by a vigorous but ill-disciplined imitation of Greek poetical models, and in prose by a dry sententiousness of style, gradually giving way to a clear and fluent strength..." These abstracts have little meaning to those not well-versed in Latin literature. In fact, Cruttwell admits "The ancients, indeed, saw a difference between Ennius, Pacuvius, and Accius, but it may be questioned whether the advance would be perceptible by us."

In time, some of Cruttwell's ideas become established in Latin philology. While praising the application of rules to classical Latin (most intensely in the Golden Age, he says "In gaining accuracy, however, classical Latin suffered a grievous loss. It became cultivated as distinct from a natural language... Spontaneity, therefore, became impossible and soon invention also ceased... In a certain sense, therefore, Latin was studied as a dead language, while it was still a living."

Also problematic in Teuffel's scheme is its appropriateness to the concept of classical Latin. Cruttwell addresses the issue by altering the concept of the classical. The "best" Latin is defined as "golden" Latin, the second of the three periods. The other two periods (considered "classical") are left hanging. By assigning the term "pre-classical" to Old Latin and implicating it to post-classical (or post-Augustan) and silver Latin, Cruttwell realized that his construct was not accordance with ancient usage and assertions: "[T]he epithet classical is by many restricted to the authors who wrote in it [golden Latin]. It is best, however, not to narrow unnecessarily the sphere of classicity; to exclude Terence on the one hand or Tacitus and Pliny on the other, would savour of artificial restriction rather than that of a natural classification." The contradiction remains—Terence is, and is not a classical author, depending on the context.

== Authors of the Golden Age ==
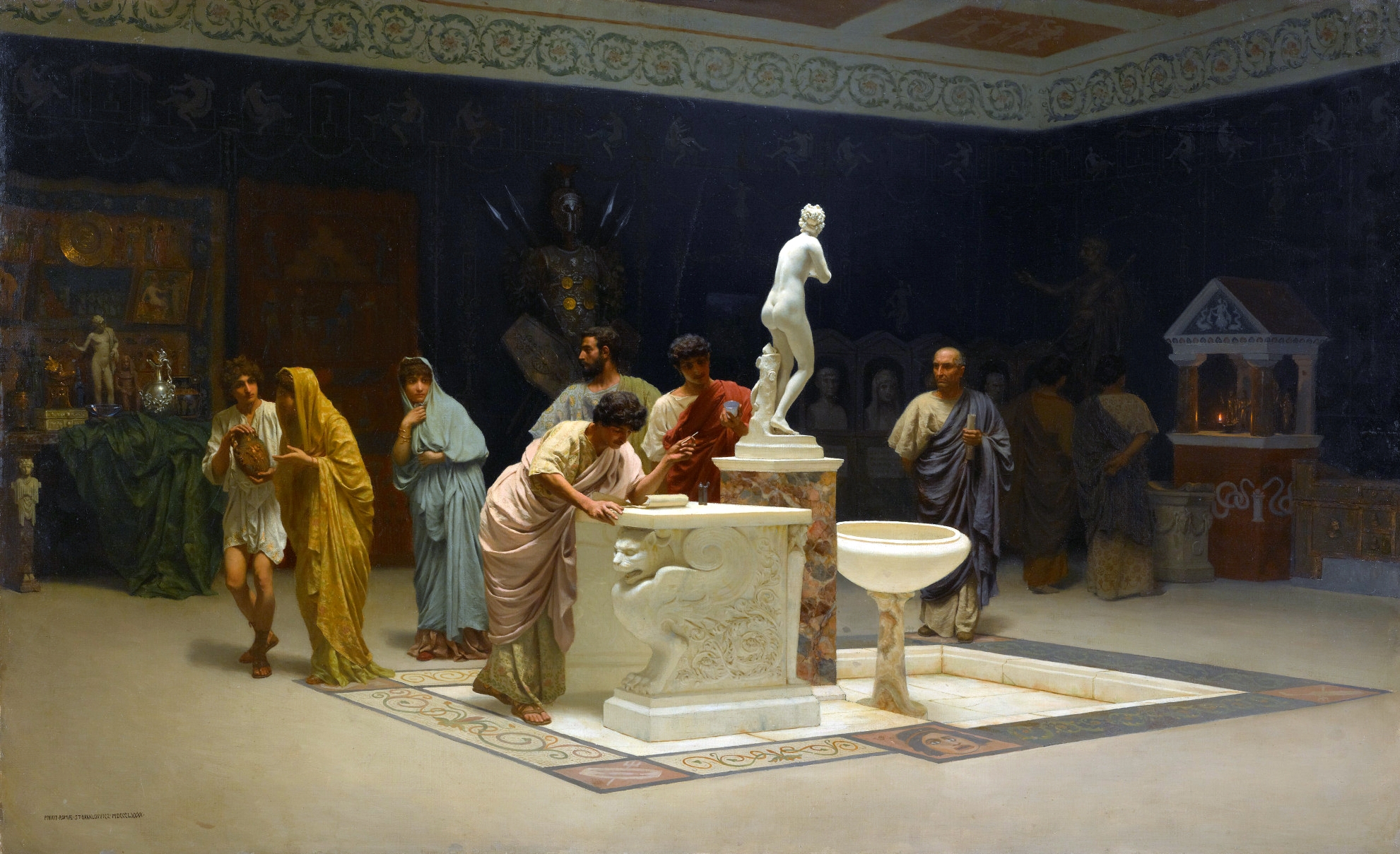
At Maecenas' Reception, oil, Stefan Bakałowicz, 1890. An artist's view of the classical. Maecenas knew and entertained everyone literary in the Golden Age, especially Augustus.

Teuffel's definition of the "First Period" of Latin was based on inscriptions, fragments, and the literary works of the earliest known authors. Though he does use the term "Old Roman" at one point, most of these findings remain unnamed. Teuffel presents the Second Period in his major work, das goldene Zeitalter der römischen Literatur (Golden Age of Roman Literature), dated 671–767 AUC (83 BC – AD 14), according to his own recollection. The timeframe is marked by the dictatorship of Lucius Cornelius Sulla Felix and the death of the emperor Augustus. Wagner's translation of Teuffel's writing is as follows:

The golden age of the Roman literature is that period in which the climax was reached in the perfection of form, and in most respects also in the methodical treatment of the subject-matters. It may be subdivided between the generations, in the first of which (the Ciceronian Age) prose culminated, while poetry was principally developed in the Augustan Age.

The Ciceronian Age was dated 671–711 AUC (83–43 BC), ending just after the death of Marcus Tullius Cicero. The Augustan 711–67 AUC (43 BC – AD 14) ends with the death of Augustus. The Ciceronian Age is further divided by the consulship of Cicero in 691 AUC (63 BC) into a first and second half. Authors are assigned to these periods by years of principal achievements.

The Golden Age had already made an appearance in German philology, but in a less systematic way. In a translation of Bielfeld's Elements of universal erudition (1770):

The Second Age of Latin began about the time of Caesar [his ages are different from Teuffel's], and ended with Tiberius. This is what is called the Augustan Age, which was perhaps of all others the most brilliant, a period at which it should seem as if the greatest men, and the immortal authors, had met together upon the earth, in order to write the Latin language in its utmost purity and perfection... and of Tacitus, his conceits and sententious style is not that of the golden age...

Evidently, Teuffel received ideas about golden and silver Latin from an existing tradition and embedded them in a new system, transforming them as he thought best.

In Cruttwell's introduction, the Golden Age is dated 80 BC – AD 14 (from Cicero to Ovid), which corresponds to Teuffel's findings. Of the "Second Period", Cruttwell paraphrases Teuffel by saying it "represents the highest excellence in prose and poetry." The Ciceronian Age (known today as the "Republican Period") is dated 80–42 BC, marked by the Battle of Philippi. Cruttwell omits the first half of Teuffel's Ciceronian, and starts the Golden Age at Cicero's consulship in 63 BC—an error perpetuated in Cruttwell's second edition. He likely meant 80 BC, as he includes Varro in Golden Latin. Teuffel's Augustan Age is Cruttwell's Augustan Epoch (42 BC – AD 14).

=== Republican ===
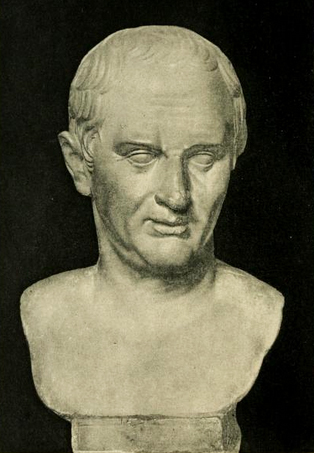
Marcus Tullius Cicero, after whom Teuffel named his Ciceronian period of the Golden Age

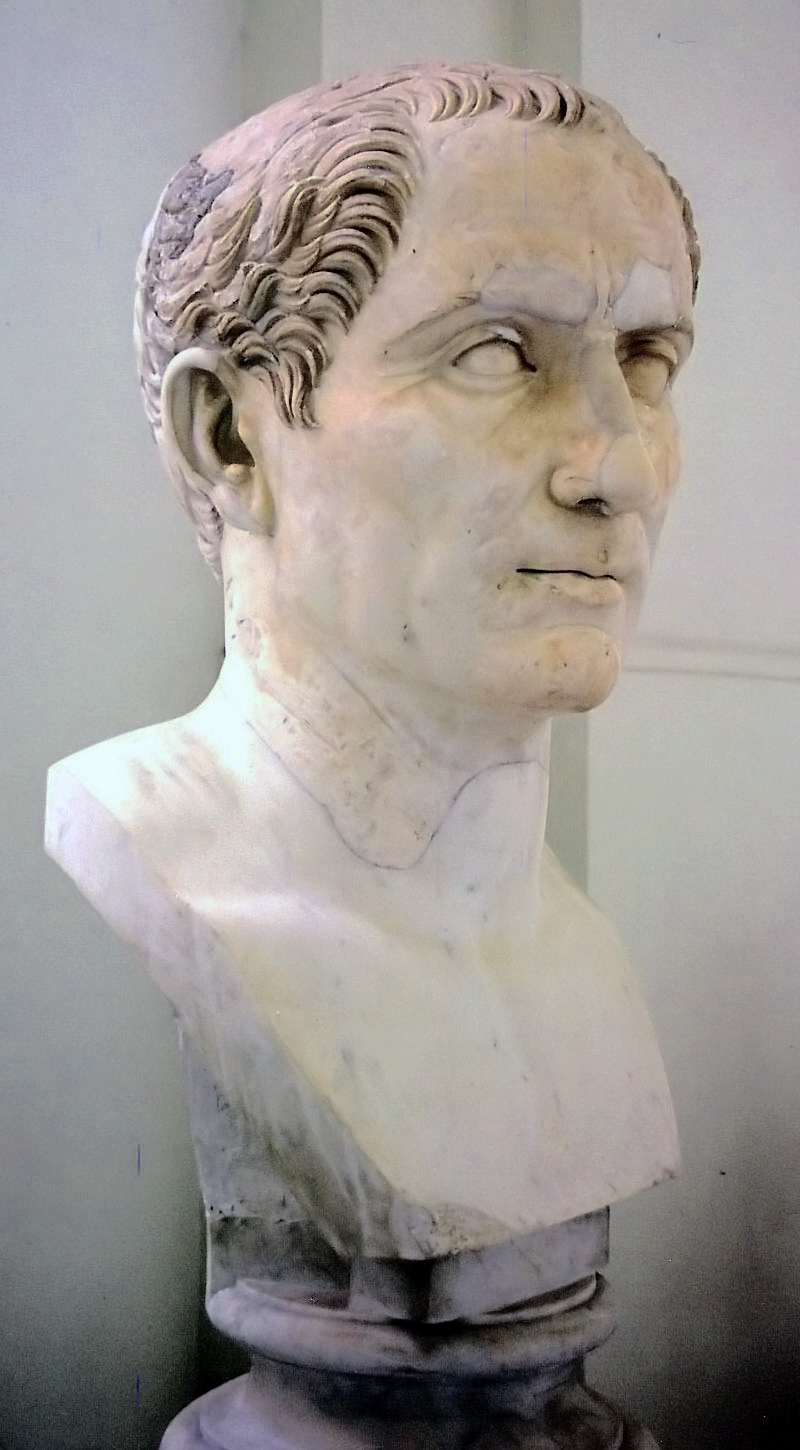
Julius Caesar

The literary histories list includes all authors from Canonical to the Ciceronian Age—even those whose works are fragmented or missing altogether. With the exception of a few major writers, such as Cicero, Caesar, Virgil and Catullus, ancient accounts of Republican literature praise jurists and orators whose writings, and analyses of various styles of language cannot be verified because there are no surviving records. The reputations of Aquilius Gallus, Quintus Hortensius Hortalus, Lucius Licinius Lucullus, and many others who gained notoriety without readable works, are presumed by their association within the Golden Age. A list of canonical authors of the period whose works survived in whole or in part is shown here:

- Marcus Terentius Varro (116–27 BC), highly influential grammarian
- Titus Pomponius Atticus (112/109 – 35/32), publisher and correspondent of Cicero
- Marcus Tullius Cicero (106–43 BC), orator, philosopher, essayist, whose works define golden Latin prose and are used in Latin curricula beyond the elementary level
- Servius Sulpicius Rufus (106–43 BC), jurist, poet
- Decimus Laberius (105–43 BC), writer of mimes
- Marcus Furius Bibaculus (1st century BC), writer of ludicra
- Gaius Julius Caesar (100–44 BC), general, statesman, historian
- Gaius Oppius (1st century BC), secretary to Julius Caesar, probable author under Caesar's name
- Gaius Matius (1st century BC), public figure, correspondent with Cicero
- Cornelius Nepos (100–24 BC), biographer
- Publilius Syrus (1st century BC), writer of mimes and maxims
- Quintus Cornificius (1st century BC), public figure and writer on rhetoric
- Titus Lucretius Carus (Lucretius; 94–50 BC), poet, philosopher
- Publius Nigidius Figulus (98–45 BC), public officer, grammarian
- Aulus Hirtius (90–43 BC), public officer, military historian
- Gaius Helvius Cinna (1st century BC), poet
- Marcus Caelius Rufus (87–48 BC), orator, correspondent with Cicero
- Gaius Sallustius Crispus (86–34 BC), historian
- Marcus Porcius Cato Uticensis (Cato the Younger; 95–46 BC), orator
- Publius Valerius Cato (1st century BC), poet, grammarian
- Gaius Valerius Catullus (Catullus; 84–54 BC), poet
- Gaius Licinius Macer Calvus (82–47 BC), orator, poet

=== Augustan ===
The Golden Age is divided by the assassination of Julius Caesar. In the wars that followed, a generation of Republican literary figures was lost. Cicero and his contemporaries were replaced by a new generation who spent their formative years under the old constructs, and forced to make their mark under the watchful eye of a new emperor. The demand for great orators had ceased, shifting to an emphasis on poetry. Other than the historian Livy, the most remarkable writers of the period were the poets Virgil, Horace, and Ovid. Although Augustus evidenced some toleration to republican sympathizers, he exiled Ovid, and imperial tolerance ended with the continuance of the Julio-Claudian dynasty.

Augustan writers include:

- Publius Vergilius Maro (Virgil, spelled also as Vergil; 70 – 19 BC),
- Quintus Horatius Flaccus (65 – 8 BC), known for lyric poetry and satires
- Sextus Aurelius Propertius (50 – 15 BC), poet
- Albius Tibullus (54–19 BC), elegiac poet
- Publius Ovidius Naso (43 BC – AD 18), poet
- Titus Livius (64 BC – AD 12), historian
- Grattius Faliscus (a contemporary of Ovid), poet
- Marcus Manilius (1st century BC and AD), astrologer, poet
- Gaius Julius Hyginus (64 BC – AD 17), librarian, poet, mythographer
- Marcus Verrius Flaccus (55 BC – AD 20), grammarian, philologist, calendarist
- Marcus Vitruvius Pollio (80–70 BC — after 15 BC), engineer, architect
- Marcus Antistius Labeo (d. AD 10 or 11), jurist, philologist
- Lucius Cestius Pius (1st century BC & AD), Latin educator
- Gnaeus Pompeius Trogus (1st century BC), historian, naturalist
- Marcus Porcius Latro (late 1st century BC – early 1st century AD), rhetorician
- Gaius Valgius Rufus (consul 12 BC), poet

== Authors of the Silver Age ==
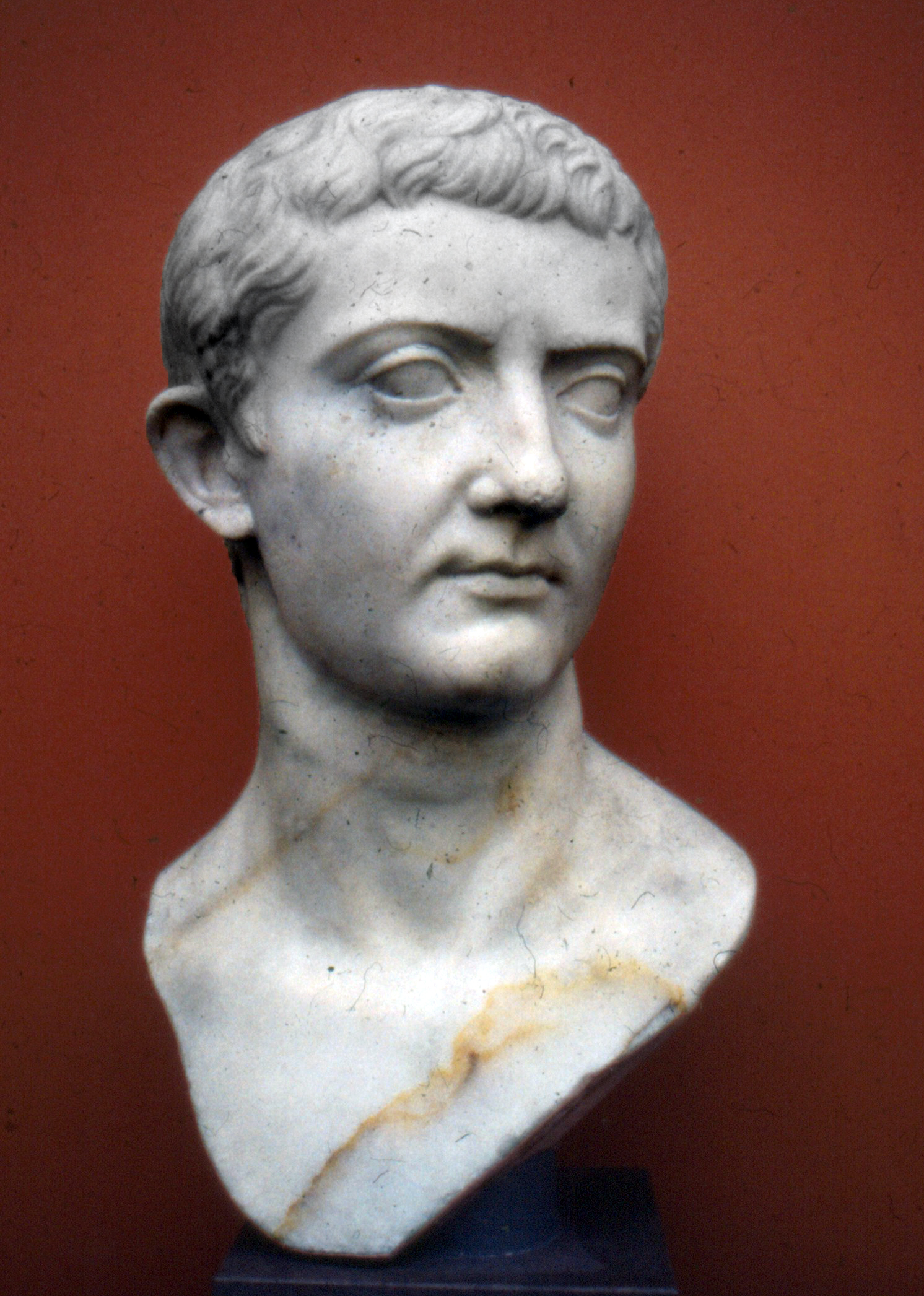
The second emperor, Tiberius, limited free speech, precipitating the rise of Silver Latin, with its emphasis on mannerism rather than on solid content, according to Teuffel's model

In his second volume, Imperial Period, Teuffel initiated a slight alteration in approach, making it clear that his terms applied to Latin and not just to the period. He also changed his dating scheme from AUC to modern BC/AD. Though he introduces das silberne Zeitalter der römischen Literatur (the Silver Age of Roman Literature) from the death of Augustus to the death of Trajan (14–117 AD), he also mentions parts of a work by Seneca the Elder, a wenig Einfluss der silbernen Latinität (a slight influence of silver Latin). It is clear that his mindset had shifted from Golden and Silver Ages to Golden and Silver Latin, also to include Latinitas, which at this point must be interpreted as Classical Latin. He may have been influenced in that regard by one of his sources E. Opitz, who in 1852 had published specimen lexilogiae argenteae latinitatis, which includes Silver Latinity. Though Teuffel's First Period was equivalent to Old Latin and his Second Period was equal to the Golden Age, his Third Period die römische Kaiserheit encompasses both the Silver Age and the centuries now termed Late Latin, in which the forms seemed to break loose from their foundation and float freely. That is, men of literature were confounded about the meaning of "good Latin." The last iteration of Classical Latin is known as Silver Latin. The Silver Age is the first of the Imperial Period, and is divided into die Zeit der julischen Dynastie (14–68); die Zeit der flavischen Dynastie (69–96), and die Zeit des Nerva und Trajan (96–117). Subsequently, Teuffel goes over to a century scheme: 2nd, 3rd, etc., through 6th. His later editions (which came about towards the end of the 19th century) divide the Imperial Age into parts: 1st century (Silver Age), 2nd century (the Hadrian and the Antonines), and the 3rd through 6th centuries. Of the Silver Age proper, Teuffel points out that anything like freedom of speech had vanished with Tiberius:

...the continual apprehension in which men lived caused a restless versatility... Simple or natural composition was considered insipid; the aim of language was to be brilliant... Hence it was dressed up with abundant tinsel of epigrams, rhetorical figures and poetical terms... Mannerism supplanted style, and bombastic pathos took the place of quiet power.

The content of new literary works was continually proscribed by the emperor, who exiled or executed existing authors and played the role of literary man, himself (typically badly). Artists therefore went into a repertory of new and dazzling mannerisms, which Teuffel calls "utter unreality." Cruttwell picks up this theme:

The foremost of these [characteristics] is unreality, arising from the extinction of freedom... Hence arose a declamatory tone, which strove by frigid and almost hysterical exaggeration to make up for the healthy stimulus afforded by daily contact with affairs. The vein of artificial rhetoric, antithesis and epigram... owes its origin to this forced contentment with an uncongenial sphere. With the decay of freedom, taste sank...

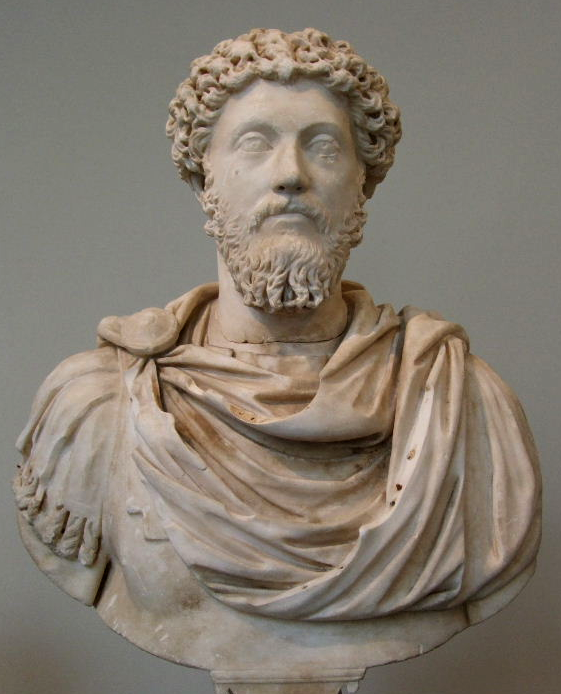
Marcus Aurelius, emperor over the last generation of classicists and himself a classicist.

In Cruttwell's view (which had not been expressed by Teuffel), Silver Latin was a "rank, weed-grown garden," a "decline." Cruttwell had already decried what he saw as a loss of spontaneity in Golden Latin. Teuffel regarded the Silver Age as a loss of natural language, and therefore of spontaneity, implying that it was last seen in the Golden Age. Instead, Tiberius brought about a "sudden collapse of letters." The idea of a decline had been dominant in English society since Edward Gibbon's Decline and Fall of the Roman Empire. Once again, Cruttwell evidences some unease with his stock pronouncements: "The Natural History of Pliny shows how much remained to be done in fields of great interest." The idea of Pliny as a model is not consistent with any sort of decline. Moreover, Pliny did his best work under emperors who were as tolerant as Augustus had been. To include some of the best writings of the Silver Age, Cruttwell extended the period through the death of Marcus Aurelius (180 AD). The philosophic prose of a good emperor was in no way compatible with either Teuffel's view of unnatural language, or Cruttwell's depiction of a decline. Having created these constructs, the two philologists found they could not entirely justify them. Apparently, in the worst implication of their views, there was no such thing as Classical Latin by the ancient definition, and some of the very best writing of any period in world history was deemed stilted, degenerate, unnatural language.

The Silver Age furnishes the only two extant Latin novels: Apuleius's The Golden Ass and Petronius's Satyricon.

Writers of the Silver Age include:

=== From Tiberius to Trajan ===
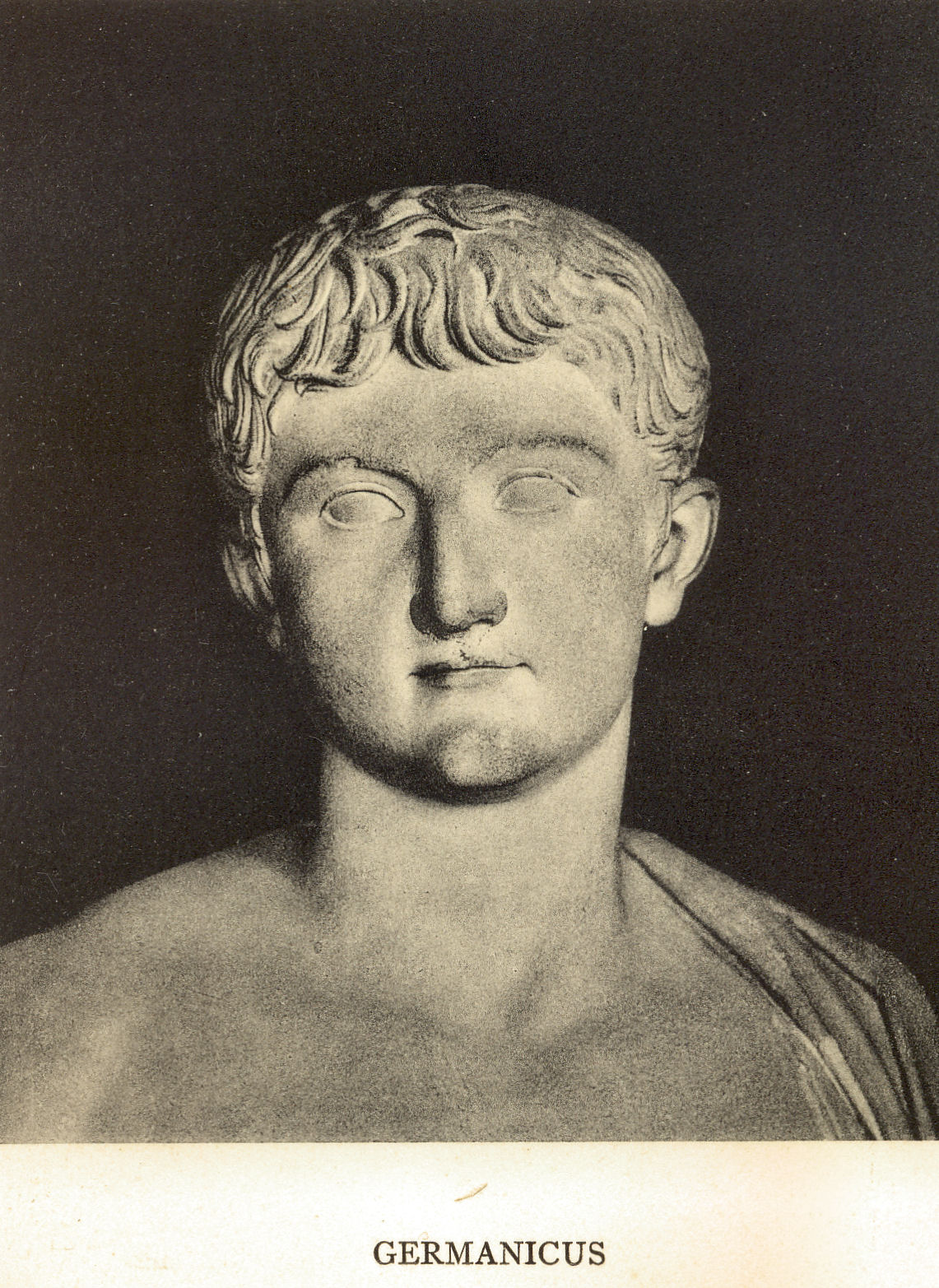
Germanicus Caesar

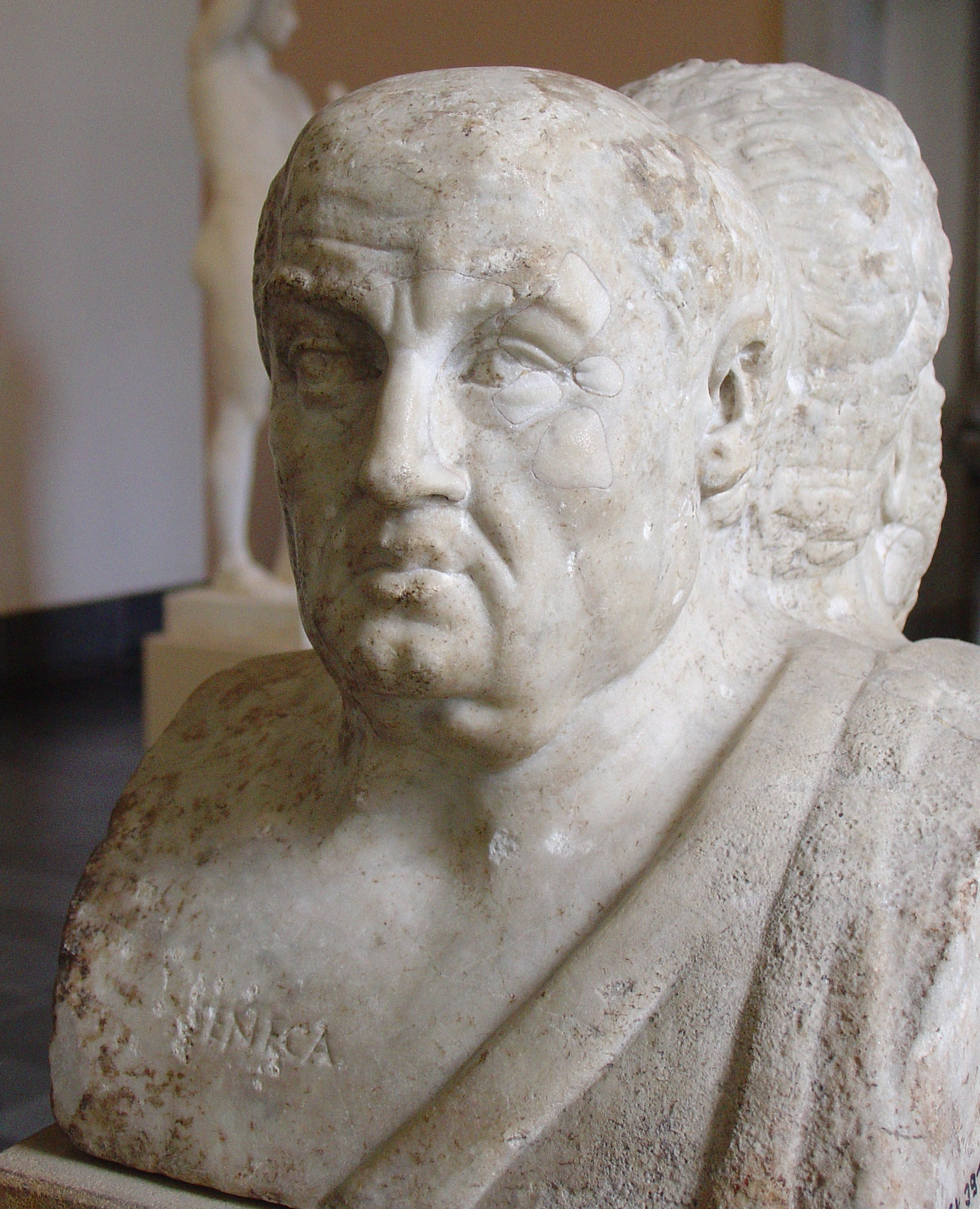
Ancient bust of Seneca, part of a double herm (Antikensammlung Berlin)

- Aulus Cremutius Cordus (died AD 25), historian
- Marcus Velleius Paterculus (19 BC – AD 31), military officer, historian
- Valerius Maximus (20 BC – AD 50), rhetorician
- Masurius Sabinus (1st century AD), jurist
- Phaedrus (15 BC – AD 50), fabulist
- Germanicus Julius Caesar (15 BC – AD 19), royal family, imperial officer, translator
- Aulus Cornelius Celsus (25 BC – AD 50), physician, encyclopedist
- Quintus Curtius Rufus (1st century AD), historian
- Cornelius Bocchus (1st century AD), natural historian
- Pomponius Mela (d. AD 45), geographer
- Lucius Annaeus Seneca (4 BC – AD 65), educator, imperial advisor, philosopher, man of letters
- Gaius Petronius Arbiter (AD 27 – 66), satirist
- Titus Calpurnius Siculus (1st century AD or possibly later), poet
- Marcus Valerius Probus (1st century AD), literary critic
- Tiberius Claudius Caesar Augustus Germanicus (10 BC – AD 54), emperor, man of letters, public officer
- Gaius Suetonius Paulinus (1st century AD), general, natural historian
- Lucius Junius Moderatus Columella (AD 4 – 70), military officer, agriculturalist
- Quintus Asconius Pedianus (9 BC – 76 AD), historian, Latinist
- Gaius Musonius Rufus (AD 20 – 101), stoic philosopher
- Quintus Marcius Barea Soranus (1st century AD), imperial officer and public man
- Gaius Plinius Secundus (AD 23 – 79), imperial officer and encyclopedist
- Gaius Valerius Flaccus (1st century AD), epic poet
- Tiberius Catius Silius Italicus (AD 28 – 103), epic poet
- Gaius Licinius Mucianus (d. AD 76), general, man of letters
- Lucilius Junior (1st century AD), poet
- Aulus Persius Flaccus (34–62 AD), poet and satirist
- Marcus Fabius Quintilianus (35–100 AD), rhetorician
- Sextus Julius Frontinus (AD 40 – 103), engineer, writer
- Marcus Annaeus Lucanus (AD 39 – 65), poet, historian
- Publius Juventius Celsus Titus Aufidius Hoenius Severianus (1st and early 2nd centuries AD), imperial officer, jurist
- Aemilius Asper (1st and 2nd centuries AD), grammarian, literary critic
- Marcus Valerius Martialis (AD 40 – 104), poet, epigrammatist
- Publius Papinius Statius (AD 45 – 96), poet
- Decimus Junius Juvenalis (1st and 2nd centuries AD), poet, satirist
- Publius Annaeus Florus (1st and 2nd centuries AD), poet, rhetorician and probable author of the epitome of Livy
- Velius Longus (1st and 2nd centuries AD), grammarian, literary critic
- Flavius Caper (1st and 2nd centuries AD), grammarian
- Publius or Gaius Cornelius Tacitus (AD 56 − 120), imperial officer, historian and in Teuffel's view "the last classic of Roman literature."
- Gaius Plinius Caecilius Secundus (AD 62 – 114), historian, imperial officer and correspondent

=== Through the death of Marcus Aurelius, 180 AD ===
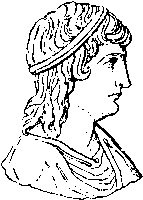
Sketch of Apuleius

Of the additional century granted by Cruttwell to Silver Latin, Teuffel says: "The second century was a happy period for the Roman State, the happiest indeed during the whole Empire... But in the world of letters the lassitude and enervation, which told of Rome's decline, became unmistakeable... its forte is in imitation." Teuffel, however, excepts the jurists; others find other "exceptions", recasting Teuffels's view.

- Gaius Suetonius Tranquillus (70/75 – after 130 AD), biographer
- Marcus Junianus Justinus (2nd century AD), historian
- Lucius Octavius Cornelius Publius Salvius Julianus Aemilianus (AD 110–170), imperial officer, jurist
- Sextus Pomponius (2nd century AD), jurist
- Quintus Terentius Scaurus (2nd century AD), grammarian, literary critic
- Aulus Gellius (AD 125 – after 180), grammarian, polymath
- Lucius Apuleius Platonicus (123/125–180 AD), novelist
- Marcus Cornelius Fronto (AD 100–170), advocate, grammarian
- Gaius Sulpicius Apollinaris (2nd century AD), educator, literary commentator
- Granius Licinianus (2nd century AD), writer
- Lucius Ampelius (2nd century AD), educator
- Gaius (AD 130–180), jurist
- Lucius Volusius Maecianus (2nd century AD), educator, jurist
- Marcus Minucius Felix (d. AD 250), apologist of Christianity, "the first Christian work in Latin" (Teuffel)
- Sextus Julius Africanus (2nd century AD), Christian historian

== Stylistic shifts ==
Style of language refers to repeatable features of speech that are somewhat less general than the fundamental characteristics of a language. The latter provides unity, allowing it to be referred to by a single name. Thus Old Latin, Classical Latin, Vulgar Latin, etc., are not considered different languages, but are all referred to by the term, Latin. This is an ancient practice continued by moderns rather than a philological innovation of recent times. That Latin had case endings is a fundamental feature of the language. Whether a given form of speech prefers to use prepositions such as ad, ex, de, for "to", "from" and "of" rather than simple case endings is a matter of style. Latin has a large number of styles. Each and every author has a style, which typically allows his prose or poetry to be identified by experienced Latinists. Problems in comparative literature have risen out of group styles finding similarity by period, in which case one may speak of Old Latin, Silver Latin, Late Latin as styles or a phase of styles.

The ancient authors themselves first defined style by recognizing different kinds of sermo, or "speech". By valuing Classical Latin as "first class", it was better to write with Latinitas selected by authors who were attuned to literary and upper-class languages of the city as a standardized style. All sermo that differed from it was a different style. Thus, in rhetoric, Cicero was able to define sublime, intermediate, and low styles within Classical Latin. St. Augustine recommended low style for sermons. Style was to be defined by deviation in speech from a standard. Teuffel termed this standard "Golden Latin".

John Edwin Sandys, who was an authority in Latin style for several decades, summarizes the differences between Golden and Silver Latin as follows:

Silver Latin is to be distinguished by:

- "an exaggerated conciseness and point"
- "occasional archaic words and phrases derived from poetry"
- "increase in the number of Greek words in ordinary use" (the Emperor Claudius in Suetonius refers to "both our languages," Latin and Greek)
- "literary reminiscences"
- "The literary use of words from the common dialect" (dictare and dictitare as well as classical dicere, "to say")

== Studies on Latin by ancient Romans ==
Comparing all ancient languages, Latin is one of the most preserved and properly reconstructed languages. One of the principal reasons is that classical authors, as native Latin speakers, consciously documented and studied their own language. Some of the major works regarding the Latin language in the classical era are De lingua latina by Varro, Institutio oratoria by Quintilianus, and Ars grammatica by Donatus, which contribute to our knowledge about the language and the linguistic environment at that time regarding the following aspects:

=== Linguistic features ===
Utilizing ancient Roman texts concerning Latin, one is capable of gaining insights on the phonology of Latin. For example, one of the significant phonological features of classical Latin is that “c” [k] was not yet palatalized, which was reflected in Institutio oratoria by Quintilianus, “As to -k, I think it should not be used in any words… there is the letter -c, which suits itself to all vowels”. There it is also mentioned that the archaïc Greek letter Aeolic digamma, ϝ, representing the /w/ sound, lacked to Latin for words like servus or vulgus. Therefore, in classical Latin, v and u were not distinguished between, both being pronounced as /w/. The letter “i” was applied to both [i] and [j], as reflected by the variant spelling Maiia. Sometimes the vowel length changes the case, short in nominative but long in ablative, sometimes the entire meaning changes (malus). Apart from the vowel length, the accentuation rule was also detailedly explicated in the same book. The Romans used various diacritics, such as the circumflex and acute accent, to denote the accentuation. Despite having a rather phonemic orthography, some derivations still existed in Latin. The name Gaius was sometimes written with “c”, despite pronounced with [g], the “n” in “columna” was omitted due to assimilation, and final obstruents were devoiced while maintaining the spelling (obtinuit).

The Romans have analyzed the grammar of their own Latin so comprehensively, that they were aware of various Latin's grammatical features, such as:

- Singular and plural tantum (scala, hordea)
- Vowel length of infinitives in the 2nd and 3rd declension
- Impersonal verbs (licet, piget)
- Epicene gender (Muroena, Glycerium)
- Instrumental use of the ablative (e.g. hastā percussi)
- Weakened vowels in compound verbs (cadit to excidit)

Most original Latin grammatical terms (e.g. names for grammatical cases) have remained standard academic terms for describing languages. Donatus, in Ars grammatica, defined and exhausted numerous terms as well as provided a comprehensive guide on grammar rules, declensions and conjugations in the manner of question-and-answer, which demonstrates formalized and systemized study on grammar. Throughout Latin's long history, different classifications of words were developed. Varro, in “De lingua latina”, 47-45 BC, classified words both as local, foreign, and obsolete, and as body, place, time, and action, the latter being more proximate to current word classes. On the other hand, by the time of Quintilianus, the modern system was effectively complete, as words were classified as verbs, nouns, articles, prepositions, and nouns were further divided by tangibility.

=== Etymology ===
Despite not having been equipped with modern linguistic knowledge nor the availability of comparative linguistic, ancient Roman grammarians and linguists still attempted to establish the relation between words and explore their origins. Varro preferred deducing the etymology by relating words with other Latin words, i.e. establishing words as derivatives of other local words, e.g. he indicated “humilis” (humble) as a derivative of “humus” (soil), as both have a connotation of “low”. He also attempted to analyze words of cultural importance, such as the god Iuppiter, whom he analyzed as dies pater. However, sometimes this method caused implausible results, such as considering that “solus” (soil) gained its name because the earth can “only” (sola) be trodden. On the contrary, Quintilianus criticized this approach for its counterintuitive result, such as relating the dark “lucus” (grove) with luceo (to shine), or “ludus” (school) with “ludo” (play) as a school is “as far as possible from play”. In fact, he directly criticized Varro for relating “ager” (field) with “agi” (to be done), and “graculus” (jackdaws) with “gregatim” (in flocks). Instead Quintilianus considered these to be a Greek loanword and an onomatopoeïa, respectively. Varro was also criticized for using deliberate misspellings in order to suit his theories.

=== Foreign influences ===
Varro's approach could be explicated by his preference on attributing Latin words to Latin rather than Greek origins. In Roman times, the influence of Greek on Latin was debated. As Greek was the language of philosophy and high culture, educated Romans were fluent in Greek, and its status was so high as to be considered xenophilia; it was custom for children to speak Greek long before learning Latin. Romans admired Greek loanwords more, e.g. using κυρταύχενα while deriding incurvicervicum. The Greek language also influenced Latin's orthography by importing letters such as k and x, as well as diagraphs such as “ei”, as a non-standard spelling of “ī”, which was criticized by Quintilianus. Nonetheless, he advocated that children should learn Greek first, because children would learn Latin eventually anyway and because he considered Latin to be derived from Greek. He did not neglect Latin either, advocating that it be learned shortly after children started learning Greek, because he intended to avoid the contamination of Latin's purity by Greek accent and idioms.

Besides Greek, due to the vast expanse of the Empire, numerous loanwords entered Latin and became imprescindible part of the language, as Gallic words like rheda (chariot) and petorritum (four-wheeled carriage) were used even by Cicero and Horatius.

These loanwords originated from various nations that the Romans contacted, such as:

- Mappa (napkin) from Carthagine
- Gurdus (slang for foolish) from Spain
- Casnar (parasite) from Gallia
- Mastruca (shaggy garment) from Sardinia

These loanwords have become so nativized, that Romans combined different loanwords or loan morphemes to form compound words in Latin, e.g. the Latin word epirhedium was formed from the Greek prefix epi- and the Gallic word rheda.

=== Language changes and descriptivism-prescriptivism debate ===
Owing to the long history of Latin, even Latin in the classical period has already experienced changes compared to pre-classical era. Just like nowadays Latin is used for a symbol of education and high status, Romans considered that archaic Latin had conveyed a sense of authority and majesty, which encouraged them to use obsolete words like "topper" (rapidly) or "antigerio" (very much). Varro mentioned in De lingua latina, “Not every word that has been applied, still exists, because lapse of time has blotted out some. Not every word that is in use, has been applied without inaccuracy of some kind, nor does every word which has been applied correctly remain as it originally was.” He claimed that he could examine the etymology easily as he was able to trace the changes such as the loss and addition of syllables and letters. He gave the example of “hostis” which underwent a semantic shift from “foreigner” to “enemy”. Beside vocabulary, Quintilianus also documented certain phonological changes were also already developed in Classical Latin era, such as:

- Mehe to Me
- Valesii to Valerii
- Mertare to Mersare
- Duellum to Bellum

During the classical period, despite the existence of standardized Latin, variation still existed in orthography. For example, the -unt verb ending for third-person plural was occasionally written as -ont (e.g. probaveront), while “s” was sometimes geminated between long vowels (caussæ, cassus). “Ceruum” was also sometimes written as “ceruom” lest the same letters be confounded in the same sound. In fact, even Varro, a linguist writing a book about the language, used some non-standard spellings in his book. These variations could be both geographical and social, for example, in the countryside “h” was often dropped, while “e” was used for words spelled with “æ” in the city, as reflected in Varro's work.

Various types of “mistakes” were documented by the ancient Romans under the name “barbarism” (orthographical) or “solecism” (grammatical). Donatus defined “barbarism” as “a defective part of speech in common speech” and classified it as letters’, syllables’, tenses’, tones’ and aspirations’ addition, subtraction, immutation, and transmutation, e.g. *abiise(abise), *infantibu(infantibus), *Evandre(Evander), *displicina(disciplina), *salmentum(salsamentum). According to him, “a solecism has words that are inconsistent in themselves, while a barbarism is made in individual words”. Meanwhile, Quintilianus argued that solecism can in reality appear within individual words, supporting himself with examples like saying venite to one person (number disagreement) or answering ‘quem vides” with “ego” (case disagreement), but the word by itself is never faulty of solecism. He divided solecism as addition, e.g. *nam enim; retrenchment, e.g., *ambulo viam instead of ambulo in via; and transposition, e.g. *quoque ego instead of ego quoque.

Other examples of solecism include:

- *hanc virum instead of hunc (gender)
- *Torvumque repente clamat instead of torveque (word class)
- Misuse of prepositions and adverbs, e.g. foris vs foras, intro vs intus

Besides solecism and barbarism, Donatus also mentioned other vices such as tautology, faulty repetition of the same word; eclipse, defect of certain necessary words; cacosyntheton, faulty combination of words; and amphibolia, ambiguity in speech.

It is obvious that as language is constantly changing, debates regarding foreign influence and varieties existed already in Roman times. While some modern prescriptivist may attempt to maintain or revert their language to a more classical era with a “correct” standard, some ancients Romans had been doing the same thing to Latin, one of the languages considered the most classical. The conflict between descriptivism and prescriptivism is not a modern phenomenon, but was already a significant matter of debate in the classical era. The descriptivists were called “anomalists” for supporting anomalies and irregularities based on popular usage, meanwhile the prescriptivists were called “analogists” for deriving the correct grammar rule based on analogy with other word forms. Varro preferred to adopt a middle ground between the two. Quintilianus on one hand said, “Since analogy was not sent down from heaven… but was discovered after men had begun to speak… it is not therefore founded on reason, but on example. Nor is it a law for speaking, but the mere result of observation, so that nothing but custom has been the origin of analogy.” On the other hand, he considered it dangerous to both the language and to life itself, that customs be defined as anything the majority did. Therefore, he also adopted a middle ground, advocating to pursue the agreement only of the educated as the custom of the language.

== See also ==
- Classic
- Classical antiquity
- Classics
- Ecclesiastical Latin
- Late Latin
- Latin
- Latin literature
- Medieval Latin
- Neo-Latin
- Social class in ancient Rome
