= Ofilia gens =

Ancient Roman family

The gens Ofilia, also spelled Ofillia and Ofellia, (Note: Each of these spellings is found in inscriptions, but the ancient historians usually preferred Ofilius.) was a plebeian family at ancient Rome. Its most illustrious member was the jurist Aulus Ofilius, a friend of both Caesar and Cicero.

== Origin ==
The nomen Ofilius first appears in history during the period of the Samnite Wars, both as a praenomen and a nomen among the Samnites, but by the first century BC individuals of this gens are found at Rome. As a nomen, Ofilius may be regarded as a patronymic surname based on the existing praenomen, but Chase suggests a derivation from Ofella, a cognomen formed as a diminutive of offa, "a morsel".

== Members ==
- Ofilius Calavius, a Campanian leader during the Samnite Wars, although in this case Ofilius appears to be his praenomen.
- Aulus Ofilius, (Note: Pomponius appears to call him Gaius Aulus Ofilius, but this seems to be a copyist's error.) an eminent jurist of the first century BC, with whom Caesar, Cicero, and Atticus were well-acquainted. He was a pupil of Servius Sulpicius Rufus, and the tutor of Tubero, Capito, and Labeo.
- Ofillius, a military tribune serving under Octavian at the time of the mutiny of the soldiers in 36 BC. Ofillius rejected Octavian's offers of military honours as a reward for service. He subsequently disappeared.
- Marcus Ofilius Hilarus, an actor whose death was remarked upon by Pliny the Elder. He expired at a birthday dinner, given by himself, so quickly and painlessly that some time elapsed before anyone discovered that he was dead.
- Ofellius, a philosopher mentioned by Arrian.
- Ofilius Macedo, one of the quindecimviri sacris faciundis in AD 204.
- Aulus Ofellius Macedo, a military tribune in the first legion, who subsequently became governor of Epirus, then of Bithynia and Pontus.
- Ofillius Maximus, patronus municipii of Terventum in Samnium.

== See also ==
- List of Roman gentes

== Bibliography ==
- Marcus Tullius Cicero, Epistulae ad Atticum, Epistulae ad Familiares.
- Titus Livius (Livy), History of Rome.
- Gaius Plinius Secundus (Pliny the Elder), Naturalis Historia (Natural History).
- Lucius Flavius Arrianus (Arrian of Nicomedia), Epicteti Diatribae (Discourses of Epictetus).
- Appianus Alexandrinus (Appian), Bellum Civile (The Civil War).
- Digesta seu Pandectae (The Digest).
- Guilielmus Grotius, De Vitae Jurisconsultorum (Lives of the Jurists), Felix Lopez, Lugdunum Batavorum (1690).
- Sigmund Wilhelm Zimmern, Geschichte des Römischen Privatrechts bis Justinian (History of Roman Private Law to Justinian), J. C. B. Mohr, Heidelberg (1826).
- Georg Friedrich Puchta, Cursus der Institutionen (Course of the Institutions), Breitkopf und Härtel, Leipzig (1841–1847).
- Dictionary of Greek and Roman Biography and Mythology, William Smith, ed., Little, Brown and Company, Boston (1849).
- Theodor Mommsen et alii, Corpus Inscriptionum Latinarum (The Body of Latin Inscriptions, abbreviated CIL), Berlin-Brandenburgische Akademie der Wissenschaften (1853–present).
- George Davis Chase, "The Origin of Roman Praenomina", in Harvard Studies in Classical Philology, vol. VIII (1897).
- Paul von Rohden, Elimar Klebs, & Hermann Dessau, Prosopographia Imperii Romani (The Prosopography of the Roman Empire, abbreviated PIR), Berlin (1898).
- T. Robert S. Broughton, The Magistrates of the Roman Republic, American Philological Association (1952).
