= Titius Aristo =

2nd century Roman jurist

Titius Aristo (sometimes, incorrectly, Titus Aristo) was a distinguished jurist of ancient Rome, who lived around the 1st and 2nd centuries CE, under the emperor Trajan, and was a friend of Pliny the Younger. He is spoken of by Pliny in terms of the highest praise, as not only an excellent man and profound scholar, but a lawyer thoroughly acquainted with private and public law, and perfectly skilled in the practice of his profession.

== Works ==
Pliny does not say anything about Aristo's merits as an author, and though his works are occasionally mentioned in the compendium of juristic writings known as the Digest, there is no direct extract from any of them in that compilation.

In philosophy, this model of a virtuous lawyer is described by Pliny as a genuine disciple of the Stoa Poikile. He has been usually supposed to belong to the legal sect of the Proculeian school, which clashed with the rival sect of the Sabinian school, though there is at least one situation described in which his legal opinions sided with the Sabinian Javolenus instead of the Proculeian Pegasus.

Aristo wrote notes on the Libri Posteriorum of Marcus Antistius Labeo, on "Cassius" (unclear which one, but likely Gaius Cassius Longinus or a descendant), whose pupil he had been, and on Masurius Sabinus. "Aristo in decretis Frontianis", or "Frontinianis", is once cited in the Digest; but what those decreta ("decisions") were has never been satisfactorily explained.

He corresponded with his contemporary jurists, Publius Juventius Celsus and Lucius Neratius Priscus; and it appears probable that many of the responsa and epistolae of the Roman jurisconsults were not opinions upon cases occurring in actual practice, but answers to the hypothetical questions of pupils and legal friends.

== Other Possible Works ==
Other works have been attributed to him without strong consensus among modern scholars. Some, for example, have inferred from a passage in Aulus Gellius, that he wrote de furtis; and, from passages in the Digest, that he published books titled Digesta and Responsa.
