= Trebatius Testa =

Roman jurist

Gaius Trebatius Testa (c. 84 BC – ?) was a jurist of ancient Rome, whose family, and himself, originated from Elea.

== Friendship with Cicero and the Caesars ==
Some twenty years younger than Cicero, Trebatius was both a familiar friend and a protégé of the latter. Cicero dedicated his Topica to Trebatius, and recommended Trebatius as a legal advisor to Julius Caesar, calling him a thorough gentleman and a "leading light in civil law". Trebatius enjoyed Caesar's favor, making his fortune alongside him in Gaul, and supporting him in the Civil War.

Later he also worked closely with Augustus, and was subsequently described in the Institutes of Justinian as being of the greatest authority for Augustan law.

== Character ==
A good-humoured man - Cicero wrote of sending him "badinage in your own style" - Trebatius was featured by Horace as a learned adviser in his Satires. As well as a fondness for wine, Trebatius also seemed to enjoy swimming as a hobby.

== Legal career and influence ==
A pupil of Cornelius Maximus, Trebatius played a key part in the transfer of legal authority from the senate to individual jurisconsults under the Principate.

An expert on sacral law, Trebatius' writings included a de religionibus and de iure civili, but not even excerpts of these survive. He was, however, frequently cited by later jurists, and also had a high reputation as the teacher of Marcus Antistius Labeo.

== See also ==
- Aulus Ofilius
- Gaius Matius - friend of Cicero/Trebatius
- Servius Sulpicius Rufus - legal rival
