= Proculeian school =

Ancient Roman school of law

The Proculeian or Pegasian school was one of the two most important schools of law in ancient Rome during the 1st and 2nd centuries.

== Origin ==
The Proculeians originally took their name from the prominent jurist Proculus, but later came to often be called "Pegasians" after the prominent Proculeian Plotius Pegasus. However, the tradition on which the school was based comes from the jurist Marcus Antistius Labeo. Labeo spent half the year convening sessions at actual schools with regular students, who then carried forth his views and perspectives on the law.

They were often contrasted with the Sabinian school, a rival school operating in roughly the same time and place, and were (very generally) considered the more progressive of the two, while the Sabinians were seen as more advocates of legal conservatism. Proculeians were thought to "push a legal principle to all its logical consequences," and the legal tradition they inherited from Labeo was one of liberalism influenced by a keen understanding of the science of the day. The Proculeians tried to enlarge the scope of Roman law, and tried to push legal innovations into practice such as were suggested by their liberal philosophy and the principles of reason.

The progressive and conservative natures of the schools increased over time, and there came to be wider chasms between the two, which is perhaps why the schools came to be named after later prominent disciples and students, and not after their originators (the Proculeian school being named after Proculus but originated by Labeo, and the Sabinian school being named after Masurius Sabinus but originated by Gaius Ateius Capito).

== Positions ==
The Roman legal compendium known as Digest records many decisions in which the Proculeians advocated. Among these were:

- Fixing the legal age of puberty (decided in favor of the Proculeians)
- Deciding the validity of an appointment of an heir in a will in which the son had been omitted (decided in favor of the Sabinians)
- Deciding the validity of a will in which the will writer made inheritance conditional upon an impossible condition (decided in favor of the Sabinians)
- Deciding the legal effect on slaves that are jointly owned when one of the owners grants the slave their freedom (decided in favor of the Sabinians)

== End of the school ==
The rivalry with the Sabinians ended in the 2nd century CE when the two schools either merged or disappeared, or were united under the 3rd century's leading legal mind, Papinian.

== Notable Proculeians ==
- Marcus Antistius Labeo
- Marcus Cocceius Nerva (jurist)
- Marcus Cocceius Nerva (emperor's father)
- Publius Juventius Celsus
- Lucius Neratius Priscus
- Proculus (jurist)
- Plotius Pegasus
- Titus Aristo
