= Cinna (play) =

1641 tragedy by Pierre Corneille

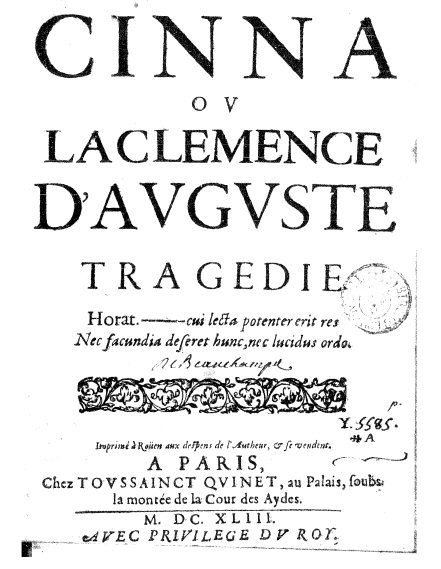
- Title page from 1643 edition of Cinna
- Original language: French
- Written by: Pierre Corneille
- Characters: Cinna; Maxime; Augustus; Emilie; Fulvie; Livie; Polyclète; Évandre; Euphorbe
- Genre: historical drama
- Setting: Rome

Premiere
- Date: 1641
- Place: Théâtre du Marais

Cinna ou la Clémence d'Auguste (English: Cinna or the clemency of Caesar Augustus) is a tragedy by Pierre Corneille written for the Théâtre du Marais in 1641, and published two years later. It takes place in ancient Rome, but the ideas and themes characterize the age of Louis XIV, most notably the establishment of royal power over the nobility. A production was laid on in Bayonne in 1660 just before the King arrived for his wedding to the Infanta.

Corneille addresses the question of clemency and advocates an end to spiraling vengeance. His response is apologetic towards absolute power. As in many of his plays, the heroine is noted for her high tone.

== Plot summary ==
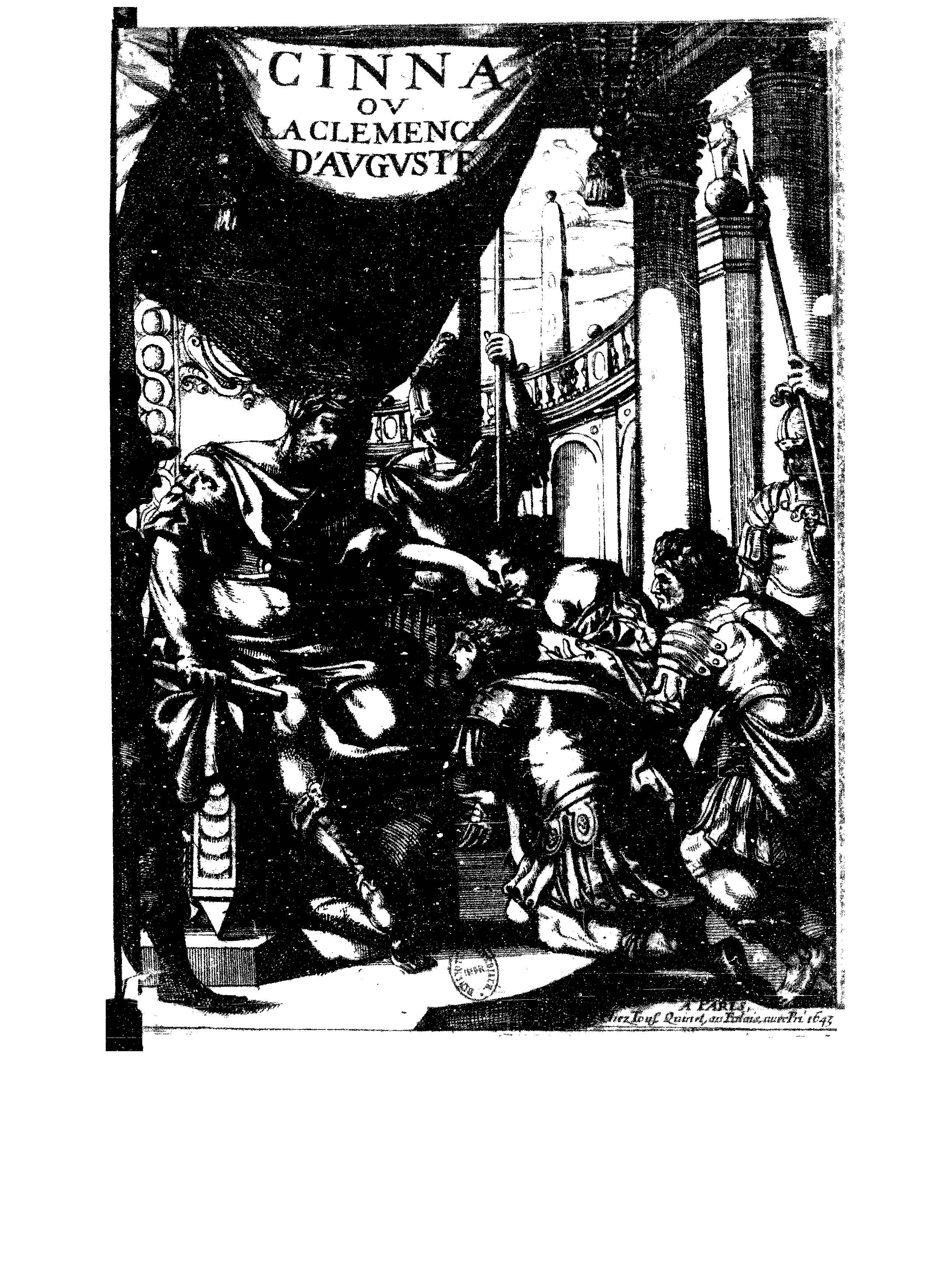
Augustus granting clemency

Act 1 - Emperor Augustus has executed Toranius, the father of young Emilie whom he considers nonetheless like a daughter. Emilie, in love with Cinna, asks him to save her honor by killing Augustus. In exchange, she will marry Cinna. With the help of his friend, Maxime, Cinna plots to kill the emperor.

Act 2 - Augustus, tired of ruling the Roman Empire, seeks the advice of his friends Maxime and Cinna. Should he renounce his rule? Because he desires the love of Emilie, Cinna advises Augustus to keep his throne so he can go forward with his assassination plot. Augustus thanks the two men by offering them important government posts and land, and he even offers Emilie to Cinna as wife.

Act 3 - Meanwhile, Maxime is also in love with Emilie, and when Cinna reveals his true reason for advising Augustus to stay on the throne, Maxime is overcome with jealousy. Maxime's servant, Euphorbe, suggests that Maxime betray Cinna and go to Caesar with the assassination plot so that he may receive Emilie in marriage; however, Maxime does not listen. Cinna is faced with a dilemma: the probity and generosity of Augustus has caused him to question his devotion to Emilie. He nonetheless decides to go through with the assassination attempt to please his lover.

Act 4 - Euphorbe, claiming to be sent by Maxime, goes to Augustus to reveal everything. Caesar's wife, Livie, tells him to pardon Cinna in order to gain glory and respect, but Augustus is apparently deaf to these arguments and calls Cinna before him. Maxime goes to find Emilie to declare his love, but Emilie pushes him away and accuses him of betraying Cinna.

Act 5 - Emilie finds Cinna before Augustus. She declares her guilt and tries to clear Cinna's name by saying that she seduced him to do her will. Cinna tries to protect Emilie by declaring her story to be false. Finally, Maxime enters and declares that he and Euphorbe had made the entire story up. Faced with those he holds dear, Augustus decides to pardon them all. He proposes that his enemies take the government positions and lands that he offered them prior to the scandal, and they all accept and thank him graciously.

== Characters ==
The Emperor Augustus Rebuking Cornelius Cinna for His Treachery by Étienne-Jean Delécluze, 1814

- Octave - César Auguste (Augustus Caesar)
- Livie
- Cinna
- Maxime
- Émilie
- Fulvie
- Polyclète
- Évandre
- Euphorbe

== Other project ==
- (in French) Full text at Wikisource
