= Ateia gens =

Pebeian family at ancient Rome

The gens Ateia was a plebeian family at Rome. The gens does not appear to have been particularly large or important, and is known from a small number of individuals, of whom the most illustrious was the jurist Gaius Ateius Capito, consul in AD 5.

== Praenomina ==
The only praenomina associated with the Ateii mentioned by Roman writers are Lucius, Gaius, and Marcus, the three most common names at all periods of Roman history.

== Members ==
This list includes abbreviated praenomina. For an explanation of this practice, see filiation.

- Marcus Ateius, the first soldier to climb the walls of Athens during the siege of that city by Sulla in 86 BC.
- Gaius Ateius Capito, tribune of the plebs in 55 BC, famous for announcing terrible omens upon the departure of Crassus for Syria. He was praetor in an uncertain year, and may be the same Capito whom Appian describes as a legate of Antony.
- Lucius Ateius Capito, quaestor by 52 BC, was subsequently praetor, also in an uncertain year. He may be the father or grandfather of Gaius Ateius Capito, the jurist.
- Lucius Ateius Praetextatus, surnamed Philologus, a notable grammarian of the first century BC.
- Gaius Ateius L. f. L. n. Capito, (Note: This filiation from the Fasti Capitolini. Historians have traditionally supposed him to be the son of Gaius Ateius Capito, tribune of the plebs in 55 BC.) one of the most distinguished jurists of the early Empire, and consul suffectus in AD 5.
- Marcus Ateius, a man of praetorian rank, was sent to Asia by Tiberius to assess damage from the earthquake of AD 17.
- Ateius Sanctus, a misreading of Titus Aius Sanctus, the orator and a teacher of the emperor Commodus.

== See also ==
- List of Roman gentes
- Aetia gens

== Bibliography ==
- Marcus Tullius Cicero, De Divinatione; Epistulae ad Familiares.
- Publius Cornelius Tacitus, Annales.
- Lucius Mestrius Plutarchus (Plutarch), Lives of the Noble Greeks and Romans (Parallel Lives).
- Appianus Alexandrinus (Appian), Bellum Civile (The Civil War).
- Lucius Cassius Dio, Roman History.
- Dictionary of Greek and Roman Biography and Mythology, William Smith, ed., Little, Brown and Company, Boston (1849).
- T. Robert S. Broughton, The Magistrates of the Roman Republic, American Philological Association (1952–1986).
- Anthony R. Birley, Marcus Aurelius, Routledge (1966, 1987); Lives of the Later Caesars, Penguin (1976).
- E. L. Bowie, "The Importance of Sophists", in Later Greek Literature Cambridge University Press (1982).
- Tim Cornell (editor), The Fragments of the Roman Historians, Oxford University Press (2013).
