= Atilicinus =

Ancient Roman jurist

Atilicinus was a renowned jurist of ancient Rome, who probably lived about the middle of the first century CE.

He seems to have been attached to the sect of Proculus, to whom he addressed a letter, which is contained in the Digest of Justinian I, in an extract from Proculus himself. He is several times referred to in the Digest, and is also cited in the Institutes of Gaius as an authority on, among other things, bankruptcy law and concubinage and adultery law.

However, there is no direct extract from him, and the names of his works have not been preserved, though the historian Johann August Bach seems to infer from the Digest that he published responsa.

Opinions of his are quoted by several later Roman jurists, such as Fufidius and Aufidius Chius.
