= Lucius Ateius Praetextatus =

Lucius Ateius Praetextatus (surnamed "Philologus"—Φιλόλογος), (died c. 29 BC) was a Roman freedman, rhetorician, and grammarian.

Ateius Praetextatus was born in Athens. He was brought to Rome as a prisoner by Marcus Ateius following the sack of Athens in 86 BC. He tutored members of the nobility such as the brothers Appius Claudius Pulcher and Publius Clodius Pulcher, and later accompanied the former to Asia and Cilicia around the 50s BC.

He wrote that he was a pupil of Marcus Antonius Gnipho, He gave himself the epithet "philologus" (lover of words), "because like Eratosthenes, who was first to lay claim to that surname, he regarded himself as a man of wide and varied learning." The jurist Gaius Ateius Capito called him “a rhetorician among grammarians and a grammarian among rhetoricians.”

He was a friend and collaborator with Sallust, and then Gaius Asinius Pollio. He provided Sallust with an epitome (breviarium rerum omnnium Romanarum) from which he could choose material for his history, and Asinius Pollio with rules for writing (praeceptis de ratione scribendi). He fit the modern usage of "philologist" with his research for Sallust into archaic terms. Asinius Pollio writes that Sallust made excessive use of archaisms "abetted in this by a certain Ateius, when I was a boy a Latin grammarian and later a critic and teacher of declamation, in short a self-styled ‘Philologus.’”

== Works ==
All of Ateius Praetextatus' work has been lost, except for brief quotations in later authors.

- breviarium rerum omnnium Romanarum, previously mentioned
- A collection of archaic words and figures for Asinius Pollio
- Hylae, his principal work consisting of "material of every kind"
- liber glossematorum
- an amaverit Dido Aeneas (whether Aeneas loved Dido)
