= Gnaeus Cornelius Cinna Magnus =

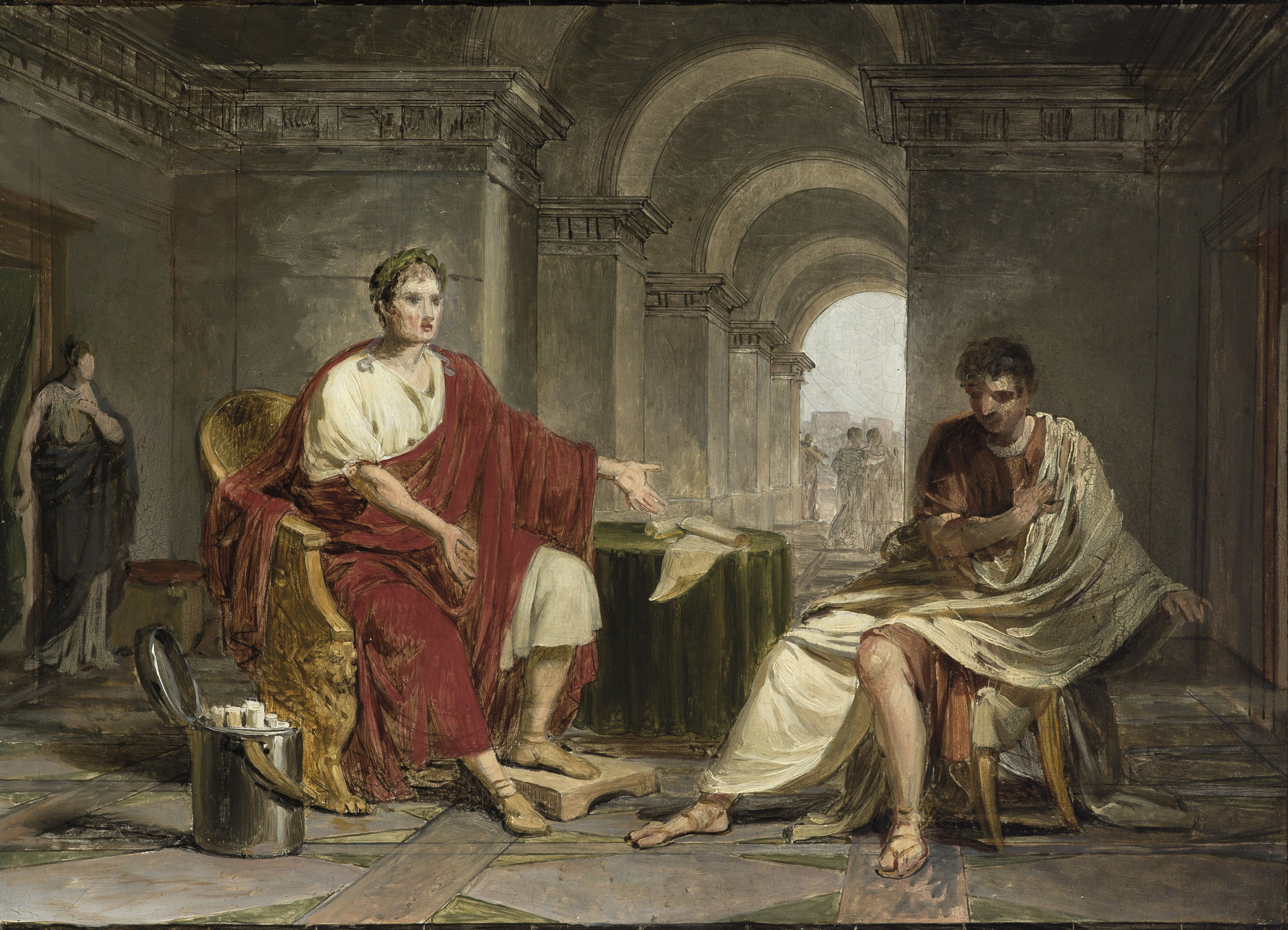
Cinna (right) conversing with Augustus (left)

Gnaeus Cornelius Cinna Magnus (born between 47 BC and 35 BC) was an ancient Roman politician and the son of suffect consul Lucius Cornelius Cinna and Pompeia Magna. His sister was Magna.

His maternal grandparents were triumvir Pompey and Mucia Tertia, while his paternal grandparents were consul Lucius Cornelius Cinna and an unnamed Roman woman. Cinna is the only grandson of Pompey who has the name ‘Magnus’, or, indeed, any part of his name.

The Emperor Augustus Rebuking Cornelius Cinna for His Treachery by Étienne-Jean Delécluze, 1814

Cinna became a supporter to triumvir Mark Antony. He was promoted to a priesthood. In 16 BC, Cinna and Aemilia Lepida, the granddaughter of triumvir Marcus Aemilius Lepidus, were involved in a conspiracy against the Emperor Augustus. Cinna and Lepida were the first and last people pardoned by the emperor after having conspired against him. Indeed, this was famously the last documented conspiracy against Augustus. Cinna served as a consul in 5 AD and is said to have been a close friend and adviser to Augustus until his death.

Cinna is the main character of a tragedy called Cinna by the famous 17th-century French playwright Corneille.

Political offices
Preceded by Cn. Sentius Saturninus; Gaius Clodius Licinus as suffecti	Roman consul AD 5 with L. Valerius Messalla Volesus	Succeeded by C. Vibius Postumus; C. Ateius Capito as suffecti
