= Gaius Julius Solinus =

3rd century Roman geographer and grammarian

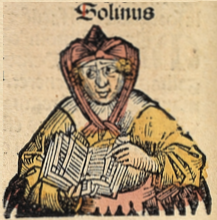
Solinus (Nuremberg Chronicle)

Gaius Julius Solinus, better known simply as Solinus, was a Latin grammarian, geographer, and compiler who probably flourished in the early 3rd century AD. Historical scholar Theodor Mommsen dates him to the middle of the 3rd century.

== Works ==
Solinus was the author of De mirabilibus mundi ("On the Wonders of the World") which circulated under the titles Collectanea Rerum Memorabilium ("A Collection of Curious Things"), Mirabilia, and Polyhistor, the latter title being favoured by the author himself. The work is indeed a description of curiosities in a chorographic framework. Adventus, to whom it is dedicated, is identified with Oclatinius Adventus, Roman consul in AD 218. It contains a short description of the ancient world, with remarks on historical, social, religious, and natural history questions. The greater part is taken from Pliny's Natural History and the geography of Pomponius Mela.

According to Mommsen, Solinus also relied upon a chronicle (possibly by Cornelius Bocchus) and a chorographia Pliniana, an epitome of Pliny's work with additions made about the time of Hadrian. Schanz, however, suggests the Roma and Prata of Suetonius.

A greatly revised version of his original text was made, perhaps by Solinus himself. This version contains a letter that Solinus wrote as an introduction to the work, which gives the work the title Polyhistor. Both versions of the work circulated widely and eventually Polyhistor was taken for the author's name. It was popular in the Middle Ages, hexameter abridgments being current under the names of Theodericus and Petrus Diaconus.

The commentary by Saumaise in his Plinianae Exercitationes (1689) was considered indispensable; the 1895 edition by Mommsen includes a valuable introduction on the manuscripts, the authorities used by Solinus, and subsequent compilers. See also Teuffel, History of Roman Literature (English translation, 1900), 389; and Schanz, Geschichte der Römischen Litteratur (1904), iv. I. There is an early modern English translation by Arthur Golding (1587) and a modern one with commentary by Dr. Arwen Apps of Macquarie University.

== Editions ==
- Kai Brodersen, Solinus: Wunder der Welt. Collectanea Rerum Mirabilium. Lateinisch und Deutsch. Edition Antike. Darmstadt: Wiss. Buchgesellschaft 2014. ISBN 978-3-534-18162-9
- Arwen Elizabeth Apps, Gaius Iulius Solinus and His Polyhistor, Macquarie University, 2011 (PhD Dissertation)
