= Lucius Arruntius (consul 6) =

Roman senator, consul and governor (died 37)

- Born: Before 27 BC
- Died: 37 AD
- Cause of death: Suicide by opening of veins
- Citizenship: Roman
- Occupation: Senator
- Years active: 6 AD – 37 AD
- Organization: Senate of Rome
- Known for: being a respected and wealthy Roman senator
- Term: 6 AD – 37 AD
- Opponents: Sejanus; Macro
- Criminal charges: adultery, maiestas, irreverence towards the emperor (not convicted)
- Children: Lucius Arruntius Camillus Scribonianus (adopted)
- Parent: Lucius Arruntius

Lucius Arruntius (before 27 BC – 37 AD) was a Roman senator praised by the ancient Roman historian Tacitus. He lived throughout most of the reigns of the two first Roman emperors, Augustus and Tiberius. In 6 AD he was appointed consul, and then governor of Hispania Tarraconensis around 25 AD, which he governed in absentia for over 10 years. Throughout the latter part of his life he was plagued by hostility from the Praetorian Guard prefects, Sejanus and Macro, which culminated in his suicide in 37 AD after being arraigned on a trumped-up charge of irreverence to the then-emperor Tiberius.

== Early life and family ==
Lucius Arruntius descended from an ancient and noble family and was the son of Lucius Arruntius, a Roman admiral noteworthy for his participation during the Battle of Actium, where he was in command of Augustus' central fleet. Little else is known of the life of Lucius Arruntius before his consulship in 6 AD.

Arruntius had an adopted son, Lucius Arruntius Camillus Scribonianus who was appointed governor of Dalmatia in about 40 AD and attempted to revolt against Claudius in 41 AD. This suggests that Arruntius may have nurtured revolutionary ideas in his son. He also had an adopted grandson called Lucius Arruntius Camillus Scribonianus who was apparently more proud of his descent from Pompey The Great than that of Arruntius.

== Character ==
Arruntius was one of the most highly respected members of the senate of his day, much admired for his learning and integrity. He is further described as "a man of stainless virtues", "rich", "daring", and having "brilliant accomplishments, and corresponding popularity". Arruntius was a man who was not disposed to sycophancy. In his last conversations with Tiberius, the Roman emperor Augustus described Arruntius as "not unworthy of (ruling) the Empire and would have boldness enough to seize it should the opportunity arise".

== The accession of Tiberius (14 AD) ==
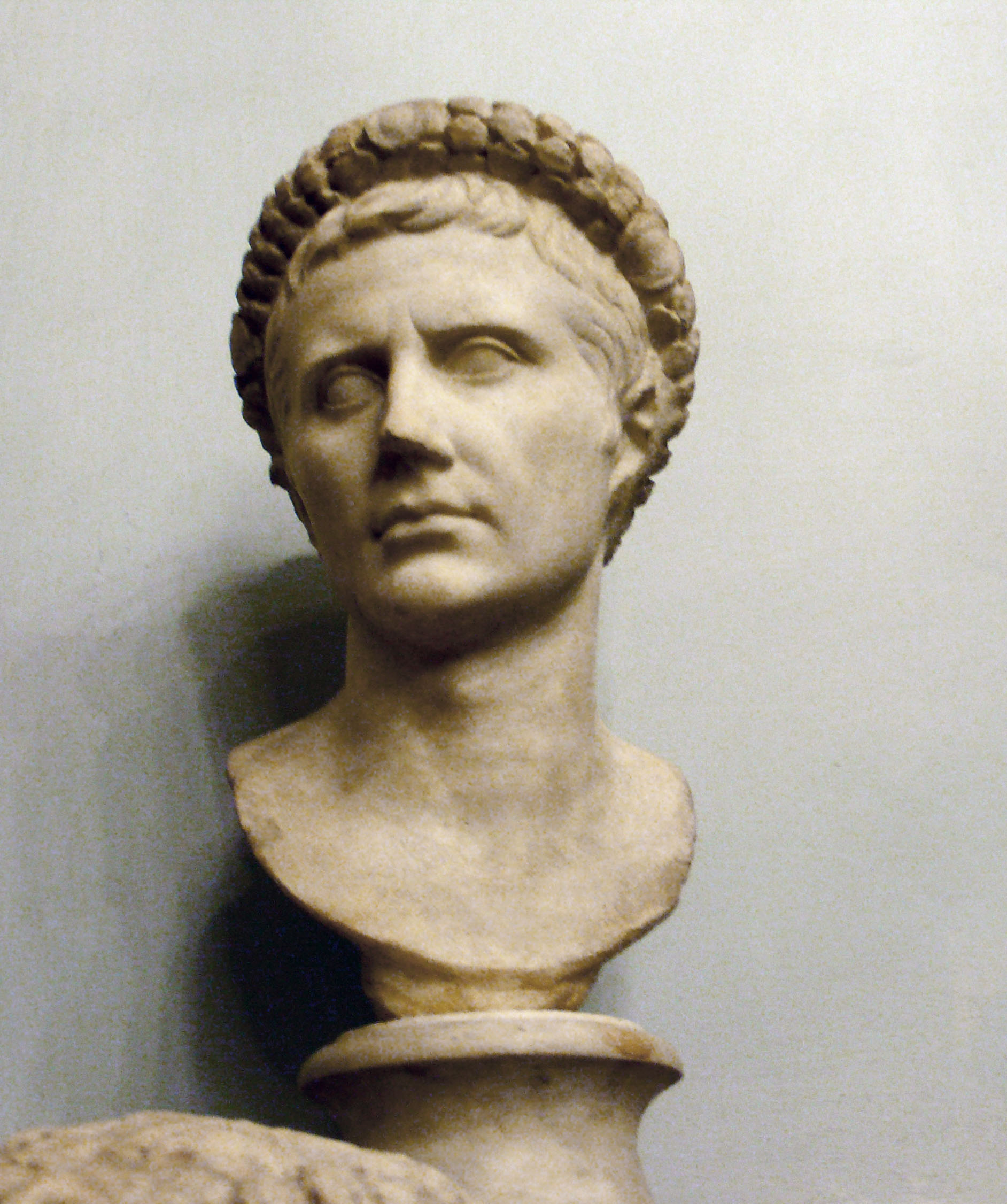
Augustus Caesar

On the first day the senate was convened after the death of Augustus (19 August, 14 AD) the details of his funeral were discussed. On the motion of Arruntius it was decreed that the titles of the laws passed and the names of the nations conquered by Augustus were to be borne in the front of the funeral procession.

The accession of Tiberius was a very delicate matter; maintaining Augustus' equilibrium between Republican traditions and imperial realities was never going to be an easy task. Tiberius was Augustus' step-son and Livia's natural son by a former marriage. During the reign of Augustus Roman power was at its height. Augustus had brought a period of stability and peace following a period of bloody civil wars and revolutions that had resulted in a radical change in the form of government of Rome. The sovereignty of the Roman world was now effectively in the hands of one man (instead of the senate), although the illusion of the Roman Republic was still preserved. Augustus never had a son, and other possible candidates for heir to the throne, such as Marcellus, Gaius Caesar and Lucius Caesar, had died young. This left Tiberius the sole heir of Augustus. It has been suggested that Tiberius' mother Livia may have orchestrated his accession. Tiberius however, wanted to be seen as having been called on to accede to the throne rather than having crept or schemed his way to it. Consequently, he adopted a posture of hesitation, dissimulation and reluctance (though in secret he had already sent letters to the various Roman armies as if supreme power was already his).

During senatorial discussions Tiberius let slip the remark that he would accept a share of responsibility of the Empire but not the whole. In response Asinius Gallus and Arruntius gave speeches asking Tiberius which share of the responsibility of empire he wished so as convince him by his own admission that the body of the state must be directed by a single mind. Tiberius may have felt that these speeches were intended to embarrass him and that the senators had seen through his pretence. This situation may have aroused anger and resentment in Tiberius, and consequently the enmity of Sejanus, the prefect of the Praetorian Guard, towards Gallus and Arruntius.

== Life as a senator in the reign of Tiberius ==
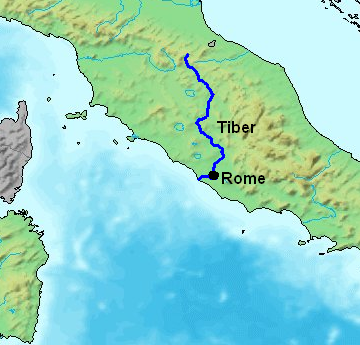
Map showing the course of the Tiber river

During the reign of Tiberius, Arruntius served in the senate as a de facto opposition leader, inasmuch as opposition was permitted. In 15 AD the river Tiber flooded in Rome. The senate appointed Arruntius as well as the great jurist Ateius Capito to a committee of two to devise a means of better confining the river. The question was subsequently put to the senate as to whether some of the tributaries of the Tiber could be diverted in order to mitigate the effects of flood. Several entreaties from neighbouring colonies (Florentia, Reate and Interamna) were heard who begged that such work not be undertaken as it would render their lands flood prone. Mention was made of sacred rites, groves and altars which, they argued, should be taken into account and respected. In the end it was decided not to make any change to the watercourses, due to "either the entreaties of the colonies, the difficulty of the work or superstitious motives". Tiberius must have wanted the problem addressed as he instituted a new commission of five senators whose chairman was probably Arruntius. The appointment of Arruntius to this committee may have been an effort on Tiberius' part to win his support.

In 20 AD Gnaeus Calpurnius Piso sought the advocacy of Arruntius during his trial for the murder of Germanicus. Arruntius declined, presumably due to the public outrage against Piso at the time. The next year he defended Lucius Cornelius Sulla Felix against Domitius Corbulo in their quarrel. In 25 AD Lucius Calpurnius Piso, governor of Hispania Tarraconensis, was assassinated by a native. Tiberius appointed Arruntius as governor of the province in his place. However, Tiberius, not trusting him, only permitted him to govern the province in absentia and obliged him to remain at Rome.

== Conflict with Sejanus ==
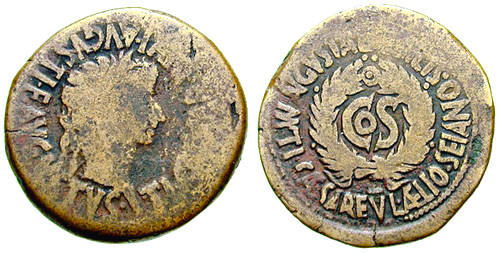
Roman As depicting Tiberius, struck in 31, Augusta Bilbilis. The reverse reads Augusta Bilbilis Ti(berius) Caesare L(ucius) Aelio Seiano, marking the consulship of Sejanus in that year.

Between the years 14 AD and 31 AD Sejanus held the title of the prefect of the Praetorian Guard, a position of much power and influence during the period of the principate. Initially, under Augustus the Praetorian Guard was a kind of imperial bodyguard. Under Sejanus, however, it evolved into a powerful and influential branch of the government involved in public security, civil administration, and ultimately political intercession—changes which would have a lasting impact on the course of the Principate. Sejanus was an ambitious man and desired to be emperor, consequently he saw Arruntius as an obstacle to be eliminated. In 31 AD Sejanus concocted a charge of maiestas (treason) against Arruntius which was prosecuted by Sejanus' henchmen Aruseius and Sanquinius. Perhaps at the prompting of Antonia, Tiberius finally saw through the schemes of Sejanus and had the charges quashed, the accusers punished, and Sejanus executed. Arruntius had his revenge against his great enemy by being the passive instrument which indirectly brought about Sejanus' fall.

== Death ==
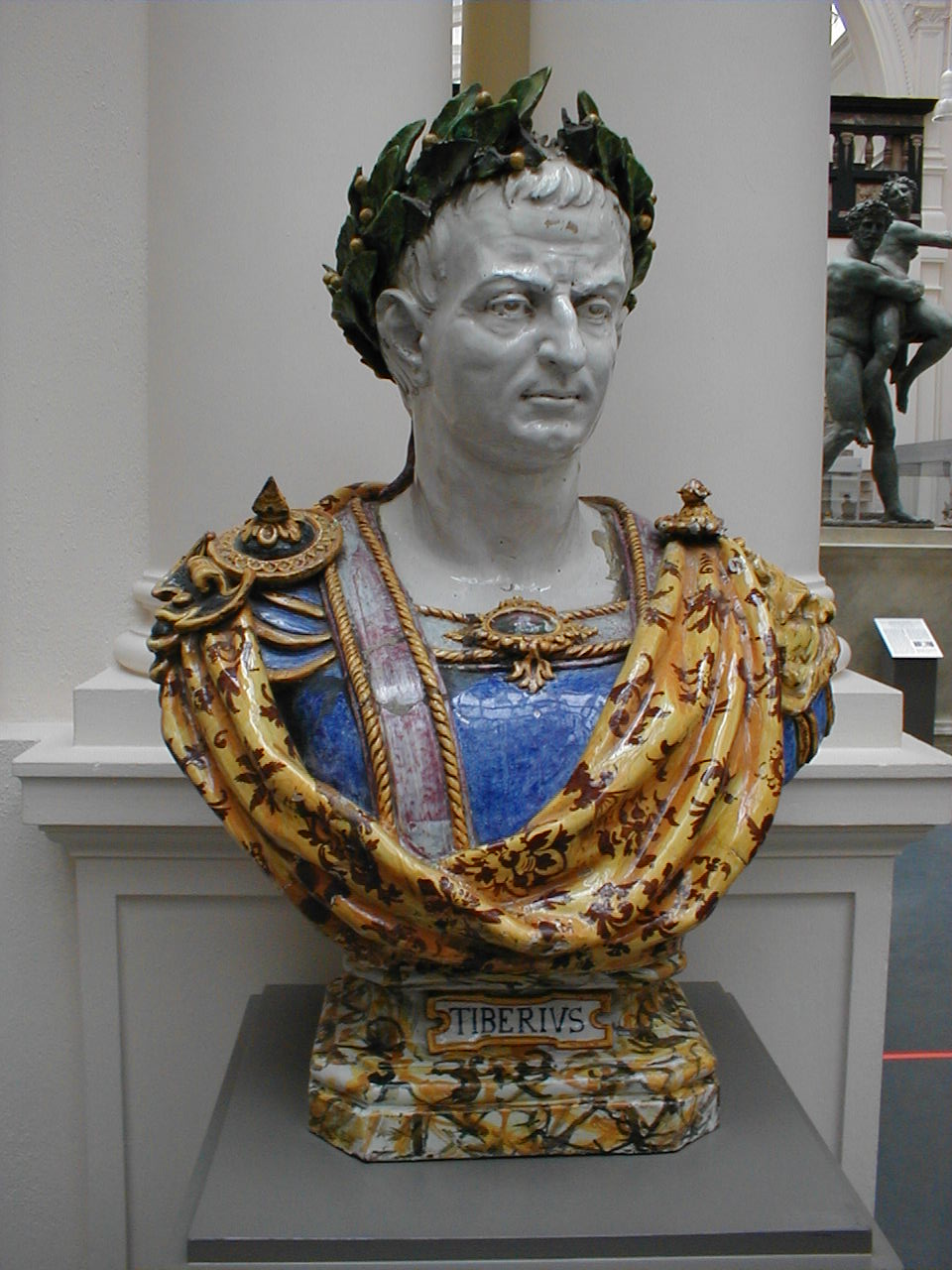
Tiberius

In Book 6 of The Annals Tacitus informs us that in 37 AD Arruntius and his paramour Albucilla were arraigned on charges of irreverence towards the emperor and adultery at the instigation of Macro. Arruntius, now in old age, committed suicide by opening his veins, tired of enduring a life of peril and scorn due to the tyranny of Sejanus and Macro. Arruntius was aware at this stage that Tiberius was ill and unlikely to recover; however, he foresaw only worse conditions to come under the reign of Tiberius' successor Caligula. He declared, "I cannot in my old age become the slave of a new master like him." Years later, Gaius Silius would say of him in the Senate that he had come to eminence by his "incorrupta vita" (blameless life).

== Arruntius in fiction ==
Arruntius appears in a 17th-century play written by English dramatist Ben Jonson called Sejanus His Fall.

Political offices
Preceded by Gaius Vibius Postumus; Gaius Ateius Capito as suffect consuls	Roman consul 6 with Marcus Aemilius Lepidus	Succeeded by Lucius Nonius Asprenas as suffect consul
