= Lucius Neratius Priscus =

Late 1st/early 2nd century Roman senator, suffect consul and governor

Lucius Neratius Priscus was a Roman senator and leading jurist, serving for a time as the head of the Proculeian school. He was suffect consul in the nundinium of May–June 97 as the colleague of Marcus Annius Verus.

== Family ==
The origins of the gens Neratia lie in the Italian town of Saepinum in the heart of Samnium; Priscus' father was the homonymous suffect consul of the year 87. He is known to have a younger brother, Lucius Neratius Marcellus, who was adopted by their uncle Marcus Hirrius Fronto Neratius Pansa who was suffect consul in either 73 or 74 and co-opted into the Patrician class; Marcellus became suffect consul two years before Priscus, and ordinary consul in 129.

The existence of a son with the identical name and consul in either 122 or 123, inferred from the existence of the possible governor of Pannonia Inferior, was disproved by a 1976 paper written by G. Camodeca, whose findings were embraced by Ronald Syme.

== Career ==
Most of Priscus' advancement through the cursus honorum has been established. His first known office was as military tribune with Legio XXII Primigenia between c. 79 to c. 80, in Mogontiacum (modern Mainz). Next he held the office of quaestor (c. 83/84), and upon completion of this traditional Republican magistracy Priscus would be enrolled in the Senate. The two other magistracies followed: plebeian tribune (c. 85/86) and praetor (c. 88/89); usually a senator would govern either a public or imperial praetorian province before becoming a consul, but none is known for Priscus. After serving as suffect consul, Priscus was admitted to the collegia of the Septemviri epulonum, one of the four most prestigious ancient Roman priesthoods. He was also entrusted with governing, in succession, the imperial provinces of Germania Inferior (98–101), then Pannonia (102–105).

The Digest of Justinian records that the emperor Trajan invoked the help of Priscus and Titius Aristo on a point of law. According to the Historia Augusta, there was a rumor that Trajan considered making Priscus his heir to the empire, before finally deciding on Hadrian to succeed him. Despite being a potential rival for the throne, Priscus was one of the legal experts the emperor Hadrian relied on for advice. Sir Ronald Syme looks to have considered Priscus as being another name used by or for Publius Cornelius Tacitus.

Political offices
Preceded by Gnaeus Arrius Antoninus II, and Gaius Calpurnius Piso as Suffect consuls	Suffect consul of the Roman Empire; 97 with Marcus Annius Verus	Succeeded by Lucius Domitius Apollinaris, and Sextus Hermentidius Campanus as Suffect consuls
