= Lucius Valerius Messalla Volesus =

Roman consul in 5 BC

Lucius Valerius Messalla Volesus was a Roman senator, who flourished under the reign of Emperor Augustus. He was consul in AD 5 with Gnaeus Cornelius Cinna Magnus as his colleague. His father, Potitus Valerius Messala, was suffect consul in 28 BC and prefect of the city of Rome.

Lucius was a tresviri monetalis, the most prestigious of the four boards that form the vigintiviri; Aulus Licinius Nerva Silianus, consul in AD 7, was one of the other two members of this board at the same time as Silius. Because assignment to this board was usually allocated to patricians, Ronald Syme sees this as evidence that Lucius was a member of that class.

Other offices Volesus held included proconsul of the Roman province of Asia. During the latter part of his career, Lucius was charged with crimes against humanity and found guilty. Although it has yet to be discovered, Augustus wrote of the fall of Lucius Valerius in his book, de Voleso Messala.

Political offices
Preceded by Gnaeus Sentius Saturninus, and Gaius Clodius Licinus as Suffect consuls	Consul of the Roman Empire; AD 5 with Gnaeus Cornelius Cinna Magnus	Succeeded by Gaius Vibius Postumus, and Gaius Ateius Capito as Suffect consuls
