= Sextus Caecilius Africanus =

2nd century Roman jurist

Sextus Caecilius Africanus (died ca. 169/175) was an ancient Roman jurist and a pupil of Salvius Julianus.

Only one quote (Dig. 30,39 pr.) remains of his Epistulae of at least twenty books. Excerpts of his Quaestiones, a collection of legal cases in no particular order in nine books, are also reproduced in the Digests. The Quaestiones are most likely intended for use in legal education. They also appear to be closely connected to Julianus' work, who is often cited in them; it is assumed that he decided the majority of these cases. Nonetheless, Caecilius at times also expresses his own opinion of Julianus, including critically (Dig. 19,2,33).

Another Sextus Caecilius is suspected by some sources to be a distinct Roman jurist, not to be confused with Africanus.

== See also ==
- Caecilia gens
