= Gaius Vibius Postumus =

Roman senator

Gaius Vibius Postumus was a Roman senator, who flourished under the reign of Augustus. He was suffect consul for the latter half of AD 5 with Gaius Ateius Capito as his colleague. Ronald Syme identifies him as a novus homo from Lavinum in Apulia. His brother Aulus Vibius Habitus was suffect consul in the latter half of AD 8.

Postumus shared in the achievements of Lucius Apronius and earned the ornamenta triumphalia for his distinguished valor in the Dalmatian revolt. He was also proconsular governor of Asia in the years 12 to 15. One of the poems of the Palatine Anthology, attributed to Apollonides, refers to the construction of a temple to Aphrodite by a Postumus; Syme identifies its author as Apollonides of Nicaea, and the person responsible for the temple as Vibius Postumus, who had the temple erected during his governorship.

Political offices
Preceded by Lucius Valerius Messalla Volesus, and Gnaeus Cornelius Cinna Magnus as Ordinary consuls	Suffect consul of the Roman Empire; AD 5 with Gaius Ateius Capito	Succeeded by Marcus Aemilius Lepidus, and Lucius Arruntius as Ordinary consuls
