= Aulus Ofilius =

Aulus Ofilius (Ofilius in Greek: ο Όφίλλιος, flourished 1st century BC) was a Roman jurist of Equestrian rank, who lived in the Roman Republic. He is named as a jurist by Pomponius. Ofilius was a friend to Roman statesman Marcus Tullius Cicero, dictator Gaius Julius Caesar and in opinion had opposed the jurist Trebatius Testa.

Ofilius was educated by the jurist Servius Sulpicius Rufus and in turn Ofilius became the tutor to the future jurists Quintus Aelius Tubero, Marcus Antistius Labeo and Gaius Ateius Capito. He obtained a high reputation for legal knowledge.

Ofilius had written various legal treaties. He had addressed one of his treaties to wealthy Equestrian and friend to Cicero, Titus Pomponius Atticus. Ofilius was also the author of an extensive commentary on Praetorian Edict or Proclamations. He is often cited in the Digest.

Pliny the Elder mentions in his Natural History Ofilius's wife Clodia, who he reports died at the age of 115. She may have been the daughters Appius Claudius Pulcher.

In Digest Ulpian is quoted when he mentions Ofilius concerning the health of slaves: "The question arises whether [a slave], whose tongue has been cut out, is healthy. This problem is dealt with by Ofilius in respect to horses. His opinion is in the negative."

== Sources ==
- https://web.archive.org/web/20070922034123/http://www.ancientlibrary.com/smith-bio/2352.html
- https://web.archive.org/web/20110522135657/http://www.oup.com/uk/orc/bin/9780199276073/resources/timeline/jurists_rep2.pdf
