= Potitus Valerius Messalla =

Roman senator

Potitus Valerius Messalla (c. 70 BC – after 17 BC) was an Ancient Roman statesman, probably a son of Marcus Valerius Messalla Rufus. He presumably had two sons: Manius Valerius Messalla Potitus and Lucius Valerius Messalla Volesus. In 17 BC, Messalla participated in the Secular games.

Career
Rank	Date
Quindecimvir	Before 43 BC – after 18 BC
Monetalis	c. 42 BC
Military tribune or quaestor	
Praetor	c. 32 BC
Suffect consul	29 BC
Proconsul of Asia	c. 25 – 23 BC
Legatus pro praetore of Syria	c. 19 – 18 BC

Political offices
Preceded by Augustus V Sextus Appuleius as ordinary consuls	Roman consul 29 BC (suffect) with Augustus V	Succeeded by Augustus VI; Marcus Agrippa as ordinary consuls
