= Proculus (jurist) =

1st century AD Roman jurist

Proculus (fl. 1st century CE) was an ancient Roman jurist who founded a distinctive tradition of the interpretation of Roman law. His followers were known as the "Proculiani", or Proculeans, after him.

The full name of Proculus is unknown. He apparently wrote at least eight books of legal epistles. Passages from his writings are repeatedly cited in legal digests, where his opinion is given in matters of dispute. Proculus appears to have developed the interpretations of the earlier jurist Marcus Antistius Labeo, on whose work he is said to have written a commentary.

Though Proculus did not always agree with Labeo, the two were usually paired in contrast with an alternative tradition identified with Ateius Capito and Masurius Sabinus, who founded the rival Sabinian school of interpretation, which was typically more conservative and rigid. The most famous topic of disagreement concerned the ownership of materials used to make something. Sabinus held that if an artist created a valuable painting or sculpture on wood of little value owned by another person, the original owner of the wood retained ownership, while Proculus argued that the form is more important than the material substance and therefore the artist owned it as he had made something new. This debate was later commented on by David Hume and Adam Smith.

Proculus appears to have lived during the late Julio-Claudian period, and is said to have practiced law under Nero. He may be identical to the Licinius Proculus, who was Praetorian Prefect in the reign of Otho.
