= Aetia gens =

The gens Aetia was an obscure ancient Roman gente.

== Members ==
- Quintus Aetius Victor, man mentioned on a loculite tablet
- Quintus Aetius Appollonius, man mentioned on a loculite tablet
- Aetius, supposed consul and son-in-law of emperor Septimius Severus mentioned in the Historia Augusta

=== Late Romans ===
- Aëtius of Antioch, 4th-century theologian and founder of Anomoeanism
- Aetius, 5th-century magister militum
- Aetius, 5th-century praetorian prefect
- Aëtius of Amida, 6th-century physician and medical writer

== See also ==
- List of Roman gentes
- Family in ancient Rome
- Ateia gens
