= Sabinian school =

Ancient Roman school of law

In ancient Rome, the Sabinian school was one of the two important schools of law during the 1st and 2nd centuries CE.

The Sabinians took their name from Masurius Sabinus but later were known as Cassians after Sabinus' student, Cassius Longinus.

Sabinian views were based on the teachings of Gaius Ateius Capito, Sabinus' instructor and an adherent of conservatism in the reign of Augustus (27 BCE–14 CE). Among the few characteristics discernible in the attitude of the Sabinians was a legal conservatism reflecting their founder. In opposition to the Sabinians was the Proculeian school. A rivalry between the schools lasted well into the 2nd century, when they were united.

The most famous head of the Sabinians was Salvius Julianus who succeeded Javolenus Priscus as head of the school.
