= The Emperor Augustus Rebuking Cornelius Cinna for His Treachery =

Painting by Étienne-Jean Delécluze

- Artist: Étienne-Jean Delécluze
- Year: 1814
- Type: Oil on canvas, history painting
- Dimensions: 214.1 cm × 263.9 cm (84.3 in × 103.9 in)
- Location: Bowes Museum, County Durham

The Emperor Augustus Rebuking Cornelius Cinna for His Treachery is an 1814 history painting by the French artist Étienne-Jean Delécluze. Inspired by the 1641 tragedy Cinna Pierre Corneille, it depicts the moment the Roman Emperor Augustus reveals to Cinna that he has uncovered his part in a plot against him. Although he is being rebuked for his betrayal, unknown to Cinna, the emperor plans to pardon him. Delécluze had been a pupil of Jacques-Louis David and painted in the Neoclassical style.

The painting was exhibited at the Salon of 1814 held at the Louvre in Paris it received criticism for being too theatrical for a history painting, with a suggestion that Cinna strongly resembled the famous actor. François-Joseph Talma. The painting is now in the Bowes Museum in County Durham, having been gifted by the founders in 1888.

== Bibliography ==
- Jenkins, Adrian & Baker, Amy (ed.) The Road to Impressionism: Joséphine Bowes and Painting in Nineteenth Century France. Bowes Museum, 2002.
- Milam, Jennifer & ten-Doesschate Chu, Peter. Beyond Chinoiserie: Artistic Exchange Between China and the West During the Late Qing Dynasty Brill, 2018.
- Wrigley, Richard (ed.) Art, Theatre, and Opera in Paris, 1750-1850: Exchanges and Tensions. Taylor & Francis, 2017.
