= Matia gens =

Ancient Roman family

The gens Matia was a minor plebeian family at ancient Rome during the first century BC, and into imperial times. The gens is best known from a single individual, Gaius Matius, surnamed Calvena, a learned eques, who was an intimate friend of both Caesar and Cicero.

== Members ==
- Gaius Matius Calvena, the friend of Caesar and Cicero, subsequently befriended Octavian, but never exploited his relationship for personal gain. He is probably the same Gaius Matius who translated the Iliad into Latin, and wrote several other well-respected works on economics, agriculture, and cookery.
- Gaius Matius Sabinius Sullinus Vatinianus Anicius Maximus Caesulenus Martialis Pisibanus Lepidus, Flamen Julianus about AD 186, was consul suffectus in an uncertain year.

== See also ==
- List of Roman gentes
