= Marcus Antonius Gnipho =

Grammarian and tutor of Julius Caesar

Marcus Antonius Gnipho (fl. 1st century BC) was a grammarian and teacher of rhetoric of Gaulish origin who taught in ancient Rome.

Born in Gaul, he was exposed as a child, but was found, and grew up a slave. He was later freed, and according to Roman naming conventions took the nomen and praenomen of his former master, one Marcus Antonius.

He may have been educated in Alexandria. He had a great memory and was well-read in both Greek and Latin. He was first employed as the private tutor of the young Julius Caesar, and later set up a school in his own house, where it is said he never haggled over pay, but relied on his pupils' generosity. The great orator Marcus Tullius Cicero is said to have frequented his school while praetor in 66 BC. Ateius the Philologist was another of his pupils.

Gnipho wrote a number of works, including De Latino Sermone ("On the Latin Language") in two books. The surviving Rhetorica ad Herennium has been ascribed to him, but this is not widely accepted; otherwise, none of Gnipho's works survive. Scholarly opinion in antiquity was that only De Latino Sermone was his, and that all other works ascribed to him were written by his disciples. He died at the age of fifty.

== References and sources ==
Sources

- Suetonius, Lives of Eminent Grammarians 7, 10
- Quintilian, Institutio Oratoria 1:6.23
- Macrobius, Saturnalia 3.12
- William Smith, Dictionary of Greek and Roman Biography and Mythology, 1870, Vol. 2 p. 297
