= Grammarian (Greco-Roman) =

Academic position in the Roman Republic/Empire

In the Greco-Roman world, the grammarian (Latin: grammaticus) was responsible for the second stage in the traditional education system, after a boy had learned his basic Greek and Latin. The job of the grammarian was to teach the ancient poets such as Homer and Virgil, and the correct way of speaking before a boy moved on to study under the rhetor. Despite often humble origins, some grammarians went on to achieve elevated positions in Rome, though few enjoyed financial success.

== Grammar ==
Around 100 BC, Dionysius Thrax defined grammar as an "acquired expertise of the general usage of poets and prose writers". He identified six elements to the field:

1. Accurate reading aloud
2. Explanation of literary devices
3. Comments on subject matter
4. Comments on etymologies
5. Working out analogical regularities
6. The critical study of literature.

Nearly two hundred years later, Quintilian defined the subject as the knowledge of proper speaking and the explication of the poets.

== Position ==
According to Suetonius, the study of grammar was not even practiced in Rome's early period, let alone held in any high regard. He attributed this to early Rome's martial character and lack of free time to pursue literary education.

It was not until Crates of Mallus broke his leg while visiting Rome from Pergamum and gave frequent lectures on the topic during his convalescence, that the study of grammar was introduced to the city. He provided a basis for the Romans themselves to proceed from, and the teaching of the subject gradually grew in prevalence and estimation. Eventually, even the most distinguished citizens wrote concerning the subject and there were at times over twenty well-attended schools teaching grammar in Rome.

Grammarians came to be both highly esteemed and well paid. From then on the teaching of grammar also made its way to the provinces with many of the best teachers travelling out of Rome to teach.

Some grammarians achieved elevated positions in the Roman world and enjoyed preferential treatment, despite their relatively lowly job and often humble origins. They were exempt from local taxes in Rome for instance. By tutoring the children of the wealthy, grammarians could meet and become associated with prominent families in Rome. Marcus Antonius Gnipho was part of the household of Julius Caesar. This despite the fact that some noted grammarians had originally been brought to Rome as captives. Twelve of the twenty grammarians described by Suetonius in De Illustribus Grammaticis had been slaves.

Latin grammarians, like their Greek equivalents, came from all over the Roman Empire, including Syria, Spain, Gaul, Athens and Italy.

== See also ==
- Alexandrine grammarians
- Biblical grammarians
- Linguist
- Philologist
