= Salvius Julianus =

Roman jurist and politician

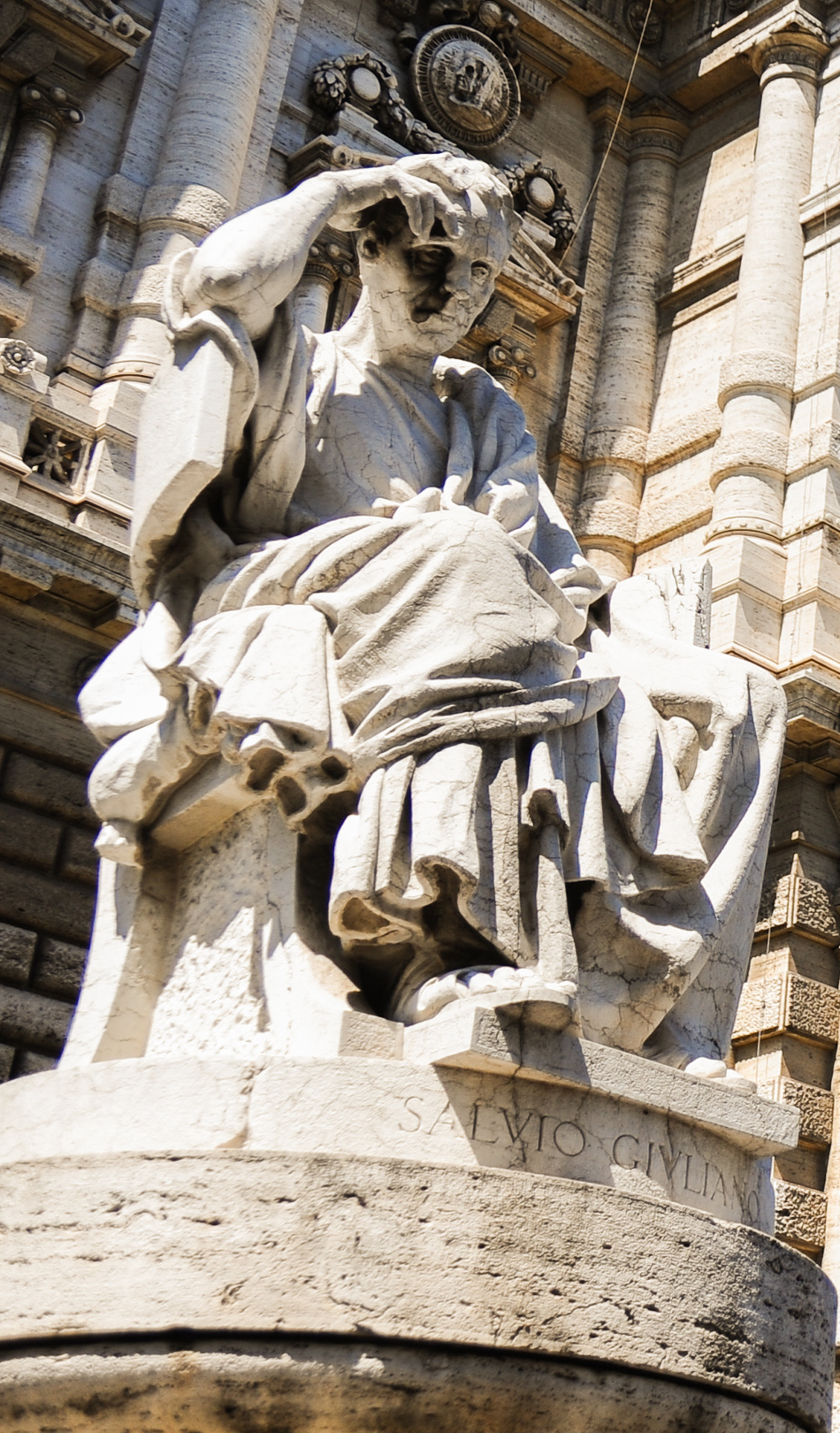
Salvius Julianus, Statue, Palazzo di Giustizia, Rome, Italy

Lucius Octavius Cornelius Publius Salvius Iulianus Aemilianus (c. 110 – c. 170), generally referred to as Salvius Julianus, or Julian the Jurist, or simply Julianus, was a well known and respected jurist, public official, and politician who served in the Roman imperial state. Of north African origin, he was active during the long reigns of the emperors Hadrian (r. 117–138), Antoninus Pius (r. 138–161), and Marcus Aurelius (r. 161–180), as well as the shorter reign of Marcus Aurelius' first co-Emperor, Lucius Verus (r. 161–169).

In the Roman government, Julianus gradually rose in rank through a traditional series of offices. He was successively quaestor to the Emperor Hadrian (with double the usual salary), plebeian tribune, praetor, praefectus aerarii Saturni, and praefectus aerarii militaris, before assuming the high annual office of Roman consul in 148. Julianus also served in the emperor's inner circle, the consilium principis, which functioned something like a modern cabinet, directing new legislation, but also sometimes like a court of law. "Hadrian organized it as a permanent council composed of members (jurists, high imperial functionaries of equestrian rank, and senators) appointed for life (consiliarii)." In the 4th-century Historia Augusta, the Emperor Hadrian's consilium principis included Julianus.

Though Julianus for decades served several emperors in succession, at high levels of the Roman imperial government, to investigate the details of his jurisprudence his written works on law are the primary sources. "The task of his life consisted, in the first place, in the final consolidation of the edictal law; and, secondly, in the composition of his great Digest in ninety books."

== Life and career ==
Julianus was born during the last years of the Emperor Trajan (r. 98–117), probably at the village of Pupput near the Roman colony of Hadrumetum, on the east coast of Africa Province (now modern Sousse in Tunisia). Apparently he came from a Latin-speaking family. At Hadrumetum, an inscription has been discovered which describes his career in office.

He studied law with Javolenus Priscus, the head of the Sabinian school of legal thought. Julianus refers to Javolenus in his mature legal writings. Even as a young man he was renowned for his learning. According to his contemporary the Roman jurist Sextus Pomponius, Julianus (along with Aburnius Valens and Tuscianus) eventually came to lead for a time this very influential school of jurisprudence. A student of Julianus, namely Sextus Caecilius Africanus, perhaps later followed as the head of this Sabinian school.

During the Principate the classical Roman law flourished. Two schools of legal thought contended: the Proculian (earlier linked to Labeo) and the Sabinian. It appears there was some rivalry between Julianus, who led the Sabinian, and another Roman jurist, a contemporary named Publius Iuventius Celsus, who led the Proculian. Neither one quoted the other in his writings, apparently. Among long-standing, close colleagues of Julianus were the aforementioned jurists Africanus and Pomponius.

During this period Hadrian (r.117–138) also appointed Julianus to revise into final form the Praetor's Edict, which up until then had been announced annually. Thereafter, Iulianus became occupied with writing his own substantial commentary on developments in Roman law, his celebrated Digestorum libri xc [Digesta in 90 books].

Under the next emperor, Antoninus Pius, Julianus continued serving in the imperial council, the consilium principis. Subsequently, he became governor of Germania Inferior under Antoninus Pius, and later governor of Hispania Tarraconensis under the emperor Marcus Aurelius. Julianus then returned to his native region where, c. 168–169, he concluded his career as proconsul of Africa Province. He seems to have died during the co-reign of Lucius Verus (r.161-169).

Little is known of his private life. Yet Julianus (whose own date of birth is uncertain) evidently was related to the emperor Didius Iulianus (133–193, r.193). Perhaps through his daughter from Hadrumetum, who married into "one of the most prominent families of Mediolanum" (modern Milan), he became the grandfather of Didius Iulianus, or else his uncle. Yet Didius was unfortunately a notorious scoundrel, who nonetheless was evidently raised by the mother of the noble Emperor Marcus Aurelius (r.161–180).

== Legal works ==
Senatus Populusque Romanus.

=== The Praetor's Edict ===
Soon after 125, the emperor Hadrian appointed Julianus to collect and revise all the edicta praetorum or Praetors' Edicts available. For centuries each incoming praetor urbanus had issued these annual edicts, which announced his legal positions for the next year. "The contents of the praetorian Edict can be summed up as constituting the praetor's programme of office: he is announcing to the public, at the beginning of his term, how he intends to exercise his office." For centuries, until the end of the Republic (to 44 BC), this document had been a most influential and pervasive legal authority in Roman law. By the 2nd century, however, the Praetor's Edict merely might adopt novel procedures to enforce new legislation made elsewhere, e.g., by imperial enactment. In a senatus consultum, Hadrian directed that the revision by Iulianus thereafter be made perpetual. Professor Michael Grant writes that his revision proved to be of some use to the poor. Another scholar writes, "The Edict, that masterpiece of republican jurisprudence, became stabilized. ... By order of [Hadrian] the famous jurist Julian settled the final form of the praetorian and aedilician Edicts."

Yet our sources for this major reform are "meagre and late", so that it "is difficult to tell what Julianus in fact did." A key feature of the Praetor's Edict was its organisational scheme, the order in which the various subjects of the law are presented. This sequence had obviously "grown up gradually from one generation to another. How far Julian's final redaction departs from the hitherto traditional arrangement we have not the means of judging save in some exceptional cases." Nonetheless, certain changes in the Edict wrought by Julianus are well known, e.g., regarding intestate succession, that affecting shares of inheritance among children in the Bonorum possessio unde liberi. Moreover, his other alterations do not seem problematic. It was this received "edictal order of topics" that was already widely used in juristic works of the Principate, during the classical period of Roman Law. Among Roman jurists, "Julian's work on the Edict was traditionally regarded as of great importance [as] he is repeatedly spoken of as compositor, conditor, ordinator of the Edict."

=== His Digesta in 90 books ===
Of his own writings, his principal work was the Digesta, a systematic treatise on civil and praetorian law which was often cited by Roman legal writers. “It is a comprehensive collection of responsa on real and hypothetical cases; in general, it followed the edictal system.” The works of Iulianus, in particular his Digesta, "are among the most highly appreciated products of Roman juristic literature."

Prof. Schulz, however, notes the reluctance of classical Roman jurists to formulate principles. "Even in the more theoretical works, such as Julian's... Digesta, case law is dominant, and no attempt is made to translate the cases into abstract principles." This literature, however, does employ "casuistical form" rather than "simply strung together" responsa.

"[P]roblems are considered from the point of view of general theory, with the result that imagined cases play a considerable, perhaps even a predominant, part. But even so, a plain statement of the theoretical result of the cases, a formulation of the principle to be deduced from them, is avoided."

Other scholars remark on the ascendancy that his writings earned Julianus. According to Prof. Buckland, his presence worked to transcend the opposing schools or sects of Roman law which had continued for several centuries. Prof. Sohm states:

"His vast acquaintance with practical case-law, the ingenuity of his own countless decisions, his genius for bringing out, in each separate case, the general rule of law which, tersely and pithily put, strikes the mind with all the force of a brilliant aphorism and sheds its light over the whole subject around--these are the features which constitute the power of his work. Roman jurisprudence had completed its dialectic training under Labeo and Sabinus, and the time had now arrived for applying to the immense mass of materials the principles, categories, and points of view that had been thus worked out. Julian's Digest exhibited Roman jurisprudence in all its strength, and its success was proportionately great. ... From the time of Salvius Julianus, and as a consequence of his labors, there was but one jurisprudence, and the lines on which it was progressing were those marked out by him."

The purpose of his Digesta was to expound the whole of Roman law. "It contains a collection of responsa of the most varied kinds: answers by letter, answers in disputations (to be inferred when the answer is introduced by dixi), true responsa in the technical sense, and answers to questions which occurred to the author in the course of theoretical speculation."

=== Other works ===
It is known that "Julianus also wrote commentaries on works of two earlier, [now] little known jurists, Urseius Felix [Urseius, 4 books] and Minicius [Minicius, 6 books], and a booklet De ambiguitatibus [On doubtful questions]."

=== Excerpts in Corpus Juris Civilis ===
Following are short quotations of Julianus (c. 110 – c. 170) presented, chiefly from his Digesta, also from his Minicius and his Urseius, taken from among Julian's hundreds found in the Corpus Juris Civilis (Byzantium 533), as commissioned and promulgated by the Emperor Justinian I (r.527–565), namely, in that part of the Corpus called the Digesta Iustiniani, in 50 books. These quotations are translated here by Alan Watson as The Digest of Justinian, published by the University of Pennsylvania (Philadelphia 1985), two volumes. Traditional Digest citation (book, chapter, source) follows the quotation.

- libri 7 digestorum: "If the seller has misrepresented the condition of a farm but not its measurements, he is still liable to the buyer; for example, suppose he said there were fifty jugera of vineyard and fifty of meadow, and the meadow is found to be larger but there are one hundred jugera in all." 19.1.22
- libri 13 digestorum: "When we indeed agree on the thing delivered but differ over the grounds of delivery, I see no reason why the delivery should not be effective. ... Again, if I give you coined money as a gift and you receive it as a loan, it is settled law that the fact that we disagree on the grounds of delivery and acceptance is no barrier to the transfer of ownership to you." 41.1.36
- libri 15 digestorum: "It is not possible for every point to be specifically dealt with either in statutes or in senatus consulta; but whenever in any case their sense is clear, the president of the tribunal ought to proceed by analogical reasoning and declare the law accordingly." 1.3.12
- libri 27 digestorum: "We cannot follow a rule of law in instances where there has been a decision against the ratio juris. 1.3.15 [Here, the latin text at the top of the article: In his, quae contra rationem iuris constituta sunt, non possumus sequi regulam iuris.]
- libri 54 digestorum: "The nature of a cavil, which the Greeks call sorites, is this, that the argument leads by short steps from what is evidently true to what is evidently false." 50.17.65
- libri 59 digestorum: "[A] person conceived after his grandfather's death can neither take the estate on the latter's intestacy as suus heres nor receive bonorum possessio as cognate relative, because the Law of the Twelve Tables calls to the inheritance a person who has been alive at the time of the death of the man whose property is in question." 38.16.6
- libri 84 digestorum: "Age-encrusted custom is not undeservedly cherished as having almost statutory force, and this is the kind of law which is said to be established by use and wont. For given that statutes themselves are binding upon us for no other reason than that they have been accepted by the judgment of the populace, certainly it is fitting that what the populace has accepted without any writing shall be binding upon everyone. What does it matter whether the people declares its will by voting or by the very substance of its actions? Accordingly, it is absolutely right to accept the point that statutes may be repealed not only by vote of the legislature but also by the silent agreement of everyone expressed through desuetude." 1.3.32:1
- libri 88 digestorum: "Whenever anyone stipulates for oil under a time clause or other condition, its value ought to be assessed when the obligation vests; for from that moment it can be sued for. If it is otherwise, the loss is the debtor's." 45.1.59
- libri 6 minicius: "If it is agreed that a landlord should not bring an action against a tenant and there was a lawful ground for the agreement, the tenant nevertheless can bring an action against the landlord." 2.14.56
- libri 3 urseius ferax: "A man agreed to buy land from one who had mortgaged it to a third party, provided that the vendor discharged the encumbrance before the first of July. The question was whether the purchaser could effectively bring the action on purchase to require the vendor to redeem the land. The reply was: Let us consider what was agreed between the parties. If their agreement was that come what may, the vendor should redeem the land before the first of July, the action on purchase will lie for its redemption and the sale will not be regarded as conditional, as though the purchaser said, 'I will buy the land, if you redeem it by the first of July' or 'provided that you redeem it in that time from Titius.' But if the purchase were made under condition, there will be no action to get the condition realized." 18.1.41

== Influence and legacy ==
=== Among Roman jurists ===
His opinions influenced many other jurists, thanks to the clarity and finesse of his reasoning, as is demonstrated by the fact that, in the Digest, there are 457 fragments written by Iulianus. His name also appears first in the list of contributing jurisprudents prepared by order of Justinian, the Index Florentinus. Centuries after his death, Emperor Justinianus would refer to him as legum et edicti perpetui suptilissimus conditor.

The 2nd-century Digesta of Salvius Iulianus was repeatedly excerpted, hundreds of times, by the compilers of the 6th-century Pandectae (or Digest), created under the authority of the Byzantine emperor Justinian I (r. 527–565). This imperial Pandect or Digest (part of the Corpus Juris Civilis) was meant by the emperor to serve as a compendium of juristic experience and learning, being drawn from the works of prior Roman jurists. "It has been thought that Justinian's compilers used [Julian's Digest] as the basis of their scheme: in any case nearly 500 passages are quoted from it."

Julian died during the reign of the philosophical emperor Marcus Aurelius (r.161-180), who described him in a rescript as amicus noster. "His fame did not lessen as time went on, for later Emperors speak of him in the most laudatory terms. ... Justinian speaks of him as the most illustrious of the jurists."

=== Among modern scholars ===
"[S]ome modern authorities would regard [Iulianus] as the greatest of all the Roman jurists, not excluding even Papinian." "With Iulianus, the Roman jurisprudence reached its apogee." Professor William Warwick Buckland and Professor Peter Stein take stock of Iulianus, his rôle and style, and compare him to a great jurist who flourished during the 18th century:

No other jurist exercised so great an influence on the destinies of the law."

His Digest was

a comprehensive treatise on both civil and praetorian law. ... The principal characteristics of Julian's work seem to be a very lucid style and a clear recognition of the fact that legal conceptions must move with the times. He seems to have played somewhat the part which Lord Mansfield did in English law. He did a great work of co-ordination and generalisation, sweeping away unreal and pedantic distinctions. [Prof.] Karlowa justly observes that the appearance of Julian was epoch-making.

Professor Fritz Schulz places the Roman jurist Iulianus in the context of the growth and development of Roman law, praising his personal contribution made when Roman jurisprudence reached its full height:

The heroic age of creative geniuses and daring pioneers had passed away with the Republic. Now their ideas were to be developed to the full and elaborated down to the last detail. The culminating point in the curve of this development lies unquestionably with the age of Trajan and Hadrian, when the Principate itself reached its zenith. Julian's Digesta are the greatest product of Roman jurisprudence; they dominate legal science till the end of the Principate. After Julian a slight decline is sometimes observable, but on the whole the science of law remained on the same high level till the middle of the third century.

== See also ==
- Africanus
- Pomponius
- Sabinus
- Labeo
- Celsus
- Papinian
- Ulpian
- Principate
- Hadrian

Political offices
| Preceded by Sextus Cocceius Severianus Honorinus; Gaius Popilius Carus Pedo as suffecti | Roman consul AD 148 with Gaius Bellicius Calpurnius Torquatus | Succeeded by Satyrius Firmus; Gaius Salvius Capito as suffecti |
