= Étienne-Jean Delécluze =

French painter and critic (1781–1863)

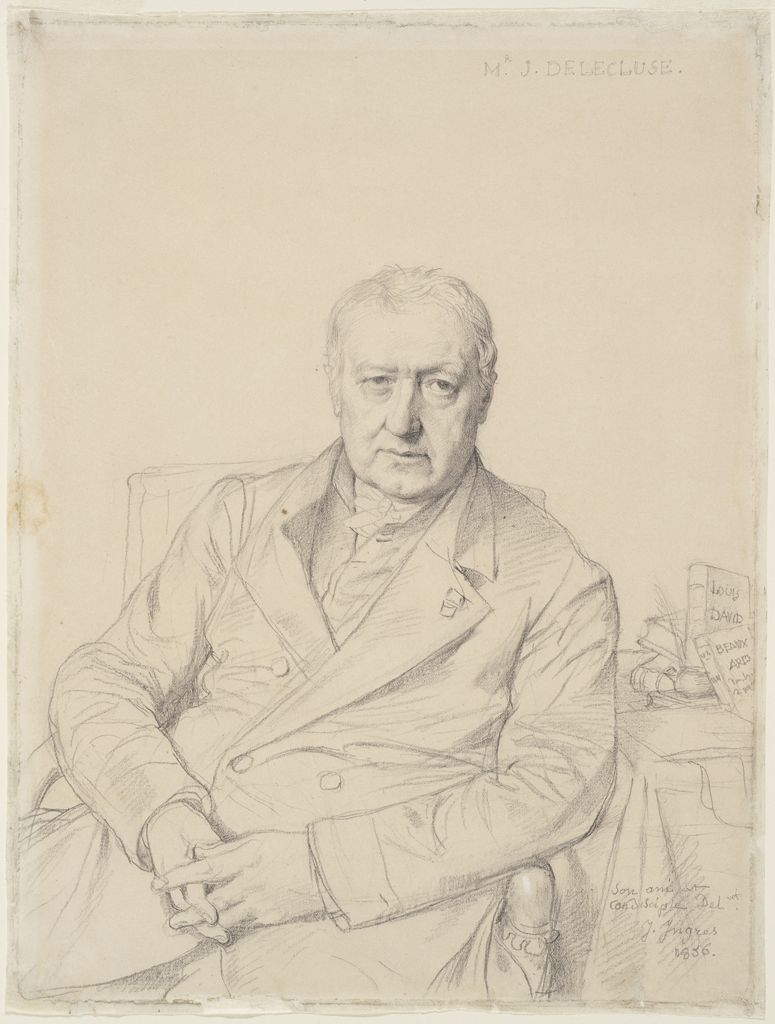
Étienne-Jean Delécluze

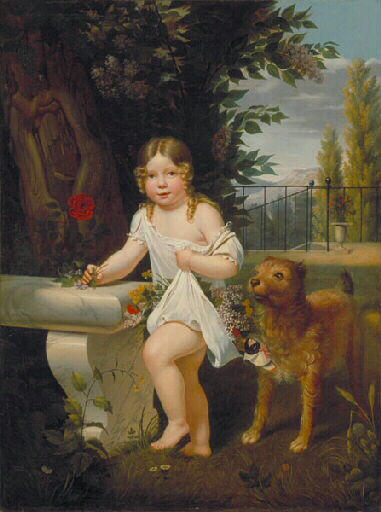
Etienne-Jean Delecluze, For my dad, 1818. Musée des Ursulines, Mâcon

Etienne-Jean Delécluze (French pronunciation: [etjɛn ʒɑ̃ dəleklyz]) (26 February 1781 – 12 July 1863) was a French painter and critic.

From 1797 on, he was a pupil of Jacques-Louis David, as he describes in his biography of David.
As one of his favorite pupils, he was invited to David's last meal in France before going to Brussels in 1816.
From 1822 on, he worked as a critic for the Journal des débats.

The Emperor Augustus Rebuking Cornelius Cinna for His Treachery which was exhibited at the Salon of 1814

His book Louis David, son école et son temps (Paris, 1857) was quite politically controversial, and he had to rewrite it in order to restore his reputation.

He was a maternal uncle of Eugène Viollet-le-Duc and in charge of Viollet-le-Duc's education for some time.
