= Gaius Matius =

Roman agriculturist

Gaius Matius (fl. 1st century BC) (PW 1) was a citizen of ancient Rome notable as a friend of Julius Caesar and of Cicero, who described him in a letter to Trebatius (53BC) as "homo suavissimus doctissimusque" (transl. a very sweet and learned man). (Cic. Fam. 7,15,2)

A member of the gens Matia, he belonged to the party of Caesar, and helped Cicero in his relationship with Caesar in 49 and 48 BC. After the murder of Caesar, Matius, a dedicated Caesarian, warned of potential for grave repercussions including possible rebellions in Gaul or revolts of Caesar's legions. When Octavian came to Rome, Matius became one of his close associates. Matius and Octavian managed the July 44 BC games honoring the recently assassinated dictator. An exchange of letters between Cicero and Matius later in 44 has been preserved (Letters to Friends, 11.27 f.).

A Gaius Matius (PW 2) is recorded as a friend and assistant of Caesar Augustus, an eques who wrote three volumes on gastronomy (Columella credits him with "mincemeat à la Matius" (minutal Matianum)), and was said by Pliny the Elder to have invented the clipping of shrubs in topiary. It is unclear however if this is the same person, or a later generation: Ronald Syme supposes the later Matius to be the son of the first.

According to the Real Academia Española, the Spanish word for apple, manzana (and thus the related Portuguese maçã and Galician mazá) derives from Matiāna mala, "apples of Matius". which was mentioned by Pliny and others among fruits that had been recently introduced to Roman tables.
