= Cornelius Bocchus =

1st century Roman natural history author

Lucius Cornelius Bocchus was a Lusitanian from Roman Hispania who wrote about natural history. Ancient authors mention his writings, which are otherwise lost. Pliny the Elder provides an excerpt from the chronicle of Cornelius Bocchus and mentions him as one of his sources.

== Sources ==
- Delporte, Frédéric. Les minéraux : l'histoire de leur commerce
- Corpus Scriptorium Latinorum^{[usurped]}
- Hofmann, Johann Jacob (1635-1706)
- Historia da Lingua Portuguesa. Revista Lusitana. vol XXV, N 1-4
