= Masurius Sabinus =

1st century AD Roman jurist and leader of the Sabiniani, a school of legal thought

Masurius Sabinus, also Massurius, was a Roman jurist who lived in the time of Tiberius (reigned 14–37 AD). Unlike most jurists of the time, he was not of senatorial rank and was admitted to the equestrian order only rather late in life, by virtue of his exceptional ability and imperial patronage. Masurius was the first person to give "state-certified opinions" (publice respondere), a privilege granted by the emperor which marked increasing imperial control over the judicial process after the end of the Roman Republic. Before the Principate of Augustus, the value of legal opinions was based on the expertise of those who gave them. The passage in the Digest of Justinian that discusses the granting of Masurius's authority is thus a pivotal point in the history of Roman law.

Masurius was a leader of the Sabiniani, a school or sect of legal thought in the 1st and 2nd centuries AD. He was succeeded by a line of jurists including Gnaeus Arulenus Caelius Sabinus (consul 69 AD), Gaius Cassius Longinus (hence adherents of the school are also referred to as the Cassiani), Javolenus Priscus, and Salvius Julianus. Gaius Ateius Capito was the founder of the school. They were rivals to the Proculiani, named after Proculus, but despite many references in Gaius to their controversies, it is hard to disentangle consistent views for each. Gaius seems to have counted himself among the Sabinians. It may be that the Sabinian school were strict constructivists, while the Proculians exercised greater latitude in their arguments.

Masurius's principal work was a treatise on civil law (ius civile) in three volumes, which had extensive influence. Later jurists such as Ulpian wrote commentaries on his work, but preserved no excerpts.
