= Gaius Ateius Capito (jurist) =

Roman jurist in the time of emperors Augustus and Tiberius

Gaius Ateius Capito (about 30 BCE – 22 CE) was a Roman jurist in the time of emperors Augustus and Tiberius. He was consul suffectus in the year 5 from July to December as the colleague of Gaius Vibius Postumus.

== Life ==
Capito was a son of the tribune of the same name, and was educated as a jurist by Aulus Ofilius. He was active as a jurist and a senator. Capito was a strong proponent of the principate which brought him in opposition to Marcus Antistius Labeo. In the year 11, he became curator aquarum and was responsible for water supply and regulation throughout the city of Rome. Four years later he and Lucius Arruntius were entrusted by Tiberius to work on a plan to confine the river Tiber after heavy floods, but the project was not carried out due to heavy resistance from the populace.

Capito is attested as witnessing a number of legal documents. One was a senatus consultum that prohibited Senators, equites, and their descendants from actively participating in gladiatorial matches. In another, he was one of seven witnesses of the Senatus consultum de Cn. Pisone patre, the Roman Senate's official act concerning the trial and punishment of Gnaeus Calpurnius Piso, dated 10 December 20 CE. His successor in the office of curator aquarum was Tarius Rufus.

He does not appear to have had any descendants. G.V. Sumner has speculated, based on the names, that Capito adopted the son of Sejanus, Capito Aelianus.

== Works ==
All of Capito's works are lost and are only known by their titles through quotes by later authors. Works known to have existed include:

- De pontificio iure ("About pontifical law"), at least six books about laws concerning the pontifices
- De Indiciis Publicis ("On Public Trials"), recorded by Aulus Gellius, who claims that it mentioned the treason trial of Claudia during the First Punic War.
- De iure sacrificiorum ("About sacrificial law")
- Coniectanea ("Miscellaneous"), at least 9 books about various themes
- De officio senatorio ("About the senatorial office")
- One work of unknown title about the auguries
- Epistulae ("Letters")

== Influence ==
Capito had considerable reputation as a jurist and gathered a school of jurists that became known as the Sabinian school after his pupil and successor Masurius Sabinus. Capito's works were read and quoted until the sixth century, although more frequently by lexicographers (especially by Sextus Pompeius Festus and Aulus Gellius) than by jurists.

== See also ==
- Ateia (gens)

== Sources ==
- Der kleine Pauly. Lexikon der Antike. München 1979.
- C. Atei Capitornis Fragmenta, L. Strzelecki (ed.), Wroclaw, Polska Akademia Nauk, 1960.
- Tacitus, Annals
- Frontinus, De aquis urbis Romae

Political offices
Preceded by L. Valerius Messalla Volesus; Gn. Cornelius Cinna Magnus	Consul of the Roman Empire; July–December AD 5 with Gaius Vibius Postumus	Succeeded by M. Aemilius Lepidus; Lucius Arruntius
