= Marcus Antistius Labeo =

Roman jurist and author

Marcus Antistius Labeo (died 10 or 11 AD) was a Roman jurist.

== Biography ==
Marcus Antistius Labeo was the son of Pacuvius Labeo, a jurist who caused himself to be slain after the defeat of his party at Philippi. Since his name was different from his father's, he was presumably adopted by an otherwise unknown Antistius. A member of plebeian nobility in easy circumstances, young Labeo entered public life early. Marcus Antistius rose quickly to the praetorship; but undisguised antipathy for the new regime and the brusque manner he occasionally gave expression to Republican sympathies in the Senate – what Tacitus calls his incorrupta libertas – proved an obstacle to his advancement. His rival, Ateius Capito, a loyal client of new ruling powers, was promoted by Caesar Augustus to the consulate even though Labeo was in line for the job. Smarting under the wrong done him, Labeo declined the office when it was offered to him in a subsequent year.

From this time he seems to have devoted his whole time to jurisprudence. His training in the science had been derived principally from Trebatius Testa. To his knowledge of the law he added a wide general culture, devoting his attention specially to dialectics, philology (grammatica), and antiquities, as valuable aids in the exposition, expansion, and application of legal doctrine. Down to the time of Hadrian his was probably the name of greatest authority; and several of his works were abridged and annotated by later hands.

While Capito is hardly ever referred to, the dicta of Labeo are of constant recurrence in the writings of the classical jurists, such as Gaius, Ulpian and Julius Paulus; and no inconsiderable number of them were thought worthy of preservation in Justinian's Digest. Labeo gets the credit of being the founder of the Proculian school, while Capito is spoken of as the founder of the rival Sabinian one; but it is probable that the real founders of the two scholae were Proculus and Masurius Sabinus, followers respectively of the methods of Labeo and Capito.

Labeo's most important literary work was the Libri posteriores, so called because published only after his death. It contained a systematic exposition of the common law. His Libri ad Edictum embraced a commentary, not only on the edicts of the urban and peregrine praetors, but also on that of the curule aediles. His Probabilium lib. VIII., a collection of definitions and axiomatic legal propositions, seems to have been one of his most characteristic productions.
