= Nerva (disambiguation) =

Nerva (30–98) was a Roman emperor, reigning 96–98.

Nerva may also refer to:

== Other Roman cognomina ==
- Nerva Traianus, or Trajan (53–117), Roman emperor (reigning 98–117)
- Cocceii Nervae, a family of the gens Cocceia
  - Marcus Cocceius Nerva (disambiguation), politicians and relatives of emperor Nerva
- Licinii Nervae, a family of the gens Licinia.
- Quintus Acutius Nerva, Roman consul in AD 100, from the gens Acutia
- Publius Licinius Nerva, Propraetor (Governor) of Sicily whose fecklessness led to the Second Servile War

== Other uses ==
- Nerva, Huelva, municipality in Huelva province, Spain
- Nuclear Engine for Rocket Vehicle Application (NERVA), part of a NASA project to produce a nuclear thermal rocket engine
- Nerva, a character in the American science fiction action film Ultraviolet (2006)
- Space Station Nerva, a fictional space station from the Doctor Who serial episode arcs "The Ark in Space" (1975; S12E05-08) and "Revenge of the Cybermen" (1975; S12E17-20)

== See also ==
- Nervi (disambiguation)
- Nervo (disambiguation)
