= Lucius Cornelius Pusio Annius Messala (consul 90) =

Late 1st/early 2nd century Roman senator, consul and governor

Lucius Cornelius Pusio Annius Messala was a Roman senator who replaced the emperor Domitian as suffect consul from 13 January 90 to the end of February. He is also known by the shorter form of his name, Lucius Cornelius Pusio.

A suffect consul with the same name has been attested for the reign of Vespasian, who was the colleague of Plotius Pegasus. Until the existence of the suffect of the year 90 was proven, inscriptions mentioning the younger Pusio were thought to refer to the older, most notably one recovered from Tibur. The relationship between the two men is not conclusively known, although the identical names strongly suggests the younger was the son of the older. An inscription from Leptis Magna attests to the existence of a Marcus Annius Messala as legatus, or assistant, to the proconsular governor of Africa, which has led to the theory that the older Pusio adopted Annius Messala, who then added the older man's name to his own. At the same time, a Marcus Annius Messala has been attested as suffect consul in 83, who may be the person mentioned in the African inscription. Another theory proposed by scholars such as Ronald Syme explains the element "Annius Messala" as coming from the maternal side of the older Pusio's family.

Syme also notes evidence of two possible relatives in Gades: an inscription by his slave attests to one Lucius Cornelius Pusio, while another to a Marcus Cornelius L.f. Pusio.

The inscription from Tibur, created by Cornelia Sabina, a likely wife or daughter, provides notice of two offices the consul of 90 held: Pusio was a member of the Septemviri epulonum, one of the four most prestigious Roman priesthoods, responsible for arranging feasts and public banquets at festivals and games (ludi); and he was also governor of Africa, likely in the year 103/104. Lucius Cornelius Pusio is mentioned in one other inscription, the Testamentum Dasumii, indicating he was still alive in the Summer of 108.

Political offices
Preceded by Domitian XV, and Marcus Cocceius Nerva II as ordinary consuls	Suffect consul of the Roman Empire; 90 with Marcus Cocceius Nerva II	Succeeded by Lucius Antistius Rusticus, and Servius Julius Servianus as suffect consuls
