= Palazzo della Cancelleria =

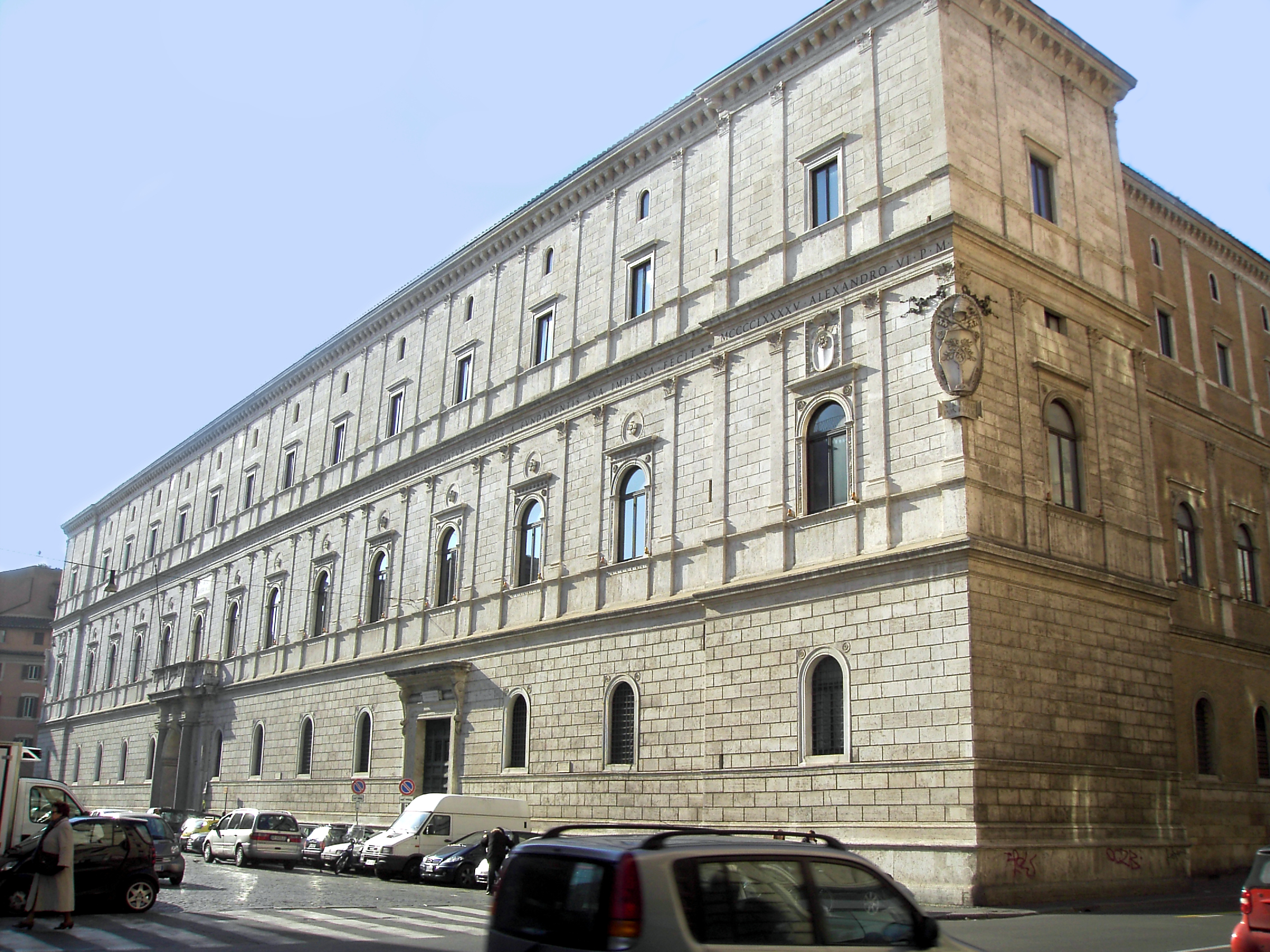
- Click on the map for a fullscreen view

General information
- Location: Rome, Italy
- Coordinates: 41°53′48.07″N 12°28′17.48″E

The Palazzo della Cancelleria (Palace of the Chancellery, referring to the former Apostolic Chancery of the Pope) is a Renaissance palace in Rome, Italy, situated between the present Corso Vittorio Emanuele II and the Campo de' Fiori, in the rione of Parione. It was built 1489–1513 by Baccio Pontelli and Antonio da Sangallo the Elder as a palace for Raffaele Cardinal Riario, Camerlengo of the Holy Roman Church, and is regarded as the earliest Renaissance palace in Rome.

The Palazzo houses the institutions of justice of the Roman Curia, is an extraterritorial property of the Holy See, and is designated as a World Heritage Site.

== History ==
The Cancelleria was built for Raffaele Cardinal Riario who held the post of Camerlengo of the Holy Roman Church to his powerful uncle, Pope Sixtus IV. The rumor was that the funds came from a single night's winnings at gaming.

In 1517, the newly completed Palazzo was seized by Pope Leo X, who suspected Cardinal Riario of plotting to assassinate him. He gifted the palace to his cousin, Cardinal Giulio de Medici (the future Pope Clement VII). Since Cardinal Giulio was the Vice-Chancellor of the Church, the palace became known as the Palazzo della Cancelleria thereafter, and was generally referred to just as the "Cancelleria".

From 1753 the vice chancellor was the Jacobite pretender to the thrones of England, Scotland, France, and Ireland, Henry Benedict Stuart, Cardinal Duke of York, the Jacobite Henry IX and I of England, Scotland, and Ireland. During the late 17th century Christina, former Queen of Sweden, resided here.

During the Roman Republic of 1849 the parliament briefly sat here.

In 2015, it was the residence of retired, and now deceased, Bernard Cardinal Law, Archbishop of Boston, United States.

== Architecture ==
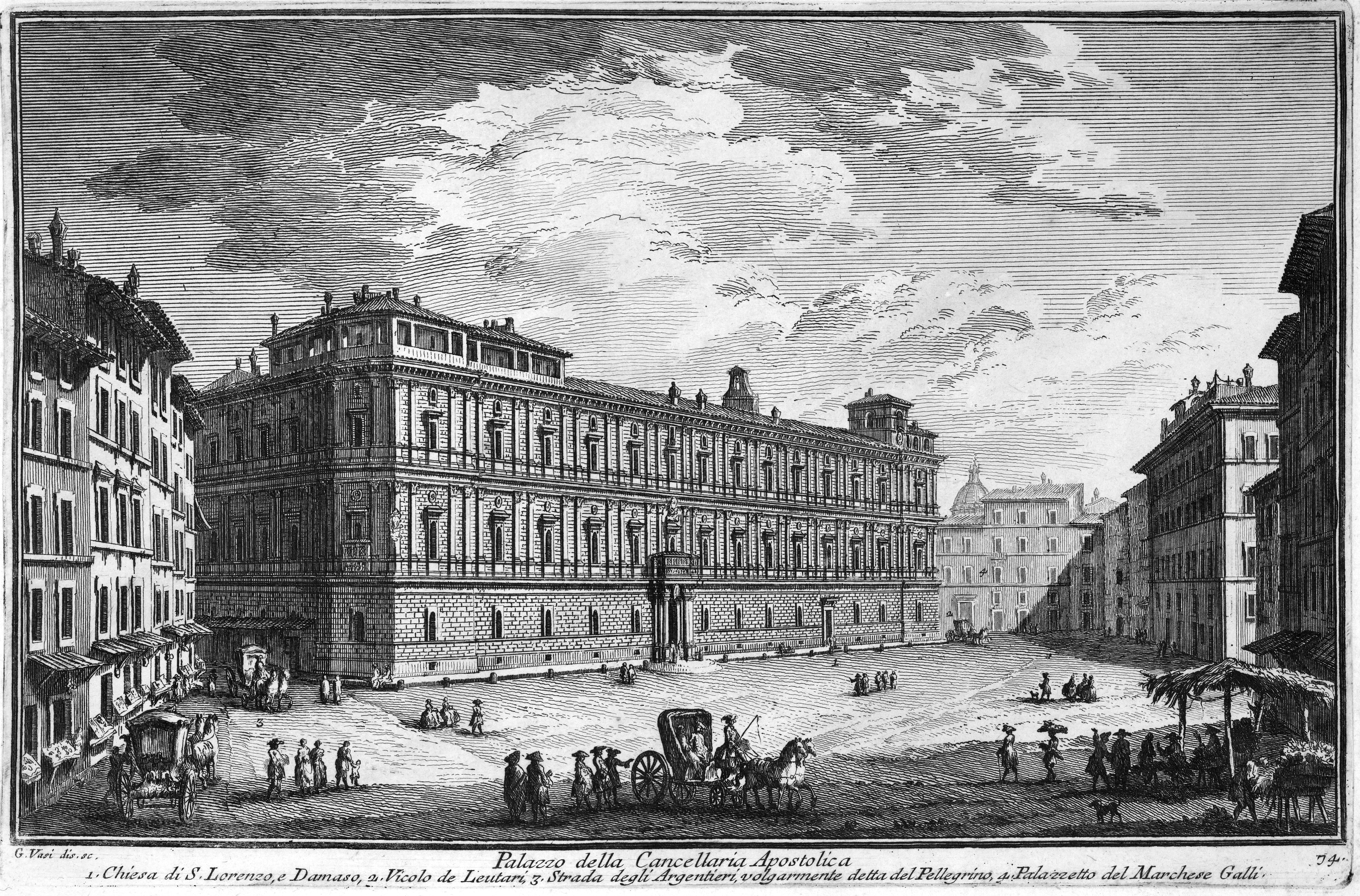
Palazzo della Cancelleria: the 18th-century engraving by Giuseppe Vasi exaggerates the depth of the Piazza della Cancelleria in front of the Palace.

The Palazzo della Cancelleria was the first palazzo in Rome to be erected from the ground up in the new Renaissance style. Its long facade engulfs the small Basilica di San Lorenzo in Damaso, the Cardinal's titular church, that is to its right, with the palatial front continuing straight across it. The entrance to the Basilica is on the right side of the facade. The 5th-century basilica (its interior has been rebuilt) sits, like the Basilica di San Clemente among others, on a pagan Roman mithraeum. Excavations beneath the cortile from 1988 to 1991 revealed the 4th- and 5th-century foundations of the grand Basilica di San Lorenzo in Damaso, founded by Pope Damasus I, and one of the most important early churches of Rome. A cemetery in use from the 8th century until shortly before the construction of the Palazzo was also identified.

The facade, with its rhythm of flat doubled pilasters between the arch-headed windows, is Florentine in conception, comparable to Leone Battista Alberti's Palazzo Rucellai. The overall pattern of drafted masonry, cut with smooth surfaces and grooves around the edges, is ancient Roman in origin.

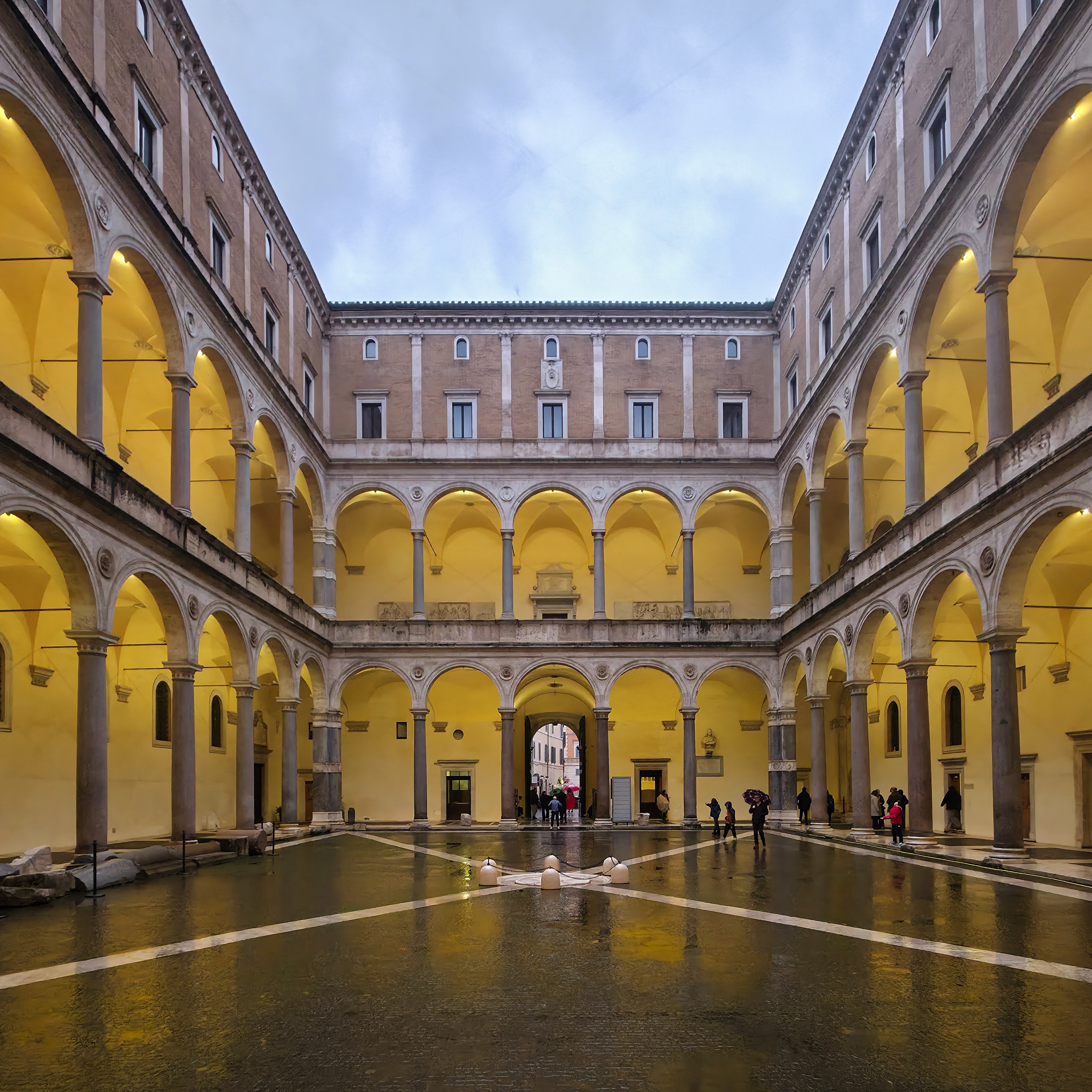
The courtyard with the original columns from the Theatre of Pompey

The bone-colored travertine of the Palazzo was spolia from the nearby ancient ruins of the Theatre of Pompey, for Rome was a field of ruins, built for a city of over one million that then housed a mere 30,000. The 44 Egyptian granite columns of the inner courtyard are from the porticoes of the theatre's upper covered seating, however they were originally taken from the theatre to build the old Basilica di San Lorenzo in Damaso. It is more probable that the form of the courtyard is derived from that of the Palazzo Ducale in Urbino, because the individuals involved in the early planning of the Palazzo had come from Urbino.

== Art ==
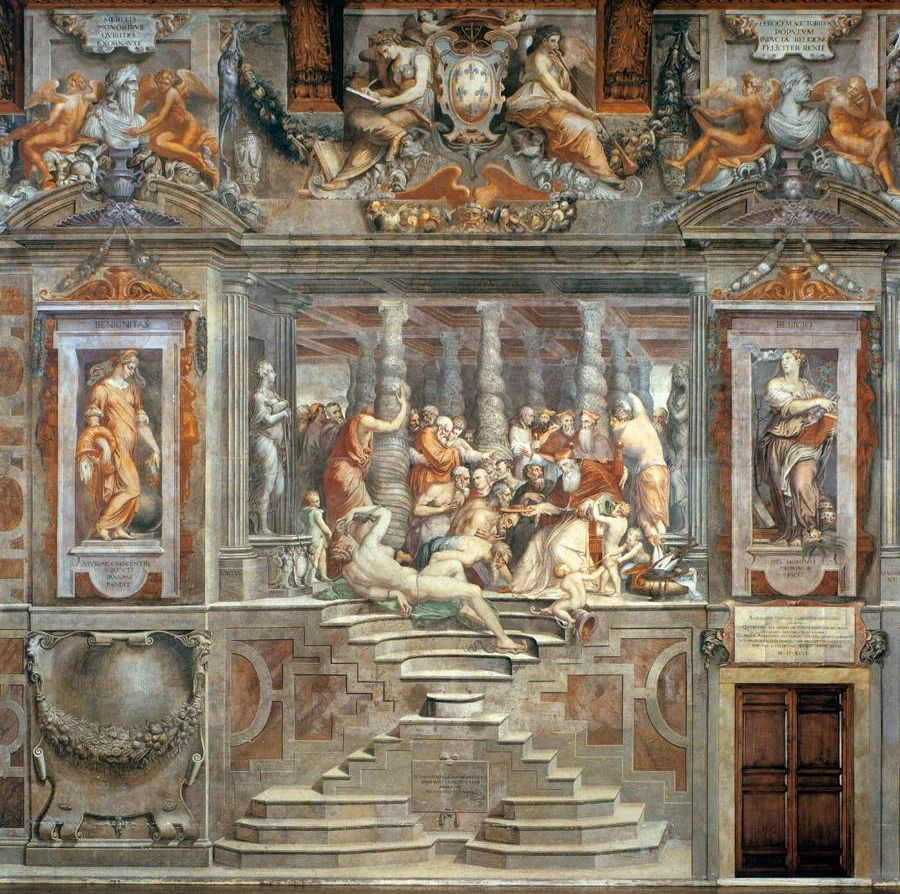
Pope Paul III (Farnese) Names Cardinals and Distributes Benefices, section of the Vasari fresco

The largest reception room, the Salone d'Onore on the piano nobile, has vast murals in fresco that Giorgio Vasari completed in a mere 100 days in 1547. The room is therefore named the Sala dei Cento Giorni ("Room of 100 Days"). He boasted of this accomplishment to Michelangelo, who responded "Si vede" ("It shows").

They were commissioned by Cardinal Alessandro Farnese, the grandson of Pope Paul III, who was Vice-Chancellor of the church for over fifty years. The reign of Paul III is depicted in the Mannerist style, and the frescoes form an impressive ensemble.

The Cancelleria Reliefs are two significant if incomplete 1st-century AD reliefs that were discovered buried at the site when the palazzo was being built. They are now in the Vatican Museums. They were apparently carved to glorify the Emperor Domitian (r. 81-96), then partly recarved to feature Nerva after his accession.

== Music ==
In the palazzo a small private theatre was installed by Cardinal Pietro Ottoboni, and in the later 17th century the Palazzo became a center of musical performance in Rome.

At the time when Cardinal Pietro Ottoboni lived there as vice-chancellor, the Palazzo della Cancelleria became an important center of the musical life of Rome. Between 1694 and 1705 several oratories by Alessandro Scarlatti and various cantatas for Christmas were performed here for the first time. In 1709 Ottoboni also had a theater built on a project by the architect Filippo Juvarra, which was removed after his death (February 28, 1740). It was in this theater that at least one gathering of the Accademia degli Arcadi was held on the occasion of Christmas 1712 to celebrate the child Jesus.

Preceded by Palazzo Borghese	Landmarks of Rome; Palazzo della Cancelleria	Succeeded by Chigi Palace
