= Cocceia gens =

Ancient Roman family

The gens Cocceia was a plebeian family at ancient Rome. Members of this gens first appear towards the end of the Republic, among them the ancestors of the emperor Nerva.

== Origin ==
According to Syme, the Cocceii came from Umbria.

== Praenomina ==
The Cocceii used the praenomina Marcus, Lucius, Sextus, and Gaius, of which Marcus was favored by the Cocceii Nervae.

== Branches and cognomina ==
The only family of the Cocceii known under the late Republic bore the cognomen Nerva. A number of personal cognomina were borne by other members of the gens, including Auctus, Balbus, Genialis, Justus, Nepos, Nigrinus, Proculus, Rufinus, and Verus.

== Members ==
This list includes abbreviated praenomina. For an explanation of this practice, see filiation.

=== Cocceii Nervae ===
- Lucius Cocceius Nerva, brought about the reconciliation of Mark Antony and Octavian in 40 BC; possibly the same person as Marcus Cocceius Nerva, consul in 36 BC.
- Marcus Cocceius Nerva, consul in 36 BC. He might be the same person as the Lucius Cocceius Nerva mentioned by Appian, and is probably the Cocceius mentioned by Horace. He cannot be the same person as the grandfather of Nerva, who died in AD 33, but the latter might have been his son.
- Marcus Cocceius (M. f.) Nerva, a noted jurist, and the grandfather of Nerva, was a close friend of Tiberius, with whom he departed Rome in AD 26. He starved himself to death in 33. He was very learned in the law, on which he wrote several books, now lost.
- Marcus Cocceius M. f. (M. n.) Nerva, father of the emperor Nerva, was a noted jurist like his father, and for this reason he is cited by the Digest as Nerva filius. He wrote a treatise on usucapio. The jurist Gaius cites a Nerva, but does not indicate whether the father or the son. This is probably the Nerva whom Tacitus mentions as praetor designatus.
- Marcus Cocceius M. f. M. n. Nerva, emperor from AD 96 to 98, rejected the violence that had become the hallmark of his predecessor, Domitian. He dealt mildly with conspirators, and adopted the general Marcus Ulpius Trajanus, the future emperor Trajan, as his heir.
- Cocceia, the emperor's sister, married Lucius Salvius Otho Titianus.

=== Others ===
- Lucius Cocceius Auctus, a prominent architect in the time of Augustus.
- Gaius Cocceius Balbus, consul suffectus in 39 BC.
- Cocceius Caesianus.
- Marcus Cocceius Genialis.
- Cocceius Julianus Synesius.
- Cocceius Justus.
- Cocceius Minicianus.
- Marcus Cocceius M. f. Nepos.
- Marcus Cocceius Nigrinus.
- Cocceius Proculus.
- Cocceius Rufinus.
- Cocceius Vennianus.
- Cocceius Verus.
- Sextus Cocceius Severianus Honorinus, consul suffectus in AD 147.
- Sextus Cocceius Vibianus.
- Marcus Cocceius Anicius Faustus Flavianus, consul suffectus around AD 250.
- Sextus Cocceius Anicius Faustus Paulinus, consul suffectus around AD 260.
- Marcus Cocceius Sex. f. Anicius Faustus Flavianus.

== See also ==
- List of Roman gentes

== Bibliography ==
=== Ancient sources ===
- Appianus Alexandrinus (Appian), Bellum Civile (The Civil War).
- Sextus Aurelius Victor (attributed), Epitome de Caesaribus.
- Lucius Cassius Dio, Roman History.
- Publius Cornelius Tacitus, Annales.
- Digesta, or Pandectae (The Digest).
- Quintus Horatius Flaccus (Horace), Satirae (Satires).
- Sextus Julius Frontinus, De Aquaeductu (On Aqueducts).

=== Modern sources ===
- Dictionary of Greek and Roman Biography and Mythology, William Smith, ed., Little, Brown and Company, Boston (1849).
- August Pauly, Georg Wissowa, et alii, Realencyclopädie der Classischen Altertumswissenschaft (Scientific Encyclopedia of the Knowledge of Classical Antiquities, abbreviated RE or PW), J. B. Metzler, Stuttgart (1894–1980).
- Ronald Syme, The Roman Revolution, Oxford University Press (1939).
