= Marcus Cocceius Nerva =

Marcus Cocceius Nerva may refer to:

- Marcus Cocceius Nerva (consul 36 BC), great-grandfather of the Roman emperor
- Marcus Cocceius Nerva (jurist), grandfather of the Roman emperor
- Marcus Cocceius Nerva, consul suffectus in 40 AD, father of the Roman emperor
- Nerva, Roman emperor from 96 to 98
