= Statue of Nerva =

Sculpture in Rome, Italy

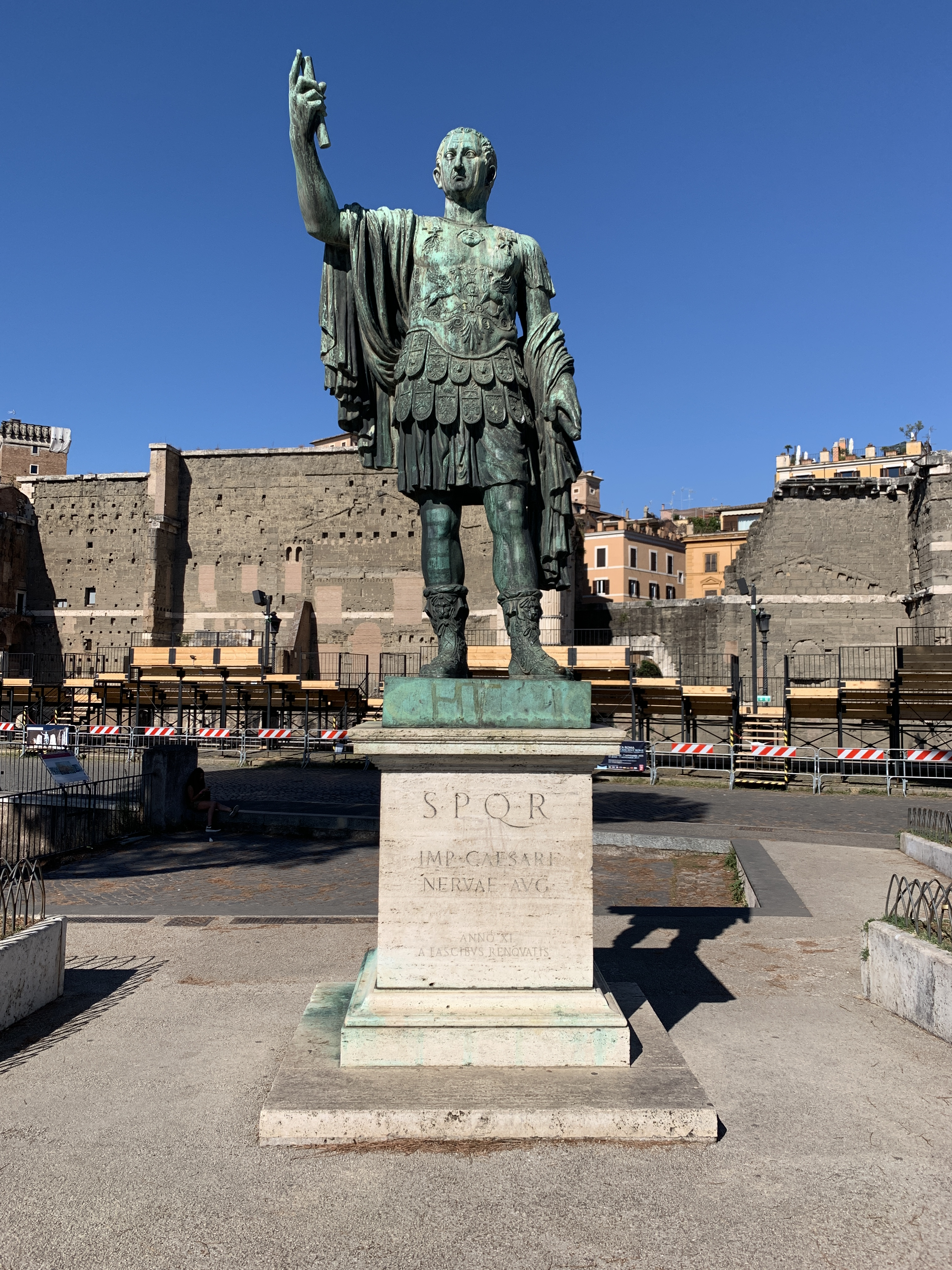
- The statue in 2021
- Subject: Nerva
- Location: Rome, Italy

A statue of Nerva is installed along Via dei Fori Imperiali in Rome, Italy.
