= Bellicia gens =

Ancient Roman family

The gens Bellicia was an aristocratic plebeian family at ancient Rome, which flourished during the first and second centuries. The Bellicii rose to prominence from Gallia Narbonensis, attaining senatorial status with Gaius Bellicius Natalis, who was appointed consul suffectus in AD 68.

== Origin ==
The nomen Bellicius, spelt Vellicius in several inscriptions of Lucius Bellicius Sollers, belongs to a class of gentilicia formed from cognomina ending in -icus. The root, Bellicus, means "fierce" or "warlike", being one of an abundant type of surname originally derived from the character of the bearer.

== Branches and cognomina ==
The earliest Bellicii appearing in history bore the cognomen Natalis, a Latin adjective referring to the circumstances of one's birth or nativity, although the circumstance through which this became their surname is unknown. Sollers, belonging to a soldier of the early second century, denoted someone thought particularly skilled or clever. The names of subsequent generations of this family probably indicate their descent from other distinguished families of the era, as well as several illustrious families of the Republic. Of particular note are Flaccus, a common surname originally bestowed on someone with large or floppy ears, borne by prominent branches of the Fulvii and Valerii, and Torquatus, famous from the Manlia gens, who acquired it as the result of a legendary combat between Titus Manlius Imperiosus and a giant Gaul, whose torque Manlius claimed as a token of his victory. The surname was borne for centuries by the Manlii, and later by a branch of the Junii who were descended from them.

== Members ==
This list includes abbreviated praenomina. For an explanation of this practice, see filiation.

- Gaius Bellicius Natalis, consul suffectus in AD 68.
- Gaius Bellicius C. f. Natalis Gavidius Tebanianus, son of Gaius Bellicius Natalis, the consul of 68, was consul suffectus in AD 87, serving from the Kalends of May to the Kalends of September.
- Tiberius Claudius Tib. f. Augustanus Lucius Bellicius Sollers, a distinguished soldier, had been prefect of the ala Gallica, military tribune with the Legio II Augusta, and prefect of a cohors of the Praetorian Guard, and had been awarded dona militaria for service in Germany. Later adlected into the Senate, advanced to praetor, and consul suffectus prior to AD 118.
- Bellicius Tebanianus, consul suffectus in AD 118.
- Gaius Bellicius C. f. C. n. Flaccus Torquatus Tebanianus, son of Gaius Bellicius Tebanianus, the consul of 87, was consul suffectus in AD 124.
- Gaius Bellicius C. f. C. n. Flaccus Torquatus, son of Gaius Bellicius Flaccus Tebanianus, the consul of 124, was consul in AD 143.
- Gaius Bellicius C. f. C. n. Calpurnius Torquatus, the son of Tebanianus, and brother of Flaccus Torquatus, the consul of 143, was consul in AD 148.

== See also ==
- List of Roman gentes

== Bibliography ==
- Titus Livius (Livy), History of Rome.
- Gaius Plinius Caecilius Secundus (Pliny the Younger), Epistulae (Letters).
- Theodor Mommsen et alii, Corpus Inscriptionum Latinarum (The Body of Latin Inscriptions, abbreviated CIL), Berlin-Brandenburgische Akademie der Wissenschaften (1853–present).
- René Cagnat et alii, L'Année épigraphique (The Year in Epigraphy, abbreviated AE), Presses Universitaires de France (1888–present).
- George Davis Chase, "The Origin of Roman Praenomina", in Harvard Studies in Classical Philology, vol. VIII, pp. 103–184 (1897).
- James H. Oliver, "The Senatorial but Not Imperial Relatives of Calpurnia Arria", in American Journal of Archaeology, vol. 55 (1951).
- Paul A. Gallivan, "Some Comments on the Fasti for the Reign of Nero", in Classical Quarterly, vol. 24, pp. 290–311 (1974); "The Fasti for A.D. 70–96", in Classical Quarterly, vol. 31, pp. 186–220 (1981).
- John C. Traupman, The New College Latin & English Dictionary, Bantam Books, New York (1995).
