= Sextus Cocceius Severianus =

2nd century Roman senator

Sextus Cocceius Severianus was a Roman senator who flourished during the reign of Antoninus Pius. An unpublished military diploma attests that he was governor of Roman Arabia on 12 August 145; Severianus was promoted to suffect consul in 147, with first Tiberius Licinius Cassius Cassianus then Gaius Popilius Carus Pedo as his colleague. Between 161 and 163 he was Proconsul of Africa.

He married Caesonia; their known children include a son, Sextus Cocceius Severianus; Sextus Cocceius Vibianus (flourished c. 204), is a known grandson.

== See also ==
- Cocceia gens

Political offices
Preceded by Cupressenus Gallus, and Quintus Cornelius Quadratus as suffect consuls	Suffect consul of the Roman Empire; 147 with Tiberius Licinius Cassius Cassianus, followed by Gaius Popilius Carus Pedo	Succeeded by Lucius Octavius Cornelius Publius Salvius Julianus Aemilianus, and Gaius Bellicius Calpurnius Torquatus as ordinary consuls
