= Nervo =

Nervo may refer to:

== People ==
- Amado Nervo (1870–1919), Mexican poet
- Carlo Nervo (born 1971), Italian professional footballer
- Hugo Nervo (born 1991), Argentine football defender
- Jacques de Nervo (1897–1990), French industrialist
- Jimmy Nervo, one half of British comedy duo Nervo and Knox
- Luis Padilla Nervo (1894–1985), Mexican politician and diplomat
- Nervo (DJs), Australian DJs Olivia Nervo and Miriam Nervo
- Robert de Nervo (1842–1909), French industrialist

== Other ==
- Nervo (crater), a crater on the planet Mercury
- Mount Nervo, mountain in Antarctica

== See also ==
- Nerva (disambiguation)
- Nervi (disambiguation)
