= Plotius Pegasus =

1st-century Roman senator and jurist

- Occupation(s): Roman senator and jurisconsult
- Office: Consul; Praefectus urbi

(Lucius?) Plotius Pegasus was a Roman senator and jurisconsult active under the Flavian dynasty. He was suffect consul in an uncertain year, most likely 72 or 73, as the colleague of Lucius Cornelius Pusio Annius Messalla. Shortly after his ascension to the imperial throne, Domitian appointed Pegasus urban prefect, one of the most prestigious offices in a senatorial career.

== Family ==
According to a scholiast on Juvenal, Pegasus and his brother Plotius Griphus were named by their father after ships he commanded as a trierarch, or naval commander. Professor Edward Champlin of Princeton University provides evidence to show that ships of the imperial fleet were often named after swift and powerful winged beasts. He makes the suggestion that their father should be identified with a "M.Plotius Paulus qui et Zosimus", whose tombstone was recovered at Rome. An inscription from Dalmatia mentions him, but it is broken where it contains his name: [...]tius Pegasus. Champlin makes a convincing argument that the best restoration for his gentilicium is Plotius, the same as his brother.

There are some possible descendants of Pegasus or his brother. The cognomen of Lucius Plotius P[...], proconsul of Cyprus in 81/82, has been argued to be Pegasus, and thus the proconsul is very likely his son, although Ronald Syme has argued that the cognomen is actually Pulcher and is an otherwise unknown member of the Plautii Silvani.

== Life ==
Prior to the Year of Four Emperors, Pegasus' life is unknown. Brian Jones, author of The Emperor Domitian, writes, "At all events, he and his brother were committed Flavians at the right time and, despite their comparatively humble background and possibly eastern origin, were amply rewarded." The scholiast to Juvenal states that Pegasus was governor of several provinces, but the only one we have evidence for is Dalmatia from the year 70 to 73. One of the military tribunes of the Legio IV Flavia stationed in Dalmatia at the time was Gaius Petillius Firmus, the younger son of Quintus Petillius Cerialis; since governors often appointed relatives to hold the commission of one of the military tribunes in their province, this has led some to speculate that Pegasus is somehow related to the young Firmus.

Juvenal notes in his Fourth Satire that Pegasus was so honest that people were astonished when they learned he was selected as Urban prefect. However, the date he took office and how long he held it is uncertain. The Fourth Satire is set at the beginning of Domitian's reign, a dramatic date between mid-September 81 and Spring of 83. Pegasus' ethical reputation suggests he would not willingly have taken part in Domitian's notorious proscriptions against Senators that started in the year 91. Lastly, a number of personages were appointed Urban Prefect between the years 81 and 91 who must also be accommodated in that decade, including Marcus Arrecinus Clemens, Gaius Rutilius Gallicus, and Titus Aurelius Fulvus, listing them in the order Jones suggests they held the office. Champlin suggests "his absence from the voluminous extant works of Statius, Martial, and the younger Pliny (who was certainly familiar with all of the leading jurists of the day) suggests that he may have died not long after leaving office."

== As a jurisconsult ==
During his lifetime, Pegasus was considered "a iuris peritus of glorious memory, a walking encyclopaedia". He succeeded the namesake as head of the Proculian school of law. Jones speculates his suffect consulship followed soon after Nerva's, whose father and grandfather were also leading Proculians. Despite this reputation while he was alive, "not a single word of his writings survives. Indeed, but for notices in the Digest and in Juvenal and his scholiast, he would have been quite forgotten." The Senatus Consultum Pegasianum, which addressed difficulties concerning inheritances not covered by the Senatus Consultum Trebellianum, was named for Pegasus.

== Sources ==
- Birley, Anthony (1981). The Fasti of Roman Britain. Oxford: Clarendon Press. ISBN 0198148216.
- Bosworth, A. B. (1980). "Firmus of Arretium". Zeitschrift für Papyrologie und Epigraphik. 39: 267–277. JSTOR 20185921.
- Champlin, Edward (1978). "Pegasus". Zeitschrift für Papyrologie und Epigraphik. 32: 269–278. JSTOR 20185579.
- Eck, Werner (1982). "Jahres- und Provinzialfasten der senatorischen Statthalter von 69/70 bis 138/139". Chiron. 12: 281–362.
- Gallivan, Paul (1981). "The Fasti for A. D. 70–96". Classical Quarterly. 31 (1): 186–220. doi:10.1017/S0009838800021194. JSTOR 638472.
- Jones, Brian W. (1993). The Emperor Domitian. Taylor & Francis. ISBN 0415101956.
- Talbert, Richard (1984). The Senate of Imperial Rome. Princeton University Press. ISBN 0691054002.
