= Sextus Cocceius Vibianus =

Sextus Cocceius Vibianus was a Roman Senator in 204. He was the son of Sextus Cocceius Severianus and Caesonia. He was also the grandson of Sextus Cocceius Severianus, Proconsul of Africa.

He married and had a daughter, who married Quintus Anicius Faustus Paulinus (born c. 180), Legate of Moesia Inferior between 229 and 230 or c. 230 to 232, and had issue.

== Sources ==
- Christian Settipani, Les Ancêtres de Charlemagne (France: Éditions Christian, 1989).
- Christian Settipani, Continuite Gentilice et Continuite Familiale Dans Les Familles Senatoriales Romaines, A L'Epoque Imperiale, Mythe et Realite. Linacre, UK: Prosopographica et Genealogica, 2000. ILL. NYPL ASY (Rome) 03-983.
- Anthony Wagner, Pedigree and Progress, Essays in the Genealogical Interpretation of History, London, Philmore, 1975. Rutgers Alex CS4.W33.

== See also ==
- Cocceia gens
