= Lucius Gellius Poplicola =

Roman politician

- Born: Valerius Messalla
- Died: c. 31 BC
- Office: Consul (36 BC)
- Relatives: Marcus Valerius Messalla Corvinus (brother)

Lucius Gellius Poplicola or Publicola (fl. 43–31 BC) was a Roman senator who led a checkered political career during the civil wars of the late Republic. Initially a supporter of Julius Caesar's assassins, Brutus and Cassius, he defected to the Second Triumvirate and was later rewarded with a consulship in 36 BC. Gellius fought for Mark Antony against Octavian at the Battle of Actium in 31 BC, after which he disappears from history.

== Biography ==
Lucius Gellius is apparently mentioned in a letter by Lucius Munatius Plancus to Cicero, where he is praised as a good republican who had mediated between Plancus and Lepidus. After the republican party collapsed in Italy following the war of Mutina, Gellius fled east to join Julius Caesar's assassins, Brutus and Cassius. Here he was detected plotting to take the life of Brutus but was pardoned at the intercession of his brother, Marcus Valerius Messalla Corvinus. Shortly afterwards he entered into a conspiracy to kill Cassius, but again escaped unpunished through the intercession of his mother Palla.

Gellius changed sides and joined the triumvirs, Octavian and Mark Antony. While serving under Antony in the east c. 41 BC he had coins struck, on which he appears with the title of Q. P., probably Quaestor Propraetore. He was elected as one of the consuls for 36 BC. In the war between Octavian and Antony, he supported Antony, and commanded the right wing of Antony's fleet at the Battle of Actium. As he is not mentioned again in any known historical texts, it can be assumed that he most likely perished in the battle or in the war.

== Family ==
Lucius Gellius Poplicola is identified in the sources as a brother of Marcus Valerius Messalla Corvinus, and their mother was called Palla. Münzer and Evans supposed that they were half-brothers, and identified Gellius Poplicola's father as Lucius Gellius, consul in 72 BC. Badian preferred to see them as full brothers, sons of a Valerius Messalla who, in keeping with a trend of the time, gave distinguished ancestral surnames (Poplicola and Corvinus) of the Valerii to both his sons. Gellius Poplicola will then have been adopted by Lucius Gellius, consul of 72 BC, explaining his distinct name.

Gellius Poplicola married one Sempronia, sister of Lucius Atratinus.

Gellius Poplicola is generally identified with the Gellius attacked in a series of lampoons by Catullus (poems 74, 78, 80, 88, 89, 90, 91, and 116), who seems to have been a rival for the favours of Clodia (wife of Metellus) who has been identified in turn with Catullus's Lesbia.

== Endnotes ==
Political offices
Preceded by M. Agrippa; T. Statilius Taurus	Roman consul January–August 36 BC; With: Marcus Cocceius Nerva	Succeeded by L. Nonius Asprenas
