= Anicius Faustus Paulinus (suffect consul) =

3rd century Roman military officer and senator

Quintus Anicius Faustus Paulinus (or possibly Sextus Anicius Faustus Paulinus) (fl. 3rd century AD) was a Roman military officer and senator who was appointed suffect consul sometime before AD 230.

== Biography ==
Probably the son of Quintus Anicius Faustus, suffect consul in AD 198, and a member of the third century gens Anicia, Faustus Paulinus was appointed Legatus Augusti pro praetore (or imperial governor) of the province of Moesia Inferior in around AD 229/230. As this posting was consular in rank, it is therefore assumed that sometime prior to AD 230, he had been appointed suffect consul.

It is speculated that Faustus Paulinus either married a daughter of Sextus Cocceius Vibianus, consul suffectus sometime during the late 2nd or early 3rd century AD, or that he was the brother-in-law to a son of Sextus Cocceius Vibianus. He may therefore have been the father (or perhaps uncle) of Marcus Cocceius Anicius Faustus Flavianus, suffect consul c. AD 250/252, and Sextus Cocceius Anicius Faustus Paulinus, suffect consul prior to AD 268.

== Sources ==
- Mennen, Inge, Power and Status in the Roman Empire, AD 193-284 (2011)

Political offices
Preceded by Uncertain	Consul suffectus of the Roman Empire before AD 230	Succeeded by Uncertain
