= Cancelleria Reliefs =

Two incomplete Roman bas-reliefs

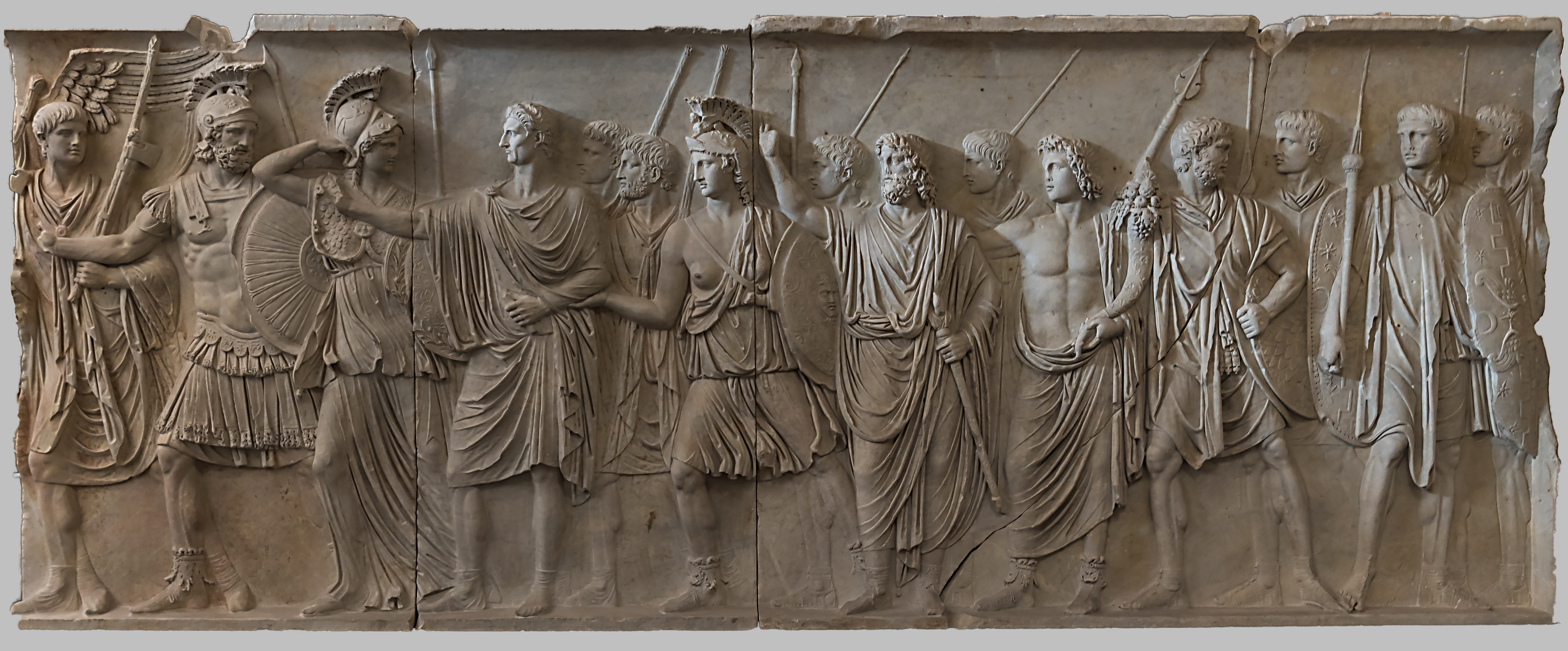
Panel A

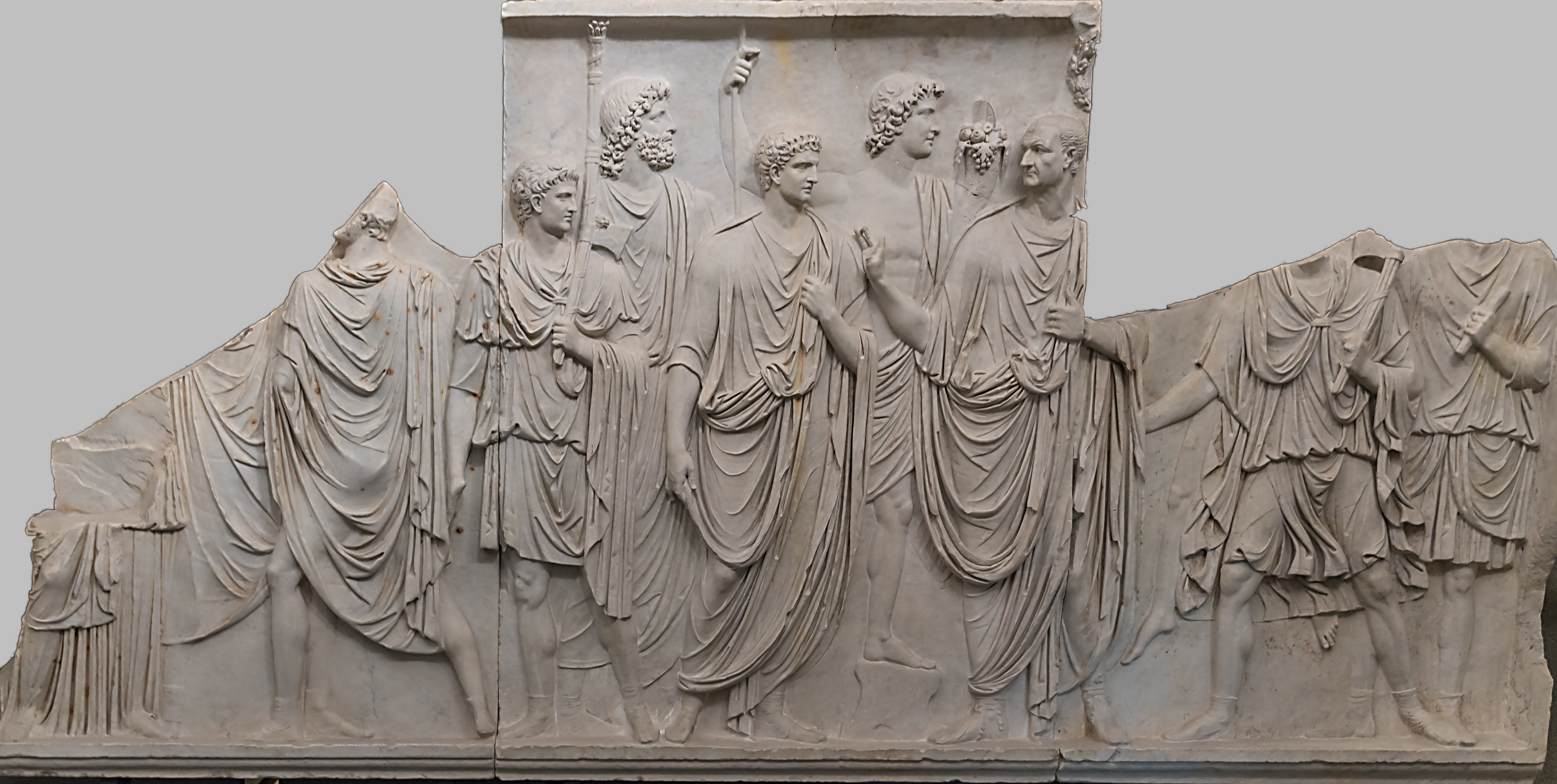
Panel B

The Cancelleria Reliefs are a set of two incomplete bas-reliefs, believed to have been commissioned by the Roman Emperor Domitian (81–96 AD). The reliefs originally depicted events from the life and reign of Domitian, but were partially recarved following the accession of Emperor Nerva. They are now in the Vatican Museums.

The two panels, commonly referred to as Frieze A and Frieze B, were found incomplete. Frieze A survived relatively intact, but is missing a part of the left end, making it difficult to assess the exact length of the original work. Frieze B contains various broken panels, and is thought to have spanned a width of nearly 597 cm. Both reliefs measure 210 cm in height.

== History ==
The Cancelleria Reliefs were discovered under the Palazzo della Cancelleria in Rome in the late 1930s, and owe this name to their place of finding. It is not known who sculpted these works or which building they were intended to adorn, but it is believed the entire work was executed by the same man, on a commission by the Roman Emperor Domitian. They are now in the Vatican Museums in Rome.

A number of cautious suggestions have been put forth as to the original location of the Cancelleria Reliefs. Most likely, the sculptures decorated one of the numerous buildings erected under Domitian. Brian Jones suggests two possible locations: the Templum Divorum, which was a shrine dedicated to the military triumphs of Vespasian and Titus, or one of multiple arches which were said to have been erected under Domitian, but were torn down following his death.

== Description ==
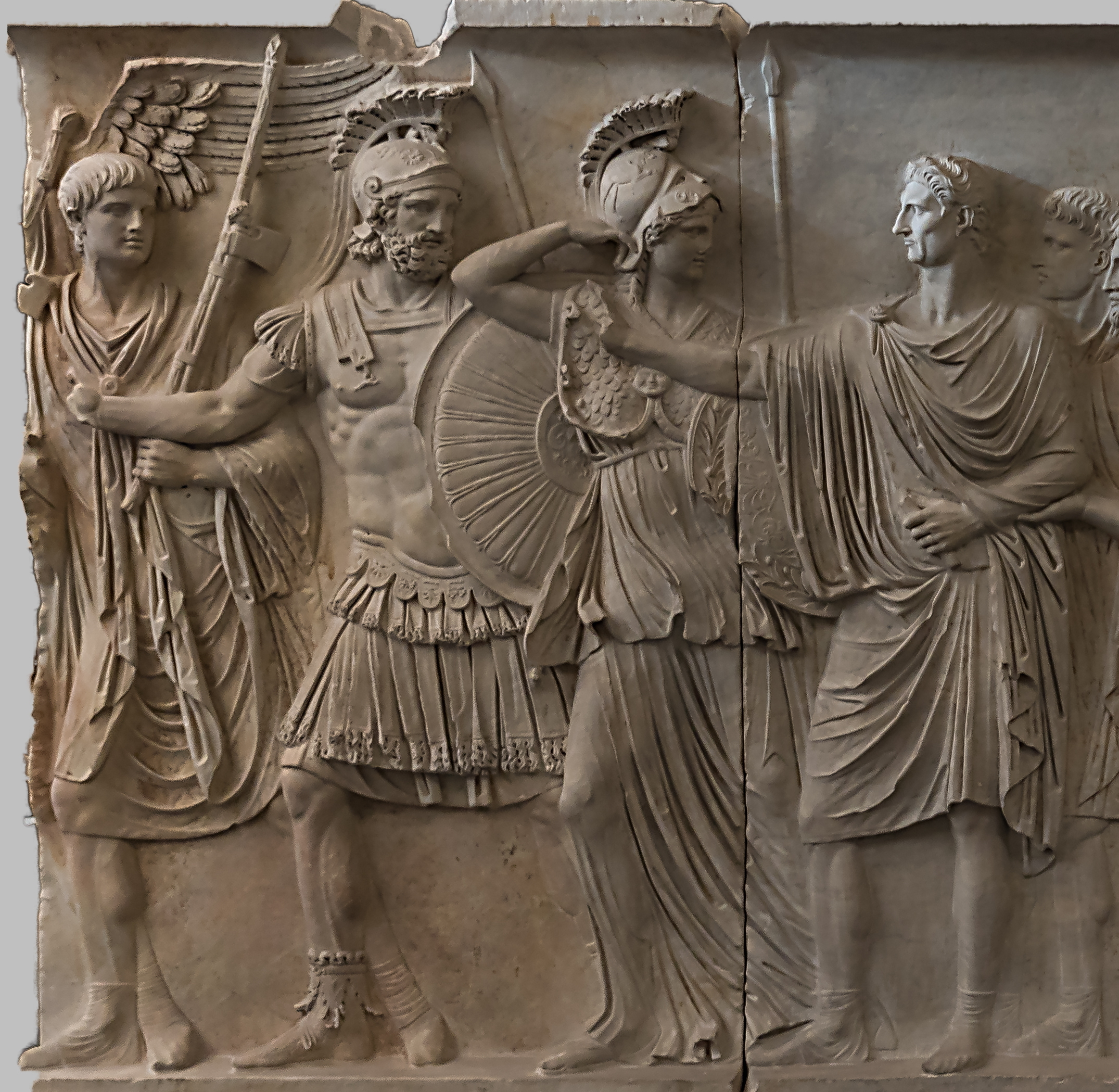
Detail: left end of Panel A. Mars, Minerva and Roma urge the emperor (Domitian/Nerva) to action.

=== Purpose and style ===
The Cancelleria Reliefs depict events from the life of Domitian and the history of the Flavian dynasty, which was founded by Domitian's father Vespasian in 69 AD. The content of the works has dated their creation to at least 83. As a source of historical information, the reliefs are thought to have been part of a propaganda effort to legitimize the rule of the Flavian dynasty.

The style of the works has imposed some difficulties on their correct dating, however. Whereas similar bas-reliefs which can be dated to the reign of Domitian with certainty, such as from the Arch of Titus, feature a more mannered, Baroque style of sculpture, the Cancelleria Reliefs seem to have been carved in the Classical style of the Augustan period.

=== Frieze A ===
Frieze A originally depicted Domitian as he prepared to depart for a campaign against the Chatti. Contemporary authors such as Suetonius later alleged that Domitian's military endeavours were largely a failure, motivated by a quest for personal glory rather than necessity. The scene depicted on Frieze A seems to counter such accusations by presenting Domitian as a reluctant general, spurred on by the gods Mars, Minerva and Roma, who are pictured on the far left, to defend his home country. Other characters who appear in this scene are the Genii, or guardian spirits, of the Roman Senate and the people of Rome, and a number of soldiers.

Following his assassination on September 18, 96 however, the Senate passed damnatio memoriae on Domitian's memory—his name was erased from all public records and his statues and arches were destroyed. Some of his statues were resculpted to depict the new emperor Nerva, among which was Frieze A of the Cancelleria Reliefs. Nerva's head is markedly out of proportion with his body. His right eye is smaller than his left, and his neck is too long, clearly suggesting the head was carved out of an earlier model for Domitian.

=== Frieze B ===
Frieze B depicts Vespasian's reconciliation with Domitian following the civil war, in 69. After the death of emperor Nero in 68, war erupted among the four most influential generals in the Roman Empire—Galba, Otho, Vitellius and Vespasian. After Galba and Otho had perished in quick succession, Vitellius' claim to the throne was challenged by Vespasian. Vespasian was at the time conducting the siege of the city of Jerusalem in Judaea. Rather than heading back to Rome however, he entrusted the war against Vitellius to his political ally Gaius Licinius Mucianus, while Vespasian himself gathered support in the province of Egypt.

Mucianus invaded Rome on 20 December 69, and quickly defeated the forces of Vitellius. An interim administration was installed with Mucianus as acting emperor, and Domitian as representative of the Flavian family. Vespasian returned to Rome in late September 70, which is the scene historians believe to be depicted on Frieze B. The composition of the characters, with Domitian on the left, and Vespasian on the right, suggests that Domitian assures his father that Rome has been governed well in his absence, and that their relations are good.

Once again, ancient authors paint a different picture of the events presented in the Cancelleria Reliefs. According to both Tacitus and Suetonius, Domitian's conduct during Mucianus' interim government was less than satisfactory; they allege he was over-zealous in distributing political offices, and eager to partake in unwarranted military campaigns. The chief motivation for Vespasian's return then, was the need to restrain Domitian. The literary evidence of this time must be treated with caution however, as Tacitus is known to have been heavily biased against Domitian. If, on the other hand, the Cancelleria Reliefs were indeed propaganda, they may have been intended to dispel popular rumours regarding the future emperor's conduct. Either interpretation cannot be established with certainty, although Jones favours a straightforward account in which Vespasian's reconciliation with Domitian was indeed amicable.

== See also ==
- Ara Pacis
- Trajan's Column
