= Gaius Bellicius Calpurnius Torquatus =

2nd century Roman senator and consul

Gaius Bellicius Calpurnius Torquatus was a Roman senator during the reign of Antoninus Pius. He was consul posterior in 148 as the colleague of Lucius Octavius Cornelius Publius Salvius Julianus Aemilianus. Calpurnius Torquatus was the son of Gaius Bellicius Flaccus Torquatus Tebanianus, consul of 124, and the younger brother of Gaius Bellicius Flaccus Torquatus, consul of 143.

Subsequent to his consulate, Calpurnius Torquatus was patron of the Roman town of Vienne in Gaul.

== See also ==
- Bellicia gens

Political offices
Preceded by Sextus Cocceius Severianus Honorinus, and Gaius Popilius Carus Pedo as suffect consuls	Consul of the Roman Empire; AD 148 with Lucius Octavius Cornelius Publius Salvius Julianus Aemilianus	Succeeded by Satyrius Firmus, and Gaius Salvius Capito as suffect consuls
