= Marcus Cocceius Anicius Faustus Flavianus =

3rd century BCE Roman senator

Marcus Cocceius Anicius Faustus Flavianus (fl. 3rd century AD) was a Roman senator who was appointed suffect consul sometime around AD 250/252.

Probably either the son or nephew of Anicius Faustus Paulinus, suffect consul before AD 230, Faustus Flavianus was a member of the Patrician 3rd century gens Anicia. Faustus Flavianus was appointed Curator rei publicae Cirtae (or curator of the city of Cirta) in AD 251. It is believed that sometime around this time, c. AD 250/252, he was appointed suffect consul.

It is speculated that Faustus Flavianus was the brother of Sextus Cocceius Anicius Faustus Paulinus, suffect consul prior to AD 268.

== Sources ==
- Mennen, Inge, Power and Status in the Roman Empire, AD 193-284 (2011)

Political offices
Preceded by Uncertain	Consul suffectus of the Roman Empire around AD 250/252	Succeeded by Uncertain
