= Popilius Pedo Apronianus =

Roman senator (died 205)

Popilius Pedo Apronianus (died 205) was a Roman senator, who was active during the reign of Septimius Severus. He was Roman consul in the year 191 with Marcus Valerius Bradua Mauricus as his colleague.

A member of the Patrician order, Apronianus has been identified as the grandson of Gaius Popilius Carus Pedo, suffect consul in 147.

Apronianus is known to have been proconsular governor of Asia. While proconsul he was murdered on specious grounds: according to Cassius Dio, Arponianus' nurse reported having a dream where he had been engarbed as emperor, and it was believed Apronianus had practiced magic to achieve this. Paul Leunissen dates his tenure as proconsul to either 204/205 or 205/206. Ségolène Demougin suggests Apronianus' fatal end was connected with the fall from power of Gaius Fulvius Plautianus, who was executed on 22 January 205; since proconsuls assumed their posts in the summer months, this would date his tenure to 204/205, and mean the procurator Aelius Aglaus served as interim governor until a successor could arrive in the province.

Political offices
| Preceded by Lucius Septimius Severus, and Apuleius Rufinus, then unknown as suffect consuls | Ordinary consul of the Roman Empire; 191 with Marcus Valerius Bradua Mauricus | Succeeded by unknown, then Commodus VII, and Pertinax II as ordinary consuls |
