= Nervi (disambiguation) =

Nervi is a district of Genoa, Italy

Nervi may also refer to:

- Mauro Nervi (born 1959), an Italian poet in the Esperanto language
- Pier Luigi Nervi (1891–1979), an Italian engineer and architect

== See also ==
- Nerva (disambiguation)
- Nervii, a Celtic or Germanic tribe of Roman times.
- Nervo (disambiguation)
