= Gaius Bellicius Flaccus Torquatus Tebanianus =

2nd century Roman senator and consul

Gaius Bellicius Flaccus Torquatus Tebanianus was a Roman senator during the reign of Hadrian. He was consul posterior in 124 with Manius Acilius Glabrio as his colleague.

The Bellicii were a family who had their origins in Vienne in Gaul. Torquatus Tebanianus was the son of Gaius Bellicius Natalis Gavidius Tebanianus, suffect consul of AD 87, and Calpurnia Arria, the daughter of Lucius Nonius Calpurnius Torquatus Asprenas, suffect consul for some nundinium between 72 and 74. He had two sons, who both achieved the honor of ordinary consuls: Gaius Bellicius Flaccus Torquatus, consul of 143; and Gaius Bellicius Calpurnius Torquatus, consul of 148.

Political offices
Preceded by Titus Salvius Rufinus Minicius Opimianus, and Gnaeus Sentius Aburnianus as suffect consuls	Suffect consul of the Roman Empire; AD 124 with Manius Acilius Glabrio	Succeeded by Aulus Larcius Macedo, and Publius Ducenius Verres as suffect consuls
