= Gaius Popilius Carus Pedo =

2nd century Roman senator and consul

Gaius Popilius Carus Pedo was a Roman senator who held several offices in the emperor's service during the second century. He was suffect consul in succession to Tiberius Licinius Cassius Cassianus as colleague of Sextus Cocceius Severianus Honorinus until the end of 147.

His cognomen has been interpreted as indicating that Carus Pedo originated in one of the Western provinces of the Empire, although some experts favor an Italian origin. Ronald Syme counted 21 examples of the cognomen "Pedo" in the region of the western Alps, although his membership in the tribe "Quirina" precludes Gallia Narbonensis; however, Syme also counted 16 examples of the gentilicium Popilius in the Spanish provinces.

A number of scholars, including Syme, have suggested that Carus Pedo is related to Marcus Pedo Vergilianus, suffect consul in 115, based on sharing their uncommon name element; however as Carus Pedo's father's praenomen is known to be "Gaius", if they are related, this Pedo would be a nephew or cousin of the consul of 115. On the other hand, experts consider Carus Pedo the grandfather of Popilius Pedo Apronianus, ordinary consul in 191.

== Life ==
Pedo's cursus honorum is documented in an inscription from Tibur. He started his senatorial career likely in his teens as a member of the decemviri stlitibus iudicandis, one of the four boards of the vigintiviri, a minor collegium young senators serve in at the start of their careers. Next he was a military tribune in Legio III Cyrenaica around 132–135, which was stationed in Syria at the time; while holding this commission he received dona militaria or military decorations. This was followed by holding in succession the traditional series of republican magistracies, all as candidate of the emperor: quaestor, plebeian tribune, and at last praetor. At this point Pedo was appointed legatus legionis or commander of Legio X Fretensis around AD 141, but he rejected the post for unknown reasons. "There is a view that he did so because of bad health," writes Edward Dabrowa. Nevertheless, "the refusal did not affect his further career."

Carus Pedo held two civilian administrative posts prior to his consulship. The first was as curator of three important roads: the Via Aurelia, both the older and new sections, the Via Cornelia and the Via Triumphalis. His next post was prefect of the aerarium Saturni, which Mireille Corbier dates to 144–146. Following his consulship, Pedo was admitted to the collegium of the Septemviri epulonum; Dabrowa estimates this happened between the years 147 and 152. Also after his consulship Pedo was appointed curator of the operum publicorum, one of the overseers of the public works of Rome; an inscription attests he was curator on 19 September 150. Then he was appointed governor of Germania Superior from circa 151 to circa 155. Upon returning to Rome, Pedo was admitted to another priesthood, the sodales Hadrianales, circa 159/160. In 161/162 Pedo was appointed governor and censor over Gallia Lugdunensis, and upon returning to Rome the sortition immediately allotted to him Asia, over which he was again proconsular governor 162/163.

His life after his governorship of Asia is unknown, as well as the date of his death.

Political offices
Preceded by Sextus Cocceius Severianus, and Tiberius Licinius Cassius Cassianus as suffect consuls	Suffect consul of the Roman Empire; 147 with Sextus Cocceius Severianus	Succeeded by Lucius Octavius Cornelius Publius Salvius Julianus Aemilianus, and Gaius Bellicius Calpurnius Torquatus as ordinary consuls
