= Lucius Cornelius Pusio Annius Messalla =

1st century AD Roman senator and official

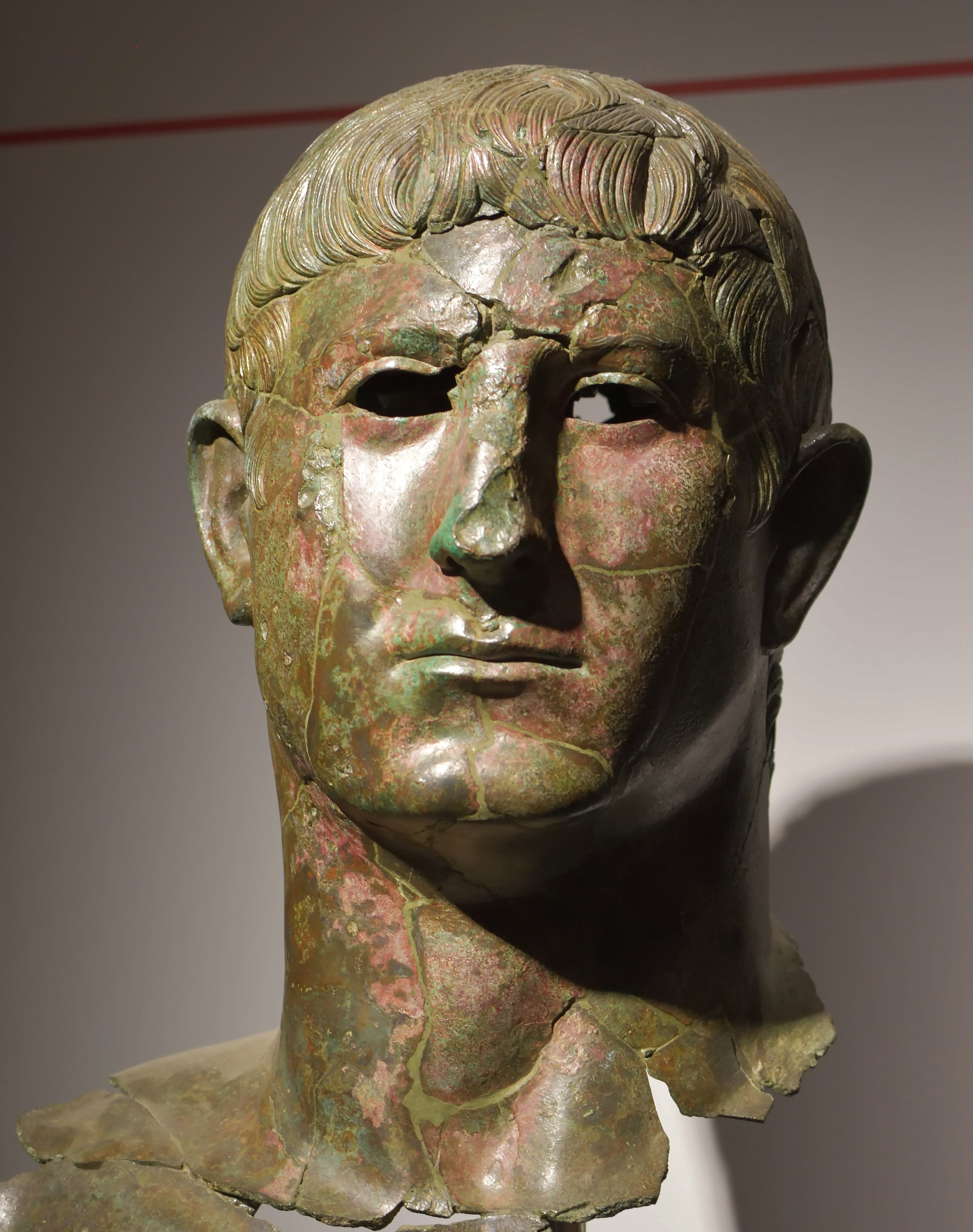
Head of the statue of Lucius Cornelius Pusio

Lucius Cornelius Pusio Annius Messalla was a Roman senator under the Flavian dynasty who held several offices in the emperor's service. He was suffect consul in an uncertain year, most likely 72 or 73, as the colleague of Plotius Pegasus. The shorter form of his name is Lucius Cornelius Pusio.

Anthony Birley guesses Messalla's origins lay in a Spanish province, "probably from Gades, with a residence at Tibur."

Messalla's cursus honorum can be reconstructed in part from a bronze tablet found in Rome. His public career began with the quatraviri viarum curandorum, one of the four boards that form the vigintiviri; this board was tasked with maintaining the city roads of Rome. He then was commissioned as a military tribune with Legio XIV Gemina stationed in Roman Britain; Birley dates this to before the year 60, meaning Messalla had left the legion when the unit triumphed in the Battle of Watling Street that year. He then proceeded through the traditional Republican magistracies -- quaestor, plebeian tribune and praetor -- before accepting a second commission, this time as legatus legionis or commander of Legio XVI Flavia Firma before the year 70. This was the point where the account of his cursus ends.

From other sources we know Messalla was co-opted into the Septemviri epulonum following his consulate. We also know he capped his senatorial career as a proconsular governor, but it is not certain whether it was of Africa or Asia. His son was the homonymous consul of the year 90, Lucius Cornelius Pusio Annius Messala.
