= Lucius Antistius Rusticus =

1st century Roman senator, consul and governor

Lucius Antistius Rusticus (c. 48 – 93) was a Roman senator active in the later part of the first century AD. He was suffect consul for March to April 90, with Lucius Julius Ursus Servianus as his colleague.

== Life ==
Rusticus was a native of Corduba. Ronald Syme notes an inscription recovered there attesting to a magistrate with an identical name. He may have descended from an Italian settler of the gens Antistia.

His first recorded post was the minor magistracy decemviri stlitibus iudicandis, one of the vigintiviri, which Syme believes indicates that Rusticus was either the son of a senator, or had been granted dignitas senatoria. The Year of the Four Emperors (AD 69) found him serving as a military tribune of Legio II Augusta, where Anthony Birley believes he played an important role in rallying the legions in Britain to Vespasian's side based on his adlection to the Senate with praetorian rank, and the dona militaria or decorations he received. This was followed with an appointment to the curatorship of the Viae Aurelia and Cornelia, and afterwards command of Legio VIII Augusta, which was stationed at Argentorate in Germania Superior.

In 83/84 Rusticus was appointed proconsular governor of Baetica. Syme considers this post a "posture of esteem". However, the relationship between this office and being favored in promotions has been questioned: in a study of this phenomenon, Paul Leunissen observed that "the number of ascertained cases remains low altogether and the differences between individual provinces are too small to justify any conclusion in the direction of ranking-differences between them ... only a few testimonia could bring about considerable shifts." One recorded act during his tenure as proconsul was his demarcating territory in a boundary dispute of the territory of the city of Cisimbrium (modern Zambra). This governorship was followed by a tenure as prefect of the Aerarium Saturni from 87 to 89.

After his consulship Rusticus was governor of the important province of Cappadocia-Galatia in 92/93. While governor of Cappadocia, the decurions of Antioch petitioned him for relief from a famine caused by a harsh winter; his response was recorded on an inscription retrieved from that city. He died while still governor, likely in c. 93; his successor, Titus Pomponius Bassus, is attested in office in 94, holding his suffect consulship that same year in absentia.

== Marriage ==
Rusticus is known to have married Mummia Nigrina, whom Martial states shared her inheritance with him (IV.75), showing she came from a wealthy family. According to Martial, she was present in Cappadocia when he died, for he mentions she brought his ashes back to Rome from there (IX.30). Mummia was somehow related to the Valerii Vegeti, but records explaining that relationship, or to other Mummii, have not yet been recovered. They are not recorded as having any children.

Political offices
Preceded by Lucius Cornelius Pusio Annius Messala; Marcus Cocceius Nerva II	Roman consul 90 (suffect) with Servius Julius Servianus	Succeeded by Quintus Accaeus Rufus; Gaius Caristanius Fronto as suffecti
