= Gaius Bellicius Flaccus Torquatus =

2nd century Roman senator and consul

Gaius Bellicius Flaccus Torquatus was a Roman senator during the reign of Antoninus Pius. He was consul prior in 143 with Herodes Atticus as his colleague. Flaccus Torquatus was the son of Gaius Bellicius Flaccus Torquatus Tebanianus, consul of 124, and the older brother of Gaius Bellicius Calpurnius Torquatus, consul of 148. He held the proconsular governorship of Asia for the term 156/157.

== See also ==
- Bellicia gens

Political offices
Preceded by (Sulpicius?) Julianus, and Titus Julius Castus as suffect consuls	Consul of the Roman Empire; AD 143 with Herodes Atticus	Succeeded by Quintus Junius Calamus, and Marcus Valerius Junianus as suffect consuls
