= Lucius Sempronius Atratinus (consul 34 BC) =

1st century BC Roman consul, legate and governor

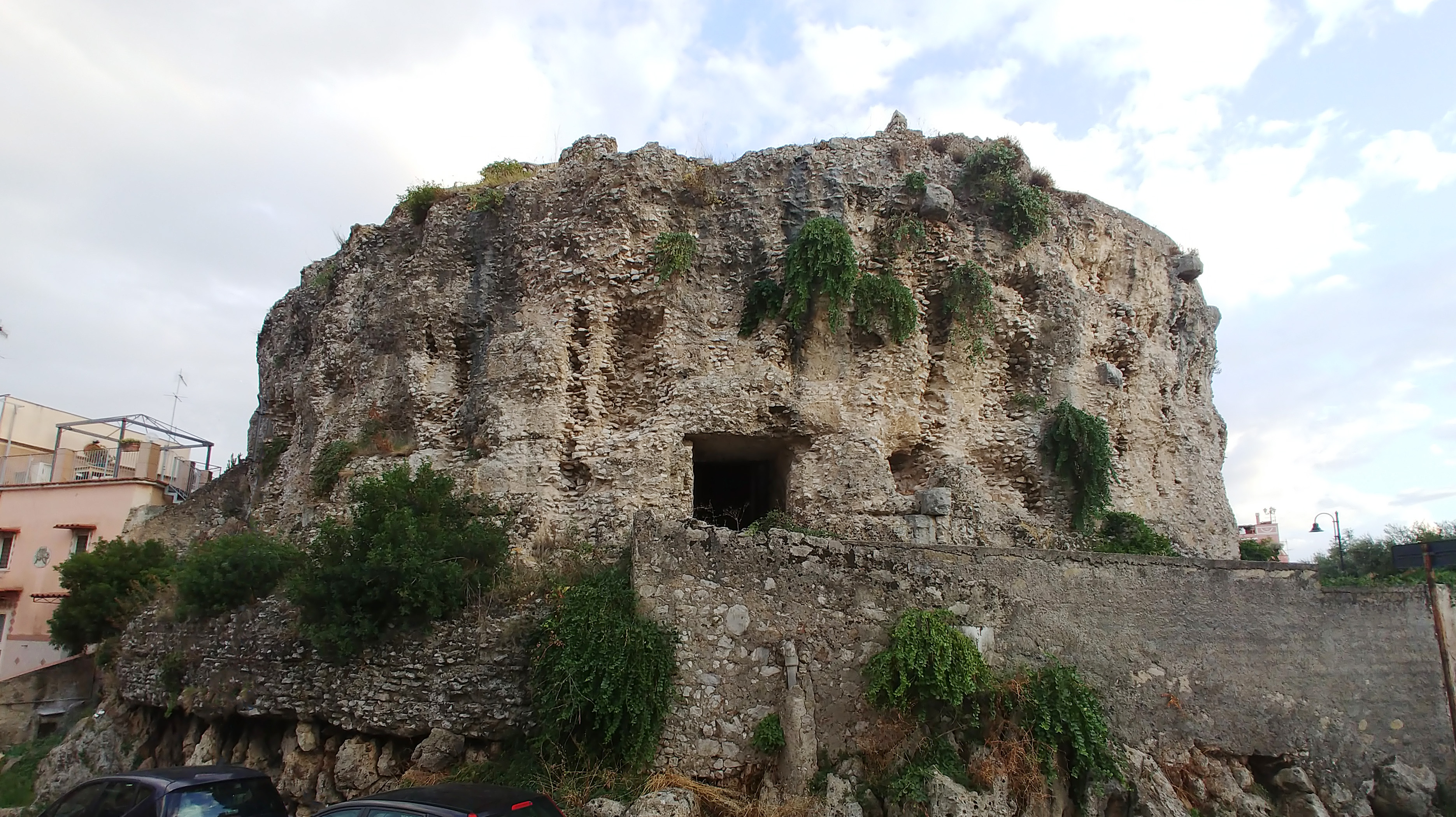
Mausoleum of Lucius Sempronius Atratinus

Lucius Sempronius Atratinus (died 7 AD) was a Roman politician who was elected suffect consul in 34 BC. He is mentioned in Pro Caelio, a famous speech in defense of Marcus Caelius Rufus by Marcus Tullius Cicero.

== Biography ==
Probably born a member of the patrician branch of the ancient Sempronia family, Atratinus was possibly adopted by Lucius Calpurnius Bestia, but did not assume his adopted father's nomen gentile. In 56 BC, at the age of 17, he launched a prosecution against Marcus Caelius Rufus who had previously unsuccessfully attempted to prosecute Atratinus's adopted father on bribery charges. Caelius had fallen out with his lover, Clodia, and she accused him of attempted poisoning. Other charges included the murder of an ambassador. She asked Atratinus to prosecute Caelius, which he was only too happy to do. Caelius was successfully defended by Marcus Tullius Cicero, and in his published speech Pro Caelio, Cicero claimed that Atratinus was being manipulated by Clodia to get revenge on Caelius for an affair gone wrong.

In 40 BC, Atratinus was elected praetor suffectus, as all the previously elected praetors had retired from office after the Treaty of Brundisium between Octavian, Mark Antony and Lepidus. Late in 40 BC, he and his colleague Marcus Valerius Messalla Corvinus convened the Roman Senate to introduce Herod the Great, who received the title of King of Judea. This same year he was elected to the role of Augur, one of the priests of ancient Rome, a position he held until his death in 7 AD.

A supporter of Mark Antony, Atratinus was one of his legates, serving as propraetor in Greece in 39 BC. In 36 BC he was given command of a portion of a fleet which Antony had sent to help Octavianus deal with Sextus Pompey. In 34 BC he was elected suffect consul on January 1, as Antony resigned his position as consul within 24 hours. Atratinus himself held the consulate until July 1 of that year. At some point prior to the Battle of Actium, Atratinus abandoned Antony and switched his support to Octavianus. He was made proconsular governor of Africa around 23 BC, and was awarded a triumph for his actions there in 21 BC.

Atratinus's sister, Sempronia, was married to Lucius Gellius Publicola. Atratinus' burial mausoleum is located in Gaeta, Italy.

== Works cited ==
- Skinner, Maryilyn (2011). Clodia Metelli: The Tribune's Sister. Oxford University Press. ISBN 9780195375008.

== Sources ==
- T. Robert S. Broughton, The Magistrates of the Roman Republic, Vol II (1952).
- Syme, Ronald, The Roman Revolution (1939)
- Holmes, T. Rice, The Roman Republic and the Founder of the Empire, Vol. II (1923)
- Anthon, Charles & Smith, William, A New Classical Dictionary of Greek and Roman Biography, Mythology and Geography (1860).

Political offices
Preceded by Mark Antony	Roman consul 34 BC (suffect) with Lucius Scribonius Libo	Succeeded by Paullus Aemilius Lepidus; Gaius Memmius
