= Marcus Cocceius Nerva (jurist) =

1st century AD Roman jurist

Marcus Cocceius Nerva (before 5 BC – AD 33) was a celebrated Roman jurist, and a member of the entourage of the Roman emperor Tiberius. His father was Marcus Cocceius Nerva, consul in 36 BC, and he was grandfather of the emperor Nerva.

In AD 24, the emperor appointed Nerva head of the curatores aquarum, a three-man commission responsible for Rome's water supply. Nine years later, in 33 he starved himself to death despite the pleas of Tiberius. In explanation Tacitus writes: "Those who knew his thoughts said that as he saw more closely into the miseries of the State, he chose, in anger and alarm, an honourable death, while he was yet safe and unassailed on." From this we may infer that he despaired at the tyrannies of the Praetorian Guard, and committed suicide as a form of protest; he may also have been worried about his own safety.

== Depictions ==
Nerva was portrayed by Donald Eccles in the 1968 television production The Caesars. He was played by Sir John Gielgud in the film Caligula. Robert Graves made him a character in his 1934 novel I, Claudius, but Nerva did not appear in the 1976 BBC television adaptation.

== See also ==
- Cocceia gens
