= Marcus Cocceius Nerva (consul 36 BC) =

Roman consul 36 BC

Marcus Cocceius Nerva was consul of the Roman Republic in 36 BC, together with Lucius Gellius Poplicola. His family were of Umbrian origin and were supporters of Marcus Antonius, providing him with a number of generals and diplomats.

Nerva was Proquaestor pro praetore under Antonius in 41 BC, and it is assumed that he was with Lucius Antonius during the Perusine War. He was one of the key military officers in Antonius's army who refused to fight Octavianus and brought about the reconciliation between the two men in 40 BC. Around 38 BC, Marcus Antonius appointed Nerva as the proconsular governor of Asia, during which time he was acclaimed as imperator for some military action at Lagina. For his services to Marcus Antonius, Nerva was elected consul in 36 BC. In 31 BC he was elected to the Quindecimviri sacris faciundis, and was raised to the Patriciate after 29 BC.

He is the great-grandfather of the more famous Emperor Nerva who ruled the Roman Empire from 96 to 98 AD. His son, also named Marcus Cocceius Nerva, was part of the entourage of emperor Tiberius.

== Sources ==
- T. Robert S. Broughton, The Magistrates of the Roman Republic, Vol II (1952).
- Syme, Ronald, The Roman Revolution, Clarendon Press, Oxford, 1939.
- Anthon, Charles & Smith, William, A New Classical Dictionary of Greek and Roman Biography, Mythology and Geography (1860).

== See also ==
- Cocceia gens

Political offices
Preceded by M. Agrippa; T. Statilius Taurus	Consul of the Roman Republic; January–June 36 BC; With: L. Gellius Poplicola	Succeeded by Q. Marcius
