= Testamentum Dasumii =

The Testamentum Dasumii refers to an inscription in several pieces found in Rome, that bears the only Roman will inscribed on stone. Originally presenting the complete will, while the surviving pieces of the inscription include parts of all 133 lines, much of the beginning and ends of all of the lines are missing. Nevertheless, it is of great value for prosopographic reasons, as well as an example of a Roman legal document for which otherwise there are few examples.

== Description ==
Pieces of this inscription were first found in 1820, containing lines 1-56 and more were identified in 1830, containing lines 57-133. Theodor Mommsen reconstructed this document for publication in the series Corpus Inscriptionum Latinarum, which was considered as faithful as possible until the recovery of a further piece by Antonio Ferrua in the 1970s, which added to the first 19 lines of the inscription. This new fragment proved Mommsen's restorations of those lines as inaccurate, and brought into question his restoration of the rest of the inscription. Since then, Werner Eck has offered a new restoration of those lines based on Ferrua's discovery, which while commonly accepted is still considered tentative.

The inscription is dated to the consulate of Publius Aelius Hadrianus and Marcus Trebatius Priscus, or the summer of 108.

== The testator ==
The will mentions a number of people -- the Epigraphische Datenbank Heidelberg counts 87 different people -- most prominent are the emperor Trajan, the consuls Lucius Julius Ursus Servianus, and Quintus Sosius Senecio. However, scholarly interest has primarily focused on the identity of the testator of the will. Bartolomeo Borghesi, noting a Da[sumia] amongst the heirs, and observing mention of a nurse Dasumia Syche, whom Borghesi concluded was a freedman of the testator, identified him as a member of the gens Dasumius -- hence the name of the stone. Mommsen embraced this identification, and at one point the testator was identified with Lucius Dasumius Hadrianus, suffect consul about 93, but various details prevented complete acceptance. It took Werner Eck's work to refute the identification decisively and show the testator did not belong to that gens.

Following Eck's article, Ronald Syme proposed Gnaeus Domitius Tullus as the testator. More recently, Joshua Tate has raised the possibility that the testator may not even be a senator, but points out that many problems in the document are resolved if he had been a wealthy freedman. "Until further research provides a more definite answer," Tate concludes, "we must remain open to the possibility that the testator was not only an Ignotus, but an Ignotus libertus".

== Other examples of Roman wills ==
There are few other examples of Roman wills. Literary sources present a few fictional examples, the will of Trimalchio in Petronius' Satyricon being the best known one. A less well known fictive example is the humorous Testamentum Porcelli, the last testament of a pig named M. Grunnius Corocotta, who dictates his testament in his last hours before being slaughtered by a butcher. Pliny the Younger recounts the opening of the will of his friend Domitius Tullus, without providing any information on the legal language of the document. A handful of actual wills have been identified amongst the papyrus, written by soldiers in Egypt such as Antonius Silvanus, but these are military wills and observe practices different than the so-called Testamentum Dasumii, which is an example of a will amentum per aes ci libram.
