= Sextus Cocceius Anicius Faustus Paulinus =

Sextus Cocceius Anicius Faustus Paulinus (fl. 3rd century AD) was a Roman senator who was appointed suffect consul sometime before AD 260/268.

Probably either the son or nephew of Anicius Faustus Paulinus, suffect consul before AD 230, Faustus Paulinus was a member of the Patrician 3rd century gens Anicia. He was appointed suffect consul sometime before AD 260/268, and was the proconsular governor of Africa, most likely around AD 265/268, but it has been acknowledged that he may have filled the office sometime later, possibly between AD 276 and 285.

It has been speculated that he was possibly the father of Anicius Faustus Paulinus, the consul of AD 298.

== Notes ==
Political offices
Preceded by Uncertain	Consul suffectus of the Roman Empire before AD 260/268	Succeeded by Uncertain
