= Nerva =

Roman emperor from AD 96 to 98

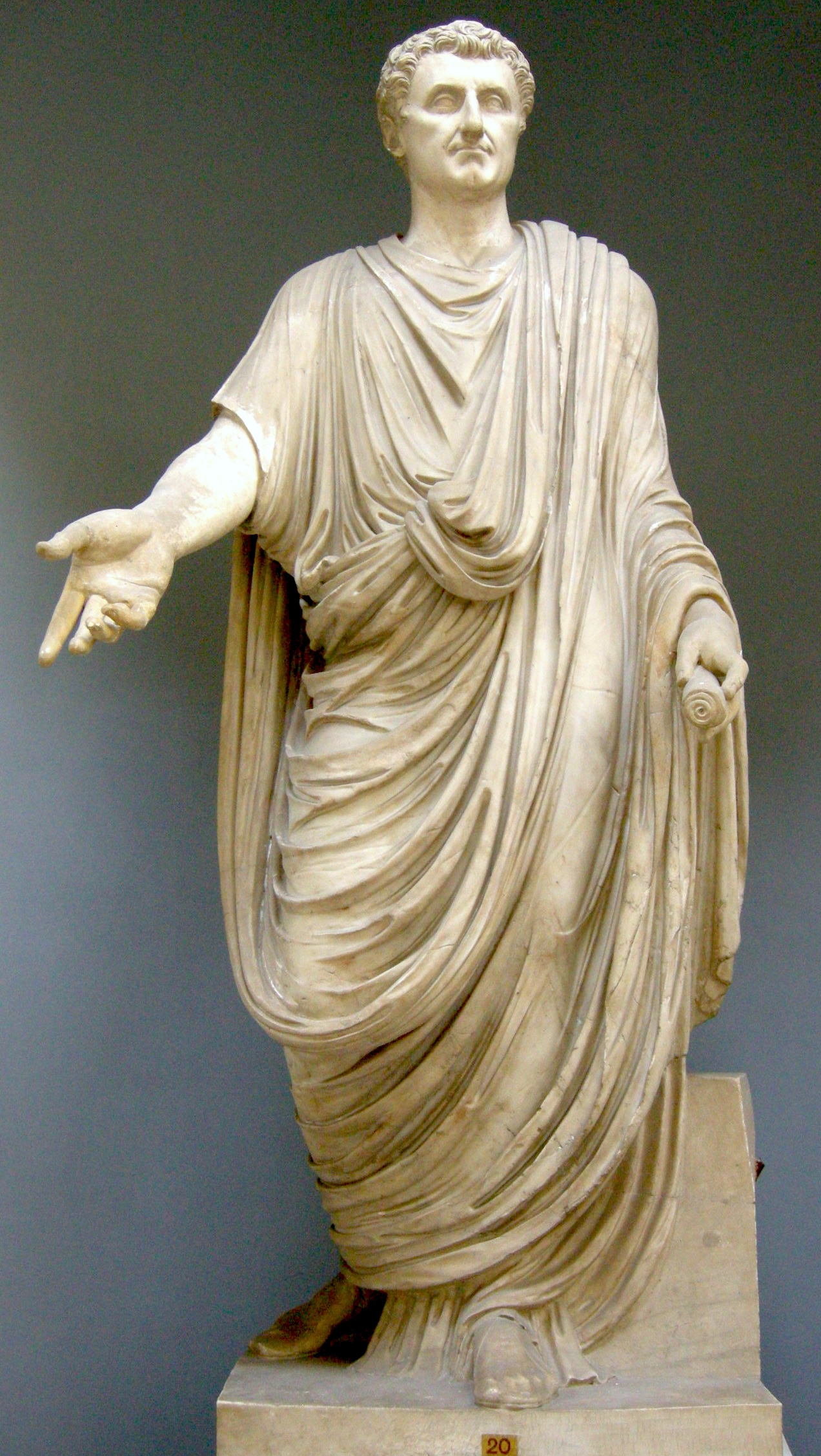
- Plaster cast head portrait set in 1st-century statue, Chiaramonti Museum

Roman emperor
- Reign: 18 September 96 – 27 January 98
- Predecessor: Domitian
- Successor: Trajan
- Born: Marcus Cocceius Nerva; 8 November 30 AD; Narni, Italy, Roman Empire
- Died: 27 January 98 AD (aged 67); Gardens of Sallust, Rome, Italia, Roman Empire
- Burial: Mausoleum of Augustus, Rome
- Issue: Trajan (adoptive)
Regnal name
- Imperator Nerva Caesar Augustus
- Dynasty: Nerva–Antonine
- Father: Marcus Cocceius Nerva
- Mother: Sergia Plautilla

Nerva (/ˈnɜːrvə/; born Marcus Cocceius Nerva; 8 November 30 – 27 January 98) was a Roman emperor from AD 96 to 98. Nerva became emperor when aged almost 66, after a lifetime of imperial service under Nero and the succeeding rulers of the Flavian dynasty.

Under Nero, he was a member of the imperial entourage and played a vital part in exposing the Pisonian conspiracy of 65. Later, as a loyalist to the Flavians, he attained consulships in 71 and 90 during the reigns of Vespasian and Domitian, respectively. After Domitian was assassinated in a palace conspiracy involving members of the Praetorian Guard and several of his freedmen on 18 September 96, Nerva was declared emperor by the Roman Senate. During his reign, he vowed to restore liberties which had been curtailed during the autocratic government of Domitian.

Nerva's brief reign was marred by financial difficulties and his inability to assert his authority over the Roman army. A revolt by the Praetorian Guard in October 97 essentially forced him to adopt an heir. After some deliberation Nerva adopted Trajan, a young and popular general, as his successor. After barely fifteen months in office, Nerva died of natural causes on 27 January 98. Upon his death he was succeeded and deified by Trajan. Although much of his life remains obscure, Nerva was considered a wise and moderate emperor by ancient historians. Nerva's greatest success was ensuring a peaceful transition of power after his death by selecting Trajan as his heir, thus founding the Nerva–Antonine dynasty. He was the first of the Five Good Emperors.

== Early career ==
=== Early life ===
Marcus Cocceius Nerva born in the village of Narni, 50 kilometers north of Rome, as the son of Marcus Cocceius Nerva, suffect consul during the reign of Caligula (37–41), and Sergia Plautilla. Cassius Dio states that Nerva was an Italiot, a Greek colonist in Italy, but doesn't specify his provincial origin. Aurelius Victor reports that he was from Crete.

Nerva was born on 8 November, but the exact year is disputed. Ancient sources report the date as either 30 or 35. He had at least one attested sister, named Cocceia, who married Lucius Salvius Otho Titianus, the brother of the earlier Emperor Otho. Like Vespasian, the founder of the Flavian dynasty, Nerva was a member of a newer Italian nobility and plebeian, rather than one of the patrician Julio-Claudians. Nevertheless, the Cocceii were among the most esteemed and prominent political families of the late Republic and early Empire, attaining consulships in each successive generation.

The direct ancestors of Nerva on his father's side, all named Marcus Cocceius Nerva, were associated with imperial circles from the time of Emperor Augustus (r. 27 BC – AD 14). His great-grandfather was consul in 36 BC (in replacement, and abdicated), and Governor of Asia in the same year. His grandfather became suffect consul in July of either 21 or 22, and was known as a personal friend of Emperor Tiberius (r. 14–37), accompanying the emperor during his voluntary seclusion on Capri from 23 onwards, dying in 33. Nerva's father finally attained the consulship under the Emperor Caligula. The Cocceii were connected with the Julio-Claudian dynasty through the marriage of Sergia Plautilla's brother Octavius Laenas and Rubellia Bassa, the great-granddaughter of Tiberius. Plautilla’s father was the senator Gaius Octavius Laenas.

=== Imperial service ===
The Roman Empire during the Year of the Four Emperors (69). Blue areas indicate provinces loyal to Vespasian and Gaius Licinius Mucianus; green areas indicate provinces loyal to Vitellius.

Not much of Nerva's early life or career is recorded, but it appears he did not pursue the usual administrative or military career. He was praetor-elect in the year 65 and, like his ancestors, moved in imperial circles as a skilled diplomat and strategist. As an advisor to Emperor Nero, he successfully helped detect and expose the Pisonian conspiracy of 65. His exact contribution to the investigation is not known, but his services must have been considerable, since they earned him rewards equal to those of Nero's guard prefect Tigellinus. He received triumphal honors – which was usually reserved for military victories – and the right to have his statues placed throughout the palace.

According to the contemporary poet Martial, Nero also held Nerva's literary abilities in high esteem, hailing him as the "Tibullus of our time". Another prominent member of Nero's entourage was Vespasian, an old and respected general who had celebrated military triumphs during the 40s. It appears Vespasian befriended Nerva during his time as an imperial advisor, and may have asked him to watch over Vespasian's youngest son Domitian when Vespasian departed for the Jewish war in 67.

The suicide of Nero on 9 June 68 brought the Julio-Claudian dynasty to an end, leading to the chaotic Year of the Four Emperors, which saw the successive rise and fall of the emperors Galba, Otho and Vitellius, until the accession of Vespasian on 21 December 69. Virtually nothing is known of Nerva's whereabouts during 69, but despite the fact that Otho was his brother-in-law, he appears to have been one of the earliest and strongest supporters of the Flavians.

For services unknown, he was rewarded with a consulship early in Vespasian's reign in 71. This was a remarkable honour, not only because he held this office early under the new regime, but also because it was an ordinary consulship (instead of a less prestigious suffect consulship), making him one of the few non-Flavians to be honoured in this way under Vespasian. After 71 Nerva again disappears from historical record, presumably continuing his career as an inconspicuous advisor under Vespasian (69–79) and his sons Titus (79–81) and Domitian (81–96).

He re-emerges during the revolt of Saturninus in 89. On 1 January 89, the governor of Germania Superior, Lucius Antonius Saturninus, and his two legions at Mainz, Legio XIV Gemina and Legio XXI Rapax, revolted against the Roman Empire with the aid of a tribe of the Chatti. The governor of Germania Inferior, Lappius Maximus, moved to the region at once, assisted by the procurator of Rhaetia, Titus Flavius Norbanus. Within twenty-four days the rebellion was crushed, and its leaders at Mainz savagely punished. The mutinous legions were sent to the front of Illyricum, while those who had assisted in their defeat were duly rewarded.

Domitian opened the year following the revolt by sharing the consulship with Nerva. Again, the honour suggested Nerva had played a part in uncovering the conspiracy, perhaps in a fashion similar to what he did during the Pisonian conspiracy under Nero. Alternatively, Domitian may have selected Nerva as his colleague to emphasise the stability and status quo of the regime. The revolt had been suppressed, and the Empire could return to order.

== Emperor ==
=== Accession ===
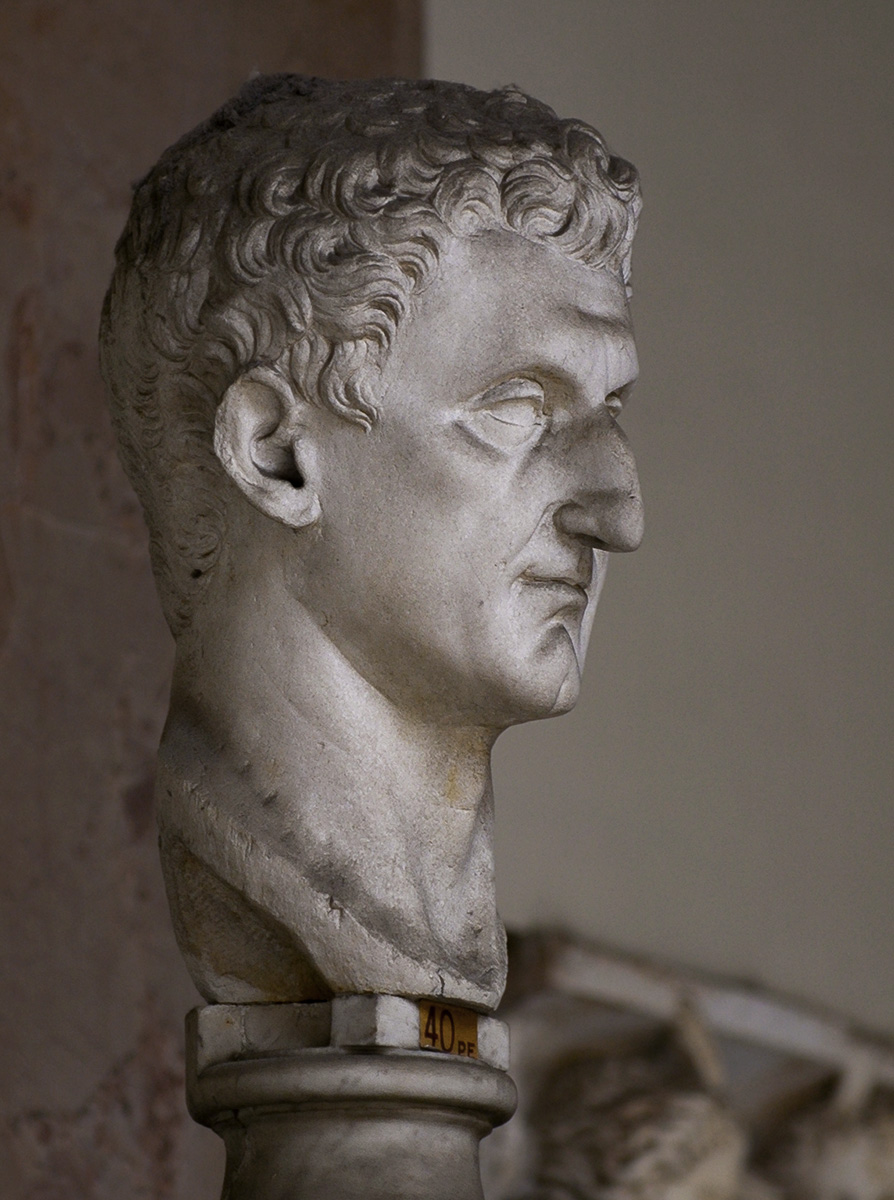
Head of Nerva, Vatican Museums, Pius-Clementine Museum, AD 96–98

On 18 September 96, Domitian was assassinated in a palace conspiracy organised by court officials. The Fasti Ostienses, the Ostian Calendar, records that the same day the Senate proclaimed Marcus Cocceius Nerva emperor. This was the first time the Roman Senate actually chose a new emperor rather than simply ratifying formally a choice made by either a previous emperor in his testament or an army or the Praetorian Guard. Despite his political experience, this was a remarkable choice. Nerva was old and childless, and had spent much of his career out of the public light, prompting both ancient and modern authors to speculate on his involvement in Domitian's assassination, although his probable lack of involvement would have made him acceptable to the Domitianic faction.

According to Cassius Dio, the conspirators approached Nerva as a potential successor prior to the assassination, which indicates that he was at least aware of the plot. Suetonius by contrast does not mention Nerva, but he may have omitted his role out of tactfulness. Considering the works of Suetonius were published under Nerva's direct descendants Trajan and Hadrian, it would have been less than sensitive of him to suggest the dynasty owed its accession to murder.

On the other hand, Nerva lacked widespread support in the Empire, and as a known Flavian loyalist his track record would not have recommended him to the conspirators. The precise facts have been obscured by history, but modern historians believe Nerva was proclaimed Emperor solely on the initiative of the Senate, within hours after the news of the assassination broke. Although he appeared to be an unlikely candidate on account of his age and weak health, Nerva was considered a safe choice precisely because he was old and childless.

Furthermore, he had close connections with the Flavian dynasty and commanded the respect of a substantial part of the Senate. Nerva had seen the anarchy which had resulted from the death of Nero; he knew that to hesitate even for a few hours could lead to violent civil conflict. Rather than decline the invitation and risk revolts, he accepted. The decision may have been hasty so as to avoid civil war, but neither the Senate nor Nerva appears to have been involved in the conspiracy against Domitian. Following the accession of Nerva as emperor, the Senate passed damnatio memoriae on Domitian: his statues were melted, his arches were torn down and his name was erased from all public records. In many instances, existing portraits of Domitian, such as those found on the Cancelleria Reliefs, were simply recarved to fit the likeness of Nerva. This allowed quick production of new images and recycling of previous material.

In addition, the vast palace which Domitian had erected on the Palatine Hill, known as the Flavian Palace, was renamed the "House of the People", and Nerva himself took up residence in Vespasian's former villa in the Gardens of Sallust.

=== Administration ===
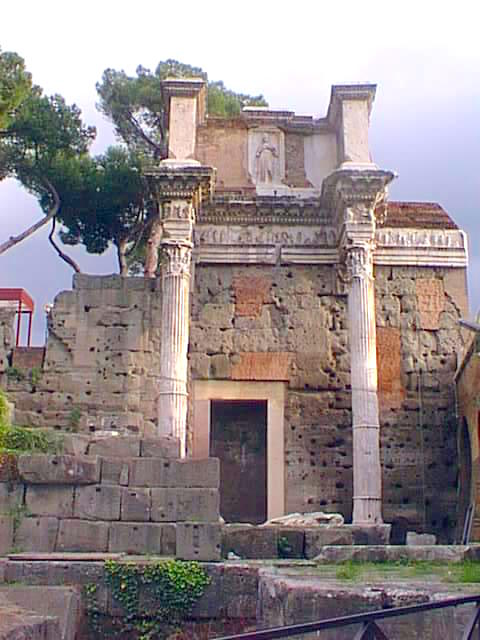
The last remaining columns from the largely blind peristyle surrounding a temple to Minerva, located at the heart of the Forum of Nerva. The visible door frame is not an original element but rather one of the many modifications made during the Middle Ages.

The change of government was welcome particularly to the senators, who had been harshly persecuted during Domitian's reign. As an immediate gesture of goodwill towards his supporters, Nerva publicly swore that no senators would be put to death as long as he remained in office. He called an end to trials based on treason, released those who had been imprisoned under these charges, and granted amnesty to many who had been exiled. All properties which had been confiscated by Domitian were returned to their respective families. Nerva also sought to involve the Senate in his government, but this was not entirely successful. He continued to rely largely on friends and advisors who were known and trusted, and by maintaining friendly relations with the pro-Domitianic faction of the Senate, he incurred hostility which may have been the cause for at least one conspiracy against his life.

Since Suetonius says the people were ambivalent at Domitian's death, Nerva had to introduce a number of measures to gain support among the Roman populace. As was custom by this time, a change of emperor was expected to bring with it a generous payment of gifts and money to the people and the army. Accordingly, a congiarium of 75 denarii per head was bestowed upon the citizens, while the soldiers of the Praetorian Guard received a donativum which may have amounted to as much as 5000 denarii per person. This was followed by a string of economic reforms intended to alleviate the burden of taxation from the most needy Romans.

To the poorest, Nerva granted allotments of land worth up to 60 million sesterces. He exempted parents and their children from a 5% inheritance tax, and he made loans to Italian landowners on the condition that they pay interest of 5% to their municipality to support the children of needy families – alimenta schemes which were later expanded by Trajan, Antoninus Pius, and Marcus Aurelius. Furthermore, numerous taxes were remitted and privileges granted to Roman provinces. Namely, he abolished abuses of the Fiscus Iudaicus, the additional tax which all Jews throughout the Empire had to pay: some of his coins bear the legend FISCI IUDAICI CALUMNIA SUBLATA (abolition of malicious prosecution regarding the Jewish tax). Coins suggest he added new games in the Circus in honor of Neptune. Other coins refer to imperial ideals such as equity, justice, and liberty, which contrasted his reign with that of Domitian.

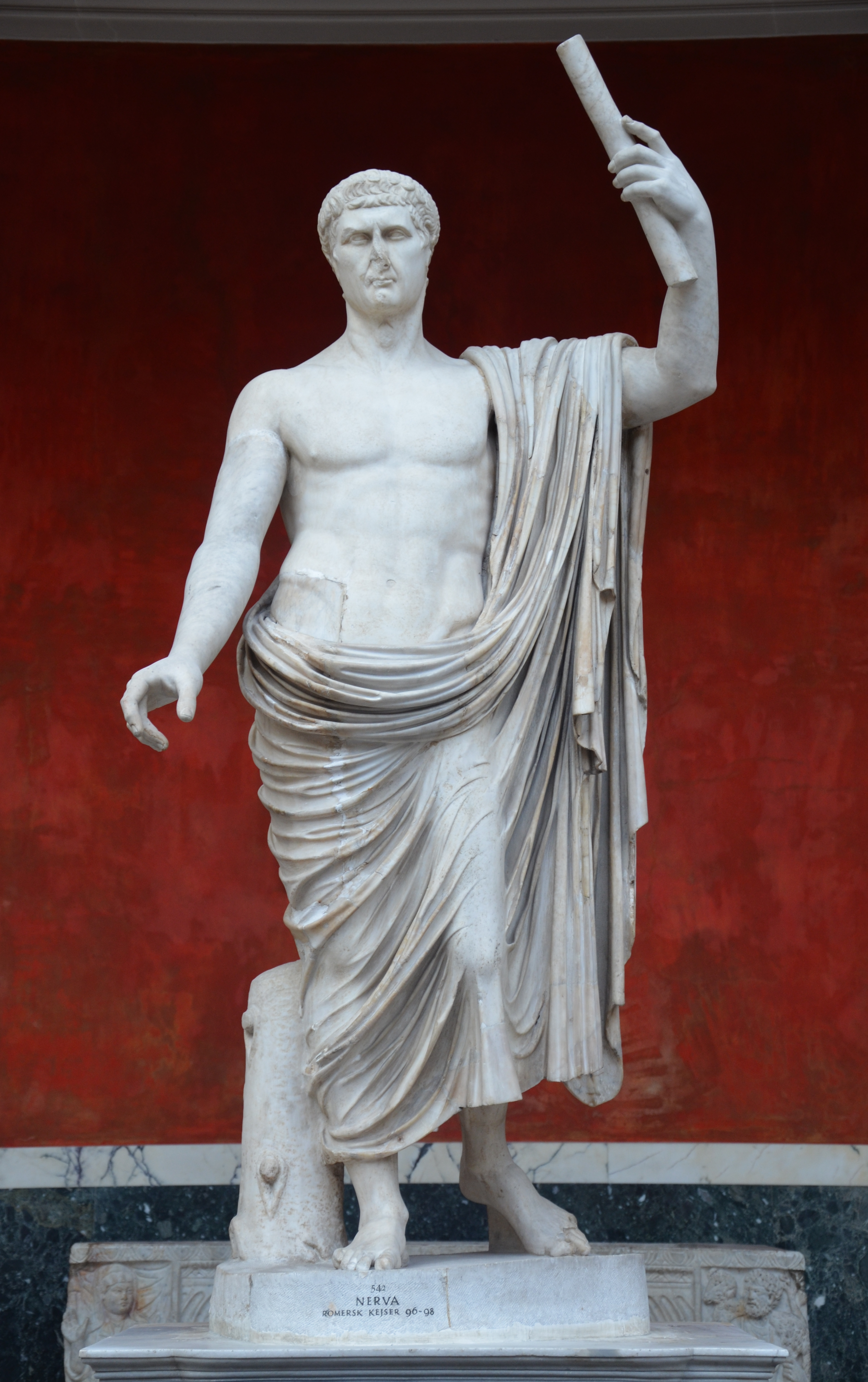
Nerva as Jupiter, Ny Carlsberg Glyptotek, Copenhagen

Before long, Nerva's expenses strained the economy of Rome and, although perhaps not ruinous to the extent once suggested by Syme, necessitated the formation of a special commission of economy to drastically reduce expenditures. The most superfluous religious sacrifices, games and horse races were abolished, while new income was generated from Domitian's former possessions, including the auctioning of ships, estates, and even furniture. Large amounts of money were obtained from Domitian's silver and gold statues, and Nerva forbade that similar images be made in his honor. Because he reigned only briefly, Nerva's public works were few, instead completing projects which had been initiated under Flavian rule. This included extensive repairs to the Roman road system and the expansion of the aqueducts. The latter program was headed by the former consul Sextus Julius Frontinus, who helped to put an end to abuses and later published a significant work on Rome's water supply, De aquaeductu. The only major landmarks constructed under Nerva were a horreum (granary), known as the Horrea Nervae, and the Forum of Nerva begun by Domitian, which linked the Forum of Augustus to the Temple of Peace.

=== Crisis of succession ===
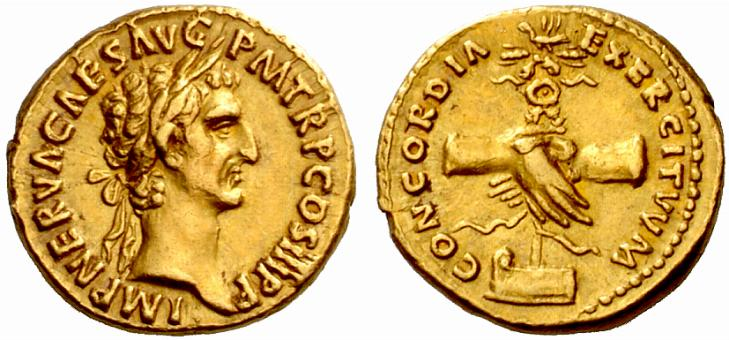
Roman aureus struck under Nerva, c. 97. The reverse reads Concordia Exercituum, symbolizing the unity between the emperor and the Roman army with two clasped hands over an army standard. Caption: IMP. NERVA CAES. AVG. P. M. TR. P., CO[N]S. III, P. P. / CONCORDIA EXERCITVVM

Despite Nerva's measures to remain popular with the Senate and the Roman people, support for Domitian remained strong in the army, which had called for his deification immediately after the assassination. In an attempt to appease the soldiers of the Praetorian Guard, Nerva had dismissed their prefect Titus Petronius Secundus – one of the chief conspirators against Domitian – and replaced him with a former commander, Casperius Aelianus.

Likewise, the generous donativum bestowed upon the soldiers following his accession was expected to swiftly silence any protests against the violent regime change. The Praetorians considered these measures insufficient, however, and demanded the execution of Domitian's assassins, which Nerva refused. Continued dissatisfaction with this state of affairs would ultimately lead to the gravest crisis of Nerva's reign.

While the rapid transfer of power following Domitian's death had prevented a civil war from erupting, Nerva's position as emperor soon proved too vulnerable, and his benign nature turned into a reluctance to assert his authority. Upon his accession, he had ordered a halt to treason trials, but at the same time allowed the prosecution of informers by the Senate to continue. This measure led to chaos, as everyone acted in his own interests while trying to settle scores with personal enemies, leading the consul Fronto to famously remark that Domitian's tyranny was ultimately preferable to Nerva's anarchy. Early in 97, a conspiracy led by the senator Crassus Frugi Licinianus failed, but once again Nerva refused to put the conspirators to death, much to the disapproval of the Senate.

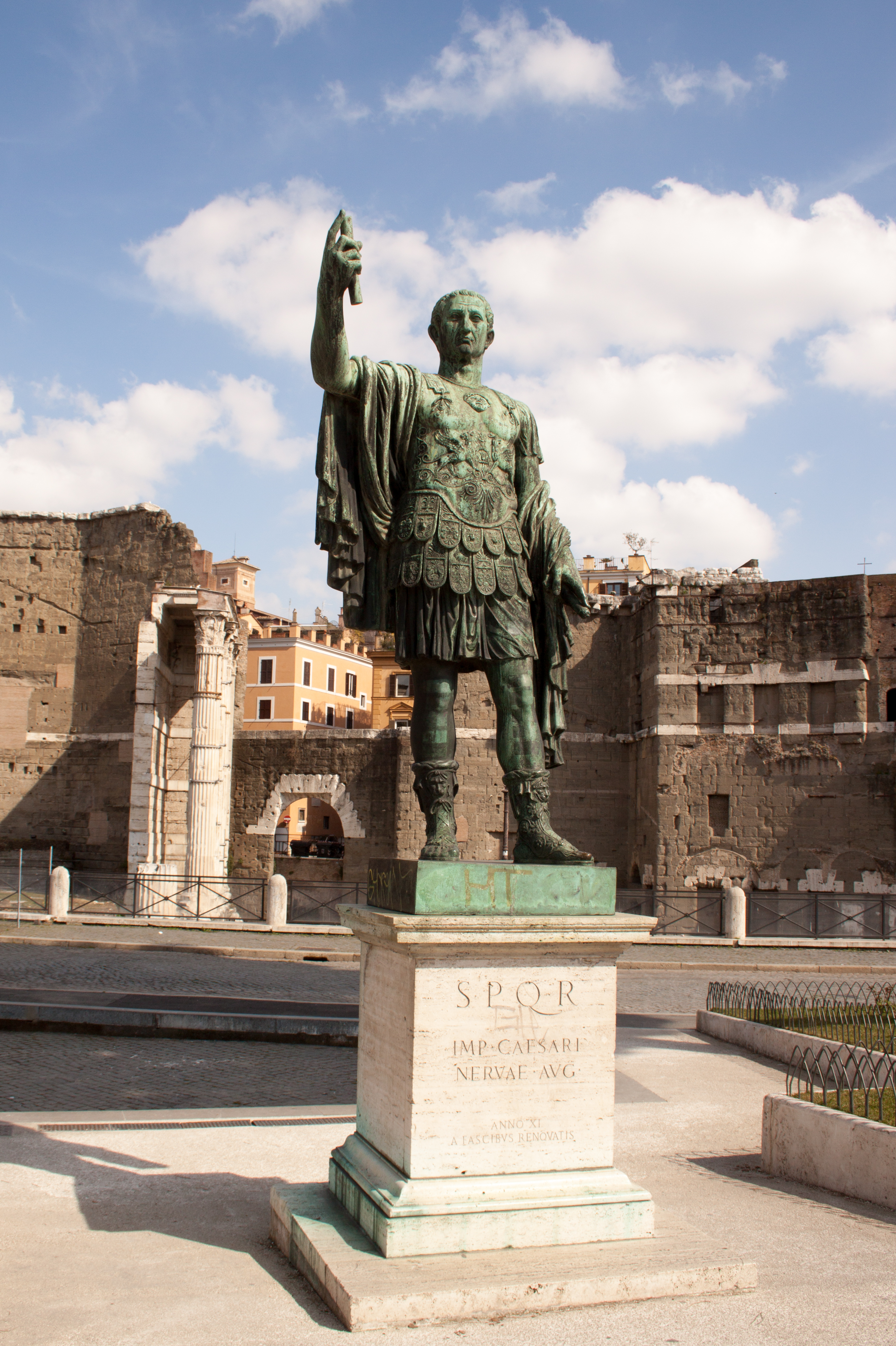
Bronze statue of Nerva in the Via dei Fori Imperiali, Rome

The situation was further aggravated by the absence of a clear successor, made more pressing because of Nerva's old age and sickness. He had no natural children of his own and only distant relatives, who were unsuited for political office. A successor would have to be chosen from among the governors or generals in the Empire and it appears that, by 97, Nerva was considering to adopt Marcus Cornelius Nigrinus Curiatius Maternus, the powerful governor of Syria. This was covertly opposed by those who supported the more popular military commander Trajan, a general of the armies at the German frontier.

In October 97, these tensions came to a head when the Praetorian Guard, led by Casperius Aelianus, laid siege to the Imperial Palace and took Nerva hostage. He was forced to submit to their demands, agreeing to hand over those responsible for Domitian's death and even giving a speech thanking the rebellious Praetorians.

Titus Petronius Secundus and Parthenius, Domitian's former chamberlain, were sought out and killed. Nerva was unharmed in this assault, but his authority was damaged beyond repair. Trajan later dispatched those commanders who had ordered the guard to besiege Nerva in his home. Nerva realized that his position was no longer tenable without the support of an heir who had the approval of both the army and the people. Shortly thereafter, he announced the adoption of Trajan as his successor, and with this decision all but abdicated. Trajan was formally bestowed with the title of Caesar and shared the consulship with Nerva in 98; in Cassius Dio's words:

Thus Trajan became Caesar and later emperor, although there were relatives of Nerva living. But Nerva did not esteem family relationship above the safety of the State, nor was he less inclined to adopt Trajan because the latter was a Spaniard instead of an Italian or Italot, inasmuch as no foreigner had previously held the Roman sovereignty; for he believed in looking at a man's ability rather than at his nationality.

Contrary to the view here popularized by Cassius Dio, however, Nerva had in fact little choice with regard to his successor. Faced with a major crisis, he desperately needed the support of a man who could restore his damaged reputation. The only candidate with sufficient military experience, consular ancestry, and connections was Trajan. Dio's claim that Trajan was of non-Italic origins is also rejected by scholars; it is known that Trajan's roots went back to Umbria, the same region where Nerva was born. Edward Gibbon's famous assertion that Nerva hereby established a tradition of succession through adoption among the Five Good Emperors has found little support among some modern historians.

== Death and legacy ==
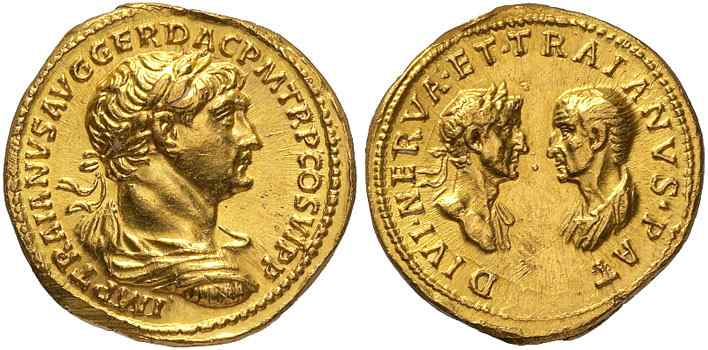
Roman aureus struck under Trajan, c. 115. The reverse commemorates both Trajan's natural father, Marcus Ulpius Traianus (right) and his adoptive father, the Deified Nerva (left). Caption: IMP. TRAIANVS AVG. GER. DAC. P. M., TR. P., CO[N]S. VI, P. P. / DIVI NERVA ET TRAIANVS PAT.

On 1 January 98, at the start of his fourth consulship, Nerva suffered a stroke during a private audience. Shortly thereafter he was struck by a fever and died at his villa in the Gardens of Sallust, on 27 January. (Note: Dio states he ruled 1 year, 4 months and 9 days. Other writers give 10 days instead of 9. As a result, some scholars give his death as 28 January.) He was deified by the Senate, and his ashes were laid to rest in the Mausoleum of Augustus. He was the last Roman emperor to be interred there. Nerva was succeeded without incident by his adopted son Trajan, who was greeted by the Roman populace with much enthusiasm. According to Pliny the Younger, Trajan dedicated a temple in honour of Nerva, yet no trace of it has ever been found; nor was a commemorative series of coins for the Deified Nerva issued until ten years after his death. According to Cassius Dio, however, the Guard prefect responsible for the mutiny against Nerva, Casperius Aelianus, was dismissed upon Trajan's accession.

Due to the lack of written sources on this period, much of Nerva's life has remained obscure. The most substantial surviving account of the reign of Nerva was written by the 3rd-century historian Cassius Dio. His Roman History, which spans nearly a millennium, from the arrival of Aeneas in Italy until the year 229, was composed more than one hundred years after Nerva had died. Further details are added by an abridged biography from the Epitome de Caesaribus, a work attributed to the 4th-century historian Aurelius Victor. A more comprehensive text, presumed to describe the life of Nerva in closer detail, is the Histories, by the contemporary historian Tacitus. The Histories is an account of the history of Rome covering three decades from the suicide of emperor Nero in 69 until the death of Domitian in 96.

However, a substantial part of the work has been lost, with only the first five books covering the Year of the Four Emperors remaining. In the introduction to his biography of Gnaeus Julius Agricola however, Tacitus speaks highly of Nerva, describing his reign as "the dawn of a most happy age, [when] Nerva Caesar blended things once irreconcilable, sovereignty and freedom". The surviving histories speak equally positively of Nerva's brief reign, although none offer a substantial commentary on his policies. Both Cassius Dio and Aurelius Victor emphasize his wisdom and moderation, with Dio commending his decision to adopt Trajan as his heir. These views were later popularized by the 18th-century historian Edward Gibbon in his History of the Decline and Fall of the Roman Empire. Gibbon considered Nerva the first of the Five Good Emperors, five successive rulers under whom the Roman Empire "was governed by absolute power, under the guidance of wisdom and virtue" from 96 until 180. Nevertheless, even Gibbon notes that, compared to his successors, Nerva may have lacked the necessary qualifications for a successful reign:

Nerva had scarcely accepted the purple from the assassins of Domitian before he discovered that his feeble age was unable to stem the torrent of public disorders which had multiplied under the long tyranny of his predecessor. His mild disposition was respected by the good; but the degenerate Romans required a more vigorous character, whose justice should strike terror into the guilty.

Modern history has expanded upon this sentiment, characterizing Nerva as a well-intentioned but weak and ineffectual ruler. The Roman Senate enjoyed renewed liberties under his rule, but Nerva's mismanagement of the state finances and lack of authority over the army ultimately brought Rome near the edge of a significant crisis. The mutiny led by Casperius Aelianus was never intended as a coup, but a calculated attempt to put pressure on the emperor. The adoption of Trajan expanded his power base with a respected, reliable general as his successor. Murison concludes that Nerva's real talents were in fact ill-suited to the emperorship:

Nerva was, it would seem, the ultimate "committee" man. He was not, apparently, a great orator, and one has the impression that he functioned better in small groups, where his generally calm approach to problems will have impressed people. [...] What is well-known today, however, is that, more often than not, if the "super committee man" takes on an important administrative job, the result is quite dreadful. Rome was, indeed, spared catastrophe; but for all that near-contemporary writers were "careful" about what they said, Nerva's administration was fairly inept. It would not be unfair to say that he was a textbook illustration of what nowadays is called the "Peter Principle".

His place in Roman history is therefore summarized as a necessary, if tumultuous stop-gap before the Trajanic-Antonine dynasties. Even the only major public work completed during his reign, the Forum of Nerva, ultimately became known as the Forum Transitorium, or transitional forum. Two modern statues which commemorate Nerva can be found in towns associated with him. There is an equestrian statue in Gloucester, England, a city which was founded in his honour. It is at the entrance to Southgate Street. There is also a statue at his alleged birthplace, Narni in Italy, at Cocceio Nerva street.

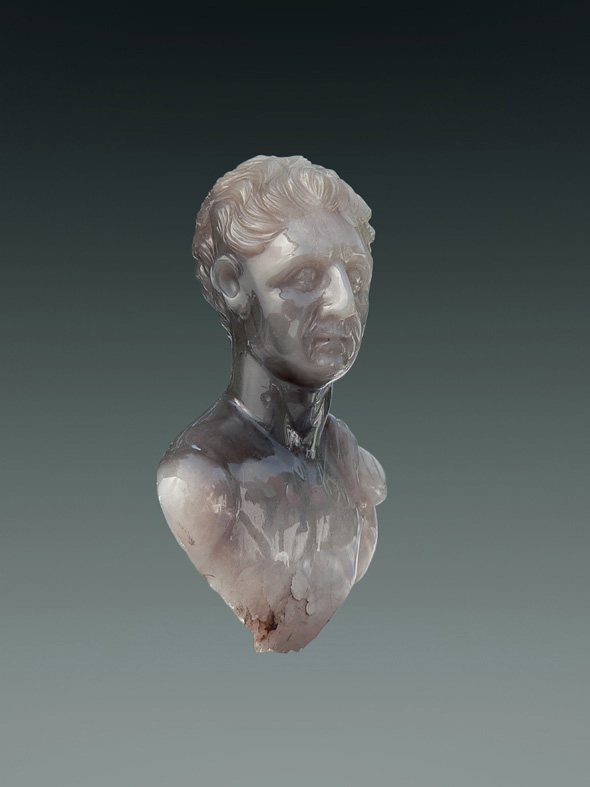
Unique, late 1st-century AD bust of emperor Nerva in chalcedony from private collection

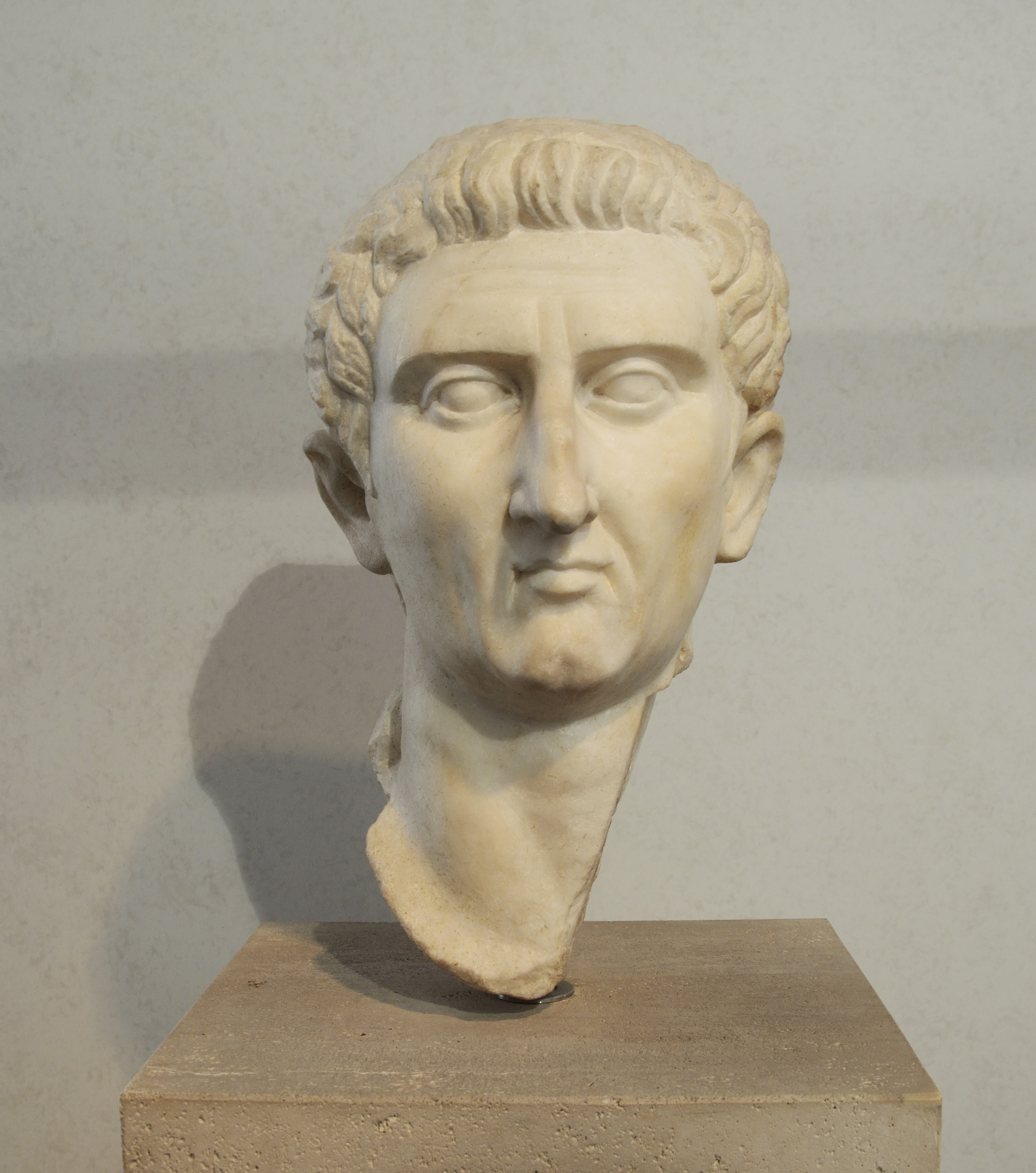
Bust of Nerva, Museo Nazionale Romano

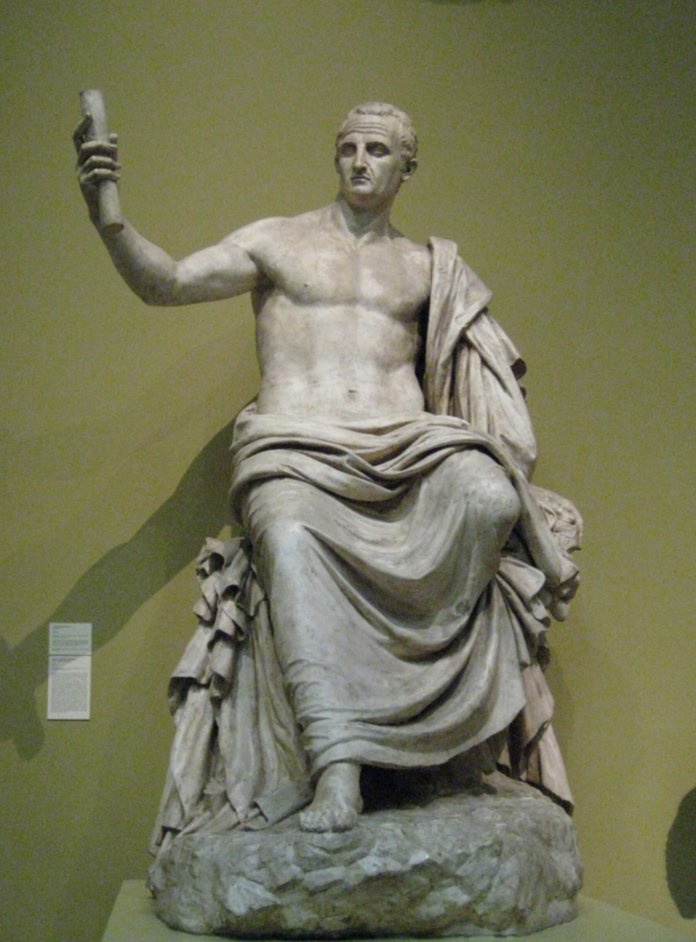
Nerva as Jupiter; cast of a sculpture in the Capitoline Museums (Pushkin Museum, Moscow)

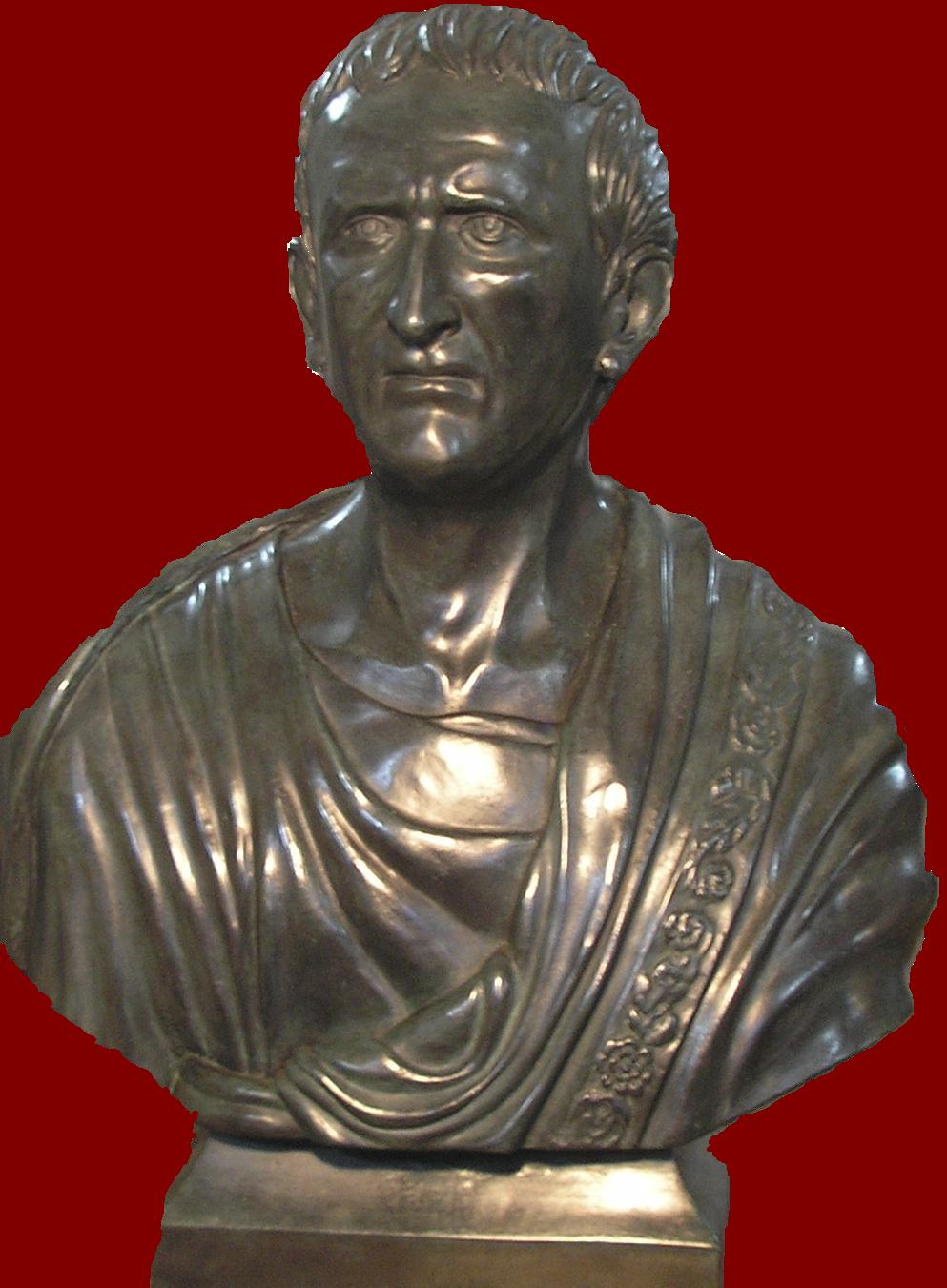
Sculpture in Narni town

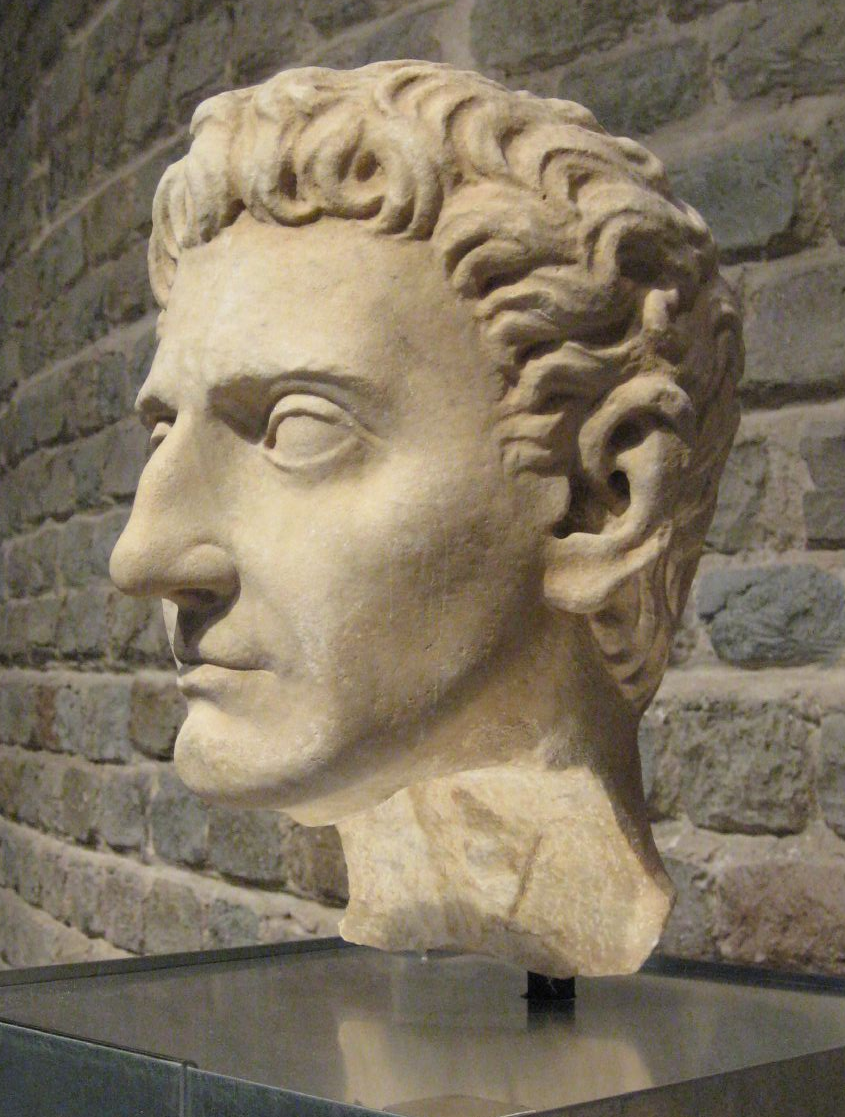
Bust of Nerva in the Roman-Germanic Museum of Cologne, Germany

== Nerva–Antonine family tree ==
Nerva–Antonine family tree

Q. Marcius Barea Soranus	Q. Marcius Barea Sura	Antonia Furnilla	M. Cocceius Nerva	Sergia Plautilla	P. Aelius Hadrianus
Titus (r. 79–81)	Marcia Furnilla	Marcia	Trajanus Pater	Nerva (r. 96–98)	Ulpia (Note: Sister of Trajan's father: Giacosa (1977), p. 7.)	Aelius Hadrianus Marullinus
Flavia (Note: Giacosa (1977), p. 8.)	Marciana (Note: Levick (2014), p. 161.)	C. Salonius Matidius (Note: Husband of Ulpia Marciana: Levick (2014), p. 161.)	Trajan (r. 98–117)	Plotina	P. Acilius Attianus	P. Aelius Afer (Note: Giacosa (1977), p. 7.)	Paulina Major (Note: DIR contributor (Herbert W. Benario, 2000), "Hadrian".)
Lucius Mindius (2)	Libo Rupilius Frugi (3)	Salonia Matidia (Note: Giacosa (1977), p. 9.)	L. Vibius Sabinus (1) (Note: Husband of Salonia Matidia: Levick (2014), p. 161.)
Paulina Minor	L. Julius Ursus Servianus (Note: Smith (1870), "Julius Servianus".)
Matidia Minor	Sabina	Hadrian (Note: Smith (1870), "Hadrian", pp. 319–322.) (r. 117–138)	Antinous (Note: Lover of Hadrian: Lambert (1984), p. 99 and passim; deification: Lambert (1984), pp. 2–5, etc.)
C. Fuscus Salinator I	Julia Serviana Paulina
M. Annius Verus (Note: Husband of Rupilia Faustina: Levick (2014), p. 163.)	Rupilia Faustina (Note: Levick (2014), p. 163.) (Note: It is uncertain whether Rupilia Faustina was Frugi's daughter by Salonia Matidia or another woman.)	Boionia Procilla	Cn. Arrius Antoninus
L. Ceionius Commodus	Appia Severa	C. Fuscus Salinator II
L. Caesennius Paetus	Arria Antonina	Arria Fadilla (Note: Levick (2014), p. 162.)	T. Aurelius Fulvus
L. Caesennius Antoninus	L. Commodus	Plautia	unknown (Note: Levick (2014), p. 164.)	C. Avidius Nigrinus
M. Annius Verus	Calvisia Domitia Lucilla (Note: Wife of M. Annius Verus: Giacosa (1977), p. 10.)	Fundania (Note: Wife of M. Annius Libo: Levick (2014), p. 163.)	M. Annius Libo	Faustina	Antoninus Pius (r. 138–161)	L. Aelius Caesar	Avidia
Cornificia	Marcus Aurelius (r. 161–180) (Note: Giacosa (1977), p. 10.)	Faustina Minor	Aurelia Fadilla	Lucius Verus (r. 161–169) (1)	Ceionia Fabia	Plautius Quintillus (Note: Husband of Ceionia Fabia: Levick (2014), p. 164.)	Q. Servilius Pudens	Ceionia Plautia
Cornificia Minor (Note: Levick (2014), p. 117.)	M. Petronius Sura	Commodus (r. 177–192)	Fadilla	M. Annius Verus Caesar	Ti. Claudius Pompeianus (2)	Lucilla	M. Plautius Quintillus	Junius Licinius Balbus	Servilia Ceionia
Petronius Antoninus	L. Aurelius Agaclytus (2)	Aurelia Sabina	L. Antistius Burrus (1)	Plautius Quintillus	Plautia Servilla	C. Furius Sabinus Timesitheus	Maecia Faustina	Junius Licinius Balbus?
Furia Sabinia Tranquillina	Gordian III (r. 238–244)

- (1) = 1st spouse
- (2) = 2nd spouse
- (3) = 3rd spouse
- Reddish-purple indicates emperor of the Nerva–Antonine dynasty
  lighter purple indicates designated imperial heir of said dynasty who never reigned
  grey indicates unsuccessful imperial aspirants
  bluish-purple indicates emperors of other dynasties
- dashed lines indicate adoption; dotted lines indicate love affairs/unmarried relationships
- Small Caps = posthumously deified (Augusti, Augustae, or other)

Notes:

Except where otherwise noted, the notes below indicate that an individual's parentage is as shown in the above family tree.

References:
- DIR contributors (2000). "De Imperatoribus Romanis: An Online Encyclopedia of Roman Rulers and Their Families".
- Giacosa, Giorgio (1977). Women of the Caesars: Their Lives and Portraits on Coins. Translated by Holloway, R. Ross. Milan: Edizioni Arte e Moneta. ISBN 0-8390-0193-2.
- Lambert, Royston (1984). Beloved and God: The Story of Hadrian and Antinous. New York: Viking. ISBN 0-670-15708-2.
- Levick, Barbara (2014). Faustina I and II: Imperial Women of the Golden Age. Oxford University Press. ISBN 978-0-19-537941-9.
- Smith, William, ed. (1870). Dictionary of Greek and Roman Biography and Mythology.

== See also ==
- Statue of Nerva

Nerva Nerva–Antonine dynasty Born: 8 November AD 30 Died: January 25 AD 98
Regnal titles
Preceded by Domitian	Roman emperor 96–98	Succeeded by Trajan
Political offices
Preceded by L. Annius Bassus; G. Laecanius Bassus Caecina Paetus	Consul of Rome; January–February 71; With: Vespasian III	Succeeded by Domitian; Gn. Pedius Cascus
Preceded by A. Vicirius Proculus; Mn. Laberius Maximus	Consul of Rome; January–February 90; With: Domitian XV; L. Cornelius Pusio Annius Messala	Succeeded by L. Antistius Rusticus; Ser. Julius Servianus
Preceded by Ti. Catius Caesius Fronto; Marcus Calpurnius [...]icus	Consul of Rome; January–February 97; With: L. Verginius Rufus III	Succeeded by Gn. Arrius Antoninus II; G. Calpurnius Piso
Preceded by P. Cornelius Tacitus; M. Ostorius Scapula	Consul of Rome; 1–13 January 98; With: Trajan II	Succeeded by Gn. Domitius Afer Curvius Tullus
