= List of Roman gentes =

The gens (plural gentes) was a Roman family, of Italic or Etruscan origins, consisting of all those individuals who shared the same nomen and claimed descent from a common ancestor. It was an important social and legal structure in early Roman history.

The distinguishing characteristic of a gens was the nomen gentilicium, or gentile name. Every member of a gens, whether by birth or adoption, bore this name. All nomina were based on other nouns, such as personal names, occupations, physical characteristics or behaviors, or locations. Consequently, most of them ended with the adjectival termination -ius (-ia in the feminine form).

Nomina ending in -aius, -eius, -eus, and -aeus are typical of Latin families. Faliscan gentes frequently had nomina ending in -ios, while Samnite and other Oscan-speaking peoples of southern Italy had nomina ending in -iis. Umbrian nomina typically end in -as, -anas, -enas, or -inas, while nomina ending in -arna, -erna, -ena, -enna, -ina, or -inna are characteristic of Etruscan families.

The word gens is feminine, and the name of a gens was also feminine. Marcus Valerius Corvus was a member of gens Valeria. Valerius was his nomen. His son's nomen would have been Valerius, and his daughter's Valeria. Male members of his gens were collectively called Valerii, and female members Valeriae. If a member of the gens were adopted into another family, he would assume the nomen of that gens, followed by the cognomen Valerianus.

In the following list, "I" and "J" are treated as separate letters, as are "U" and "V". The letter "K" was rare in Latin, and the few nomina occasionally spelled with this letter were usually spelled with "C". No Roman gentes began with "X", and the letters "Y" and "Z" occurred only in names borrowed from Greek. The letter "W" did not exist in Classical Latin.

== A ==
- Abronia
- Abudia
- Aburia
- Accia
- Accoleia
- Acerronia
- Acilia
- Aconia
- Actoria
- Acutia
- Aebutia
- Aedinia
- Aelia
- Aemilia
- Afinia
- Afrania
- Agoria
- Albania
- Albatia
- Albia
- Albinia
- Albinovana
- Albucia
- Alfena
- Alfia
- Alfidia
- Allectia
- Alliena
- Amafinia
- Amatia
- Ambrosia
- Ampia
- Ampudia
- Ancharia
- Anicia
- Annaea
- Anneia
- Annia
- Anquirinnia
- Antia
- Antistia
- Antonia
- Apisia
- Aponia
- Appia
- Appuleia
- Apronia
- Apustia
- Aquillia
- Aquinia
- Arellia
- Arennia
- Arminia
- Arpineia
- Arrecina
- Arria
- Arruntia
- Articuleia
- Artoria
- Asconia
- Asellia
- Asinia
- Ateia
- Aternia
- Atia
- Atidia
- Atilia
- Atinia
- Atria
- Attia
- Audasia
- Aufeia
- Aufidia
- Aulia
- Aurelia
- Auria
- Aurunculeia
- Ausonia
- Autronia
- Avia
- Aviana
- Avidia
- Aviena
- Avilia
- Axia

== B ==
- Babria
- Baebia
- Balonia
- Balventia
- Bantia
- Barbatia
- Barria
- Bavia
- Bellia
- Bellicia
- Belliena
- Betiliena
- Betua
- Betutia
- Blandia
- Blossia
- Boionia
- Brotia
- Bruttia
- Bucculeia
- Bucia
- Burbuleia
- Burriena

== C ==
- Caecia
- Caecilia
- Caecinia
- Caedicia
- Caelia
- Caeparia
- Caepasia
- Caerellia
- Caesellia
- Caesennia
- Caesetia
- Caesia
- Caesonia
- Caesulena
- Caetronia
- Calavia
- Calesterna
- Calidia
- Calpurnia
- Calventia
- Calvisia
- Campatia
- Cania
- Canidia
- Caninia
- Cantia
- Cantilia
- Canuleia
- Canutia
- Carfulena
- Caria
- Carisia
- Caristania
- Carpinatia
- Carrinatia
- Carteia
- Carvilia
- Casperia
- Cassia
- Castricia
- Castrinia
- Catia
- Catiena
- Catilia
- Ceionia
- Centenia
- Ceppuleia
- Cervonia
- Cestia
- Cestronia
- Cicereia
- Cilnia
- Cincia
- Cispia
- Classidia
- Claudia
- Cloelia
- Cluentia
- Clutoria
- Cluvia
- Cocceia
- Coelia
- Cominia
- Condetia
- Consentia
- Consia
- Considia
- Coponia
- Cordia
- Corfidia
- Cornelia
- Cornificia
- Coruncania
- Cosconia
- Cossinia
- Cossutia
- Cotia
- Cottia
- Crassicia
- Cremutia
- Crepereia
- Critonia
- Cupiennia
- Curia
- Curiatia
- Curtia
- Curtilia
- Curvia
- Cusinia
- Cuspia

== D ==
- Dasumia
- Decia
- Decidia
- Decimia
- Dellia
- Desticia
- Dexsia
- Didia
- Digitia
- Dillia
- Domitia
- Duccia
- Duilia
- Durmia
- Duronia

== E ==
- Eggia
- Egilia
- Egnatia
- Egnatuleia
- Egrilia
- Elvia
- Ennia
- Epidia
- Eppia
- Equitia
- Erbonia
- Erucia
- Esuvia

== F ==
- Fabia
- Fabricia
- Fadena
- Fadia
- Faenia
- Falcidia
- Faleria
- Faminia
- Fannia
- Farsuleia
- Faucia
- Favonia
- Festinia
- Fidiculania
- Firmia
- Flaminia
- Flavia
- Flavinia
- Flavoleia
- Flavonia
- Floria
- Floridia
- Floronia
- Fonteia
- Foslia
- Fufia
- Fuficia
- Fufidia
- Fulcinia
- Fulginatia
- Fulvia
- Fundania
- Furia
- Furnia
- Futia

== G ==
- Gabinia
- Galeria
- Gallia
- Gargonia
- Gavia
- Gegania
- Gellia
- Geminia
- Gennia
- Genucia
- Gessia
- Glicia
- Grania
- Gratidia
- Gratia

== H ==
- Hateria
- Heia
- Helvia
- Helvidia
- Herennia
- Herennuleia
- Herminia
- Hippia
- Hirria
- Hirtia
- Hirtuleia
- Holconia
- Horatia
- Hordeonia
- Hortensia
- Hosidia
- Hostia
- Hostilia

== I ==
- Iallia
- Iasdia
- Iccia
- Icilia
- Ignia
- Insteia
- Istacidia
- Iteia
- Ituria

== J ==
- Jania
- Javolena
- Jucundia
- Julia
- Juncia
- Junia
- Justia
- Justinia
- Justuleia
- Juventia

== L ==
- Laberia
- Labiena
- Laceria
- Laecania
- Laelia
- Laenia
- Laetilia
- Laetoria
- Lafrenia
- Lamponia
- Laronia
- Lartia
- Latinia
- Lavinia
- Lemonia
- Lentidia
- Lepidia
- Libertia
- Liburnia
- Licinia
- Ligaria
- Livia
- Livinia
- Lollia
- Longinia
- Loreia
- Lucceia
- Lucia
- Luciena
- Lucilia
- Lucretia
- Luria
- Luscia
- Lusia
- Lutatia

== M ==
- Maccia
- Macrinia
- Maecenatia
- Maecia
- Maecilia
- Maelia
- Maenatia
- Maenia
- Maevia
- Magia
- Mallia
- Mamercia
- Mamilia
- Manilia
- Manlia
- Marcia
- Maria
- Maruleia
- Martinia
- Matia
- Matiena
- Matinia
- Matrinia
- Maximia
- Memmia
- Menenia
- Menia
- Mescinia
- Messia
- Messiena
- Mestria
- Metilia
- Mettia
- Milonia
- Mimesia
- Minatia
- Mindia
- Minia
- Minicia
- Minidia
- Minucia
- Modia
- Mucia
- Mummia
- Munatia
- Munia
- Murria
- Mussidia
- Mustia
- Mutia
- Mutilia

== N ==
- Naevia
- Nasennia
- Nasidia
- Nasidiena
- Nautia
- Neratia
- Nerfinia
- Neria
- Nigidia
- Ninnia
- Nipia
- Nonia
- Norbana
- Novellia
- Novia
- Numeria
- Numicia
- Numisia
- Numitoria
- Nummia
- Numonia
- Nunnuleia
- Nymphidia

== O ==
- Obellia
- Obultronia
- Occia
- Oclatia
- Oclatinia
- Ocratia
- Octavena
- Octavia
- Ofania
- Ofilia
- Ogulnia
- Ollia
- Opellia
- Opetreia
- Opimia
- Opiternia
- Oppia
- Oppidia
- Opsia
- Opsidia
- Opsilia
- Orania
- Orbia
- Orbicia
- Orbilia
- Orchia
- Orcivia
- Orfia
- Orfidia
- Oscia
- Ostoria
- Otacilia
- Ovidia
- Ovinia

== P ==
- Paccia
- Pacidia
- Pacilia
- Paconia
- Pactumeia
- Pacuvia
- Palfuria
- Palpellia
- Pantuleia
- Papia
- Papinia
- Papiria
- Pasidia
- Pasidiena
- Passiena
- Patulcia
- Pedania
- Pedia
- Peducaea
- Peltrasia
- Percennia
- Perpernia
- Persia
- Pescennia
- Petillia
- Petreia
- Petronia
- Petrosidia
- Pilia
- Pinaria
- Pinnia
- Pisentia
- Placidia
- Plaetoria
- Plaguleia
- Plancia
- Plaria
- Plautia
- Pleminia
- Plinia
- Poetelia
- Pollia
- Pomentina
- Pompeia
- Pompilia
- Pomponia
- Pomptina
- Pontia
- Pontidia
- Pontilia
- Pontiliena
- Popillia
- Popaedia
- Popidia
- Poppaea
- Porcia
- Postumia
- Postumulena
- Potitia
- Praecilia
- Praeconia
- Prastinia
- Precia
- Priscia
- Procilia
- Proculeia
- Propertia
- Publicia
- Publilia
- Pupia

== Q ==
- Quartia
- Quartinia
- Quinctia
- Quinctilia
- Quintinia
- Quirinia

== R ==
- Rabiria
- Rabonia
- Rabuleia
- Racilia
- Raecia
- Ragonia
- Rammia
- Rancia
- Rania
- Rasinia
- Reginia
- Remmia
- Rennia
- Resia
- Romania
- Romilia
- Roscia
- Rubellia
- Rubrena
- Rubria
- Rufia
- Rufinia
- Rufria
- Rullia
- Rupilia
- Rusonia
- Rustia
- Rusticelia
- Rutilia

== S ==
- Sabellia
- Sabidia
- Sabinia
- Sabucia
- Sacratoria
- Saenia
- Safinia
- Saliena
- Sallustia
- Salonia
- Saltia
- Saltoria
- Salvia
- Salvidia
- Salvidiena
- Salviena
- Sammia
- Sanquinia
- Saria
- Sariolena
- Satellia
- Satria
- Satriena
- Sattia
- Saturia
- Saturninia
- Saufeia
- Scaevia
- Scaevinia
- Scandilia
- Scantia
- Scantinia
- Scaptia
- Scoedia
- Scribonia
- Scutaria
- Seccia
- Secundia
- Secundinia
- Sedatia
- Segulia
- Seia
- Selicia
- Sellia
- Sempronia
- Sennia
- Sentia
- Seppia
- Seppiena
- Septicia
- Septimia
- Septimuleia
- Septueia
- Sepullia
- Sepunia
- Sergia
- Seria
- Sertoria
- Servaea
- Servenia
- Servia
- Servilia
- Sestia
- Severia
- Sextia
- Sextilia
- Sibidiena
- Sicinia
- Silia
- Silicia
- Silvia
- Simplicia
- Simplicinia
- Sinicia
- Sinnia
- Sittia
- Socellia
- Sollia
- Sornatia
- Sosia
- Sotidia
- Spedia
- Spellia
- Splattia
- Spuria
- Spurilia
- Spurinnia
- Staberia
- Staia
- Stallia
- Statia
- Statilia
- Statinia
- Statoria
- Steia
- Stellia
- Stenia
- Stertinia
- Stlaccia
- Strabonia
- Subria
- Suedia
- Suellia
- Suetonia
- Suettia
- Suilia
- Sulpicia
- Surdinia
- Symmachi

== T ==
- Tadia
- Talia
- Tampia
- Tanicia
- Tannonia
- Tanusia
- Tapsennia
- Taracia
- Taria
- Tariolena
- Taronia
- Tarpeia
- Tarquinia
- Tarquitia
- Tarrutenia
- Tarutia
- Tarutilia
- Tatia
- Tattia
- Tauria
- Tebana
- Tedius
- Teia
- Terentia
- Terentilia
- Tertia
- Tertinia
- Tetrinia
- Tettia
- Tettidia
- Tettiena
- Thorania
- Thoria
- Tiburtia
- Ticinia
- Tifernia
- Tigellia
- Tigidia
- Tillia
- Tineia
- Titania
- Titedia
- Titia
- Titinia
- Tittia
- Titucia
- Titulena
- Tituria
- Titurnia
- Tolumnia
- Traia
- Traula
- Trausia
- Travia
- Trebania
- Trebatia
- Trebellia
- Trebelliena
- Trebia
- Trebicia
- Trebonia
- Trebulana
- Tremellia
- Triaria
- Triccia
- Truttedia
- Trutteia
- Tuccia
- Tudicia
- Tullia
- Turbonia
- Turcia
- Turia
- Turpilia
- Turrania
- Turselia
- Tursidia
- Turullia
- Tuscenia
- Tuscilia
- Tussania
- Tussidia
- Tutia
- Tuticana
- Tuticia
- Tutilia
- Tutinia
- Tutoria

== U ==
- Ulpia
- Umbilia
- Umbonia
- Umbrena
- Umbria
- Umbricia
- Ummidia
- Urbania
- Urbicia
- Urbinia
- Urgulania
- Urseia
- Urvinia
- Usia
- Utiana
- Utilia
- Uttiedia

== V ==
- Valeria
- Valentia
- Valgia
- Vallia
- Vannia
- Varena
- Vargunteia
- Varia
- Varinia
- Varisidia
- Vatinia
- Vatronia
- Vecilia
- Vedia
- Velia
- Velleia
- Venafrania
- Ventidia
- Venuleia
- Vequasia
- Verania
- Verecundia
- Vergilia
- Verginia
- Verres
- Verria
- Vesnia
- Vesonia
- Vestoria
- Vestricia
- Vetilia
- Vettia
- Veturia
- Vibenia
- Vibia
- Vibidia
- Vibullia
- Viciria
- Victoria
- Victorinia
- Victricia
- Viducia
- Vigilia
- Villia
- Vinia
- Vinicia
- Vipsania
- Vipstana
- Viria
- Viridia
- Visellia
- Vistilia
- Vitellia
- Vitrasia
- Vitruvia
- Voconia
- Volcacia
- Volturcia
- Volumnia
- Volusena
- Volusenna
- Volusia
- Vorenia
- Vulia

== See also ==
- Roman naming conventions
- List of Roman nomina
- List of Roman cognomina
- Roman gentes of Etruscan origin
- Roman gentes of Hernician origin
- Roman gentes of Latin origin from Alba Longa
- Roman gentes of Latin origin from Praeneste
- Roman gentes of Latin origin from Tibur
- Roman gentes of Latin origin from Tusculum
- Roman gentes of Picentine origin
- Roman gentes of Sabine origin
- Roman gentes of Samnite origin
- Roman gentes of Umbrian origin
- Roman gentes of Volscian origin
- Prosopography of ancient Rome
