= Bantia (disambiguation) =

Bantia is the ancient name for the town of Banzi in Italy.

Bantia may also refer to:

- Bantia (gens), a Roman family
- Bantia (mantis), a genus of praying mantises
