= Hippia gens =

Ancient Roman family

The gens Hippia was an obscure plebeian family of ancient Rome. No members of this gens are mentioned by Roman writers, but several are known from inscriptions.

== Members ==
This list includes abbreviated praenomina. For an explanation of this practice, see filiation.

- Gaius Hippius C. l. Diphilus, a freedman buried at Casilinum in Campania, in a tomb dating from the first half of the first century, built by one of his children—perhaps Hippia Tertia, buried in the same place.
- Publius Hippius P. f. Stabilio, dedicated a tomb at Rufrae in Campania, dating from the early or middle part of the first century, for himself and his patron, Publius Hippius Suilla, using the proceeds of a legacy left to him.
- Publius Hippius P. f. Suilla, buried at Rufrae, in a tomb dating from the early or middle part of the first century, built by his client, Publius Hippius Stabilio.
- Hippia C. f. Tertia, buried at Casilinum in a tomb dating from the first half of the first century, built by one of her siblings out of the proceeds of a legacy. She or her siblings may have built the adjacent tomb of Gaius Hippius Diphilus, perhaps their father. At least two other persons with incomplete names, one of them Bithynicus, appear to be buried in the same tomb.

== See also ==
- List of Roman gentes

== Bibliography ==
- Laura Chioffi, La raccolta epigrafica, Capua (The Epigraphic Collection of Capua), Museo provinciale Campano di Capua (2005).
- Theodor Mommsen et alii, Corpus Inscriptionum Latinarum (The Body of Latin Inscriptions, abbreviated CIL), Berlin-Brandenburgische Akademie der Wissenschaften (1853–present).
- Heikki Solin, Analecta Epigraphica 1970–1997, Acta Instituti Romani Finlandiae, Rome (1998).
