= Asconia gens =

Ancient Roman family

The gens Asconia was a plebeian family at Rome during the first century AD. It is known chiefly from a single individual, Quintus Asconius Pedianus, a commentator on Cicero. There is some reason to believe that he was a native of Patavium, in which case the gens may be of Venetic or Etruscan origin.

== See also ==
- List of Roman gentes
