= Rusonia gens =

Plebeian family at ancient Rome

The gens Rusonia was an obscure plebeian family at ancient Rome. Hardly any members of this gens are mentioned in history, but several are known from inscriptions.

== Origin ==
The nomen Rusonius belongs to a class of gentilicia formed primarily from cognomina ending in -o, in this case Ruso, of uncertain meaning.

== Members ==
This list includes abbreviated praenomina. For an explanation of this practice, see filiation.

- Lucius Rusonius, named in an inscription from Nicopolis ad Istrum in Moesia Inferior.
- Gaius Rusonius Adjutor, a soldier serving in the fifth cohort of the vigiles, in the century of Publius Aelius Septimius Romulus, at the beginning of the third century.
- Gaius Rusonius P. l. Chrestus, a freedman named in an inscription from Hispellum in Umbria.
- Rusonius Epictetus, buried at Lugdunum in Gallia Lugdunensis, in a tomb dedicated by his foster-father.
- Rusonius Hylas, a freedman, and one of the Seviri Augustales at Lugdunum, where he was buried in a tomb dedicated by his colleague, Gaius Rusonius Mercurialis.
- Gaius Rusonius Mercurialis, a freedman, and one of the Seviri Augustales at Lugdunum, where he dedicated a tomb for his colleague, Rusonius Hylas.
- Gaius Rusonius Myron, a freedman, and one of the Seviri Augustales at Lugdunum, where he dedicated a tomb for his colleague, Gaius Rusonius Secundus.
- Rusonia Nonna, buried at Durocortorum in Gallia Belgica, with a tomb dedicated by her husband, Maianus Primus, a cassidarius, or helmet-maker.
- Rusonius Patrophilus, a freedman buried at Lugdunum, with a tomb dedicated by Rusonius Senator.
- Gaius Rusonius Secundus, a freedman, and one of the Seviri Augustales at Lugdunum, where he was buried in a tomb dedicated by his colleague, Gaius Rusonius Myron.
- Rusonius Senator, a freedman, who dedicated a tomb at Lugdunum for Rusonius Patrophilus.

== See also ==
- List of Roman gentes

== Bibliography ==
- Theodor Mommsen et alii, Corpus Inscriptionum Latinarum (The Body of Latin Inscriptions, abbreviated CIL), Berlin-Brandenburgische Akademie der Wissenschaften (1853–present).
- René Cagnat et alii, L'Année épigraphique (The Year in Epigraphy, abbreviated AE), Presses Universitaires de France (1888–present).
- George Davis Chase, "The Origin of Roman Praenomina", in Harvard Studies in Classical Philology, vol. VIII, pp. 103–184 (1897).
