= Castricia gens =

Minor plebeian family of Rome

The gens Castricia was a minor plebeian family during the later Republic and under the early Empire. No members of this gens held any important magistracy.

== Origin ==
The earliest of the Castricii to appear in history was Marcus Castricius, chief magistrate of Placentia in 84 BC, suggesting that the family came from that city. At one time Placentia had belonged to the Etruscans, and later it was inhabited by the Cisalpine Gauls, but a Roman colony was established there in 218 BC. Other Castricii during this period and subsequently were Roman citizens.

== Members ==
- Marcus Castricius, chief magistrate at Placentia in 84 BC, refused to give hostages to the consul Gnaeus Papirius Carbo, when he appeared before the town.
- Marcus Castricius, a Roman merchant in Asia, received a public funeral from the inhabitants of Smyrna. He is probably the same Marcus Castricius mentioned in Cicero's orations against Verres.
- Marcus Castricius, mentioned by Cicero in 44 BC, was apparently a different man from the merchant of the same name.
- Castricius, gave information to Augustus respecting the conspiracy of Murena.
- Titus Castricius, a rhetorician at Rome, and a teacher of Aulus Gellius, by whom he is frequently mentioned.

== See also ==
- List of Roman gentes
