= Egnatuleia gens =

Roman family

The gens Egnatuleia was a plebeian family at ancient Rome. The only member of the gens to achieve any of the higher offices of the state was Lucius Egnatuleius, quaestor in 44 BC.

== Members ==
This list includes abbreviated praenomina. For an explanation of this practice, see filiation.

- Gaius Egnatuleius, father of the triumvir monetalis.
- Gaius Egnatuleius C. f., triumvir monetalis in 97 BC. He struck a quinarius bearing the head of Apollo on the obverse, and Victoria with a trophy on the reverse.
- Lucius Egnatuleius, quaestor in 44 BC. He commanded the fourth legion, which deserted from Marcus Antonius to Octavian. As a reward for his conduct on this occasion, Cicero proposed in the senate that he should be allowed to hold public offices three years before the legal time.
- Egnatuleius Crescens, legate of Numidia under Magnentius.
- (? Egn)atuleius Herculius, praefectus annonae under Magnus Maximus.

== See also ==
- List of Roman gentes
