= Tigellia gens =

Ancient Roman family

The gens Tigellia was an obscure plebeian family at ancient Rome. Almost no members of this gens are mentioned by Roman writers, but a few are known from inscriptions.

== Origin ==
The nomen Tigellius seems to belong to a class of gentilicia formed from cognomina using the double-diminutive suffix -ellius. The precise origin of the name is not apparent, as there seems to be no surname Tigus, or any corresponding word in Latin.

== Members ==
This list includes abbreviated praenomina. For an explanation of this practice, see filiation.

- Tigellius Sardus, a popular singer and flautist, was a grandson of Cicero's friend Phamea. Cicero describes the two of them as a pair of worthless "Sardinians for sale" in a letter written to his friend, Marcus Fadius Gallus, in 45 BC. He should perhaps be distinguished from the singing teacher and would-be satirist.
- Marcus Tigellius Hermogenes, a singing teacher who fancied himself a talented writer, but whose lack of skill was readily apparent. He became a vehement critic of his contemporary, Horace, whose satires were a particular object of Hermogenes' ire. He might be the same person as the singer Tigellius Sardus, mentioned by Cicero, but in some instances, Horace refers to "Tigellius", and in others "Hermogenes", as though distinguishing them.
- Tigellia Restuta, buried in a second-century tomb at Rome, built by her son, Marcus Tigellius Restutus.
- Marcus Tigellius Restutus, dedicated a second-century tomb at Rome for his mother, Tigellia Restuta.
- Tigellia M. f. Potestas, buried at Rome.

== See also ==
- List of Roman gentes

== Bibliography ==
- Marcus Tullius Cicero, Epistulae ad Familiares.
- Quintus Horatius Flaccus (Horace), Satirae (Satires).
- Dictionary of Greek and Roman Biography and Mythology, William Smith, ed., Little, Brown and Company, Boston (1849).
- Theodor Mommsen et alii, Corpus Inscriptionum Latinarum (The Body of Latin Inscriptions, abbreviated CIL), Berlin-Brandenburgische Akademie der Wissenschaften (1853–present).
- George Davis Chase, "The Origin of Roman Praenomina", in Harvard Studies in Classical Philology, vol. VIII, pp. 103–184 (1897).
- Paul von Rohden, Elimar Klebs, & Hermann Dessau, Prosopographia Imperii Romani (The Prosopography of the Roman Empire, abbreviated PIR), Berlin (1898).
