= Burriena gens =

Roman family

The gens Burriena was a Roman family during the late Republic. It is known chiefly from a single individual, Gaius Burrienus, praetor urbanus about 82 B.C.

== See also ==
- List of Roman gentes
