= Arpineia gens =

Ancient Roman family

The gens Arpineia or Arpinia was an obscure plebeian family at ancient Rome. It is known chiefly from a single individual, Gaius Arpineius, an eques in Caesar's army during the Gallic Wars.

== Origin ==
The nomen Arpineius belongs to a class of gentilicia formed using the suffix -eius, typically formed from words or names ending in -as. The root of the nomen is the cognomen Arpinas, a surname indicating a relationship to the city of Arpinum in southern Latium, whence the ancestor of this family probably came.

== Members ==
- Gaius Arpineius, an eques, and a friend of Quintus Titurius Sabinus, who was sent to confer with Ambiorix in 54 BC.
- Publius Arpinius, a potter whose maker's mark appears on pottery from Leontopolis in Egypt.

== See also ==
- List of Roman gentes

== Bibliography ==
- Gaius Julius Caesar, Commentarii de Bello Gallico (Commentaries on the Gallic War).
- Dictionary of Greek and Roman Biography and Mythology, William Smith, ed., Little, Brown and Company, Boston (1849).
- Theodor Mommsen et alii, Corpus Inscriptionum Latinarum (The Body of Latin Inscriptions, abbreviated CIL), Berlin-Brandenburgische Akademie der Wissenschaften (1853–present).
- George Davis Chase, "The Origin of Roman Praenomina", in Harvard Studies in Classical Philology, vol. VIII, pp. 103–184 (1897).
