= Stellia gens =

Ancient Roman family

The gens Stellia was an obscure plebeian family at ancient Rome. No members of this gens are mentioned in history, but a few are known from inscriptions.

== Origin ==
The nomen Stellius is derived from the Latin Stella, a star, which sometimes appears as a cognomen, in its original form, or in the derivative form Stellio. It belongs to a large class of gentilicia derived from the names of familiar objects.

== Members ==
This list includes abbreviated praenomina. For an explanation of this practice, see filiation.

- Stellia Agathe, dedicated a tomb at Casinum in Latium for her husband, Cornelius Phoebus.
- Stellius Novellus Amaranthus, dedicated a tomb at Messana in Sicilia for his son, Cytisus, aged ten.
- Gaius Stellius C. f. Primigenius, dedicated a tomb at Saepinum in Samnium for his friend, Gaius Neratius Primio.
- Quintus Stellius Q. f. Vopiscus, made an offering to Diana Lucifera at Philippi in Macedonia, dating between the first and third centuries.

== See also ==
- List of Roman gentes

== Bibliography ==
- Titus Livius (Livy), History of Rome.
- Publius Papinius Statius, Silvae.
- Marcus Valerius Martialis (Martial), Epigrammata (Epigrams).
- Publius Cornelius Tacitus, Annales.
- Theodor Mommsen et alii, Corpus Inscriptionum Latinarum (The Body of Latin Inscriptions, abbreviated CIL), Berlin-Brandenburgische Akademie der Wissenschaften (1853–present).
- René Cagnat et alii, L'Année épigraphique (The Year in Epigraphy, abbreviated AE), Presses Universitaires de France (1888–present).
- George Davis Chase, "The Origin of Roman Praenomina", in Harvard Studies in Classical Philology, vol. VIII, pp. 103–184 (1897).
- D.P. Simpson, Cassell's Latin and English Dictionary, Macmillan Publishing Company, New York (1963).
- Irma Bitto, Le Iscrizioni Greche e Latine di Messina (The Greek and Latin Inscriptions of Messina), Università degli Studi di Messina (2001).
