= Tursidia gens =

Ancient Roman family

The gens Tursidia was an obscure plebeian family at ancient Rome. No members of this gens are mentioned by Roman writers, but a few are known from inscriptions. Although they gained admission to the Roman Senate, none of them rose higher than the rank of aedile.

== Origin ==
The nomen Tursidius belongs to a class of gentilicia originally formed from cognomina ending in -idus. Over time, -idius came to be regarded as a regular gentile-forming suffix, and was applied to form nomina in cases where it had no etymological justification. The earliest Tursidii known from epigraphy came from Spoletium in Umbria, perhaps this family's place of origin.

== Members ==
This list includes abbreviated praenomina. For an explanation of this practice, see filiation.

- Gaius Tursidius C. f., named in a sepulchral inscription from Spoletium in Umbria, dating from the Augustan era.
- Gaius Tursidius Maximus, one of the quattuorvirs at Spoletium, held the aedilician power at an early age. He was buried at Spoletium, aged twenty years, five months, in a tomb dating from the first half of the first century.
- Gaius Tursidius, a soldier in the sixth cohort of the praetorian guard at Rome in AD 144.
- Gaius Tursidius Liberalis, a soldier in the fifth cohort of the vigiles at Rome in AD 205.
- Quintus Tursidius Nartinus, a soldier in the fifth cohort of the vigiles at Rome in AD 205.
- Tursidius Manilianus Tituleius Aelianus, a man of senatorial rank, was a tribune laticlavus in the Legio XIV Gemina, served as quaestor in the province of Achaia, legate in Crete and Cyrenaica, and held the office of plebeian aedile at Rome. He was an unsuccessful candidate for the praetorship. His cursus honorum is recorded on his sarcophagus, dating between AD 240 and 300.

=== Undated Tursidii ===
- Tursidia L. f, buried at Augusta Emerita in Lusitania.

== See also ==
- List of Roman gentes

== Bibliography ==
- Theodor Mommsen et alii, Corpus Inscriptionum Latinarum (The Body of Latin Inscriptions, abbreviated CIL), Berlin-Brandenburgische Akademie der Wissenschaften (1853–present).
- René Cagnat et alii, L'Année épigraphique (The Year in Epigraphy, abbreviated AE), Presses Universitaires de France (1888–present).
- George Davis Chase, "The Origin of Roman Praenomina", in Harvard Studies in Classical Philology, vol. VIII, pp. 103–184 (1897).
- Hispania Epigraphica (Epigraphy of Spain), Madrid (1989–present).
