= Cottia gens =

The gens Cottia was a plebeian family of equestrian rank. It is known chiefly from the brothers Marcus and Publius Cottius, equites of Tauromenium in Sicily. They served as witnesses against Verres.

== See also ==
- List of Roman gentes
