= Istacidia gens =

Ancient Roman family

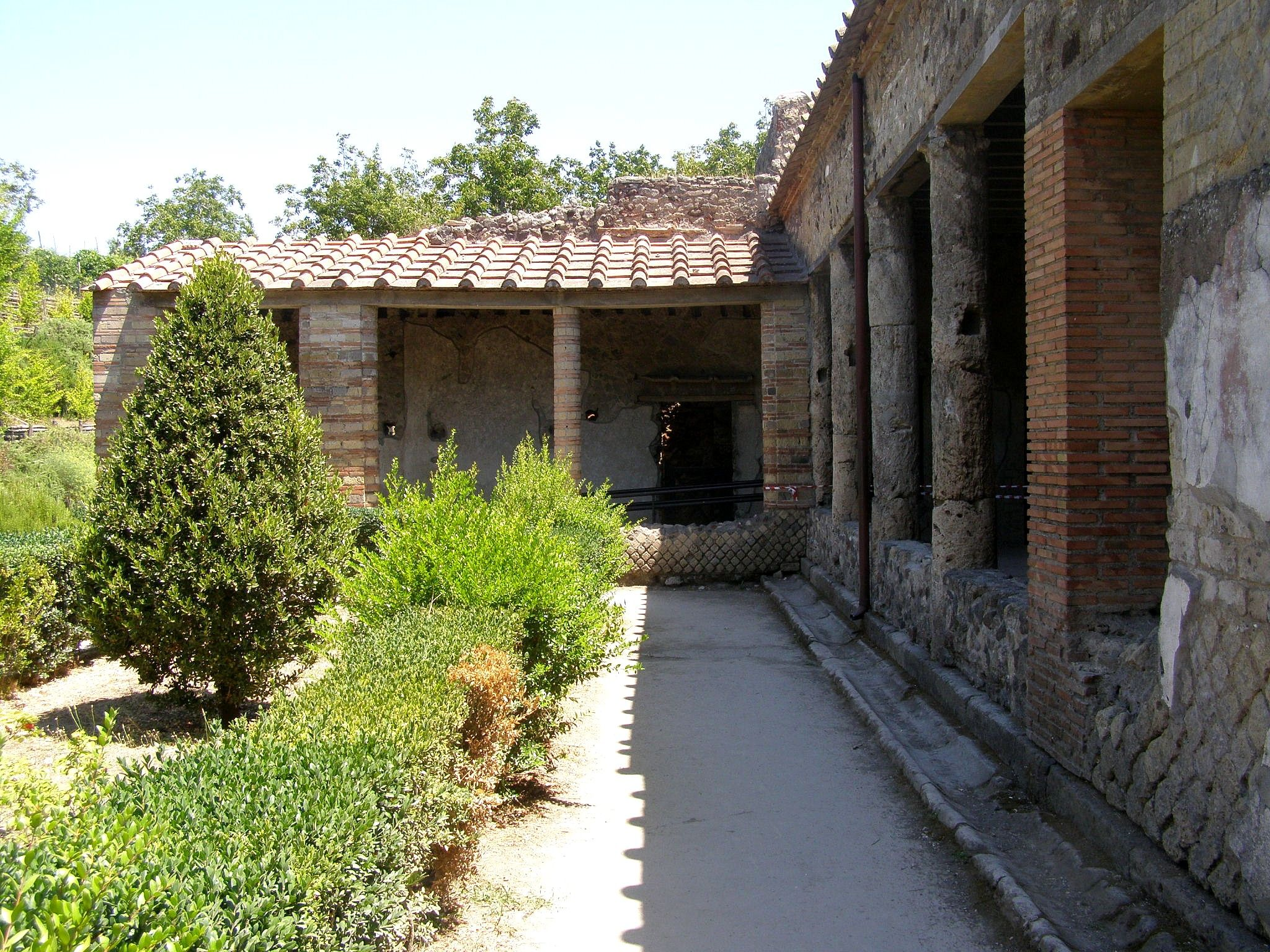
The "Villa of the Mysteries", home of the Istacidii at Pompeii.

The gens Istacidia was an obscure Roman family at Pompeii. No members of this gens are mentioned by ancient writers, but a number are known from inscriptions. Numerius Istacidius Cilix was one of the municipal duumvirs of Pompeii around the beginning of the first century. The Istacidii were apparently the residents of the famous "Villa of the Mysteries", and a large sepulchre found along the bay road contains several tombs for members of this family.

== Origin ==
The Istacidii were most likely of Campanian origin, as all of the inscriptions of this family are from Pompeii, and one of them bore the surname Campanus, one of a class of surnames derived from place names, and usually indicating a person's place of origin.

== Praenomina ==
The main praenomina of the Istacidii were Numerius and Lucius, accounting for all of the Istacidii whose praenomina are known, except for one instance of Marcus, found in a filiation. Lucius and Marcus were among the most common of all Roman names at all periods of history, while Numerius was much more distinctive; while not actually rare, it was typical in families of Oscan origin.

== Branches and cognomina ==
The inscriptions of the Istacidii at Pompeii suggest that they constituted a single family, together with their freedmen. Several inscriptions of this gens do not include a cognomen, and none of the surnames of this gens appear to have been hereditary. Cilix, a surname originally applied to someone from Cilicia, gives the appearance of the type of name belonging to a freedman, and indicating his place of origin; but as it belonged to one of the duumviri, it may instead have stemmed from his trading connections.

== Members ==
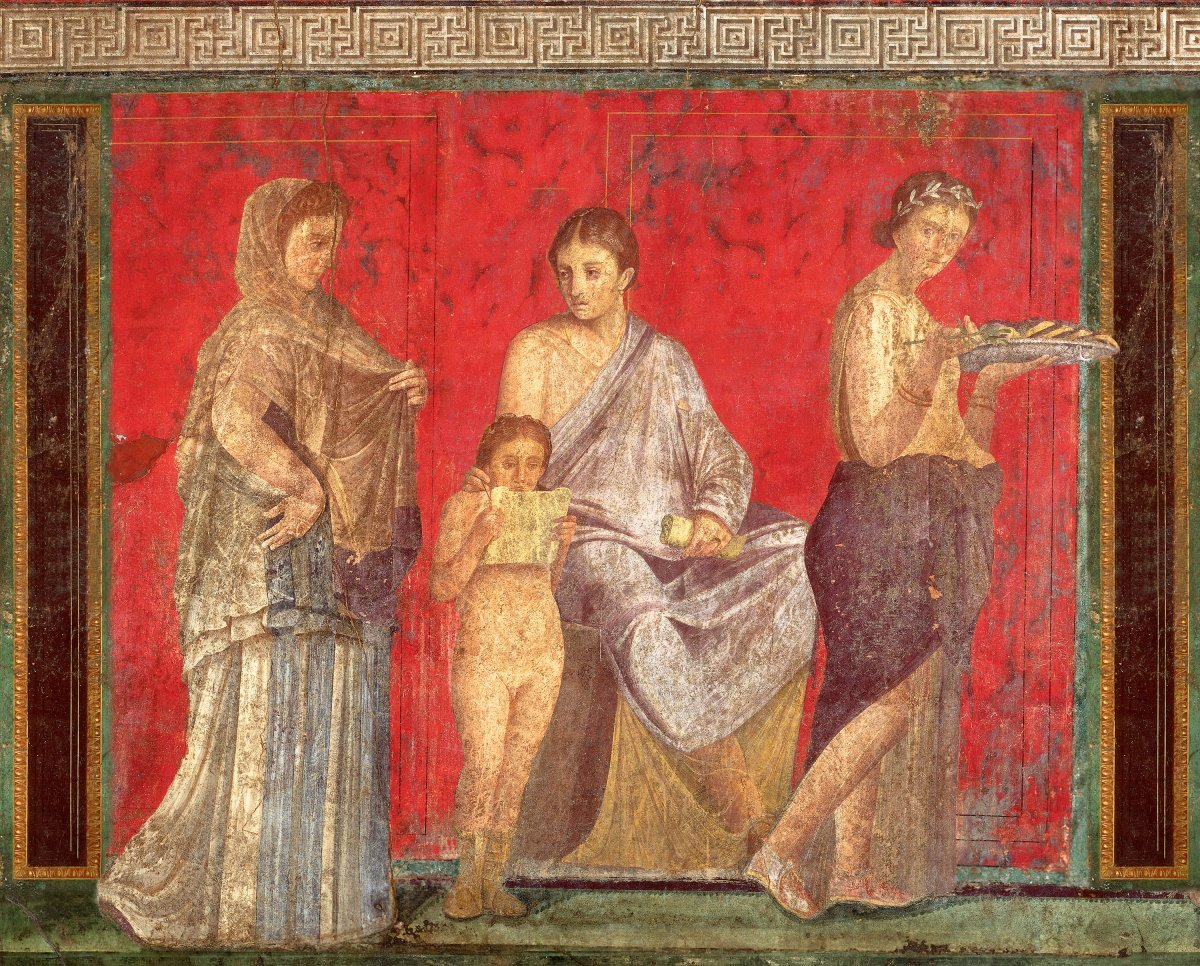
Fresco from the "Villa of the Mysteries".

This list includes abbreviated praenomina. For an explanation of this practice, see filiation.

- Istacidia L. f., named in an inscription from Pompeii in Campania.
- Istacidia M. f., the widow of Publius Tintirius, was buried at Pompeii between 30 BC and AD 20, in a tomb dedicated by her daughter, Tintiria.
- Lucius Istacidius, named in a first-century inscription from Pompeii.
- Lucius Istacidius, named in two graffiti from Pompeii.
- Numerius Istacidius Amicus, a money-lender at Pompeii in AD 55, according to an inscription indicating that he was owed the sum of 7,390 sestertii.
- Numerius Istacidius Campanus, named in an inscription from Pompeii, dating between AD 30 and 50.
- Numerius Istacidius N. f. Cilix, one of the municipal duumvirs at Pompeii, according to an inscription dating between 7 BC and AD 20, in which he dedicated a section of public seating for the amphitheatre.
- Istacidius Crisyrus, named in an inscription from Pompeii, dating between AD 30 and 50.
- Lucius Istacidius Eu[...], named in an inscription from Pompeii.
- Numerius Istacidius Helenus, a freedman buried at Pompeii, in a tomb dating between AD 30 and 60, along with Numerius Istacidius Januarius and Mesonia Satulla.
- Numerius Istacidius Januarius, a freedman buried at Pompeii, in a tomb dating between AD 30 and 60, along with Numerius Istacidius Helenus and Mesonia Satulla.
- Numerius Istacidius Nyptnus, named in an inscription from Pompeii.
- Numerius Istacidius Orion, named in an inscription from Pompeii.
- Istacidia N. f. Rufilla, perhaps the daughter of Cilix, was a priestess at Pompeii.
- Numerius Istacidius N. f. S[...] Menophilus, buried at Pompeii, in a tomb dating between AD 30 and 50.
- Istacidia Scapis, named in an inscription from Pompeii, dating between AD 30 and 60.
- Lucius Istacidius Zosimus, a freedman of the Istacidii, probably acquired the Villa of the Mysteries from his former masters following the earthquake of 62.

== See also ==
- List of Roman gentes

== Bibliography ==
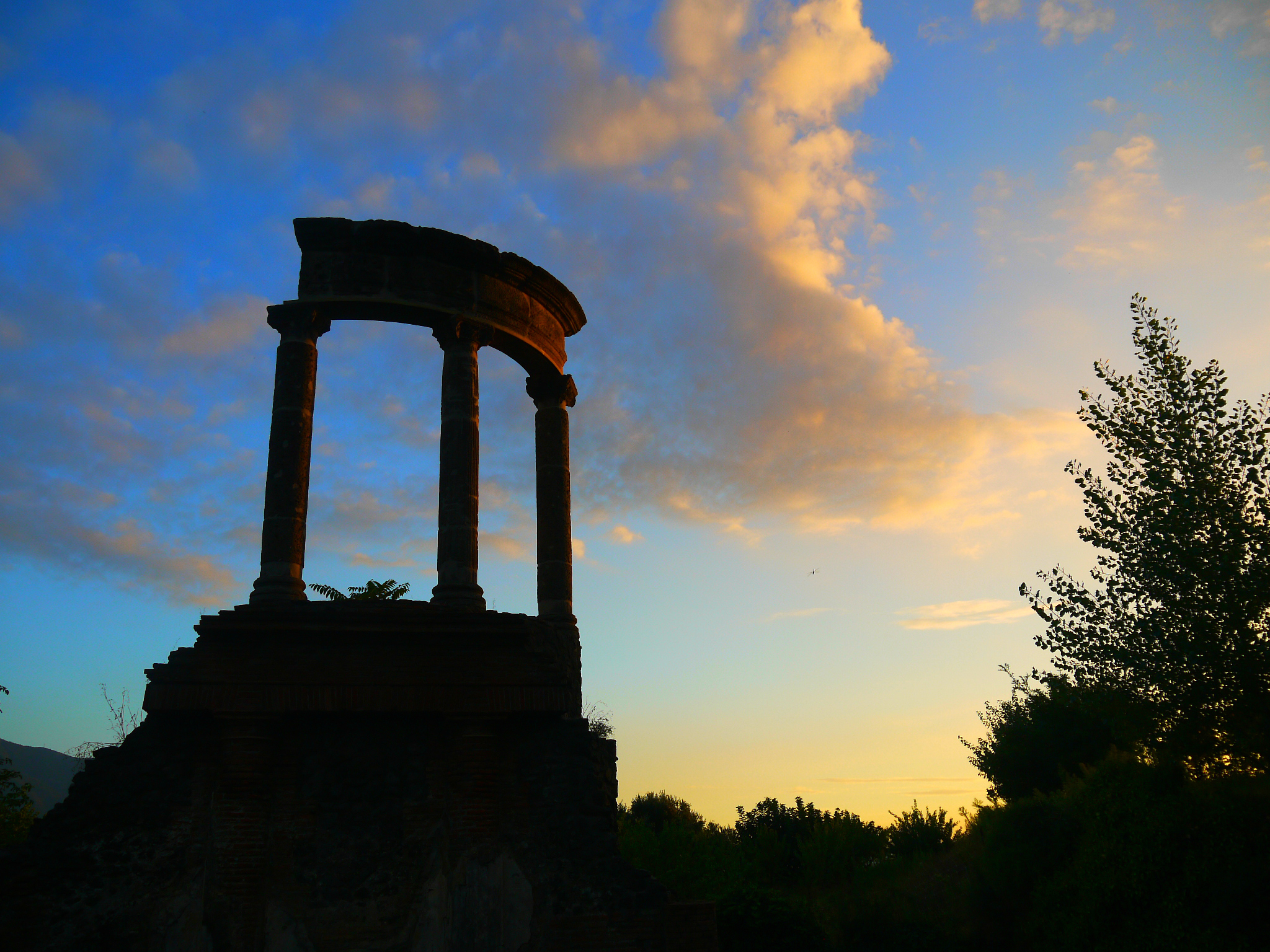
Surviving portion of the tomb of the Istacidii, on the road to Herculaneum.

- Theodor Mommsen et alii, Corpus Inscriptionum Latinarum (The Body of Latin Inscriptions, abbreviated CIL), Berlin-Brandenburgische Akademie der Wissenschaften (1853–present).
- George Davis Chase, "The Origin of Roman Praenomina", in Harvard Studies in Classical Philology, vol. VIII, pp. 103–184 (1897).
- August Mau, Pompeii: Its Life and Art (Francis W. Kelsey, trans.), MacMillan, London (1907).
- Mary L. Gordon, "The Ordo of Pompeii", in The Journal of Roman Studies, vol. xvii., pp. 165–183 (1927).
- Alison E. and M.G.L. Cooley, Pompeii and Herculaneum: a Sourcebook, Routledge (2013).
