= Iasdia gens =

Ancient Roman family

The gens Iasdia was an obscure plebeian family at ancient Rome. Hardly any members of this gens appear in history, but a few are known from inscriptions. They were briefly prominent during the first half of the third century.

== Members ==
- (Gaius?) Iasdius Domitianus, having held numerous offices, including those of curule aedile, quaestor of Achaia, praetor, legate of the Legio XIV Gemina, governor of Pannonia Inferior, and governor of Roman Dacia from circa AD 222 to 235. He was buried at Rome about 238 or 239, with a monument dedicated by his sons, Iasdius Domitianus and Iasdius Honoratianus.
- Iasdius Domitianus, son of the governor Domitianus, joined with his brother, Honoratianus, in dedicating a monument at Rome for their father.
- Lucius Iasdius Aemilianus Honoriatianus, together with his brother, Domitianus, dedicated a monument at Rome to their father, the governor Iasdius Domitianus. He was tribune of the plebs in AD 240, and is recorded as magister of the Arval Brethren in 241.

== See also ==
- List of Roman gentes

== Bibliography ==
- Theodor Mommsen et alii, Corpus Inscriptionum Latinarum (The Body of Latin Inscriptions, abbreviated CIL), Berlin-Brandenburgische Akademie der Wissenschaften (1853–present).
- René Cagnat et alii, L'Année épigraphique (The Year in Epigraphy, abbreviated AE), Presses Universitaires de France (1888–present).
- Paul von Rohden, Elimar Klebs, & Hermann Dessau, Prosopographia Imperii Romani (The Prosopography of the Roman Empire, abbreviated PIR), Berlin (1898).
