= Plaguleia gens =

Ancient Roman family

The gens Plaguleia was an obscure plebeian family at ancient Rome. Only one member of this gens is mentioned by ancient writers, although a few others are known from inscriptions.

== Origin ==
The nomen Plaguleius belongs to a large class of names ending in -eius, which is typically, although not exclusively of Oscan derivation. The only similar word in Latin seems to be plagulus, a curtain, suggesting that the nomen could possibly be occupational, referring to a curtain-maker, although that would more regularly be plagularius.

== Members ==
This list includes abbreviated praenomina. For an explanation of this practice, see filiation.

- Plaguleius, a partisan of Publius Clodius Pulcher.
- Gaius Plaguleius Ampliatus, built a tomb at Rome for his mother, Claudia Psyche, and his wife, Julia Hermione.
- Gaius Plaguleius C. l. Fortunatus, a freedman buried at Rome between AD 1 and 30.
- Plaguleia Glaphyra, buried at Rome, in a tomb built by Lucius Licinius Anteros.
- Plaguleia A. (f.?) Prima, buried at Rome.
- Gaius Plaguleius Ɔ l. Trophimus, a freedman named in an inscription from Rome.

== See also ==
- List of Roman gentes

== Bibliography ==
- Marcus Tullius Cicero, De Domo Sua.
- Dictionary of Greek and Roman Biography and Mythology, William Smith, ed., Little, Brown and Company, Boston (1849).
- Theodor Mommsen et alii, Corpus Inscriptionum Latinarum (The Body of Latin Inscriptions, abbreviated CIL), Berlin-Brandenburgische Akademie der Wissenschaften (1853–present).
- George Davis Chase, "The Origin of Roman Praenomina", in Harvard Studies in Classical Philology, vol. VIII (1897).
- John C. Traupman, The New College Latin & English Dictionary, Bantam Books, New York (1995).
