= Rancia gens =

Ancient Roman family

The gens Rancia was an obscure plebeian family of ancient Rome. No members of this gens are mentioned by Roman writers, but several are known from inscriptions.

== Members ==
This list includes abbreviated praenomina. For an explanation of this practice, see filiation.

- Quintus Rancius Q. l., a freedman buried at Rome, in a tomb dating from the latter half of the first century BC.
- Rancia Antiochis, buried at Rome, in a tomb built by her husband, Titus Pomponius Diodorus, dating from the latter half of the first century.
- Quintus Rancius Q. l. Dorotheus, a freedman named in an Augustan-era inscription from Rome.
- Quintus Rancius Epaphroditus, buried at Rome, together with his wife, Rancia Thallusa, in a tomb dating from the first half of the second century.
- Rancia Harmonia, dedicated a tomb at Rome for her husband, Marcus Alphius Romanus.
- Rancia Thallusa, buried at Rome, together with her husband, Quintus Rancius Epaphroditus.
- Rancia Tryphera, buried at Rome, together with Gaius Julius Pontianus, probably her husband.

== See also ==
- List of Roman gentes

== Bibliography ==
- René Cagnat et alii, L'Année épigraphique (The Year in Epigraphy, abbreviated AE), Presses Universitaires de France (1888–present).
- Theodor Mommsen et alii, Corpus Inscriptionum Latinarum (The Body of Latin Inscriptions, abbreviated CIL), Berlin-Brandenburgische Akademie der Wissenschaften (1853–present).
