= Cestronia gens =

Ancient Roman family

The gens Cestronia was an obscure plebeian family of ancient Rome. No members of this gens are mentioned by Roman writers, but several are known from inscriptions.

== Members ==
- Decimus Cestronius, dedicated a tomb at the site of modern Marano dei Marsi, formerly part of Sabinum, dating from the first half of the first century, for Gaius Cestronius Tappo.
- Gaius Cestronius Tappo, buried at the site of modern Marano dei Marsi, in a tomb dedicated by Decimus Cestronius, dating from the first half of the first century.
- Gaius Cestronius Severianus, buried at Thugga in Africa, aged sixty-five, in a tomb dating from the first half of the second century.
- Lucius Cestronius Fortunatus Egrilianus, a boy buried in a late second- or third-century tomb at Thugga, aged nine years, five (months?).

=== Undated Cestronii ===
- Cestronia Fortunata, buried at Thugga, aged forty.
- Cestronius Victor, a child buried at Thugga, aged two.
- Cestronia Victoria, buried at the site of present-day El Ma El Biodh, formerly part of Numidia, aged forty-two.

== See also ==
- List of Roman gentes

== Bibliography ==
- Samir Aounallah et alii, Chroniques d'Archéologie Maghrébine, Revue de l'Association historique et archéologique de Carthage (2022).
- René Cagnat et alii, L'Année épigraphique (The Year in Epigraphy, abbreviated AE), Presses Universitaires de France (1888–present).
- Antonio Ibba, Uchi Maius 2: Le iscrizioni, Sassari (2006).
- Mustapha Khanoussi, Louis Maurin, Mourir à Dougga: Receuil des inscriptions funéraires (Dying in Dougga: a Compendium of Funerary Inscriptions), Bordeaux, Tunis (2002).
- Alfred Merlin, Inscriptions Latines de La Tunisie (Latin Inscriptions from Tunisia), Fondation Dourlans, Paris (1944).
- Theodor Mommsen et alii, Corpus Inscriptionum Latinarum (The Body of Latin Inscriptions, abbreviated CIL), Berlin-Brandenburgische Akademie der Wissenschaften (1853–present).
