= Caeparia gens =

The gens Caeparia was a Roman family during the late Republic. It is best known from two individuals: Marcus Caeparius of Tarracina, one of the conspirators of Catiline, who was supposed to induce the people of rural Apulia to revolt, in 63 BC; and another Marcus Caeparius, mentioned by Cicero in 46 BC.

== Origin ==
The Nomen Caeparius is Latin for "a trader in onions"

== See also ==
- List of Roman gentes
