= Carteia gens =

Roman family

The gens Carteia was a Roman family towards the end of the Republic. It is best remembered for a single individual, Lucius Carteius, a friend of Gaius Cassius Longinus, who was with Cassius in Syria in 43 BC.

== See also ==
- List of Roman gentes
