= Balventia gens =

The gens Balventia was a Roman family during the late Republic. It is known chiefly from a single individual, Titus Balventius, a primus pilus in the command of Quintus Titurius Sabinus in Gaul. He was severely wounded in the attack made by Ambiorix in 54 B.C.

== See also ==
- List of Roman gentes
