= Saenia gens =

Ancient Roman family

The gens Saenia was a plebeian family at ancient Rome. Members of this gens are first mentioned in the final century of the Republic, and Lucius Saenius attained the consulship in 30 BC.

== Branches and cognomina ==
All of the cognomina borne by the Saenii who appear in history seem to be personal surnames. They included the ubiquitous Severus, stern or severe, Donatus, gifted, and probably Balbinus, a diminutive of Balbus, one who stammers. Pompeianus, borne by one of the family, probably indicates that he was descended from the Pompeia gens through one of his maternal ancestors.

== Members ==
This list includes abbreviated praenomina. For an explanation of this practice, see filiation.

- Lucius Saenius, a member of the Roman senate at the time that the conspiracy of Catiline was uncovered, in 63 BC. He might be the same Lucius Saenius who was consul in 30 BC, but more likely his father.
- Lucius Saenius L. f., probably surnamed Balbinus, (Note: Appian mentions the consul Balbinus, not otherwise known, who had been proscribed by the triumvirs in 43 BC, but subsequently restored to favour. Given the timing of his mention, the consul in question is almost certainly Saenius.) consul suffectus from the Kalends of November to the end of 30 BC, as the final colleague of Octavian that year. He was the author of the lex Saenia by which Octavian appointed a number of new patricians in the following year.
- Gaius Saenius Severus, consul suffectus from the Kalends of July in AD 126.
- Quintus Saenius Q. f. Pompeianus, conductor quattuor publicorum for the province of Africa, probably in the time of the Antonines. His wife was Fuficia Clymena, and he had two freedmen, Prosdectus and Trypherus, whose names appear on his tomb at Rome.
- Marcus Saenius Donatus, one of the Arval Brethren from at least AD 219 to 238.

== See also ==
- List of Roman gentes

== Bibliography ==
- Gaius Sallustius Crispus (Sallust), Bellum Catilinae (The Conspiracy of Catiline).
- Publius Cornelius Tacitus, Annales.
- Appianus Alexandrinus (Appian), Bellum Civile (The Civil War).
- Lucius Cassius Dio Cocceianus (Cassius Dio), Roman History.
- Dictionary of Greek and Roman Biography and Mythology, William Smith, ed., Little, Brown and Company, Boston (1849).
- Theodor Mommsen et alii, Corpus Inscriptionum Latinarum (The Body of Latin Inscriptions, abbreviated CIL), Berlin-Brandenburgische Akademie der Wissenschaften (1853–present).
- René Cagnat et alii, L'Année épigraphique (The Year in Epigraphy, abbreviated AE), Presses Universitaires de France (1888–present).
- T. Robert S. Broughton, The Magistrates of the Roman Republic, American Philological Association (1952–1986).
- Zeitschrift für Papyrologie und Epigraphik (Journal of Papyrology and Epigraphy, abbreviated ZPE), (1987).
- Alison E. Cooley, The Cambridge Manual of Latin Epigraphy, Cambridge University Press (2012).
