= Tariolena gens =

Ancient Roman family

The gens Tariolena was an obscure plebeian family of Roman times. No members of this gens appear in history, but several are known from inscriptions.

== Origin ==
The nomen Tariolenus belongs to a class of gentilicia formed using the suffix -enus, regularly formed from other nomina, but occasionally from place-names. Names of this class are frequently associated with families of Umbrian origin, but were also characteristic of Cisalpine Gaul, and particularly of Venetia and Histria, where the inscriptions of the Tarioleni are found.

== Members ==
This list includes abbreviated praenomina. For an explanation of this practice, see filiation.

- Lucius Tariolenus Princeps, named in two inscriptions from Aquileia in Venetia and Histria, may have been the master of the freedwomen Tariolena Fausta and Tariolena Doris.
- Tariolena L. l. Doris, a freedwoman named in an inscription from Aquileia, together with the freedwoman Tariolena Fausta, and Lucius Tariolenus Princeps, perhaps their former master.
- Tariolena L. l. Fausta, a freedwoman named in an inscription from Aquileia, together with the freedwoman Tariolena Doris, and Lucius Tariolenus Princeps, perhaps their former master.
- Lucius Tariolenus L. l. Hilarus, a freedman buried at Aquileia, together with the freedman Lucius Tariolenus Liccaeus, in a tomb dating from the latter half of the first century BC.
- Lucius Tariolenus L. l. Liccaeus, a freedman buried at Aquileia, together with the freedman Lucius Tariolenus Hilarus, in a tomb dating from the latter half of the first century BC.

== See also ==
- List of Roman gentes

== Bibliography ==
- Theodor Mommsen et alii, Corpus Inscriptionum Latinarum (The Body of Latin Inscriptions, abbreviated CIL), Berlin-Brandenburgische Akademie der Wissenschaften (1853–present).
- George Davis Chase, "The Origin of Roman Praenomina", in Harvard Studies in Classical Philology, vol. VIII, pp. 103–184 (1897).
- Olli Salomies, "Prolegomena to a Study of the Nomina Ending in –(i)enus", in Antichità Altoadriatiche, Centro di Antichità Altoadriatiche, Editreg di Fabio Prenc, Trieste, vol. LXXXV, pp. 615–631 (2016).
