= Sepunia gens =

Ancient Roman family

The gens Sepunia was an obscure plebeian family at ancient Rome. No members of this gens are mentioned by ancient writers, but several were municipal officers of towns in Latium, Samnium, and Campania, and others are known from inscriptions.

== Members ==
This list includes abbreviated praenomina. For an explanation of this practice, see filiation.

- Gaius Sepunius, named in an inscription from Pompeii in Campania.
- Lucius Sepunius L. f., one of the municipal duumvirs at Aeclanum in Samnium, according to an inscription dating to the second quarter of the first century BC.
- Marcus Sepunius, the master of Ascla, a slave at Minturnae in Latium about 66 BC.
- Titus Sepunius T. f., one of the curatores viarium at Rome early in the first century BC.
- Titus Sepunius T. f., one of the duumvirs at Venusia in Samnium in 30 BC.
- Sepunius Alexander, mentioned in a first-century inscription from Rome.
- Sepunius Clarus, a decurion at Antium in Latium in AD 44.
- Lucius Sepunius Ɔ. l. Faustus, a freedman buried at Rome in the first half of the first century AD.
- Sepunia Gorge, a woman buried at Thenae in Africa Proconsularis, aged thirty.
- Marcus Sepunius Nicephor, buried at Rome, in a tomb dating to the first half of the first century.
- Titus Sepunius T. f. Postumus, a centurion in the fifteenth legion, buried at Mutina in Cisalpine Gaul, in a tomb built by his sister, Sepunia Secunda.
- Lucius Sepunius L. f. Sandilianus, one of the duumviri jure dicundo at Pompeii in the latter part of the first century BC. He was given a public funeral toward the end of the century, or early in the first century AD.
- Sepunia T. f. Secunda, built a tomb at Mutina for her brother, the centurion Titus Sepunius Postumus, and another person, Lucius Pugilius Expectatus.
- Marcus Sepunius M. l. Statius, a freedman at Minturnae, mentioned in an inscription dating to the first half of the first century BC.

== See also ==
- List of Roman gentes

== Bibliography ==
- Theodor Mommsen et alii, Corpus Inscriptionum Latinarum (The Body of Latin Inscriptions, abbreviated CIL), Berlin-Brandenburgische Akademie der Wissenschaften (1853–present).
- Notizie degli Scavi di Antichità (News of Excavations from Antiquity, abbreviated NSA), Accademia dei Lincei (1876–present).
- Bulletin Archéologique du Comité des Travaux Historiques et Scientifiques (Archaeological Bulletin of the Committee on Historic and Scientific Works, abbreviated BCTH), Imprimerie Nationale, Paris (1885–1973).
- René Cagnat et alii, L'Année épigraphique (The Year in Epigraphy, abbreviated AE), Presses Universitaires de France (1888–present).
- Licia Vlad Borelli, Un Impegno per Pompei, Mailand (1983).
