= Quirinia gens =

Family in ancient Rome

The gens Quirinia was an obscure plebeian family at ancient Rome. No members of this gens appear in history, but several are known from inscriptions.

== Origin ==
The nomen Quirinius belongs to a class of gentilicia derived from other names ending in -inus. Its root, the surname Quirinus, was an old Sabine word, apparently derived from quiris, a spear or javelin. As a cognomen, it was applied to Romulus, the legendary founder and first King of Rome, and it was later applied to other persons, including a family of the Sulpicia gens, and deities, including Mars, Janus, and the deified Augustus.

== Members ==
This list includes abbreviated praenomina. For an explanation of this practice, see filiation.

- Lucius Quirinius Amerimnus, dedicated a tomb at Rome to Sentia Cleopatra, her husband, Appuleius Protus, and their son, Sentius Protus, dated to the late first or early second century AD.
- Quirinia M. l. Ge, a freedwoman, buried along the Via Latina in Rome, together with Marcus Quirinius Pamphilus, in a tomb dating to the first century BC.
- Marcus Quirinius Hermes, client of Sextus Vestilius Lycysus and Quirinia Januaria, to whom he dedicated a tomb at Salernum in Campania.
- Quirinius Hilarus, named in an inscription from Rome.
- Quirinia Januaria, buried at Salernum, aged forty-five, together with Sextus Vestilius Lycysus, in a tomb dedicated by their client, Marcus Quirinius Hermes.
- Marcus Quirinius Pamphilus, buried along the Via Latina, together with Quirinia Ge, in a tomb dating to the first century BC.
- Gaius Quirinius C. f. Proculus, named in an inscription from Aveia in Samnium.
- Lucius Quirinius Tuscus, named in an inscription from Rome.

== See also ==
- List of Roman gentes

== Bibliography ==
- Dionysius of Halicarnassus, Romaike Archaiologia (Roman Antiquities).
- Dictionary of Greek and Roman Biography and Mythology, William Smith, ed., Little, Brown and Company, Boston (1849).
- Theodor Mommsen et alii, Corpus Inscriptionum Latinarum (The Body of Latin Inscriptions, abbreviated CIL), Berlin-Brandenburgische Akademie der Wissenschaften (1853–present).
- George Davis Chase, "The Origin of Roman Praenomina", in Harvard Studies in Classical Philology, vol. VIII (1897).
- Massimo Pedrazzoli, Iscrizioni e Vestigia della Via Latina (Inscriptions and Remains of the Via Latina), Rome (1970).
