= Triccia gens =

Ancient Roman family

The gens Triccia was an obscure plebeian family at ancient Rome. No members of this gens are mentioned by Roman writers, but a few are known from inscriptions.

== Members ==
- Lucius Triccius Epaphroditus, buried in the first-century sepulchre of Decciana Olympias and her family at Canusium in Apulia.
- Lucius Triccius Apollinaris, a man of duumviral rank at Canusium in AD 223. Perhaps the father of Lucius Triccius Apollinaris, junior, a youth named in the same inscription.
- Lucius Triccius Apollinaris, junior, a young man living at Canusium in AD 223, listed amongst the praetextati. Perhaps the son of Lucius Triccius Apollinaris, a man of duumviral rank named in the same inscription.

== See also ==
- List of Roman gentes

== Bibliography ==
- Theodor Mommsen et alii, Corpus Inscriptionum Latinarum (The Body of Latin Inscriptions, abbreviated CIL), Berlin-Brandenburgische Akademie der Wissenschaften (1853–present).
- René Cagnat et alii, L'Année épigraphique (The Year in Epigraphy, abbreviated AE), Presses Universitaires de France (1888–present).
