= Castrinia gens =

Roman gens active during late Republic

The gens Castrinia or Castronia was a Roman family during the late Republic. It is best known a single individual, Lucius Castrinius Paetus, mentioned in a letter from Marcus Caelius Rufus to Cicero in 51 BC. He is probably the same person as Lucius Castronius Paetus, the leading man in the municipium of Luca, whom Cicero recommended to Brutus in 46 BC.

== See also ==
- List of Roman gentes
