= Cantilia gens =

The gens Cantilia was a Roman family during the late Republic. It is known chiefly from a single individual, Lucius Cantilius, secretary of the pontiffs in 216 B.C., during the Second Punic War.

After the catastrophic defeat of the Romans by Hannibal at the Battle of Cannae, Rome was beset by ill omens and superstitious dread. It was soon discovered that two of the Vestal Virgins, Opimia and Floronia, had been debauched. One of them took her own life, while the other was buried alive at the Colline Gate, which was the traditional punishment for her offense. Cantilius, who had debauched Floronia, was scourged to death in the comitium by the Pontifex Maximus.

== See also ==
- List of Roman gentes
