= Tifernia gens =

Ancient Roman family

The gens Tifernia was an obscure plebeian family at ancient Rome. No members of this gens appear in history, but several are known from inscriptions.

== Origin ==
All of the Tifernii known from inscriptions from outside of Rome came from Umbria, including at least three from the town of Tifernum Tiberinum, Tifernum on the Tiber. Unless the town was named after the Tifernia gens, the Tifernii must have obtained their nomen from their town of origin.

== Members ==
This list includes abbreviated praenomina. For an explanation of this practice, see filiation.

- Gaius Tifernius C. f. Sabinus, a youth buried at Tifernum Tiberinum in Umbria, aged fifteen, in a tomb dating from the early first century.
- Gaius Tifernius Alcibiades, a soldier serving in the fifth cohort of the vigiles at Rome in AD 210.
- Lucius Tifernius L. f. Verus, a native of Fanum Fortunae in Umbria, was a soldier in the twelfth urban cohort at Rome in AD 218.

=== Undated Tifernii ===
- Tifernius Prudens, the father of Tifernia Sabina, a woman buried at Tifernum Tiberinum.
- Tifernia Sabina, daughter of Tifernius Prudens, buried at Tifernum Tiberinum, in a tomb dedicated by Venia and Aruntia Ampiana.
- Tifernius Severus, dedicated a tomb at Rome for his mother, Satellia Severa.

== See also ==
- List of Roman gentes

== Bibliography ==
- Theodor Mommsen et alii, Corpus Inscriptionum Latinarum (The Body of Latin Inscriptions, abbreviated CIL), Berlin-Brandenburgische Akademie der Wissenschaften (1853–present).
- Dictionary of Greek and Roman Geography, William Smith, ed., Little, Brown and Company, Boston (1854).
