= Turselia gens =

Ancient Roman family

The gens Turselia, occasionally written Tursellia, was an obscure plebeian family at ancient Rome. Hardly any members of this gens are mentioned by Roman writers, but several are known from inscriptions.

== Origin ==
The nomen Turselius belongs to a large class of gentilicia formed primarily from cognomina ending in the diminutive suffixes -illus or -ellus. The family was probably of Samnite origin, since nearly all of the Turselii known from epigraphy came from Samnium, where they are particularly concentrated at Beneventum and Ligures Baebiani.

== Members ==
This list includes abbreviated praenomina. For an explanation of this practice, see filiation.

- Lucius Turselius, made a will naming Marcus Antonius as his heir, although he had a brother then living. In his second oration against Antony, Cicero noted that he had acquired the property of a great many persons, disinheriting their natural heirs, although he had neither acquaintance nor connection with them.
- Lucius Turselius Stactus, buried in a first- or second-century tomb at Rome.
- Turselius Pudens, the owner of an estate near Ligures Baebiani in Samnium, valued in AD 101 at fifty thousand sestertii, from which interest of three thousand sestertii went to a fund established by Trajan for the support of poor children of the district.

=== Undated Turselii ===
- Turselia, named in an inscription from Ligures Baebiani, along with Lucius Turselius Ant[...] and Lucius Turselius Saturninus.
- Tursellia L. l., a freedwoman, dedicated a tomb at Rome for her collibertus, (Note: A former slave who had been emancipated on the same occasion.) Lucius Tursellius.
- Lucius Tursellius (L. l.), a freedman buried at Rome in a tomb built by his colliberta, Tursellia.
- Lucius Turselius L. f. L. n., the son of Lucius Turselius Fulvius and Voconia Procula of Ligures Baebiani, and the father of Lucius Turselius Rufinus.
- Lucius Turselius Ant[...], named in an inscription from Ligures Baebiani, along with Turselia and Lucius Turselius Saturninus.
- Lucius Turselius L. f. Fulvius, had been pontifex, aedile, quaestor, and twice quattuorvir jure dicundo at Ligures Baebiani. He and his wife, the freedwoman Voconia Procula, were buried at Ligures Baebiani by their grandson, Lucius Turselius Rufinus.
- Turselius Gamala, buried at Ligures Baebiani in a tomb built by the freedwoman Turselia Regilla.
- Turselius Maximus, dedicated a tomb at Beneventum in Samnium for his wife, Aurelia Hammonia.
- Lucius Turselius Maximus, named in an inscription from Fusolae in Samnium, in which Lucius Turselius Restutus makes an offering to the gods for his safe return.
- Turselia Ɔ. l. Myrene, a freedwoman buried at Beneventum.
- Turselia Prima, along with Alexa and Epafra, one of the recipients of two pots donated by Nicia Medus at Rome.
- Turselia Prima, buried at Ligures Baebiani, in a tomb built by Lucius Petronius Geminianus, her husband of twenty-eight years, twenty-two days.
- Lucius Turselius Priscus, dedicated a tomb at Aequum Tuticum in Samnium for Marcia Saturnina, his wife of twenty-five years.
- Lucius Tursellius Priscus, a youth buried at Beneventum, aged thirteen years, eleven months, in a tomb built by his mother, Claudia Maxima.
- Turselia Ɔ. l. Regilla, built a tomb at Ligures Baebiani for herself, Lucius Tullius, Storges, and Turselius Gamala.
- Lucius Turselius Restutus, made an offering to the gods at Fusolae, with the aid of Lucius Silvanus Casanicus, for the safe return of Lucius Turselius Maximus.
- Lucius Turselius L. f. L. n. Rufinus, built a tomb at Ligures Baebiani for his grandparents, Lucius Turselius Fulvius and Voconia Procula.
- Lucius Turselius Saturninus, probably either the son or freedman of Optatus, (Note: There is a blank following the name of Optatus, which probably contained either "f." for filius or "l." for libertus. In either case, the person referred to was probably named "Lucius Turselius Optatus".) named in an inscription from Ligures Baebiani, along with Turselia and Lucius Turselius Ant[...].

== See also ==
- List of Roman gentes

== Bibliography ==
- Marcus Tullius Cicero, Philippicae.
- Dictionary of Greek and Roman Biography and Mythology, William Smith, ed., Little, Brown and Company, Boston (1849).
- Theodor Mommsen et alii, Corpus Inscriptionum Latinarum (The Body of Latin Inscriptions, abbreviated CIL), Berlin-Brandenburgische Akademie der Wissenschaften (1853–present).
