= Maruleia gens =

Ancient Roman family

The gens Maruleia was an obscure plebeian family of ancient Rome. No members of this gens are mentioned by Roman writers, but several are known from inscriptions.

== Members ==
This list includes abbreviated praenomina. For an explanation of this practice, see filiation.

- Gaius Maruleius, named in a Flavian-era inscription from Forum Novum in Sabinum, along with Titus Flavius Primigenius, a freedman of the emperor.
- Maruleius Artemidorus, built a third-century tomb at Rome for his the patron, the freedman Maruleius Elpidephorus.
- Maruleius Elpidephorus, a freedman buried in a third-century tomb at Rome, built by his client, Maruleius Artemidorus.
- Gaius Maruleius C. l. Eros, a freedman, named along with the freedwoman Cossutia Chrysis in an inscription from Rome, dating from the first half of the first century.
- Maruleius Fortunatus, a youth buried at Italica in Hispania Baetica, aged about eleven.
- Maruleia C. f. Po[...], dedicated a tomb at Aquinum in Latium for her daughter, Gennia.
- Gaius Maruleius C. C. l. Sabinus, a freedman buried at Rome, in a sepulchre shared with the freedmen Marcus Caudellius Hera, Marcus Caudellius Phileros, Caudellia Hilara, and Marcus Caudellius Nicasio, dating between the last quarter of the first century BC and the first half of the first century AD.
- Gaius Maruleius Suavus, buried in a first-century tomb at Rome, built by his wife, Grattia Cypare, for herself, Suavus, and her verna, or home-born slave, Agathocles, aged three years, nine months.

== See also ==
- List of Roman gentes

== Bibliography ==
- René Cagnat et alii, L'Année épigraphique (The Year in Epigraphy, abbreviated AE), Presses Universitaires de France (1888–present).
- Hispania Epigraphica (Epigraphy of Spain), Madrid (1989–present).
- Theodor Mommsen et alii, Corpus Inscriptionum Latinarum (The Body of Latin Inscriptions, abbreviated CIL), Berlin-Brandenburgische Akademie der Wissenschaften (1853–present).
- Notizie degli Scavi di Antichità (News of Excavations from Antiquity, abbreviated NSA), Accademia dei Lincei (1876–present).
