= Jania gens =

Ancient Roman family

The gens Jania was an obscure plebeian family at ancient Rome. No members of this gens are mentioned in ancient writers, but several are known from inscriptions.

== Members ==
- Lucius Janius, named in an inscription from Pompeii in Campania.
- Janius Firmus, dedicated a tomb at Rome for his wife, and for his daughter, Grapta.
- Jania Januaria, buried at Aquae in Dacia between AD 150 and 270, along with Gaius Janius Januarius and Janius Marcianus.
- Gaius Janius Januarius, buried at Aquae between AD 150 and 270, along with Janius Marcianus and Jania Januaria.
- Servius Janius Juventius, made an offering to Hercules Invictus at Sibrium in Gallia Transpadana, dating to the latter half of the third century.
- Janius Marcianus, buried at Aquae between AD 150 and 270, along with Gaius Janius Marcianus and Jania Januaria.

== See also ==
- List of Roman gentes

== Bibliography ==
- Theodor Mommsen et alii, Corpus Inscriptionum Latinarum (The Body of Latin Inscriptions, abbreviated CIL), Berlin-Brandenburgische Akademie der Wissenschaften (1853–present).
- René Cagnat et alii, L'Année épigraphique (The Year in Epigraphy, abbreviated AE), Presses Universitaires de France (1888–present).
- Inscriptiones Daciae Romanae (Inscriptions from Roman Dacia, abbreviated IDR), Bucharest (1975–present).
