= Saltoria gens =

Ancient Roman family

The gens Saltoria was an obscure plebeian family at ancient Rome. No members of this gens are mentioned in ancient writers, but a few are known from inscriptions, including two from Alba Fucens in Sabinum.

== Origin ==
The nomen Saltorius is derived from the cognomen Saltor, a dancer, one of a large class of surnames derived from an individual's occupation. Although the inscriptions of this gens place a family of this name in Sabinum, the root is certainly Latin. Chase includes Saltorius among those gentilicia that either originated at Rome, or cannot be shown to have come from anywhere else.

== Members ==
This list includes abbreviated praenomina. For an explanation of this practice, see filiation.

- Saltoria T. f., named in a fragmentary inscription from Alba Fucens, along with one Rubrius, the son of Gaius; the remainder of the inscription seems to be part of a sacred song.
- Gaius Saltorius C. f., made an offering to Hercules at Alba Fucens, on behalf of the soldiers of Africanus Caecilianus.

== See also ==
- List of Roman gentes

== Bibliography ==
- Theodor Mommsen et alii, Corpus Inscriptionum Latinarum (The Body of Latin Inscriptions, abbreviated CIL), Berlin-Brandenburgische Akademie der Wissenschaften (1853–present).
- René Cagnat et alii, L'Année épigraphique (The Year in Epigraphy, abbreviated AE), Presses Universitaires de France (1888–present).
- George Davis Chase, "The Origin of Roman Praenomina", in Harvard Studies in Classical Philology, vol. VIII, pp. 103–184 (1897).
