= Ticinia gens =

Ancient Roman family

The gens Ticinia was an obscure plebeian family at ancient Rome. Almost no members of this gens are mentioned in history, but a few are known from inscriptions.

== Origin ==
The nomen Ticinius belongs to a class of gentilicia formed using the suffix -inius, usually derived from cognomina ending in -inus. Here the root seems to be Ticinus, presumably referring to an inhabitant of Ticinum in Gallia Narbonensis.

== Members ==
This list includes abbreviated praenomina. For an explanation of this practice, see filiation.

- Publius Ticinius Mela, brought the first barber to Rome from Sicily circa 300 BC.
- Ticinius, dedicated a family sepulchre at Savaria in Pannonia Superior, dating from the latter half of the second century, for his wife, Ticinia [...]nia.
- Ticinia [...]nia, buried at Savaria in a family sepulchre built by her husband, Ticinius, dating from the latter half of the second century.

=== Undated Ticinii ===
- Marcus Ticinius, described in an inscription from Turris Libisonis in Sardinia as procurator, or governor of the province, in an unknown year. However, the inscription is thought to be a forgery.
- Ticinius Victor, buried at the site of modern Esnakit, formerly part of Africa Proconsularis, aged seventy.

== See also ==
- List of Roman gentes

== Bibliography ==
- Marcus Terentius Varro, Rerum Rusticarum (Rural Matters).
- Gaius Plinius Secundus (Pliny the Elder), Historia Naturalis (Natural History).
- Theodor Mommsen et alii, Corpus Inscriptionum Latinarum (The Body of Latin Inscriptions, abbreviated CIL), Berlin-Brandenburgische Akademie der Wissenschaften (1853–present).
- George Davis Chase, "The Origin of Roman Praenomina", in Harvard Studies in Classical Philology, vol. VIII, pp. 103–184 (1897).
- Bulletin Archéologique du Comité des Travaux Historiques et Scientifiques (Archaeological Bulletin of the Committee on Historic and Scientific Works, abbreviated BCTH), Imprimerie Nationale, Paris (1885–1973).
