= Lentidia gens =

The gens Lentidia was a minor family at ancient Rome. None of its members is known to have held public office.

== Members ==
- Gaius Lentidius Augustalis, found on a sepulchral tablet in a house at Pisaurum.
- Lucius Lentidius Saturninus, a veteran of either Legio VII or XI, whose name was found at Brekovica in Dalmatia.
- Lentidius, a partisan of Publius Clodius Pulcher, who helped lead a mob of slaves and gladiators against Clodius' supporters in 57 BC. They attacked Publius Sestius, the tribune of the plebs, and left him for dead in the Temple of Castor and Pollux in the forum.

== See also ==
- List of Roman gentes

== Bibliography ==
- Marcus Tullius Cicero, De Domo Sua, Pro Sestio.
- Dictionary of Greek and Roman Biography and Mythology, William Smith, ed., Little, Brown and Company, Boston (1849).
- Theodor Mommsen et alii, Corpus Inscriptionum Latinarum (The Body of Latin Inscriptions, abbreviated "CIL"), Berlin-Brandenburgische Akademie der Wissenschaften (1853–present).
