= Luciena gens =

Ancient Roman family

The gens Luciena was a minor plebeian family of ancient Rome. Members of this gens are first mentioned in the final century of the Republic.

== Origin ==
The nomen Lucienus appears to belong to a class of names derived from other names, including those of other gentilicia. It might therefore be derived from the praenomen Lucius, or the corresponding nomen. Nomina ending in -enus were characteristic of Umbrian.

== Members ==
This list includes abbreviated praenomina. For an explanation of this practice, see filiation.

- Lucienus, a senator, was a friend of Marcus Terentius Varro, and one of the speakers in Varro's dialogue, Rerum Rusticarum. He is apparently the same person mentioned by Cicero in a letter to Atticus.
- Lucius Lucienus, the father of Lucius Lucienus Rufus.
- Lucius Lucienus L. f. Rufus, a young man buried at Rome.
- Lucius Lucienus Ɔ. l. Diocles, a freedman of the Lucieni, mentioned in the same inscription as Lucius Lucienus Rufus.
- Luciena L. l. Philema, a freedwoman of the Lucieni, mentioned in the same inscription as Lucius Lucienus Rufus.
- Quintus Lucienus Ɔ. l. Dicaeus, a freedman of the Lucieni, mentioned in an inscription at Rome.

== See also ==
- List of Roman gentes

== Bibliography ==
- Marcus Terentius Varro, Rerum Rusticarum (Rural Matters).
- Marcus Tullius Cicero, Epistulae ad Atticum.
- Dictionary of Greek and Roman Biography and Mythology, William Smith, ed., Little, Brown and Company, Boston (1849).
- Theodor Mommsen et alii, Corpus Inscriptionum Latinarum (The Body of Latin Inscriptions, abbreviated "CIL"), Berlin-Brandenburgische Akademie der Wissenschaften (1853–present).
- Harper's Dictionary of Classical Literature and Antiquities, Harry Thurston Peck, ed. (Second Edition, 1897).
