= Faucia gens =

Roman gens

The gens Faucia was a Roman family at Arpinum. It is known chiefly from a single individual, Marcus Faucius, an eques and a native of Arpinum, who was one of three commissioners sent in 46 BC to recover the dues of his municipium from its estates in Cisalpine Gaul. The rents from this land were the only fund for the repair of their temples and the cost of their sacrifices and festivals, and had perhaps been withheld due to the Civil War. Cicero recommended the commissioners to Marcus Junius Brutus, then praetor of Cisalpine Gaul. This otherwise unremarkable event is noteworthy because of the light it sheds on the local governments of Italy.

== See also ==
- List of Roman gentes
