= Egilia gens =

The gens Egilia was a plebeian family at Rome. It is known chiefly from a single individual, Lucius Egilius, one of three commissioners who superintended the foundation of the colony planted at Luca, in 177 BC.

== See also ==
- List of Roman gentes
