= Pomentina gens =

Ancient Roman family

The gens Pomentina was an obscure plebeian family of ancient Rome. No members of this gens are mentioned by Roman writers, but several are known from inscriptions.

== Members ==
This list includes abbreviated praenomina. For an explanation of this practice, see filiation.

- Publius Pomentinus, together with Quintus Pomentinus, the former masters of the freedwoman Cornelia Charis, according to an inscription appearing to date from the first half of the first century, although thought to be modern.
- Quintus Pomentinus, together with Publius Pomentinus, the former masters of the freedwoman Cornelia Charis, according to an inscription appearing to date from the first half of the first century, although thought to be modern.
- Pomentina Maxima, built a first century tomb at the site of modern Kavaja, formerly part of Macedonia, for her husband, Publius Maecilius Celer, aged sixty, and Publius Maecilius Vitulus, perhaps her son.
- Gaius Pomentinus Priscus, a youth buried at Rome, aged fifteen, in a tomb dating from the first half of the first century.
- Lucius Pomentinus, named in a first- or second-century inscription from Blera in Etruria.
- Marcus Pomentinus M. f. Turbo, buried along with his son, Marcus Pomentinus, at Epidaurum in Dalmatia, in a tomb dating from the latter half of the first century, or the first half of the second, built by his daughter, Pomentina Tertulla. Turbo had been one of the municipal duumvirs.
- Marcus Pomentinus M. f. M. n., the son of Marcus Pomentinus Turbo and Boria, was buried together with his father at Epidaurum, in a tomb dating from the latter half of the first century, or the first half of the second, built by his sister, Pomentina Tertulla.
- Pomentina M. f. M. n. Tertulla, built a tomb at Epidaurum, dating from the latter half of the first century, or the first half of the second, for her father, Marcus Pomentinus Turbo, and her brother, Marcus Pomentinus.
- Pomentinus Fuscus, buried at Dyrrachium in Macedonia, in a tomb dedicated by his wife, Flabiana, dating from the latter half of the second century, or the first half of the third.

=== Undated Pomentini ===
- Gaius Pomentinus Felix, named in an inscription from Ostia in Latium, along with the freedwoman Julia Apollonia, and Lucius Bucius Antiochus.
- Marcus Pomentinus Major, a centurion in the Legio III Augusta, dedicated a tomb at the site of modern Bir Umm Ali, formerly part of Numidia, for his wife, whose name has not been preserved.
- Gaius Pomentinus Postimius, named in an inscription from Rome, along with Gaius Pomentinus Saturninus and Gaius Pomentinus Proculus.
- Gaius Pomentinus Proculus, named in an inscription from Rome, along with Gaius Pomentinus Saturninus and Gaius Pomentinus Postimius.
- Gaius Pomentinus Saturninus, named in an inscription from Rome, along with Gaius Pomentinus Postimius and Gaius Pomentinus Proculus.

== See also ==
- List of Roman gentes

== Bibliography ==
- Skënder Anamali, Hasan Ceka, and Élizabeth Deniaux, Corpus des Inscriptions Latines d'Albanie (The Body of Latin Inscriptions from Albania), École Française de Rome (2009).
- René Cagnat et alii, L'Année épigraphique (The Year in Epigraphy, abbreviated AE), Presses Universitaires de France (1888–present).
- Stéphane Gsell, Inscriptions Latines de L'Algérie (Latin Inscriptions from Algeria), Edouard Champion, Paris (1922–present).
- Theodor Mommsen et alii, Corpus Inscriptionum Latinarum (The Body of Latin Inscriptions, abbreviated CIL), Berlin-Brandenburgische Akademie der Wissenschaften (1853–present).
- Zeitschrift für Papyrologie und Epigraphik (Journal of Papyrology and Epigraphy), Rudolf Habelt, Bonn (1967–present).
