= Cossinia gens =

Plebeian family at Rome

The gens Cossinia was a plebeian family at Rome. The gens originated at Tibur, and came to Rome early in the first century BC. None of its members ever obtained the higher offices of the state.

== Members ==
This list includes abbreviated praenomina. For an explanation of this practice, see filiation.

- Lucius Cossinius, of Tibur, received the Roman franchise in consequence of the condemnation of Titus Caelius, whom he had accused. He may be the same Cossinius who was a legate of Publius Varinius, and who fell in battle against Spartacus, in 73 BC.
- Lucius Cossinius L. f., an eques, and friend of Cicero, Atticus, and Varro. Cicero mentions his death in 45 BC, and expresses his grief at his loss.
- Lucius Cossinius Anchialus, a freedman of Cicero's friend, was recommended by Cicero to Servius Sulpicius Rufus in 46 BC.
- Cossinius, an eques and friend of Nero's, was mistakenly poisoned by an Egyptian physician, whom the emperor had sent in order to cure his friend.

== See also ==
- List of Roman gentes
