= Usia gens =

Ancient Roman family

The gens Usia was an obscure plebeian family of ancient Rome. No members of this gens are mentioned by Roman writers, but several are known from inscriptions.

== Members ==
This list includes abbreviated praenomina. For an explanation of this practice, see filiation.

- Lucius Usius Lascivos, one of several persons named in an inscription from Tergeste in Venetia and Histria, dating from the first half of the first century.
- Lucius Usius L. l. Evangelus, a freedman buried at Tergeste, in a family sepulchre dating from the first half of the second century, built by Lucius Usius Philippus for himself and several other persons, including Evangelus and other Usii.
- Lucius Usius L. f. Fidus, buried at Tergeste, in a tomb dating from the first half of the second century, built by his father, Lucius Usius Philippus, for himself, Fidus, and several other persons, including other Usii.
- Lucius Usius L. l. Philippus, a freedman who built a family sepulchre at Tergeste, dating from the first half of the second century, for himself and his son, Lucius Usius Fidus, as well as Lucius Usius Thasus, Lucius Usius Venustus, the freedwomen Tullia Cypare and Attia Cogitata, the freeman Lucius Usius Evangelus, and Cossutia Tyche.
- Lucius Usius Thasus, a child buried at Tergeste, aged five, in a tomb dating from the first half of the second century, built by Lucius Usius Philippus for himself, his son, Fidus, and several other persons including Thasus and other Usii.
- Lucius Usius Venustus, buried at Tergeste, in a tomb dating from the first half of the second century, built by Lucius Usius Philippus for himself and several other persons, including Venustus and other Usii.

=== Undated Usii ===
- Gaius Usius L. f. Maximus, named in an inscription from Fundi in Latium.
- Titus Usius Threptus, dedicated a tomb at Rome for his close friend, Gaius Licinius Heraclida.

== See also ==
- List of Roman gentes

== Bibliography ==
- Inscriptiones Italiae (Inscriptions from Italy), Rome (1931-present).
- Theodor Mommsen et alii, Corpus Inscriptionum Latinarum (The Body of Latin Inscriptions, abbreviated CIL), Berlin-Brandenburgische Akademie der Wissenschaften (1853–present).
