= Bucculeia gens =

The gens Bucculeia was a Roman family during the late Republic. It is known chiefly from a single individual, Marcus Bucculeius, a legal scholar, mentioned in a humorous anecdote of Cicero, and attributed by him to the orator Lucius Licinius Crassus.

== See also ==
- List of Roman gentes
