= Simplicinia gens =

Ancient Roman family

The gens Simplicinia was an obscure plebeian family at ancient Rome. No members of this gens are mentioned by ancient writers, but a few are known from inscriptions.

== Origin ==
The nomen Simplicinius belongs to a class of gentilicia derived from other nomina using the suffix -inius, which could also be used to form gentile names from cognomina ending in -inus. Simplicinius is an elaboration on another nomen, Simplicius, which in turn is derived from a surname Simplex, originally applied to someone whose character or habits were described as "simple" or "straightforward". Many cognomina were derived, like Simplex, from the nature of the individuals to whom they were originally applied.

== Members ==
- Marcus Simplicinius Genialis, an eques of high status, and an assistant to the imperial governor of Raetia, named in a dedicatory inscription from Augusta Vindelicorum, dating between AD 260 and 262.
- Simplicinius Serenus, a cavalry soldier from Noviomagus Batavorum, buried at Rome during the second or third century, aged twenty-three, having served for five years.
- Marcus Simplicinius Superinus, a cornicen in the century of Crescens, in the tenth cohort of the Praetorian Guard, was buried at Rome during the first half of the third century, aged thirty-one, with a monument dedicated by his heirs, Gaius Valerius Valens and Marcus Drusinius Lupulus, soldiers in the century of Maximus, in the sixth cohort.
- Simplicinius Victor, a centurion in the Legio I Minervia and Legio III Parthica, was buried at Bonna in Germania Inferior, in a tomb dedicated by his wife, Aelia Arvania.

== See also ==
- List of Roman gentes

== Bibliography ==
- Theodor Mommsen et alii, Corpus Inscriptionum Latinarum (The Body of Latin Inscriptions, abbreviated CIL), Berlin-Brandenburgische Akademie der Wissenschaften (1853–present).
- George Davis Chase, "The Origin of Roman Praenomina", in Harvard Studies in Classical Philology, vol. VIII, pp. 103–184 (1897).
