= Corfidia gens =

Ancient Roman family

The gens Corfidia was an obscure plebeian family of ancient Rome. The only member of this gens mentioned by Roman writers is Lucius Corfidius, an eques known to Cicero. Other Corfidii are known from epigraphy.

== Members ==
This list includes abbreviated praenomina. For an explanation of this practice, see filiation.

- Lucius Corfidius, an eques whom Cicero listed among those who urged Caesar to lift the banishment of Quintus Ligarius in 46 BC. Though his argument was effective—Caesar was visibly overcome by compassion, and granted the request—Cicero was afterward reminded that Corfidius had died at some time prior to his pleading. Varro was probably thinking of this incident in an anecdote related by Pliny the Elder concerning a Corfidius who returned to life.
- P. Corfidius P. l. Dionysus, a freedman buried at Rome, in a tomb built by Philodespotus, dating from the first half of the first century.
- Corfidia P. l. Prima, a freedwoman named in a first-century funerary inscription from Forum Novum in Sabinum, along with the freedman Publius Corfidius Primus, and her own freedman, Anicetus, a boy aged nine.
- Publius Corfidius P. l. Primus, a freedman named in a first-century inscription from Forum Novum, along with the freedwoman Corfidia Prima, and her freedman, Anicetus.
- Publius Corfidius Signinus, buried at Rome, in a tomb dating between the latter half of the first century, and the first half of the second, built by his dear friend, Quintus Sallustius Hermes, who dedicated a verse and ten pots in memory of Signinus.
- Corfidia Tertia, an elderly woman buried at Ammaedara in Africa proconsularis, aged one hundred and ten, in a second- or third-century tomb dedicated by her sons, Felicius and Fortunatus.
- Corfidius Crementius, a fourth-century flamen at Thamugadi in Numidia, where his kinsmen erected a monument in his honour. In another inscription, he is listed among the municipal officials and dignitaries of Thamugadi.

=== Undated Corfidii ===
- Publius Corfidius P. l. Demetrius, a freedman, buried in a family sepulchre at Rome, built by the freedman Publius Corfidius Dorus for his family and fellow freedmen.
- Publius Corfidius P. l. Dorus, a freedman, built a family sepulchre at Rome for himself, his wife, the freedwoman Corfidia Quarta, their children, Primus and Prima, and the freedmen Publius Corfidius Demetrius and Publius Corfidius Mystes.
- Publius Corfidius P. l. Mystes, a freedman, buried in a family sepulchre at Rome, built by the freedman Publius Corfidius Dorus for his family and fellow freedmen.
- (Corfidia P. f.) Prima, daughter of the freedman Publius Corfidius Dorus and Corfidia Quarta, buried in a family sepulchre at Rome, built by her father for himself, his wife, their children, Primus and Prima, and his fellow freedmen.
- (Publius Corfidius P. f.) Primus, son of the freedman Publius Corfidius Dorus and Corfidia Quarta, buried in a family sepulchre at Rome, built by his father for himself, his wife, their children, Primus and Prima, and his fellow freedmen.
- Corfidia P. l. Quarta, a freedwoman, and wife of the freedman Publius Corfidius Dorus, who built a family sepulchre at Rome for himself, his wife, their children, Primus and Prima, and fellow freedmen Publius Corfidius Demetrius and Publius Corfidius Mystes.
- Corfidius Valentinianus, a flamen commemorated among the municipal officials and dignitaries of Thamugadi. The fourth-century flamen Corfidius Crementius is listed toward the end of the inscription.

== See also ==
- List of Roman gentes

== Bibliography ==
=== Ancient sources ===
- Marcus Tullius Cicero, Epistulae ad Atticum; Pro Ligario.
- Gaius Plinius Secundus (Pliny the Elder), Historia Naturalis (Natural History).

=== Modern sources ===
- Bulletin Archéologique du Comité des Travaux Historiques et Scientifiques (Archaeological Bulletin of the Committee on Historic and Scientific Works, abbreviated BCTH), Imprimerie Nationale, Paris (1885–1973).
- René Cagnat et alii, L'Année épigraphique (The Year in Epigraphy, abbreviated AE), Presses Universitaires de France (1888–present).
- Dictionary of Greek and Roman Biography and Mythology, William Smith, ed., Little, Brown and Company, Boston (1849).
- Theodor Mommsen et alii, Corpus Inscriptionum Latinarum (The Body of Latin Inscriptions, abbreviated CIL), Berlin-Brandenburgische Akademie der Wissenschaften (1853–present).
