= Lafrenia gens =

Romanian family house

The gens Lafrenia was a minor family in Roman history. It is known from only a few individuals, only one of whom was a figure of any consequence.

== Members ==
This list includes abbreviated praenomina. For an explanation of this practice, see filiation.

- Titus Lafrenius, one of the leaders of the Italic confederates during the Social War. He and his allies defeated the Roman legate Gnaeus Pompeius Strabo, but he was himself defeated and killed soon afterward. In many sources his name is given as Titus Afranius or Afrenius.
- Publius Lafrenius, the father of Gaius.
- Gaius Lafrenius P. f., found in an inscription from the neighborhood of Tibur; he was a member of the tribus Ufentina.

== See also ==
- List of Roman gentes

== Bibliography ==
- Lucius Annaeus Florus, Epitome de T. Livio Bellorum Omnium Annorum DCC (Epitome of Livy: All the Wars of Seven Hundred Years).
- Appianus Alexandrinus (Appian), Bellum Civile (The Civil War).
- Dictionary of Greek and Roman Biography and Mythology, William Smith, ed., Little, Brown and Company, Boston (1849).
- Theodor Mommsen et alii, Corpus Inscriptionum Latinarum (The Body of Latin Inscriptions, abbreviated "CIL"), Berlin-Brandenburgische Akademie der Wissenschaften (1853–present).
- T. Robert S. Broughton, The Magistrates of the Roman Republic, American Philological Association (1952).
