= Tanicia gens =

Ancient Roman family

The gens Tanicia was an obscure plebeian family at ancient Rome. No members of this gens are mentioned by ancient writers, but a few are known from inscriptions.

== Origin ==
The nomen Tanicius seems to belong to a class of gentilicia formed from cognomina ending in -ex or -icus, but no corresponding surname is known.

== Branches and cognomina ==
The only regular surname associated with the Tanicii is Verus, meaning "true" or "just". It belongs to a class of surnames originally derived from the character or habits of an individual. Zosimus, borne by one of the Tanicii, is a Greek name, and would have been a personal surname, possibly the birth name of a freedman of one of the Tanicii, retained by him as a cognomen after his manumission.

== Members ==
This list includes abbreviated praenomina. For an explanation of this practice, see filiation.

- Lucius Tanicius L. f. Verus, a native of Vienna in Gallia Narbonensis, was a centurion in the Legio III Cyrenaica, stationed in Egypt in AD 80 or 81.
- Lucius Tanicius Verus, prefect of a Roman fort along the Antonine Wall in northern Britain, at the site of modern Cadder, in the middle or later part of the second century. An inscription records his offering to Silvanus.
- Lucius Tanicius Zosimus, made a cult offering to the Hero of Ithiostla in Moesia Inferior, dating to the first half of the second century.

== See also ==
- List of Roman gentes

== Bibliography ==
- Theodor Mommsen et alii, Corpus Inscriptionum Latinarum (The Body of Latin Inscriptions, abbreviated CIL), Berlin-Brandenburgische Akademie der Wissenschaften (1853–present).
- René Cagnat et alii, L'Année épigraphique (The Year in Epigraphy, abbreviated AE), Presses Universitaires de France (1888–present).
- George Davis Chase, "The Origin of Roman Praenomina", in Harvard Studies in Classical Philology, vol. VIII, pp. 103–184 (1897).
- John C. Traupman, The New College Latin & English Dictionary, Bantam Books, New York (1995).
