= Equitia gens =

Ancient Roman family

The gens Equitia was an obscure plebeian family at ancient Rome, known from only a few individuals. No member of this gens obtained the consulship prior to the third century, but the emperor Probus may have been descended from the Tarquitii.

== Members ==
- Lucius Equitius, said to have been a runaway slave who gave himself out as a son of Tiberius Gracchus, and was in consequence elected tribune of the plebs for 99 BC. While tribune designate, he took an active part in the designs of Lucius Appuleius Saturninus, and was killed with him in 100 BC.
- Lucius Equitius C. f. Caecilianus Postimus, named in a sepulchral inscription at Caere, dating probably from the late Republic. It has been suggested that his filiation refers to his biological rather than adoptive father, if an adoption, as implied by the name, took place.
- Equitius, consul in AD 374.

== See also ==
- List of Roman gentes
