= Critonia gens =

The gens Critonia was a plebeian family at Rome. It is known chiefly from a single individual, Lucius Critonius, who was one of the first aediles cerealis after the institution of that office by Caesar in 44 BC. Critonius had belonged to Caesar's party, but objected to having to pay in order to honour his memory during the Cerealia following Caesar's murder.

== See also ==
- List of Roman gentes
