= Mutia gens =

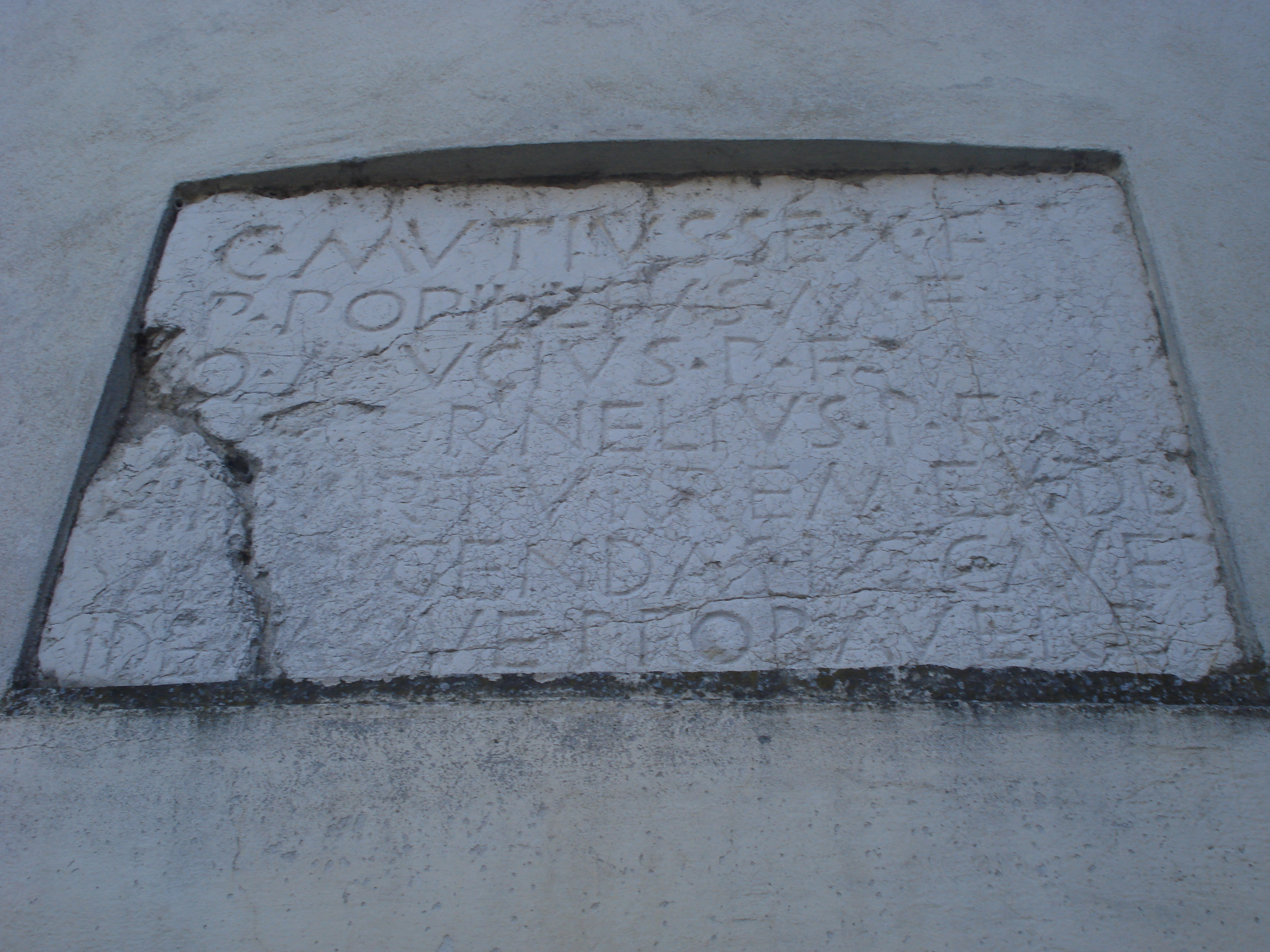
The Lapide dei Quattuorviri, now in the wall of a church at Gottolengo, near the ancient city of Brixia. The stone dates to the first century, and commemorates the construction of a defensive tower by the quattuorviri of Brixia, Gaius Mutius, Publius Popillius, Quintus Mucius, and Marcus Cornelius.

The gens Mutia was an obscure plebeian family at Rome. None of its members is known to have held any magistracy, but many are known from inscriptions, including a large number of freedmen.

== Members ==
This list includes abbreviated praenomina. For an explanation of this practice, see filiation.

- Gaius Mutius Sex. f., one of the quattuorviri (Note: A board of four municipal officials.) at Brixia, who erected a defensive tower on the site of the present village of Gottolengo, dated to the first century.
- Gaius Mutius Eutychus, named in a large inscription from Rome, from the time of the emperor Vespasian.
- Lucius Mutius Fortunatus, named in an inscription from Rome, recording a gift to Diana, dated to AD 86.
- Lucius Mutius Trophimus, named in an inscription from Rome, recording a gift to Diana, dated to AD 86.
- Lucius Mutius L. l. Pamphilus, a freedman, named in an inscription from Rome.
- Lucius Mutius L. f. Faustus, buried at Rome, aged eight years.
- Quintus Mutius, the former master of Antiochus, Adrastus, Philargurus, and Mutia Philete.
- Quintus Mutius Q. l. Antiochus, a freedman named in an inscription from Rome.
- Mutia Q. l. Philete, a freedwoman named in an inscription from Rome.
- Quintus Mutius Q. l. Adrastus, a freedman named in an inscription from Rome.
- Quintus Mutius Q. l. Philargurus, a freedman named in an inscription from Rome.
- Marcus Mutius, the former master of Marcus Mutius Salvius.
- Marcus Mutius M. l. Salvius, a freedman buried at Rome.
- Lucius Mutius, the former master of Bithus and Mutia Hilara.
- Lucius Mutius L. l. Bithus, a freedman named in an inscription from Rome.
- Mutia L. l. Hilara, a freedwoman named in an inscription from Rome.
- Titus Mutius, the former master of Moschus, Carito, and Mutia Philematia.
- Titus Mutius T. l. Moschus, a freedman buried at Rome.
- Mutia T. l. Philematia, a freedwoman buried at Rome.
- Titus Mutius T. l. Carito, a freedman buried at Rome.
- Lucius Mutius L. f. Faustinus, buried at Bulla Regia in Africa Proconsularis, aged seventy-four.
- Gaius Mutius Sabinianus, erected a monument to his late wife, Neria Aetia, at Beneventum.
- Gaius Mutius, named in a libationary inscription dedicated to Hercules, found at Poggi Alti in Etruria.
- Marcus Mutius, named in a libationary inscription dedicated to Hercules, found at Poggi Alti in Etruria.
- Lucius Mutius Gentilis, mentioned in an inscription found at Venterol, formerly part of Gallia Narbonensis.
- Sextus Mutius, the former master of Sextus Mutius Numenius, Mutia Eleutheris, and Mutia Vitalis.
- Sextus Mutius Sex. l. Numenius, a freedman, named in a funerary inscription from Rome.
- Mutia Sex. l. Eleutheris, a freedwoman, named in a funerary inscription from Rome.
- Mutia Sex. l. Vitalis, a freedwoman, named in a funerary inscription from Rome.
- Gaius Mutius C. l., named in an inscription from Samothrace.

== See also ==
- List of Roman gentes

== Bibliography ==
- Theodor Mommsen et alii, Corpus Inscriptionum Latinarum (The Body of Latin Inscriptions, abbreviated CIL), Berlin-Brandenburgische Akademie der Wissenschaften (1853–present).
- René Cagnat et alii, L'Année épigraphique (The Year in Epigraphy, abbreviated AE), Presses Universitaires de France (1888–present).
