= Cotia gens =

The gens Cotia was a plebeian family at Rome. It is known chiefly from a single individual, Quintus Cotius Achilles. On account of his bravery, he served as the legate of Quintus Caecilius Metellus during his campaign against the Celtiberi in Hispania, 143 BC. He distinguished himself by slaying two of the enemy in single combat.

== See also ==
- List of Roman gentes
