= Holconia gens =

Ancient Roman family

The gens Holconia was a Roman plebeian family of imperial times. No members of this gens are mentioned by Roman writers, but a number are known from epigraphy, showing that for generations they were among the leading families of Pompeii in Campania. Nearly all of the inscriptions of the Holconii are from Pompeii, although an inscription from second-century Egypt indicates that some of them escaped the destruction of Pompeii in AD 79.

== Members ==
This list includes abbreviated praenomina. For an explanation of this practice, see filiation.

- Marcus Holconius M. f. Rufus, a military tribune and one of the municipal duumvirs at Pompeii at least five times toward the end of the first century BC, subsequently became a priest of the cult of Augustus.
- Marcus Holconius M. f. Celer, a priest of the cult of Augustus in the early first century, was also one of the municipal duumvirs.
- Marcus Holconius Macro, one of the municipal officials at Pompeii.
- Marcus Holconius Priscus, aedile and duumvir at Pompeii, commemorated in numerous inscriptions from city's final decade.
- Holconia M. f., named in a pottery inscription from Pompeii.
- Gaius Holconius, named in a tile inscription from Pompeii.
- Gaius Holconius Felix, named in a tile inscription from Pompeii.
- Holconius Jucundus, named in tile and wood inscriptions from Pompeii.
- Marcus Holconius Proculus, named in a wood inscription from Pompeii.
- Marcus Holconius Ampissus, named in an inscription from Karanis in Egypt, dating from the middle of the second century.

== See also ==
- List of Roman gentes

== Bibliography ==
- René Cagnat et alii, L'Année épigraphique (The Year in Epigraphy, abbreviated AE), Presses Universitaires de France (1888–present).
- Theodor Mommsen et alii, Corpus Inscriptionum Latinarum (The Body of Latin Inscriptions, abbreviated CIL), Berlin-Brandenburgische Akademie der Wissenschaften (1853–present).
