= Matinia gens =

The gens Matinia was a minor plebeian family at Rome. Its most famous member may have been Publius Matinius, a money-broker in the time of Cicero.

== Members ==
- Publius Matinius, a money-broker, was recommended to Cicero by Marcus Junius Brutus in 51 BC, when Cicero was proconsul in Cilicia. Together with Marcus Scaptius, a client of Brutus, Matinius had loaned a considerable amount to the people of Salamis.
- Titus Matinius T. f. Hymenaeus, (Note: Or T. l. in one reading, a freedman.) named in an inscription found near the abbey of San Pietro at Ferentillo in Umbria.

== See also ==
- List of Roman gentes

== Bibliography ==
- Marcus Tullius Cicero, Epistulae ad Atticum.
- Theodor Mommsen et alii, Corpus Inscriptionum Latinarum (The Body of Latin Inscriptions, abbreviated CIL), Berlin-Brandenburgische Akademie der Wissenschaften (1853–present).
