= Statinia gens =

Ancient Roman family

The gens Statinia was an obscure plebeian family at ancient Rome. No members of this gens are mentioned by ancient writers, but several are known from inscriptions, several of which are from Aquileia in Venetia and Histria.

== Origin ==
The nomen Statinius belongs to a class of gentilicia derived from other names ending in -inus, using the gentile-forming suffix -inius. In this case, the nomen is probably derived from the Oscan praenomen Statius, and is cognate with the nomina Statius and Statilius.

== Members ==
This list includes abbreviated praenomina. For an explanation of this practice, see filiation.

- Publius Statinius, named in a second-century plaster inscription from Curia Raetorum in Raetia.
- Sextus Statinius Aplinis, buried at Rider in Dalmatia, aged eighty, in a tomb dating from the first century, or the first half of the second.
- Marcus Statinius Dorus, made an offering to Luna and Mars on behalf of Fruticia Thymele, who made a reciprocal offering to the Magna Mater and Ceres, recorded in two inscriptions from Aquileia in Venetia and Histria, dating to the last quarter of the first century, or the first quarter of the third.
- Statinia M. l. Phaenusa, a freedwoman buried at Aquileia during the second century, or the latter half of the first.
- Statinia Phoebe, buried at Poetovio in Pannonia Superior, with a monument from her husband, Gaius Caecina Florus, dating from the first half of the second century.
- Statinia Prima, buried in a third-century sepulchre at Rome, aged twenty years, six months, and nineteen days, with a monument from her husband, the freedman Marcus Aurelius Primus.
- Statinia Strategis, buried in a first-century tomb at Aquileia, with a monument from her son, Gaius Plenius Strato, one of the Seviri Augustales.
- Statinia Thymele, dedicated a second-century tomb at Aquileia for her husband, the freedman Lucius Acestius Saturninus, one of the Seviri Augustales.

== See also ==
- List of Roman gentes

== Bibliography ==
- Theodor Mommsen et alii, Corpus Inscriptionum Latinarum (The Body of Latin Inscriptions, abbreviated CIL), Berlin-Brandenburgische Akademie der Wissenschaften (1853–present).
- René Cagnat et alii, L'Année épigraphique (The Year in Epigraphy, abbreviated AE), Presses Universitaires de France (1888–present).
- Viktor Hoffiller and Balduin Saria, Antike Inschriften aus Jugoslawien (Ancient Inscriptions from Yugoslavia, abbreviated AIJ), vol. 1: Noricum und Pannonia Superior, Zagreb (1938).
- Giovanni Battista Brusin, Inscriptiones Aquileiae (Inscriptions of Aquileia), Udine (1991–1993).
