= Rabonia gens =

The gens Rabonia was an obscure plebeian family at ancient Rome. Only a few members of this gens are mentioned in history or known from inscriptions.

== Members ==
This list includes abbreviated praenomina. For an explanation of this practice, see filiation.

- Lucius Rabonius, one of the guardians of the son of Publius Junius, was convinced by the praetor Verres in 80 BC to undertake extensive repairs on the temple of Castor, at many times the actual cost, although Verres diverted most of the money to himself, and no significant amount of work was done.
- Gaius Rabonius P. (f.) Flaccus, named in a funerary inscription from Castrimoenium in Latium.
- Publius Rabonius Justus, the husband of Caecilia Tuticana, a woman buried at Rome.

== See also ==
- List of Roman gentes

== Bibliography ==
- Marcus Tullius Cicero, In Verrem.
- Dictionary of Greek and Roman Biography and Mythology, William Smith, ed., Little, Brown and Company, Boston (1849).
- Theodor Mommsen et alii, Corpus Inscriptionum Latinarum (The Body of Latin Inscriptions, abbreviated CIL), Berlin-Brandenburgische Akademie der Wissenschaften (1853–present).
