= Juncia gens =

Ancient Roman family

The gens Juncia was an obscure Roman family of Augusta Taurinorum in Cisalpine Gaul. No members of this plebeian gens are mentioned in ancient writers, but a few are known from inscriptions, dating from the first century to the third.

== Praenomina ==
Although the Juncii are documented by only a handful of inscriptions, these show that they used the common praenomina Gaius and Quintus, as well as the highly unusual names Rufus and Fronto, of which the latter was largely restricted to Cisalpine Gaul. The inscriptions also provide an instance of the women's praenomen Prima.

== Members ==
This list includes abbreviated praenomina. For an explanation of this practice, see filiation.

- Juncia Rufi f. Pola, buried at Augusta Taurinorum in a tomb dating from the first half of the first century, aged sixteen.
- Prima Juncia, named in an inscription from Augusta Taurinorum, dating from the first half of the first century.
- Fronto Juncius C. f., buried at Augusta Taurinorum in a tomb dating from the first half of the first century, aged eighty.
- Juncius Justus, a soldier in a cohort of the vigiles at Rome.
- Quintus Juncius Januarius, named in a third-century inscription from Augusta Taurinorum.

== See also ==
- List of Roman gentes

== Bibliography ==
- Theodor Mommsen et alii, Corpus Inscriptionum Latinarum (The Body of Latin Inscriptions, abbreviated CIL), Berlin-Brandenburgische Akademie der Wissenschaften (1853–present).
