= Taracia gens =

Ancient Roman family

The gens Taracia was an obscure plebeian family at ancient Rome. No members of this gens appear in history, although at least one held the rank of quaestor at an uncertain period. Several are known from inscriptions.

== Origin ==
The nomen Taracius is probably of Oscan origin, indicating that the Taracii were likely descended from the Sabines, Samnites, or some other people of central and southern Italy.

== Branches and cognomina ==
The only cognomen found in the inscriptions of the Taracii is Felix, a common surname meaning "fortunate" or "happy".

== Members ==
This list includes abbreviated praenomina. For an explanation of this practice, see filiation.

- Gnaeus Taracius Cn. f., a young man buried at Casilinum in Campania, aged twenty, in a tomb dedicated by his mother, and dating to the latter half of the first century BC.
- Marcus Taracius, buried at Carthage in Africa Proconsularis.
- Marcus Taracius M. f., a quaestor, made an offering to Demeter at Cumae in Campania.
- Neus (Note: Presumably Gnaeus, which seems to have been a regular praenomen of this gens.) Taracius Felix, dedicated a tomb at Rome for his foster-son, Felicior, aged four years, eight months, and seven days.

== See also ==
- List of Roman gentes

== Bibliography ==
- Theodor Mommsen et alii, Corpus Inscriptionum Latinarum (The Body of Latin Inscriptions, abbreviated CIL), Berlin-Brandenburgische Akademie der Wissenschaften (1853–present).
- Hermann Dessau, Inscriptiones Latinae Selectae (Select Latin Inscriptions, abbreviated ILS), Berlin (1892–1916).
- George Davis Chase, "The Origin of Roman Praenomina", in Harvard Studies in Classical Philology, vol. VIII, pp. 103–184 (1897).
- Zeïneb Benzina Ben Abdallah and Leïla Ladjimi Sebaï, Catalogue des inscriptions latines païennes inédites du Musée de Carthage (Catalogue of Unpublished Pagan Latin Inscriptions from the Museum of Carthage, abbreviated CILPCart), Rome (2011).
