= Scutaria gens =

Ancient Roman family

The gens Scutaria was an obscure plebeian family at ancient Rome. Few members of this gens are mentioned in history, but others are known from inscriptions.

== Origin ==
The nomen Scutarius belongs to a class of gentilicia derived from occupations; a scutarius was a shield-maker. The family seems to have come from Venusia in Apulia, originally a Samnite town, captured during the Third Samnite War. A Roman colony was established there in 291 BC.

== Praenomina ==
The only praenomina found in the inscriptions of the Scutarii are Lucius and Sextus, both of which were common throughout all periods of Roman history.

== Members ==
This list includes abbreviated praenomina. For an explanation of this practice, see filiation.

- Scutaria, named in a late second- or early third-century inscription from Aleria in Corsica.
- Scutarius, named in an inscription from Anicium in Gallia Aquitania.
- Lucius Scutarius, quaestor at Venusia in Apulia in 32 BC, and one of the duumviri in the following year.
- Sextus Scutarius Aethrius, built a tomb for himself and his family at Rome.
- Lucius Scutarius Andrea, dedicated an early first-century tomb at Venusia to the freedman Marcus Turellius Diomedes.
- Scutaria L. l. Epistolio, a freedwoman buried at Allifae in Campania.
- Sextus Scutarius Successus, named in a funerary inscription from Pisae in Etruria.

== See also ==
- List of Roman gentes

== Bibliography ==
- Theodor Mommsen et alii, Corpus Inscriptionum Latinarum (The Body of Latin Inscriptions, abbreviated CIL), Berlin-Brandenburgische Akademie der Wissenschaften (1853–present).
- Dictionary of Greek and Roman Geography, William Smith, ed., Little, Brown and Company, Boston (1854).
- René Cagnat et alii, L'Année épigraphique (The Year in Epigraphy, abbreviated AE), Presses Universitaires de France (1888–present).
- George Davis Chase, "The Origin of Roman Praenomina", in Harvard Studies in Classical Philology, vol. VIII, pp. 103–184 (1897).
- Paul von Rohden, Elimar Klebs, & Hermann Dessau, Prosopographia Imperii Romani (The Prosopography of the Roman Empire, abbreviated PIR), Berlin (1898).
- Ralph Van Deman Magoffin, The Quinquennales: an Historical Study, Johns Hopkins Press, Baltimore (1913).
- John C. Traupman, The New College Latin & English Dictionary, Bantam Books, New York (1995).
