= Laceria gens =

The gens Laceria was a minor plebeian family at Rome. It is known primarily from Gaius Lacerius, one of the tribunes of the plebs in 401 BC. A few other Lacerii are known from inscriptions.

== Origin ==
The nome Lacerius appears to be derived from the cognomen Lacer, meaning "torn, mangled", suggesting that its original bearer was deformed or withered in some way, either by birth or injury.

== Members ==
- Gaius Lacerius, tribune of the plebs in 401 BC. He and Marcus Acutius were co-opted by three of their colleagues, apparently through of the patricians, and in violation of the lex Trebonia.
- Quintus Lacerius, a name inscribed on a tablet found in a columbarium at Rome, and taken to the library at Forum Cornelii.
- Quintus Lacerius Q. l?, a name inscribed on a tablet found in a columbarium on the banks of the Tiber, and now stored at the Baths of Diocletian.
- Quintus Lacerius, the former master of Quintus Lacerius Dionysius and Laceria Prima.
- Quintus Lacerius Q. l. Dionysius, freedman of Quintus Lacerius. Commemorated on a second century marble funerary tablet found at Rome between the Via Salaria and the Via Pinciana.
- Laceria Q. l. Prima, freedwoman of Quintus Lacerius. Named on the same funerary tablet with Quintus Lacerius Dionysius.

== See also ==
- List of Roman gentes

== Bibliography ==
- Titus Livius (Livy), Ab Urbe Condita (History of Rome).
- Dionysius of Halicarnassus, Romaike Archaiologia.
- Lucius Cassius Dio Cocceianus (Cassius Dio), Roman History.
- Dictionary of Greek and Roman Biography and Mythology, William Smith, ed., Little, Brown and Company, Boston (1849).
- Theodor Mommsen et alii, Corpus Inscriptionum Latinarum (The Body of Latin Inscriptions, abbreviated "CIL"), Berlin-Brandenburgische Akademie der Wissenschaften (1853–present).
- T. Robert S. Broughton, The Magistrates of the Roman Republic, American Philological Association (1952).
- John C. Traupman, The New College Latin & English Dictionary, Bantam Books, New York (1995).
