= Cupiennia gens =

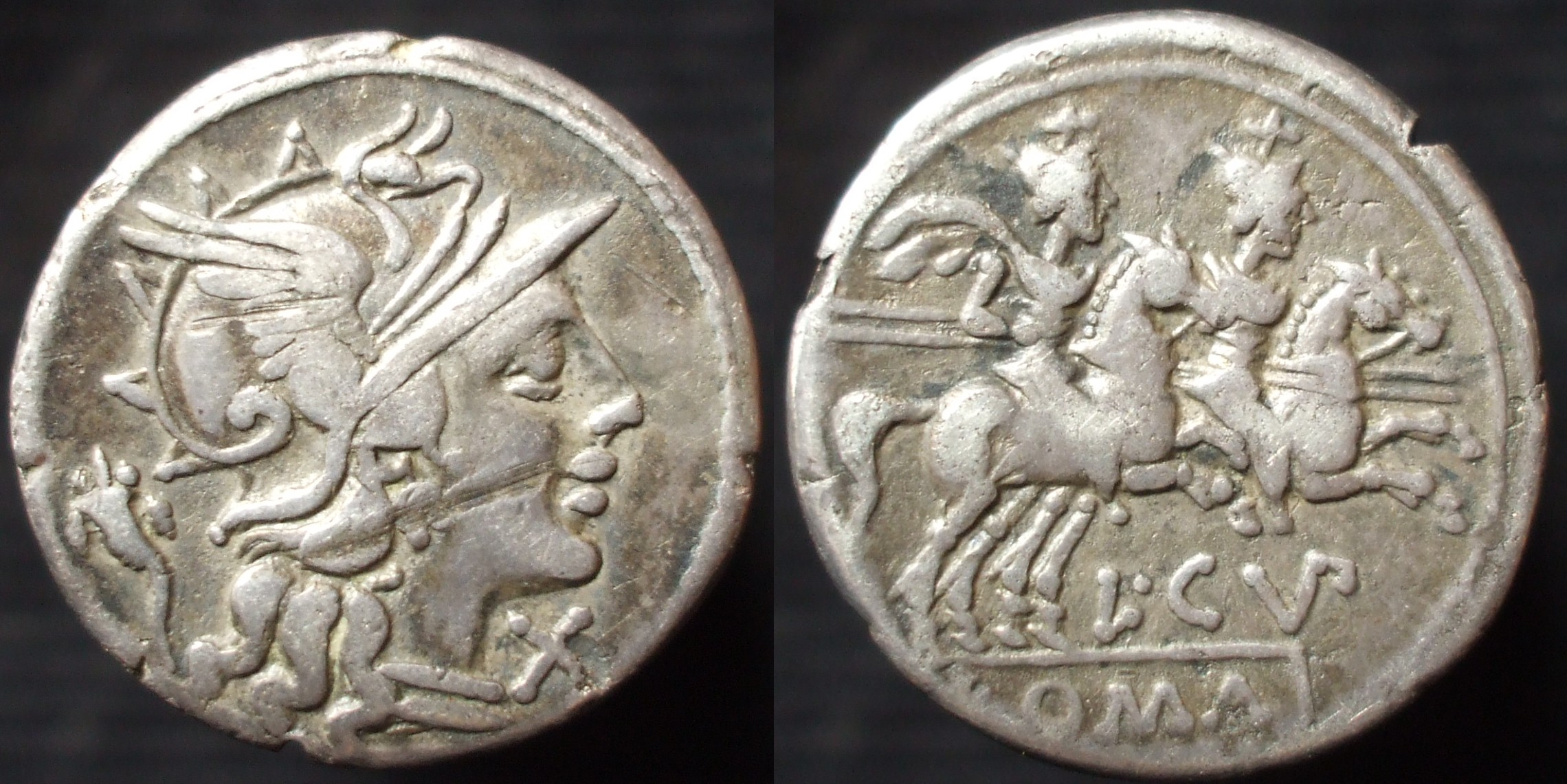
Denarius of Lucius Cupiennius, 147 BC. The cornucopia is behind the head of Roma, on the obverse.

The gens Cupiennia was a plebeian family at Rome. Members of this gens are first mentioned toward the end of the Republic. None of them achieved any great importance.

== Members ==
- Lucius Cupiennius, triumvir monetalis in 147 BC. His coins feature a cornucopia (copia in Latin), a possible allusion to his name.
- Gaius Cupiennius, a friend of Cicero, who wrote him a letter in 44 BC, reminding him of the friendship that had existed between him and Cupiennius' father, and entreating Cupiennius to interest himself in the affairs of the people of Buthrotum.
- Gaius Cupiennius Libo, an inhabitant of Cumae, and a friend of Augustus, said by the scholiast on Horatius to be the same Cupiennius attacked by Horatius on account of his adulterous intercourse with Roman matrons.

== See also ==
- List of Roman gentes

== Bibliography ==
- Marcus Tullius Cicero, Epistulae ad Atticum.
- Quintus Horatius Flaccus, Satirae.
- Dictionary of Greek and Roman Biography and Mythology, William Smith, ed., Little, Brown and Company, Boston (1849).
- Bartolomeo Borghesi, Oeuvres complètes de Bartolomeo Borghesi, Imprimerie Nationale, Paris, 1862.
- Michael Crawford, Roman Republican Coinage, Cambridge University Press (1974, 2001).
