= Gargonia gens =

The gens Gargonia was a minor Roman family during first and second centuries BC. Some of the gens were of equestrian rank, but none appear to have held any curule magistracies.

== Members ==
This list includes abbreviated praenomina. For an explanation of this practice, see filiation.

- Quintus Gargonius, the former master of Aulus Gargonius.
- Aulus Gargonius Q. l., a freedman whose name appears in a list of foremen who built a wall and parapet for Ceres at Capua in 106 BC.
- Gaius Gargonius, triumvir monetalis in 86 BC.
- Gaius Gargonius, an eques of little education, but a clear and intelligent speaker, according to Cicero.
- Gaius Gargonius, ridiculed by Horace in the Satires. Found as "Gorgonius" in some manuscripts.
- Gargonius, a rhetorician mentioned by Seneca the Elder.
- Gnaeus Gargonius Paullinus, buried along the Via Flaminia at Fulginium.

== See also ==
- List of Roman gentes

== Bibliography ==
- Marcus Tullius Cicero, Brutus.
- Quintus Horatius Flaccus (Horace), Satirae (Satires).
- Lucius Annaeus Seneca (Seneca the Elder), Controversiae and Susasoriae.
- Dictionary of Greek and Roman Biography and Mythology, William Smith, ed., Little, Brown and Company, Boston (1849).
- Corpus Inscriptionum Latinarum.
