= Laenia gens =

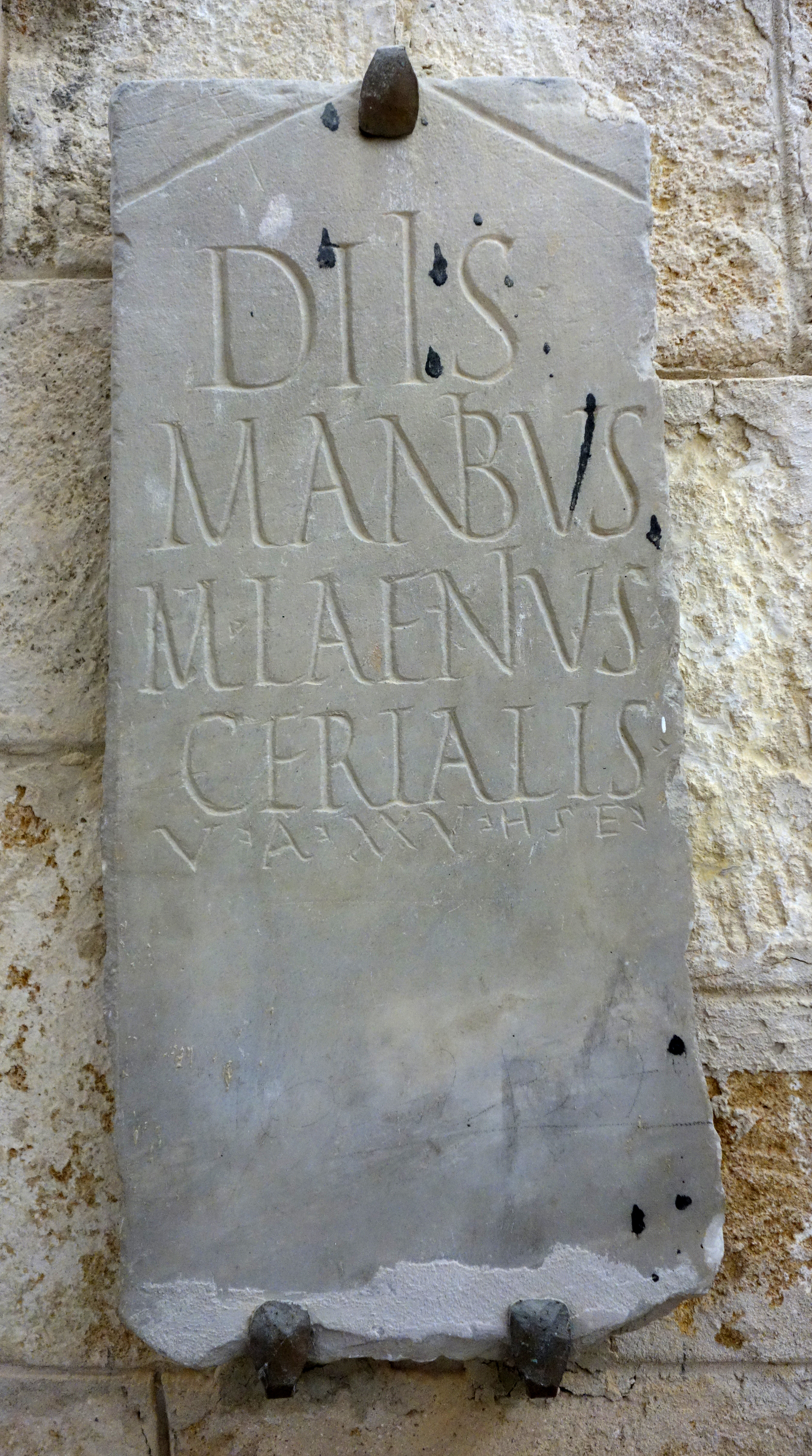
Funerary stele of Marcus Laenius Cerialis, Brundisium, 1st century

The gens Laenia was a minor family at Rome during the first century BC. It is remembered chiefly from two individuals, one a friend of Varro, the other of Cicero. Both had houses at Brundisium, suggesting either that the family came from that region, or that the individuals mentioned were closely related.

== Members ==
- Marcus Laenius Strabo, (Note: Called Laelius Strabo by Pliny.) an eques at Brundisium, and a friend of Varro. He introduced the aviary to Roman culture.
- Marcus Laenius Flaccus, (Note: Also found as Lenius.) a friend of Titus Pomponius Atticus, who allowed the exiled Cicero to remain at his house near Brundisium in 58 BC, in defiance of the measure of Publius Clodius Pulcher forbidding it, until the orator could make his way to Epirus. In 51, Laenius asked Cicero for a sub-prefecture in Cilicia, where he had lent money at interest. Cicero refused to grant public office to a money-lender, but he recommended Laenius to Publius Silius Nerva, propraetor of Bithynia and Pontus, who might be willing to do so.

== See also ==
List of Roman gentes

== Bibliography ==
- Marcus Terentius Varro, Rerum Rusticarum (Rural Matters).
- Marcus Tullius Cicero, De Domo Sua, Pro Plancio, Epistulae ad Familiares, Epistulae ad Atticum.
- Gaius Plinius Secundus (Pliny the Elder), Naturalis Historia (Natural History).
- Dictionary of Greek and Roman Biography and Mythology, William Smith, ed., Little, Brown and Company, Boston (1849).
