= Tarutilia gens =

Ancient Roman family

The gens Tarutilia was an obscure plebeian family at ancient Rome. No members of this gens are mentioned in history, but several are known from inscriptions.

== Origin ==
The nomen Tarutilius belongs to a class of gentilicia that was typically derived from either cognomina ending in the diminutive suffix -ulus, or perhaps the double diminutives -illus or -ellus, or more probably in this case, from existing gentilicia, such as Tarutius, a nomen of Etruscan origin.

== Members ==
This list includes abbreviated praenomina. For an explanation of this practice, see filiation.

- Tarutilius, named in a bone inscription from an uncertain location, dated the nones of October, 77 BC.
- Tarutilius, mentioned in a portion of the Fasti Praenestini immediately following the Larentalia, for which he apparently left a large testamentary donation.
- Aulus Tarutilius, the former master of Aulus Tarutilius Philomusus.
- Aulus Tarutilius A. l. Philomusus, a freedman buried at Rome, some time between the middle of the first century BC, and the first century AD.
- Lucius Tarutilius, the former master of Lucius Tarutilius Saturninus.
- Lucius Tarutilius L. l. Saturninus, a freed child buried at Rome during the first half of the first century, aged two years, four months.

== See also ==
- List of Roman gentes

== Bibliography ==
- Dictionary of Greek and Roman Biography and Mythology, William Smith, ed., Little, Brown and Company, Boston (1849).
- Theodor Mommsen et alii, Corpus Inscriptionum Latinarum (The Body of Latin Inscriptions, abbreviated CIL), Berlin-Brandenburgische Akademie der Wissenschaften (1853–present).
- René Cagnat et alii, L'Année épigraphique (The Year in Epigraphy, abbreviated AE), Presses Universitaires de France (1888–present).
- George Davis Chase, "The Origin of Roman Praenomina", in Harvard Studies in Classical Philology, vol. VIII, pp. 103–184 (1897).
