= Amafinia gens =

Ancient Roman family

The gens Amafinia or Amafania was a Roman family during the late Republic. The best-known member of the gens was Gaius Amafinius, one of the earliest Roman writers in favor of the Epicurean philosophy. Cicero considered his works deficient in arrangement and style.

== See also ==
- List of Roman gentes
