= Aquinia gens =

The gens Aquinia was a plebeian family in Rome. The gens does not appear to have been particularly large or important, and is known primarily from two individuals.

== Members of the gens ==
- Marcus Aquinius, a partisan of Gnaeus Pompeius in Africa, who took part in the war against Caesar. After the defeat of the Pompeians, he was pardoned by Caesar.
- Aquinius, a very inferior poet, a contemporary of Catullus and Cicero.

== See also ==
- List of Roman gentes
