= Tetrinia gens =

Ancient Roman family

The gens Tetrinia was an obscure plebeian family at ancient Rome. Almost no members of this gens are mentioned in history, but several are known from inscriptions.

== Members ==
This list includes abbreviated praenomina. For an explanation of this practice, see filiation.

- Tetrinius, whom Suetonius describes as a brigand, was demanded by the crowd at the arena during the reign of Caligula. The emperor derided those who called for his appearance, describing them all as Tetrinii.
- Tetrinia P. Ɔ. l. Ammia, a freedwoman named in an inscription from Narbo in Gallia Narbonensis, along with Numerius Vibius Rufus.
- Publius Tetrinius P. f. Amphio, named along with the freedman Lucius Cornelius Neo, in an inscription from Thessalonica in Macedonia, dating from the middle or late first century BC.
- Gnaeus Tetrinius Cn. f. Atticus, buried at Rome, along with the freedmen Titus Didius Hector and Titus Didius Boethus, and the freedwoman Didia Chreste.
- Gnaeus Tetrinius Hilarus, together with Sextus Flavius Zmaragdus, built a tomb at Rome for Flavia Primigenia.

== See also ==
- List of Roman gentes

== Bibliography ==
- Gaius Suetonius Tranquillus, De Vita Caesarum (Lives of the Caesars, or The Twelve Caesars).
- Theodor Mommsen et alii, Corpus Inscriptionum Latinarum (The Body of Latin Inscriptions, abbreviated CIL), Berlin-Brandenburgische Akademie der Wissenschaften (1853–present).
- René Cagnat et alii, L'Année épigraphique (The Year in Epigraphy, abbreviated AE), Presses Universitaires de France (1888–present).
- Paul von Rohden, Elimar Klebs, & Hermann Dessau, Prosopographia Imperii Romani (The Prosopography of the Roman Empire, abbreviated PIR), Berlin (1898).
