= Menia gens =

Minor Roman family

The gens Menia was a minor Roman family. None of its members is known to have held any magistracies, but a few are known from inscriptions and mentions in ancient writers.

== Members ==
- Menius Rufus, generally supposed to have been a physician mentioned by Asclepiades Pharmacion, and who must therefore have lived in or before the first century AD. He may be the same Rufus quoted by Andromachus the Younger, according to Galen, and perhaps also by Servilius Damocrates.
- Publius Menius Luscus, a surveyor of grain, buried at Salernum, in Campania.
- Gaius Menius Sabinus, a soldier, who dedicated a statue to Hercules Invictus at Melta, in the province of Moesia Inferior.
- Aulus Menius Amillus Nepos, buried at Thugga in Africa Proconsularis, aged two.

== See also ==
- List of Roman gentes

== Bibliography ==
- Aelius Galenus (Galen), De Antidotis (on Antidotes), De Compositione Medicamentorum Secundum Locos Conscriptorum (On the Composition of Medications According to the Place Prescribed).
- Dictionary of Greek and Roman Biography and Mythology, William Smith, ed., Little, Brown and Company, Boston (1849).
- Theodor Mommsen et alii, Corpus Inscriptionum Latinarum (The Body of Latin Inscriptions, abbreviated CIL), Berlin-Brandenburgische Akademie der Wissenschaften (1853–present).
- René Cagnat et alii, L'Année épigraphique (The Year in Epigraphy, abbreviated AE), Presses Universitaires de France (1888–present).
- M. Khanoussi, L. Maurin, Mourir à Dougga: Receuil des inscriptions funéraires (Dying in Dougga: a Compendium of Funerary Inscriptions, abbreviated MAD), Bordeaux, Tunis (2002).
