= Caesulena gens =

Roman family during the late Republic

The gens Caesulena was a Roman family during the late Republic. It is best known from the orator Lucius Caesulenus, whom Cicero describes as a vulgar man, skilled at drawing suspicions upon persons, and in making them out to be criminals. He was already an old man when Cicero heard him.

== See also ==
- List of Roman gentes
