= Brotia gens =

Ancient Roman family

The gens Brotia was an obscure plebeian family of ancient Rome. No members of this gens are mentioned by Roman writers, but several are known from inscriptions, including at least two potters whose stamps have been found at Cora in Latium.

== Members ==
This list includes abbreviated praenomina. For an explanation of this practice, see filiation.

- Gaius Brotius C. l. Geminus, a freedman buried at Rome, aged twenty-five. His fellow freedman, Gaius Brotius Silo, was buried in the same place.
- Gaius Brotius Philocaus, a potter whose makers' mark has been found on ceramics from Cora and Ostia in Latium. Another inscription from Cora names a potter named Gaius Brotius Philotetus.
- Gaius Brotius Philotetus, a potter whose makers' mark was found on ceramics from Cora. Other pottery stamps from Cora and elsewhere name a Gaius Brotius Philocaus.
- Gaius Brotius C. l. Silo, a freedman buried at Rome, aged thirty. His fellow freedman, Gaius Brotius Geminus, was buried in the same place.
- Titus Brotius Zosimus, buried in a second- or third-century tomb at Thessalonica in Macedonia, built by his wife, the freedwoman Cossutia Fausta.

== See also ==
- List of Roman gentes

== Bibliography ==
- Adolf Kirchhoff et alii, Inscriptiones Graecae (Greek Inscriptions, abbreviated IG), Berlin-Brandenburgische Akademie der Wissenschaften (1860–present).
- Theodor Mommsen et alii, Corpus Inscriptionum Latinarum (The Body of Latin Inscriptions, abbreviated CIL), Berlin-Brandenburgische Akademie der Wissenschaften (1853–present).
