= Saltia gens =

The gens Saltia was an obscure plebeian family at ancient Rome. Hardly any members of this gens are mentioned in history, but others are known from inscriptions.

== Origin ==
The nomen Saltius might be derived from the Latin saltare, to dance. The nomen Saltorius was derived from the related saltor, a dancer. Alternatively, Saltius might be derived from saltus, a glade or ravine.

== Members ==
- Sextus Saltius, together with Lucius Considius, one of the commissioners appointed to establish a colony at Capua in 83 BC. Cicero described their conduct as arrogant, and ridiculed them for their errors.
- Publius Saltius Mysticus, probably a freedman, was a friend of Lucius Aelius Macer, one of the Seviri Augustales at Patavium in Venetia and Histria.
- Saltia Euthycia, probably a freedwoman, one of the friends of Lucius Aelius Macer, named in his funerary inscription.
- Gaius Saltius Victor, a soldier in the third legion, stationed at Lambaesis in Numidia in AD 173.

== See also ==
- List of Roman gentes

== Bibliography ==
- Marcus Tullius Cicero, De Lege Agraria contra Rullum.
- Dictionary of Greek and Roman Biography and Mythology, William Smith, ed., Little, Brown and Company, Boston (1849).
- Theodor Mommsen et alii, Corpus Inscriptionum Latinarum (The Body of Latin Inscriptions, abbreviated CIL), Berlin-Brandenburgische Akademie der Wissenschaften (1853–present).
- George Davis Chase, "The Origin of Roman Praenomina", in Harvard Studies in Classical Philology, vol. VIII, pp. 103–184 (1897).
- John C. Traupman, The New College Latin & English Dictionary, Bantam Books, New York (1995).
