= Titania gens =

Ancient Roman family

The gens Titania was an obscure plebeian family at ancient Rome. No members of this gens are mentioned by Roman writers, but a number are known from inscriptions.

== Origin ==
The nomen Titanius is formed using the suffix -anius, usually indicating derivation from place names. The root of Titanius seems to be a cognomen, Titanus; Chase classifies the nomen among those gentilicia that either originated at Rome, or cannot be shown to have come from anywhere else.

== Members ==
This list includes abbreviated praenomina. For an explanation of this practice, see filiation.

- Gaius Titanius, the former master of Titania Charis, a freedwoman of Aquileia in Venetia and Histria.
- Titania C. l. Charis, a freedwoman, built a first- or second-century sepulchre at Aquileia for her husband, Sextus Teius Januarius, the freedman Quintus Catabronius Martialis, a woman named Titania Secundina, and two persons named Menandrus and Persicus.
- Titania Secundina, buried in a first- or second-century sepulchre at Aquileia, built by the freedwoman Titania Charis for her husband and several others.
- Titania Barbara, dedicated a second-century tomb at Vicus Fificulanus in Samnium for her son, Titus Opsturius Benivolus, aged twenty-seven. She is probably the same Barbara who dedicated a second-century monument at the same place for the freedman Titus Opsturius Dasius, probably her husband.

=== Undated Titanii ===
- Sextus Titanius Cinnamus, buried at Aveia in Samnium.
- Publius Titanius Successus, built a tomb at Rome for his wife, Porcia Zosima.

== See also ==
- List of Roman gentes

== Bibliography ==
- Theodor Mommsen et alii, Corpus Inscriptionum Latinarum (The Body of Latin Inscriptions, abbreviated CIL), Berlin-Brandenburgische Akademie der Wissenschaften (1853–present).
- George Davis Chase, "The Origin of Roman Praenomina", in Harvard Studies in Classical Philology, vol. VIII, pp. 103–184 (1897).
- Giovanni Battista Brusin, Inscriptiones Aquileiae (Inscriptions of Aquileia), Udine (1991–1993).
