= Durmia gens =

Ancient Roman family

The gens Durmia was a plebeian family at ancient Rome. It is known chiefly from a single individual, Marcus Durmius, a triumvir monetalis under Augustus. He minted several coins, including one bearing the head of Augustus on the obverse, and a boar on the reverse; another with a lion feeding upon a stag; and a third with a youthful head and a quadriga, with the inscription Honori, probably referring to the games of Virtus and Honor celebrated by Augustus.

== See also ==
- List of Roman gentes
