= Carisia gens =

The gens Carisia was a Roman family during the latter half of the 1st century BC. The most famous member of the gens was Publius Carisius, who defeated the Astures in Hispania, and took their chief town, Lancia, circa 25 BC. The Astures took up arms again in 22 BC.

There is a coin in which Titus Carisius is identified as triumvir monetalis, and another which mentions Publius Carisius, as legatus and propraetor, together with the word Emerita, apparently referring to the town of Augusta Emerita in Lusitania, which the emperor Augustus established for the emeriti, veterans of the war in Hispania. From this it has been conjectured that the praenomen Titus, assigned to the conqueror of the Astures by Cassius Dio, should instead be Publius.

== See also ==
- List of Roman gentes
