= Spellia gens =

Ancient Roman family

The gens Spellia was an obscure plebeian family at ancient Rome. Few members of this gens appear in history, but several are known from inscriptions. The only Spellius known to have held any magistracy was Publius Spellius Spellianus Sabinus, quaestor in AD 57.

== Origin ==
The nomen Spellius appears to belong to a large class of gentilicia derived from surnames ending in diminutive suffixes such as -ulus, -ellus, or -illus, or in some cases directly from surnames with similar stems, without diminutive suffixes. Most of the Spellii found in epigraphy lived at Rome, but an early example from Campania shows that they used the Oscan praenomen Ovius, suggesting that their ancestors might have been Sabines or Samnites.

== Praenomina ==
Most of the Spellii known from inscriptions bore common Latin praenomina, such as Quintus, Publius, and Gaius. From a filiation, we know that the early Spellii also used the Oscan praenomen Ovius.

== Members ==
This list includes abbreviated praenomina. For an explanation of this practice, see filiation.

- Spellia Ovi f., the wife of Lucius Maccius, and mother of Publius Maccius, who built a tomb at Pompeii in Campania, dating from the latter half of the first century BC, for his parents and his wife, Epidia, along with their heirs, Publius Maccius Velasianus and Publius Maccius Mamianus Fubzanus.
- Quintus Spellius Hermia, named in a sepulchral inscription from Rome, dating to the first half of the first century.
- Quintus Spellius Q. l. Salvius, a freedman named in a sepulchral inscription from Rome, dating to the first half of the first century.
- Quintus Spellius Q. f. Antiochus, a freedman who dedicated a first-century tomb at Rome for his wife, Spellia Rufila, aged twenty.
- Spellia Q. l. Rufila, a freedwoman buried at Rome, in a first-century tomb dedicated by her husband, Quintus Spellius Antiochus.
- Publius Spellius P. f. Spellianus Sabinus, quaestor in AD 57.
- Gaius Spellius Fudidianus, dedicated a second-century tomb at Reate in Samnium for his wife, Seria Expectata.
- Spellius Quadratus, one of the priests of Apollo at Philippi in Macedonia during the second century.
- Spellia Arescusa, dedicated a sepulchre at Rome for herself and her son, whose name has not been preserved.
- Publius Spellius Secundus, along with his brother-in-law, Marcus Ulpius Maximus, dedicated a tomb at Rome for his wife, Ulpia Petillia.

== See also ==
- List of Roman gentes

== Bibliography ==
- Theodor Mommsen et alii, Corpus Inscriptionum Latinarum (The Body of Latin Inscriptions, abbreviated CIL), Berlin-Brandenburgische Akademie der Wissenschaften (1853–present).
- Notizie degli Scavi di Antichità (News of Excavations from Antiquity, abbreviated NSA), Accademia dei Lincei (1876–present).
- René Cagnat et alii, L'Année épigraphique (The Year in Epigraphy, abbreviated AE), Presses Universitaires de France (1888–present).
- George Davis Chase, "The Origin of Roman Praenomina", in Harvard Studies in Classical Philology, vol. VIII, pp. 103–184 (1897).
- Opuscula Romana, Editorial Committee of the Swedish Institute in Rome (1954–2007).
