= Nipia gens =

The Nipia gens was an obscure family in ancient Rome.

== Members ==
- Gaius Nipius Ascanius, mentioned on two ingots in Roman Britain, one from Bossington and the other from Carmel. His cognomen, Ascanius, is rare and only otherwise attested as a name belonging to a freedman in Verona, perhaps indicating that Nipius Ascanius was himself also once a slave. Regardless of his background, he eventually acquired a position within a Roman mining operation in Britain.
- Gaius Nipius Flavianus, mentioned as a procurator on an inscription from Rome.
- Gaius Nipius M. f, mentioned on an inscription from Aquinum.
- Lucius Nipius, an ancient Roman freedman. He erected a stone in the 1st-century CE.
- Nipia Secunda, mentioned on an inscription dated to the 2nd-century CE.

== See also ==
- List of Roman gentes
