= Bantia gens =

The gens Bantia was a Roman family during the time of the Republic. It is known chiefly from a single member, Lucius Bantius. He was a native of Nola in Campania, and served in the Roman army at the Battle of Cannae in 216 B.C. Bantius was wounded and captured by Hannibal, but was treated kindly and set free. He then hoped to convince his city to surrender, but was dissuaded from this action by Marcus Claudius Marcellus, the Roman commander.

== See also ==
List of Roman gentes
