= Sacratoria gens =

The Sacratoria gens was an obscure plebeian family of ancient Rome. Hardly any members of this gens are mentioned in history, but several are known from epigraphy.

== Origin ==
The nomen gentilicium Sacratorius may be derived from the word sacrator ("consecrator"), itself derived from the verb sacro, sacrare ("to sanctify"). However, according to the philologist Margaret M. T. Watmough, the attestation of the family in Casilinum may indicate that the name actually emerged from an Oscan cognate of sacrator. Morphologically, the name is paralleled by other gentilicia such as Calatorius and Fictorius, from calator ("herald") and fictor ("maker"), respectively. M. W. Frederiksen suggests that the name Sacratoria may have some connection with the name of the equestrian Marcus Sacrativir, who is mentioned by Caesar in his commentaries on the Gallic Wars.

== Members ==
This list includes abbreviated praenomina. For an explanation of this practice, see filiation.

- Sacratoria Laudica, named in an inscription from Casilinum in Campania, dating from the latter half of the first century BC. According to Frederiksen, the stele of Sacratoria Laudica and a stele of an individual named Marcus Carulius are the only two known stones from the area that showcases a "lapidary style of lettering."
- Gaius Sacratorius Cinna, built a first-century tomb at Casilinum for his wife, Tudicia Crotis, and their children. The inscription is suspect, and may be modern.
- Numerius Sacratorius, together with his wife, the former masters of Sacratorius Speratus, a freedman named in a first-century inscription from Rome.
- (Numerius) Sacratorius N. Ɔ. l. Speratus, the freedman of Numerius Sacratorius and his wife, named in a first-century inscription from Rome.

== Bibliography ==
- Gaius Julius Caesar, Commentarii de Bello Gallico (Commentaries on the Gallic War).
- Theodor Mommsen et alii, Corpus Inscriptionum Latinarum (The Body of Latin Inscriptions, abbreviated CIL), Berlin-Brandenburgische Akademie der Wissenschaften (1853–present).
- Bullettino della Commissione Archeologica Comunale in Roma (Bulletin of the Municipal Archaeological Commission of Rome, abbreviated BCAR), (1872–present).
- Frederiksen, M. W. (1959). "Republican Capua: A Social and Economic Study". Papers of the British School at Rome. 27: 80–130. doi:10.1017/S0068246200007145. ISSN 2045-239X.
- Watmough, Margaret M. T. (1995). "The Suffix -tor-: Agent-Noun Formation in Latin and the Other Italic Languages". Glotta. 73 (1/4): 80–115. ISSN 0017-1298.
- Weaver, P.R.C. (1991). "Children of Freedmen (and Freedwomen)". In Rawson, Beryl (ed.). Marriage, Divorce, and Children in Sncient Rome. Clarendon Press. ISBN 978-0-19-814918-7.
