= Marcia gens =

Ancient Roman family

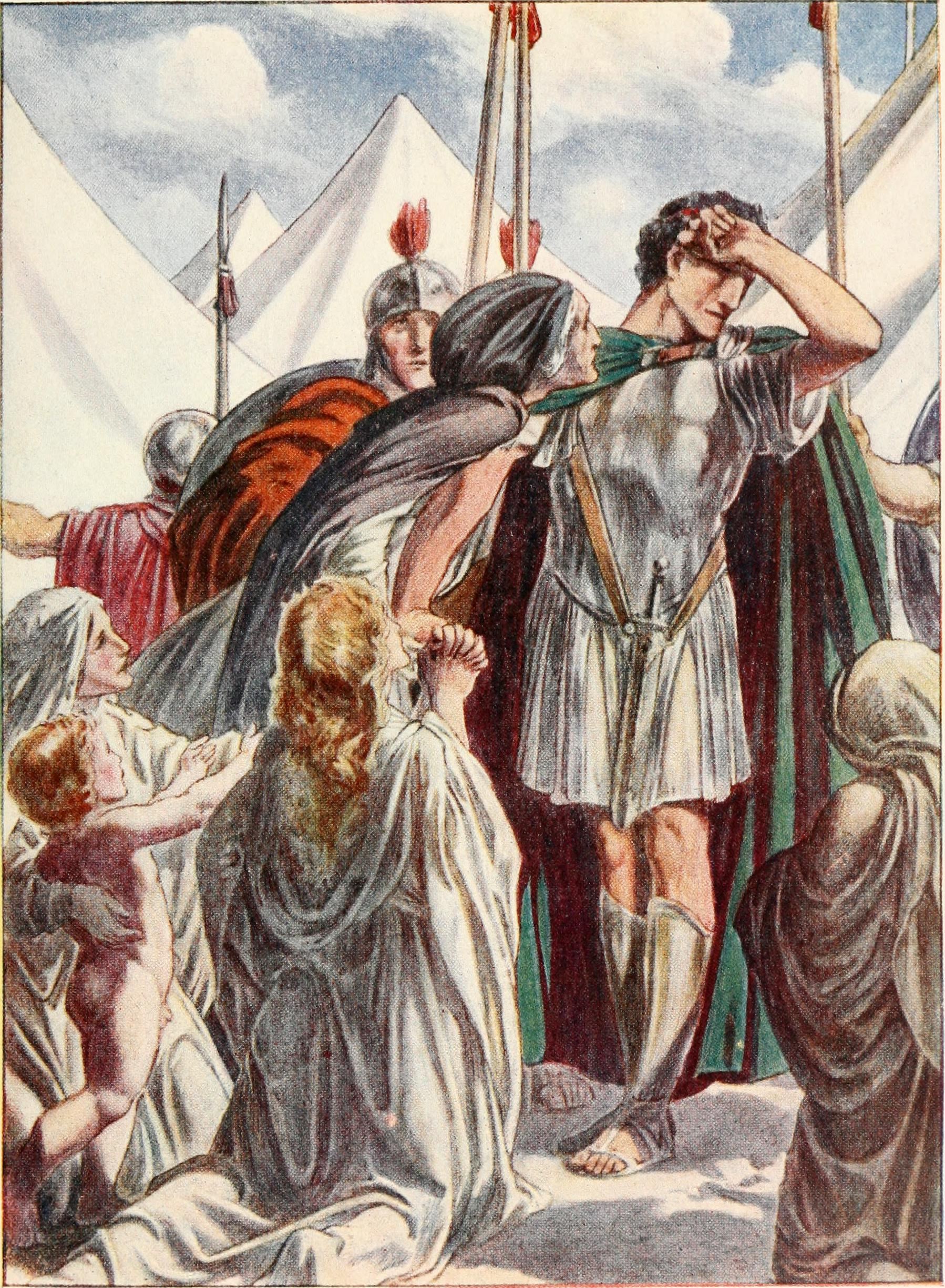
Gaius Marcius Coriolanus reproached by his mother, Veturia, and wife, Volumnia, before the walls of Rome.

The gens Marcia, occasionally written Martia, was one of the oldest and noblest houses at ancient Rome. They claimed descent from the second and fourth Roman Kings, and the first of the Marcii appearing in the history of the Republic would seem to have been patrician; but all of the families of the Marcii known in the later Republic were plebeian. The first to obtain the consulship was Gaius Marcius Rutilus in 357 BC, only a few years after the passage of the lex Licinia Sextia opened this office to the plebeians.

== Origin ==
The Marcii are supposed to have been Sabines, descended from a certain Marcus Marcius of Cures, a kinsman of Numa Pompilius, and his son, Numa Marcius, a childhood friend of Pompilius, who accompanied him to Rome and served as his chief advisor. His son, the younger Numa Marcius, was urban prefect under Tullus Hostilius, and his grandson was Ancus Marcius, the fourth King of Rome.

Although the Roman monarchy was not strictly hereditary, tradition holds that the sons of Ancus Marcius hoped to succeed their father, but were prevented from doing so when his chief advisor, the Etruscan Lucius Tarquinius, took advantage of their absence at the time of the king's death to solicit support for his own claim, and was elected king.

After biding their time for many years, the sons of Marcius gained their revenge by engineering the assassination of Tarquin, but they were again prevented from claiming the throne by a ruse of Tanaquil, the Roman queen, who installed her stepson, Servius Tullius, as regent, until he had sufficient support to rule on his own. The later Marcii claimed descent from Ancus Marcius, but nothing further is recorded of his sons or the generations between them and the Marcii of the early Republic.

The nomen Marcius is a patronymic surname, based on the common praenomen Marcus. There is no reason to doubt that both names are in turn derived from the god Mars, although the precise linguistic process by which this occurred is complex and uncertain.

== Praenomina ==
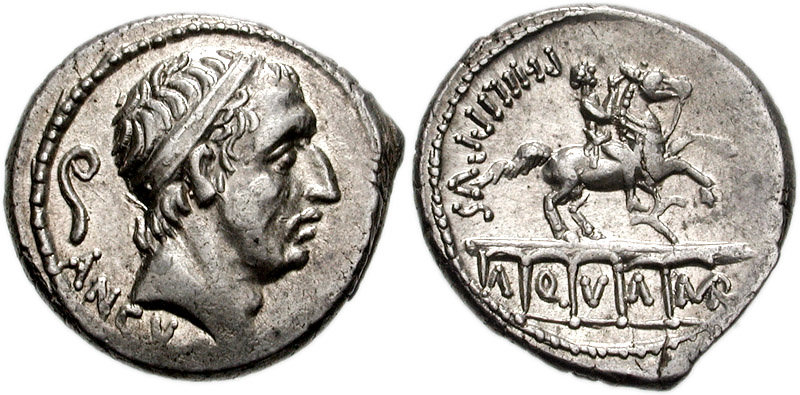
Denarius of L. Marcius Philippus, minted in 56 BC. The obverse is a portrait of Ancus Marcius, the legendary 4th king of Rome and founder of the gens. The reverse depicts the Aqua Marcia, built by Q. Marcius Rex in 144 BC, who also had his statue on the aqueduct.

The Marcii were relatively conservative with respect to praenomina, with only three names accounting for most of the Marcii of the Republic. The main branches of the family used Lucius with either Gaius or Quintus, but not generally both. Other names, among them Gnaeus, Publius, and Marcus, appear only occasionally. Most praenomina of the Marcii were common, but history records one person called Septimus Marcius, which if correct represents an example of a rare Latin praenomen—although it is possible that in this instance, Septimus should be regarded as a surname.

The ancient praenomina Numa and Ancus evidently passed out of use some time before the establishment of the Republic. Both appear to have been Sabine or Oscan, as were all of the persons known to have borne them. No attempt seems to have been made to revive either of them at Rome, either as praenomen or cognomen. Numa seems to be related to Numitor, the name of one of the ancient Kings of Alba Longa, and the grandfather of Romulus, and may share a common root with the praenomen Numerius, which remained in use at Rome for many centuries; Chase suggests a meaning related to "arranger" or "orderer", which would suit both Numa Pompilius and his kinsman, Numa Marcius. For Ancus, otherwise known only from the legendary founder of the Publicia gens, he suggests the meaning of "servant", perhaps in the religious sense.

== Branches and cognomina ==
The only surname associated with the patrician Marcii was Coriolanus, which does not seem to have represented a distinct family of the Marcian gens. During the time of the Republic, the plebeian Marcii bore the cognomina Censorinus, Crispus, Figulus, Libo, Philippus, Ralla, Rex, Rufus, Rutilus, Septimus, Sermo, and Tremulus. Those of Censorinus, Libo, and Philippus are found on coins.

Coriolanus, the earliest cognomen of the Marcii, and the only one generally believed to have belonged to any of the patrician Marcii, was the personal surname of Gaius Marcius, a young soldier whose brilliant charge through the gates of Corioli resulted in the capture of that town from the Volscians. We are told that he had two young sons, from whom one might imagine that the later Marcii were descended; but all of the later Marcii known to history were plebeians. If any of them were descendants of Coriolanus, then they must have stepped down or been removed from the patrician order. The surname Coriolanus does not appear to have been passed down to later generations of the Marcii.

The earliest family of the plebeian Marcii bore the surname of Rutilus, meaning "reddish", probably signifying that the first of this family had red hair. It is through this family that the Marcii emerged from obscurity, only a few years after the passage of the lex Licinia Sextia opened the consulship to the plebeians. The son of Gaius Marcius Rutilus, the first plebeian censor, was himself censor twice, and took the name Censorinus, which was thereafter passed down in this family for several centuries.

After this family, the next cognomen of the Marcii was Philippus, a Greek name, which first appears as the surname of Quintus Marcius, the consul of 281 BC; but this may anticipate the adoption of the name by his descendant, for a certain Lucius Marcius of this family is said to have had some connection with Philip V of Macedon; his son, Quintus Marcius Philippus, was consul in 186 BC, and it may therefore have been Lucius who was the first to obtain the cognomen. The initial cognomen of the family may have been Tremulus, since the filiations given in the Fasti link Quintus Marcius Tremulus, consul in 306, and his probable son Quintus Marcius Philippus, consul in 281. Philippus means "lover of horses", and the name had for centuries been associated with the Macedonian kings; Philip II was the father of Alexander the Great. So wide was the fame of this dynasty, that it is not entirely impossible that the name had reached Rome at an earlier date. The Philippi were proud of this association since Lucius Marcius Philippus, the consul of 91, even put the portrait of Philip V of Macedon on the denarii he minted.

Friedrich Münzer considers that the Marcii bearing the cognomen Figulus ("potter") were linked to the Philippi; the first of that name might have been the second son of Quintus Marcius Philippus, the consul of 281. The Figuli flourished until the end of the Republic, and obtained two consulships.

Ralla seems to be the next surname of the Marcii, first appearing toward the close of the third century BC. It may mean "scraper", and Chase suggests a common origin with the radula, or "scraper", a standard carpentry tool. This family is only found in history for a brief period.

The cognomen Rex, meaning "king", is usually interpreted as an allusion to the family's traditional descent from Numa Pompilius and Ancus Marcius. However, another possibility is that the surname was borne by the descendants of a certain Marcus Marcius, Rex Sacrorum, during the third century BC, and perhaps the first plebeian to hold that office.

== Members ==
This list includes abbreviated praenomina. For an explanation of this practice, see filiation.

=== Early Marcii ===
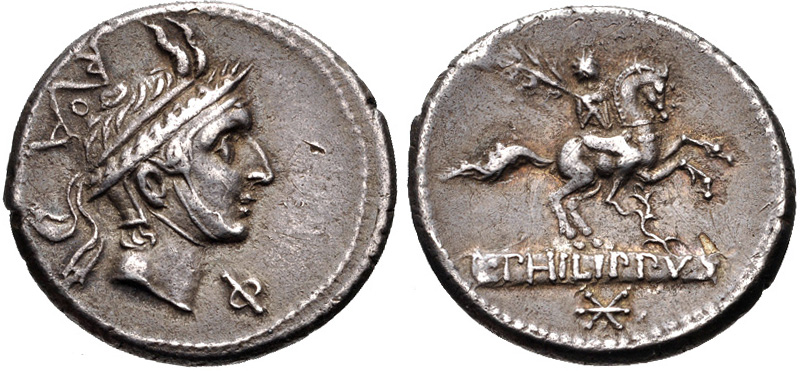
Denarius of Lucius Marcius Philippus, circa 113 BC. The obverse depicts Philip V of Macedon. The reverse displays a triumphator, either Quintus Marcius Tremulus, who triumphed in 306 BC, or Quintus Marcius Philippus, who triumphed in 281.

- Marcus Marcius, a kinsman of Numa Pompilius, who together with Numa's father, Pompo, persuaded him to accept the Roman Kingdom.
- Numa Marcius M. f., the son of Marcus, was an intimate friend of Numa Pompilius, and accompanied him to Rome, where he was enrolled in the Senate, and created the first Pontifex Maximus. According to Plutarch, when the king died after a reign of forty-three years, Numa Marcius contended with Tullus Hostilius for the throne, but being defeated he starved himself to death.
- Numa Marcius Numae f. M. n., the son of Numa Marcius, served as praefectus urbi under Tullus Hostilius. He married Pompilia, daughter of Numa Pompilius, and was the father of Ancus Marcius.
- Ancus Marcius Numae f. Numae n., the fourth King of Rome, according to tradition restored many religious ceremonies that Tullus Hostilius had neglected, but also ably defended the city in times of war. To him are credited many improvements in and around the city of Rome, including the fortification of the Janiculum, the building of a bridge over the Tiber, and the settling of captured Latins on the Aventine Hill. (Note: Niebuhr proposes that the descendants of these captives formed the origin of the plebeians.)
- Gaius Marcius Coriolanus, (Note: Gnaeus in some manuscripts; this was not a regular name of the Marcia gens, but there are one or two other examples.) a legendary Roman soldier who led the charge that captured the Volscian town of Corioli. He subsequently became a fierce opponent of the plebeians, urging that they surrender the hard-won office of tribune of the plebs before grain could be purchased for them during a famine. Rather than face trial for his effrontery, he fled into exile among the Volsci, then led a Volscian force against Rome, withdrawing only at the pleas of his mother and sister. He was the subject of one of Shakespeare's history plays.
- Manius Marcius, plebeian aedile c. 440 BC, offered corn to the people for one as per modius, a very low price. The date of this magistrate is uncertain and still debated.
- Gnaeus (or Gaius) Marcius, tribune of the plebs in 389 BC, prosecuted Quintus Fabius Ambustus, one of three brothers who were sent as ambassadors to the Gauls at Clusium, but who instead of negotiating joined the citizens of Clusium in attacking the Gauls, precipitating the Gallic sack of Rome in 390.

=== Marcii Rutili ===
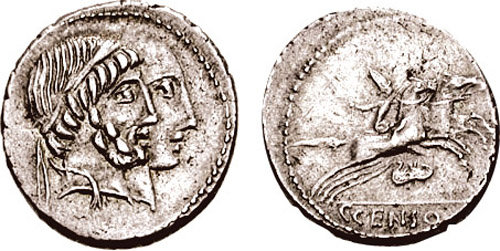
Denarius of Gaius Marcius Censorinus minted in 88 BC, depicting Numa Pompilius and Ancus Marcius, with a desultor on the reverse.

- Gaius Marcius Rutilus, grandfather of the consul.
- Lucius Marcius C. f. Rutilus, father of the consul.
- Gaius Marcius L. f. C. n. Rutilus, consul in 357 BC, and the first plebeian dictator in 356, triumphed over the Etruscans. He was consul for the second time in 352, and became the first plebeian censor in 351 BC. He was consul again in 344 and 342, on the latter occasion the First Samnite War, during which he quelled a conspiracy among the Roman troops.
- Gaius Marcius C. f. L. n. Rutilus Censorinus, tribune of the plebs in 311 BC, he and his colleague, Lucius Atilius, succeeded in passing a law requiring the military tribunes to be elected by the people. He was consul in 310 BC, during the Second Samnite War, together with Quintus Fabius Maximus Rullianus. While Fabius campaigned against the Etruscans, Marcius fought against the Samnites, and captured the town of Allifae, but was seriously wounded in a subsequent battle. He was one of the first plebeian pontiffs in 300 BC, and served as censor in 294; elected censor a second time in 265, he is said to have brought forward a law precluding anyone from holding the censorship twice in the future. He was perhaps the first princeps senatus, appointed c. 275 BC.

=== Marcii Censorini ===
- Gaius Marcius Censorinus, descendant of Gaius Marcius Rutilus, the first plebeian censor.
- Gaius Marcius C. f. Censorinus, father Lucius Marcius Censorinus, the consul of 149 BC.
- Lucius Marcius C. f. C. n. Censorinus, consul in 149 BC, the year of the Third Punic War. He was given command of the Roman fleet, and together with his colleague, Manius Manilius, laid siege to the city; but Marcius had to return to Rome to hold elections for the following year. He was censor in 147.
- Gnaeus Marcius Censorinus, tribune of the plebs in 122 BC, he proposed a law relating to the election of military tribunes.
- Gaius Marcius Censorinus, an orator, tried to prosecute Sulla in the 90s BC. Siding with Cinna and the Marians during the civil wars, he personally slew the consul Gnaeus Octavius in 87. He was put to death by Sulla after the Battle of the Colline Gate in 82.
- Lucius (Marcius) Censorinus, evidently a triumvir monetalis in 82 BC, may have been an officer in the Roman fleet in 70.
- (Marcius) Censorinus, a friend of Quintus Tullius Cicero during his administration of Asia in 59 BC.
- (Marcius) Censorinus, a friend of Publius Licinius Crassus; the two were killed at the Battle of Carrhae in 53 BC.
- Lucius Marcius L. f. C. n. Censorinus, a partisan of Marcus Antonius, was praetor in 43 BC, and consul in 39, receiving a triumph for his military successes in Macedonia. In 17 BC, he was one of the quindecimviri sacris faciundis.
- Gaius Marcius L. f. L. n. Censorinus, consul in 8 BC, and afterward governor of Asia. He died in there in AD 2. The people of Miletus viewed him as their patron and benefactor, and Velleius Paterculus calls him vir demerendis hominibus genitus.

=== Marcii Tremuli et Philippi ===
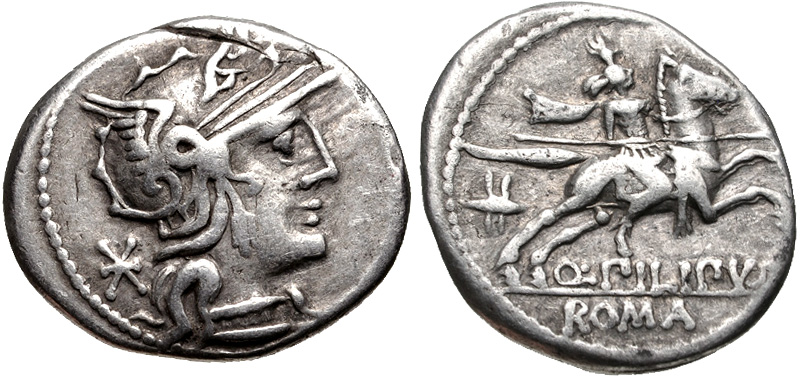
Denarius of Quintus Marcius Philippus, 129 BC. The obverse depicts a head of Roma; on the reverse is a horseman, behind whom is a Macedonian royal helmet.

- Quintus Marcius, grandfather of Quintus Marcius Tremulus, the consul of 306 BC.
- Quintus Marcius Q. f., father of the consul of 306 BC.
- Quintus Marcius Q. f. Q. n. Tremulus, consul in 306 BC, defeated the Hernici and Anagnini, and celebrated a triumph. He was likely the father of Quintus Marcius Philippus, since their filiation match and they were the first two Marcii to use the praenomen Quintus.
- Quintus Marcius Q. f. Q. n. Philippus, consul in 281 BC, triumphed over the Etruscans. In 263 he was nominated magister equitum by the dictator Gnaeus Fulvius Maximus Centumalus.
- Lucius Marcius Q. f. Philippus, father of the consul of 186 BC, was connected in some manner with Philip V of Macedon, although the circumstances are not known. He may have been the first member of this family to bear the surname Philippus, rather than the consul of 281.
- Quintus Marcius L. f. Q. n. Philippus, praetor in 188 BC, received the province of Sicily. He was consul in 186 BC, during which Rome was embroiled in a panic over the discovery of the Bacchanalia. He and his colleague were sent against the Ligurians, but Marcius was badly defeated. Consul for the second time in 169, he had the conduct of the war in Macedonia. He was censor in 164.
- Quintus Marcius Q. f. L. n. Philippus, son of the consul in 186 and 169 BC, served under his father in Macedonia.
- Quintus Marcius Philippus, according to Cicero, was condemned, and went into exile at Nuceria, where he became a citizen. He might possibly be the same as the son of the consul of 186 and 169 BC.
- Quintus Marcius Q. f. Q. n. Philippus, triumvir monetalis in 129 BC. His coins feature a helmet with goat's horns, usually worn by Macedonian kings, an allusion to his cognomen.
- Lucius Marcius Q. f. Q. n. Philippus, a powerful orator of the late Republic. As tribune of the plebs in 104 BC, his attempt to bring about agrarian reform was blocked. He was consul in 91, and found himself in violent opposition to Marcus Livius Drusus, who had him arrested; but so strongly did public opinion sway that Philippus subsequently had all of Drusus' laws nullified. He maintained neutrality during the civil war between Marius and Sulla, and was censor in 86; after Sulla's death he became a supporter of Gnaeus Pompeius.
- Lucius Marcius L. f. Q. n. Philippus, consul in 56 BC, maintained neutrality during the Civil War, remaining on good terms with both Caesar and Cicero. His second wife was Atia; he thus became the step-father of Gaius Octavius, afterward the emperor Augustus, whom he tried to dissuade from becoming Caesar's heir, and was sent by the Senate to negotiate with Antonius. At Augustus' request, he helped construct a number of public buildings. His daughter was the second wife of Cato the Younger.
- Lucius Marcius L. f. L. n. Philippus, the step-brother of Augustus, was tribune of the plebs in 49 BC, praetor in 44, and consul in 38. He married Atia, the younger sister of his father's second wife.
- Quintus Marcius L. f. L. n. Philippus, proconsul of Cilicia in 47 BC. He was initially thought to be the brother of the consul of 56, but he was actually his younger son.
- Marcia L. f. L. n., wife of Cato the Younger, by whom she had several children; she lived for several years with the orator Quintus Hortensius, but returned to Cato after the latter's death. When Cato fled Rome on the outset of the Civil War, in BC 49, he left his family and property in her care.
- Marcia, the wife of Paullus Fabius Maximus, consul in 11 BC, who is said to have spoken to his wife of the secret visit of Augustus to his grandson, Agrippa, in AD 13. According to Tacitus, Marcia disclosed this fact to the empress Livia, leading in some fashion to the death of Fabius shortly thereafter.

==== Family tree of the Marcii Philippi and Figuli ====
Made from Münzer with corrections from Sumner. The nomen Marcius has been omitted for all the men named Tremulus, Philippus, or Figulus. All dates are BC, unless mentioned otherwise. Vertical dotted lines show adoptions.

Stemma Marciorum

Legend
Red	Emperor	Orange	Dictator	Yellow	Censor	Green	Consul

Q. Marcius
Q. Marcius
Q. Tremulus cos 306
Q. Philippus cos 281 mag. eq. 263
L. Philippus	C. Figulus	Marcia	M. Atilius; Regulus cos 267, 256
Q. Philippus cos 186, 169 cens 164	C. Figulus cos 162, 156	T. Figulus
Q. Philippus legate 169
Q. Philippus tr. mon. 129	C. Figulus pr. c. 130-120
C. Julius; Caesar cos. 59, 48, 46–44 dict. 49–44	Julia	M. Atius; Balbus pr. 62	L. Philippus cos 91, cens 86	C. Figulus cos 64
C. Octavius pr. 61	Atia (Note: The two Atiae were sisters. The first one married Octavius, then Philippus after the former's death in 59 BC.)	L. Philippus cos 56	C. Figulus praef 43
Augustus; Emp. 27–14 AD	Atia	L. Philippus pr. 44 cos 38	Q. Philippus procos 47	Marcia	M. Porcius; Cato pr. 54
Marcia	Paullus Fabius; Maximus cos 11	Porcia	M. Junius; Brutus pr. 44	M. Porcius; Cato
Paullus Fabius; Persicus cos 34 AD

=== Marcii Rallae ===
- Marcus Marcius Ralla, praetor urbanus in 204 BC, when he set a date for the trial of Quintus Pleminius, legate pro praetore during the previous year, who was accused of perduellio for robbing the temple of Persephone at Locri, and for torturing and killing two military tribunes. (Note: This identification per Münzer, referring to a fragment of Valerius Antias mentioned by Aulus Gellius, in which a tribune of the plebs named Licinius asks a praetor named Marcus Marcius to set a date for a trial of perduellio. Münzer notes that Ralla is the only Marcus Marcius known to have been praetor, and that Pleminius would have likely have been the defendant. Other authorities, however, have suggested that the trial referred to occurred at a much later date, around BC 73.) In 202, Marcius was one of three legates of Scipio Africanus who escorted the Carthaginian ambassadors to Rome to establish terms for peace at the end of the Second Punic War.
- Quintus Marcius Ralla, tribune of the plebs in 196 BC, joined with his colleague, Gaius Atinius Labeo, in vetoing an attempt by the consul Marcus Claudius Marcellus to prevent the conclusion of peace with Philip V of Macedon. He was then appointed duumvir in 194 and 192 BC, in the former year to dedicate the temple of Fortuna Primigeneia on the Quirinal Hill, and in the latter to dedicate two temples that had been vowed by Lucius Furius Purpureo.

=== Marcii Reges ===
- Marcus Marcius, the first plebeian Rex Sacrorum, probably appointed between 254 and 243 BC, during the tenure of Tiberius Coruncanius, himself the first plebeian Pontifex Maximus. He died in 210.
- Publius Marcius Rex, one of three senatorial envoys sent to restrain the consul Gaius Cassius Longinus in 171 BC. Frustrated with his lack of a command in the Third Macedonian War, Cassius ignored the envoys and marched his army through Illyria to Macedon.
- Quintus Marcius Rex, father of Quintus, the praetor of 144 BC, and probable brother of Publius Marcius Rex, the envoy of 171.
- Quintus Marcius Q. f. Rex, praetor urbanus in 144 BC, he was appointed by the Senate to repair the Appian, Old Aniensian, and Tepulan aqueducts, and to construct a new one, which became known as the Aqua Marcia. He was granted about 180 million sestertii for the task, and his imperium was extended the following year so that he could finish the task.
- Quintus Marcius Q. f. Q. n. Rex, consul in 118 BC, triumphed over the Stoeni, a Ligurian people. The colony of Narbo Martius, established during his consulship, may have been named for him. Marcius' only son died during his consulship, but he stoically performed his duties, even meeting the Senate on the day of his son's burial.
- Marcia Q. f. Q. n., sister of the consul of 118 BC, married Gaius Julius Caesar, grandfather of the dictator.
- Marcia, one of three Vestals condemned for violating their vows of celibacy in 113 BC. She is identified by Münzer as a sister of the consul of 118, who was also prosecuted at the same time; both the trials of the father and daughter had political motivations.
- Quintus Marcius, triumvir monetalis in 118 BC, likely a relative of the consul of 118.
- Quintus Marcius Q. f. (Q. n.) Rex, consul in 68 BC, (Note: His colleague, Lucius Caecilius Metellus, died at the beginning of his year of office, and was not replaced, for which reason Marcius is described as "sole consul" in the fasti.) and afterward proconsul in Cilicia, for which he requested but was not granted a triumph. In 63, the Senate dispatched him to keep watch over Gaius Mallius, one of Catiline's confederates at Faesulae. He had married a sister of Publius Clodius Pulcher, who expected to receive an inheritance from his brother-in-law, but was disappointed when Marcius died without leaving him anything.

=== Marcii Figuli ===
- Gaius Marcius Figulus, father of the consul of 162 BC, and likely son of the consul of 281.
- Gaius Marcius C. f. Q. n. Figulus, was elected consul in 162 BC, and given the province of Cisalpine Gaul, but resigned due to a fault in the auspices. Consul for the second time in 156 BC, he fought against the Dalmatae, and after an initial setback, defeated them and took their capital, Delminium.
- Titus Marcius Figulus, younger brother of the consul of 162 BC, reported that a palm-tree had sprung in the inner court of his house.
- Gaius Marcius C. f. C. n. Figulus, a very distinguished jurist, sought the consulship in the 130's or 120's BC, but was unsuccessful. He was the son of the consul of 162.
- Gaius Marcius C. f. C. n. Figulus, consul in 64 BC, took measures to prevent various unauthorized organizations from influencing the comitia. The following year, he supported Cicero's measures to suppress the conspiracy of Catiline. He was born Quintus Minucius Thermus, but later adopted into the Marcii.
- Gaius Marcius Figulus, a prefect under Publius Cornelius Dolabella in 43 BC.

=== Marcii Libones ===
- Quintus Marcius Libo, triumvir monetalis in 148 BC.
- Marcius Libo, praefectus fabrum (chief engineer in a Roman legion) under Marcus Terentius Varro in 66 BC.

=== Marcii Bareae ===
- Quintus Marcius C. f. C. n. Barea Soranus, consul suffectus in AD 34, afterwards proconsul of Africa.
- Quintus Marcius Barea Soranus, consul suffectus in AD 52, and afterward proconsul of Asia. He and his daughter, Servilia, were denounced before the emperor Nero, and condemned to death in AD 66.
- Marcia Servilia Q. f. Sorana, was denounced before Nero on the grounds that she had consulted soothsayers concerning her father's fate, and condemned to death.
- Quintus Marcius Q. f. C. n. Barea Sura, was a friend of the emperor Vespasian.
- Marcia Q. f. Q. n. Furnilla, the daughter of Sura, was the second wife of the emperor Titus, who divorced her after the death of their daughter, Julia.
- Marcia Q. f. Q. n., the daughter of Sura, was the mother of the emperor Trajan.

=== Others ===
- Marcia, the wife of Marcus Atilius Regulus, consul during the First Punic War. Münzer thinks she was the daughter of Quintus Marcius Philippus, the consul of 281 BC.
- Quintus and Marcus Marcius, two military tribunes serving with the second legion, who were slain in battle against the Boii in 193 BC.
- Marcus Marcius M'. f., triumvir monetalis in 134 BC. His coins refer to Manius Marcius, the plebeian aedile of 440 BC.
- Marcius Rufus, quaestor of Curio for the province of Africa.
- Quintus Marcius Crispus, a military tribune who served under Caesar during the Civil War. In 43 BC, he was proconsul in Bithynia, and brought three legions to the aid of Lucius Staius Murcus, the governor of Syria. They afterward submitted to Gaius Cassius Longinus.
- (Cremutia) Marcia A. f., the daughter of Aulus Cremutius Cordus, preserved her father's works after he had been denounced before Tiberius, and taken his own life.
- Marcius Marcellus, an orator mentioned by Seneca the Elder.
- Marcius L. f. Macer, led a force of gladiators in support of Otho against Vitellius in AD 69. As one of Otho's chief supporters, he was to be made consul suffectus later in the year; but when Vitellius came to power, Macer was removed from the list of consuls designate, so that the emperor could honour his own supporters with consulships.
- Quintus Marcius Turbo, a distinguished general under the emperors Trajan and Hadrian.
- Sextus Marcius Priscus, consul suffectus in AD 72.
- Marcus Marcius Macer, consul suffectus in AD 100.
- Sextus Marcius Honoratus, consul suffectus in AD 110.
- Lucius Marcius Celer Marcus Calpurnius Longus, consul suffectus in AD 144.
- Marcius Quartus, praetorian prefect under Commodus; according to the Historia Augusta, he held that appointment for only five days.
- Marcia Aurelia Ceionia Demetrias, the mistress of Quadratus, who was implicated in a plot to assassinate Commodus, and put to death. Marcia then became the emperor's mistress, and participated in a second, successful conspiracy.
- Marcius Agrippa, a man of humble origin, was appointed governor of Pannonia by the emperor Macrinus in AD 217. He later served as governor of Dacia, and is probably the same Marcius Agrippa who, as admiral of the fleet, had witnessed the death of Macrinus' predecessor, Caracalla.

== See also ==
- List of Roman gentes
- Aqua Marcia
- Marcia (given name)

== Bibliography ==
- Polybius, Historiae (The Histories).
- Valerius Antias, Annales or Historiae (fragmentary).
- Marcus Tullius Cicero, Academica Priora, Brutus, De Divinatione, De Domo Sua, De Lege Agraria contra Rullum, De Legibus, De Natura Deorum, De Officiis, De Provinciis Consularibus, De Republica, Epistulae ad Atticum, Epistulae ad Quintum Fratrem, In Pisonem, Philippicae, Pro Balbo, Pro Gaio Rabirio Perduellionis Reo, Pro Lege Manilia, Pro Plancio.
- Gaius Sallustius Crispus (Sallust), Historiae (The Histories), Bellum Catilinae (The Conspiracy of Catiline).
- Gaius Julius Caesar, Commentarii de Bello Civili (Commentaries on the Civil War).
- Marcus Terentius Varro, De Re Rustica.
- Aulus Hirtius (attributed), De Bello Africo (The African War).
- Diodorus Siculus, Bibliotheca Historica (Library of History).
- Quintus Horatius Flaccus (Horace), Epistulae.
- Dionysius of Halicarnassus, Romaike Archaiologia.
- Titus Livius (Livy), Ab Urbe Condita (History of Rome).
- Publius Ovidius Naso (Ovid), Fasti, Ex Ponto (From Pontus).
- Marcus Velleius Paterculus, Compendium of Roman History.
- Valerius Maximus, Factorum ac Dictorum Memorabilium (Memorable Facts and Sayings).
- Lucius Annaeus Seneca (Seneca the Elder), Controversiae.
- Marcus Annaeus Lucanus (Lucan), Pharsalia.
- Quintus Asconius Pedianus, Commentarius in Oratio Ciceronis In Cornelio (Commentary on Cicero's Oration In Cornelio), Commentarius in Oratio Ciceronis In Pisonem (Commentary on Cicero's Oration In Pisonem, Commentarius in Oratio Ciceronis Pro Milone (Commentary on Cicero's Oration Pro Milone).
- Gaius Plinius Secundus (Pliny the Elder), Naturalis Historia (Natural History).
- Marcus Fabius Quintilianus (Quintilian), Institutio Oratoria (Institutes of Oratory).
- Flavius Josephus, Antiquitates Judaïcae (Antiquities of the Jews).
- Tiberius Catius Silius Italicus, Punica.
- Sextus Julius Frontinus, De Aquaeductu (On Aqueducts).
- Publius Cornelius Tacitus, Annales, Historiae.
- Gaius Suetonius Tranquillus, De Vita Caesarum (Lives of the Caesars, or The Twelve Caesars).
- Plutarchus, Lives of the Noble Greeks and Romans, Moralia.
- Lucius Annaeus Florus, Epitome de T. Livio Bellorum Omnium Annorum DCC (Epitome of Livy: All the Wars of Seven Hundred Years).
- Appianus Alexandrinus (Appian), Punica (The Punic Wars), Bellum Civile (The Civil War), Bellum Illyricum (The Illyrian War).
- Aulus Gellius, Noctes Atticae (Attic Nights).
- Lucius Cassius Dio Cocceianus (Cassius Dio), Roman History.
- Eusebius of Caesarea, Historia Ecclesiastica.
- Aelius Lampridius, Aelius Spartianus, Flavius Vopiscus, Julius Capitolinus, Trebellius Pollio, and Vulcatius Gallicanus, Historia Augusta (Augustan History).
- Sextus Aurelius Victor, De Viris Illustribus (On Famous Men).
- Julius Obsequens, Liber de Prodigiis (The Book of Prodigies).
- Eutropius, Breviarium Historiae Romanae (Abridgement of the History of Rome).
- Paulus Orosius, Historiarum Adversum Paganos (History Against the Pagans).
- Joannes Zonaras, Epitome Historiarum (Epitome of History).
- Barthold Georg Niebuhr, The History of Rome, Julius Charles Hare and Connop Thirlwall, trans., John Smith, Cambridge (1828).
- Thomas Arnold, History of Rome, B. Fellowes, London (1838–1842).
- Dictionary of Greek and Roman Biography and Mythology, William Smith, ed., Little, Brown and Company, Boston (1849).
- August Pauly, Georg Wissowa, et alii, Realencyclopädie der Classischen Altertumswissenschaft, J. B. Metzler, Stuttgart (1894–1980).
- George Davis Chase, "The Origin of Roman Praenomina", in Harvard Studies in Classical Philology, vol. VIII (1897).
- Paul von Rohden, Elimar Klebs, & Hermann Dessau, Prosopographia Imperii Romani (The Prosopography of the Roman Empire, abbreviated PIR), Berlin (1898).
- Friedrich Münzer, Roman Aristocratic Parties and Families, translated by Thérèse Ridley, Johns Hopkins University Press, 1999 (originally published in 1920).
- T. Robert S. Broughton, The Magistrates of the Roman Republic, American Philological Association (1952).
- The Cambridge Ancient History, J. B. Bury et alii, eds., Cambridge University Press (Second Edition, 1970–2005).
- Ernst Badian, "Two More Roman Non-Entities", Phoenix, Vol. 25, No. 2 (Summer, 1971), pp. 134–144.
- G. V. Sumner, "The Lex Annalis under Caesar", Phoenix, Vol. 25, No. 3 (Autumn, 1971), pp. 246–271.
- Michael Crawford, Roman Republican Coinage, Cambridge University Press (1974, 2001).
- Andrew Michael Burnett, "The Authority to Coin in the Late Republic and Early Empire", The Numismatic Chronicle, Seventh Series, Vol. 17 (137) (1977), pp. 37–63.
- Paul A. Gallivan, "The Fasti for A.D. 70–96", in Classical Quarterly, vol. 31, pp. 186–220 (1981).
- Ronald Syme, The Augustan Aristocracy, Oxford University Press, 1986.
- Richard J. Evans, "A note on the consuls from 69 to 60 B.C.", Acta Classica, Vol. 31 (1988), pp. 97–105.
- T. Robert S. Broughton, "Candidates Defeated in Roman Elections: Some Ancient Roman "Also-Rans"", Transactions of the American Philosophical Society, Vol. 81, No. 4 (1991), pp. i–vi+1–64.
- Patrick McGushin, Sallust: The Histories Clarendon Press, Oxford (1992).
- Ronald Syme, "C. Marcius Censorinus in the East," in Anatolica, Clarendon Press, Oxford (1995), pp. 302–307.
- Antony Kamm, The Romans, An Introduction, Routledge, London (1995).
- Francis X. Ryan, Rank and Participation in the Republican Senate, Stuttgart, Franz Steiner Verlag (1998).
- Claude Eilers, Roman Patrons of Greek Cities, Oxford University Press (2002).
- John Briscoe, A Commentary on Livy, books 41–45, Oxford University Press (2012).
- Alison E. Cooley, The Cambridge Manual of Latin Epigraphy, Cambridge University Press (2012).
- Werner Eck, "Die Fasti consulares der Regierungszeit des Antoninus Pius, eine Bestandsaufnahme seit Géza Alföldys Konsulat und Senatorenstand" (The Consular Fasti for the Reign of Antoninus Pius: an Inventory since Géza Alföldy's Konsulat und Senatorenstand), in Studia Epigraphica in Memoriam Géza Alföldy, Werner Eck, Bence Fehér, Péter Kovács, eds., Bonn, pp. 69–90 (2013).
- Charles Goldberg, "Priests and Politicians: rex sacrorum and flamen Dialis in the Middle Republic", Phoenix, Vol. 69, No. 3/4 (Fall-Winter/automne-hiver 2015), pp. 334–354.
