= Tullus =

Tullus may refer to

- Tullus (praenomen), an ancient Roman praenomen
- Tullus Hostilius, legendary king of Rome
- Tullus (comics), a comic book character
