= List of pontifices maximi =

The pontifex maximus was the chief priest of the ancient Roman religion, and head of the Collegium Pontificum ("College of Pontiffs").

== Background ==
According to legend, the first Pontifex Maximus was Numa Marcius, who was appointed by his friend, Numa Pompilius, the second King of Rome. No other Pontifices Maximi are mentioned in surviving sources until the overthrow of the Roman monarchy, traditionally occurring in 509 BC. Once appointed, the Pontifex Maximus held his position for life; a new Pontifex Maximus was normally appointed following his death.

This list includes all of the Pontifices Maximi mentioned by historians and other ancient writers, down to the end of the Roman Republic. The list prior to the time of the First Punic War is presumably incomplete, as fewer than a dozen holders of the office are known from the first two-and-a-half centuries of the Republic. The last Pontifex Maximus of the Republican era was Lepidus, the triumvir. Upon his death, Augustus assumed the office, further consolidating his authority over the Roman state.

In the imperial era, it was customary for the emperor to serve as Pontifex Maximus. Although Constantine the Great reportedly converted to Christianity, and most of his successors were Christians, they continued to hold the office until the time of Gratian (375–383), who declined it, instead assuming the title of Pontifex Inclytus, which was not associated with the former pagan state religion. The title of Pontifex Maximus thereafter fell into abeyance. After the sack of Constantinople and the end of the Eastern Roman Empire in the fifteenth century, the title was revived by the Popes, notwithstanding its pagan origins, and is now a part of the papacy's official titulature. See List of popes.

== Pontifices maximi of the Roman Kingdom ==
- Numa Marcius. The first Pontifex Maximus, according to Livy.

== Pontifices maximi of the Roman Republic ==
The Pontifex Maximus held his office for life, but the date of death is not known for every man who held the office, and the name of the Pontifex is not recorded for every period. Unless otherwise noted, dates and citations of primary sources are from T.R.S. Broughton's three-volume The Magistrates of the Roman Republic (American Philological Association, 1951, 1986).

- 509 BC: Gaius Papirius or Marcus Horatius Pulvillus
- 449: either Quintus Furius or Marcus Papirius
- 431: Aulus Cornelius Cossus, usually identified with the famous general of this era who was consul in 428
- 420: Spurius Minucius
- 390: Marcus Folius, likely the M. Folius Flaccinator who was consular tribune in 433, although Plutarch names him Fabius
- 332: Publius Cornelius Calussa
- 304: Cornelius (Scipio) Barbatus, possibly the Publius Cornelius Scipio Barbatus who was consul in 328, or if his praenomen was Gnaeus, the father of the consul of 298
- ca. 254–243: Tiberius Coruncanius, first plebeian to become Pontifex Maximus, and first Roman jurist and professor of law; consul in 280 BC
- ca. 243–221: Lucius Caecilius Metellus (d. 221), credited with saving the Palladium when the Temple of Vesta was on fire; removed from office or resigned around 237
- 221–213: Lucius Cornelius Lentulus Caudinus (d. 213)
- 212–183: Publius Licinius Crassus Dives (d. 183)
- 183–180: Gaius Servilius Geminus (d. 180)
- 180–152: Marcus Aemilius Lepidus (d. 152)
- 152–150: vacant
- 150–141: Publius Cornelius Scipio Nasica Corculum (d. 141)
- 141–132: Publius Cornelius Scipio Nasica Serapio (d. 132), probably succeeded his father and elected in absentia; first Pontifex to leave Italy (as compelled by the senate to escape a plot against his life), and the first to die outside Italy
- 132–130: Publius Licinius Crassus Dives Mucianus (killed in battle 131 BC, Asia Minor), first Pontifex to leave Italy by choice, and the first to die in battle
- 130–late 114: Publius Mucius Scaevola succeeding his brother, and last Pontifex Maximus to publish the Annales Maximi
- by December 114–103: Lucius Caecilius Metellus Dalmaticus, with start date determined by his presiding as Pontifex Maximus over a Vestal trial
- 107-ca.,103-ca.: Quintus Servilius Caepio
- 103–ca. 89: Gnaeus Domitius Ahenobarbus (d. 88)
- ca. 89–82: Quintus Mucius Scaevola (d. 82), first Pontifex to be openly murdered (in the Temple of Vesta, with his body thrown into the Tiber)
- 82–63: Quintus Caecilius Metellus Pius (d. ca 63 BC)
- 63–44: Julius Caesar, elected over two higher-ranking candidates for the office, Quintus Lutatius Catulus and Publius Servilius Vatia Isauricus
- 44–13: Marcus Aemilius Lepidus (died 13 BC)
- 13 BC–AD 14: Augustus, the first emperor, assumed the title of Pontifex Maximus upon the death of Lepidus. Thereafter, the office was held by the emperors until the late fourth century. (When there was more than one emperor, the pontifex maximus was only held by one of the two emperors. For example, in AD 161, when Marcus Aurelius and Lucius Verus started their co-reign as emperors, only Marcus Aurelius was the pontifex maximus).
