= Ancus Marcius =

King of Rome from c. 640 to 616 BC

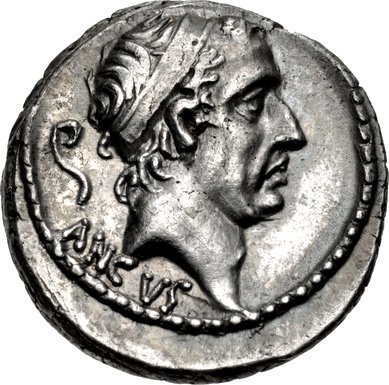
- Ancus Marcius depicted on a 57 BC denarius

King of Rome
- Reign: c. 640–616 BC
- Predecessor: Tullus Hostilius
- Successor: Lucius Tarquinius Priscus
- Father: Numa Marcius
- Mother: Pompilia

Ancus Marcius (Classical Latin: [ˈaŋkʊs ˈmaːrkiʊs]) was the legendary fourth king of Rome, who traditionally reigned for 24 years. Upon the death of the previous king, Tullus Hostilius, the Roman Senate appointed an interrex, who in turn called a session of the assembly of the people who elected the new king. Ancus is said to have ruled by waging war as Romulus did, while also promoting peace and religion as Numa Pompilius did.

Ancus Marcius was believed by many Romans to have been the namesake of the Marcii, a plebeian family.

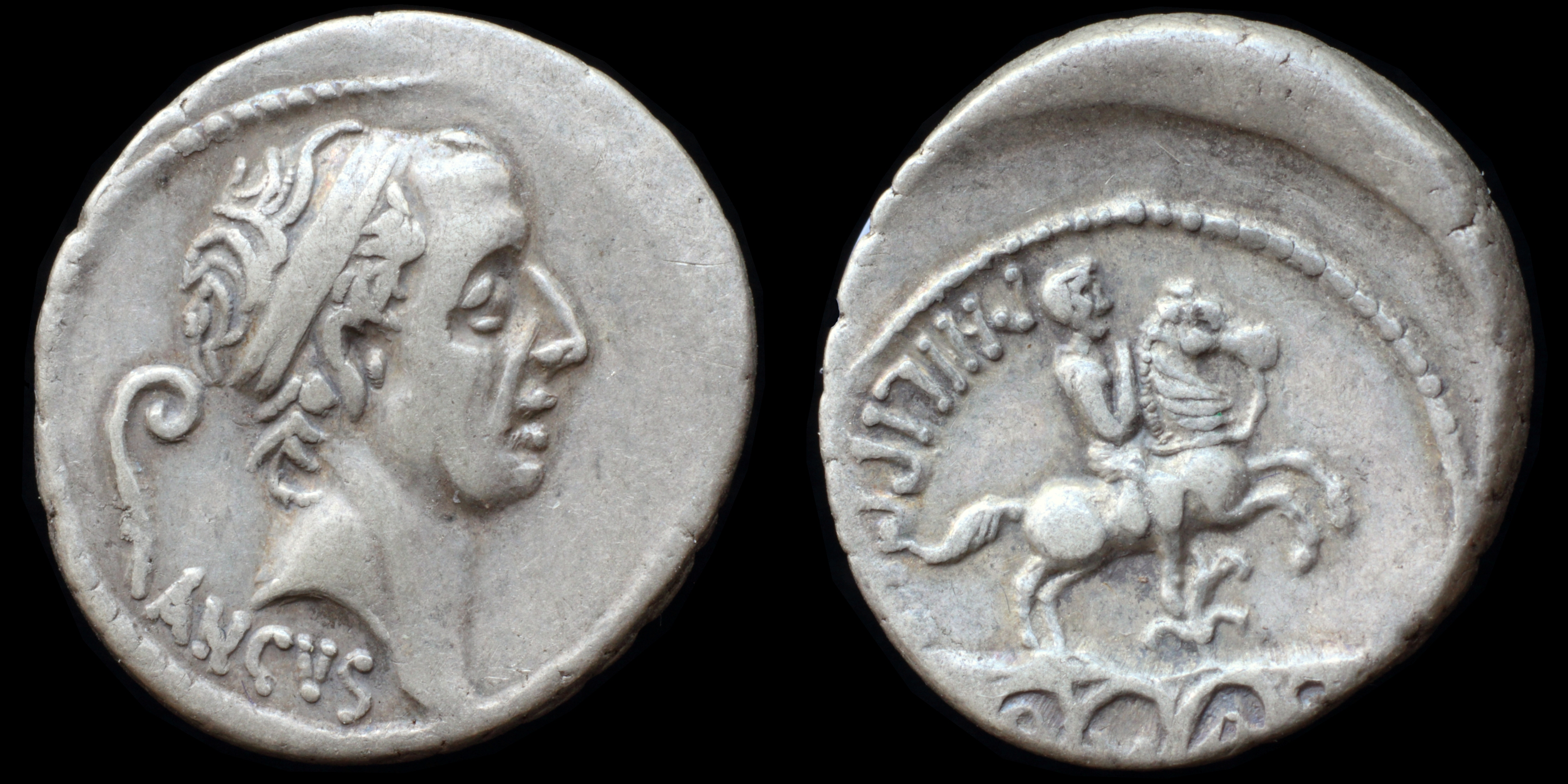

First side of the image: O: diademed head of Ancus Marcius, lituus behind ANCVS
Second side of the image: R: equestrian statue on 5 arches of aqueduct (Aqua Marcia)

PHILIPPVS

A-Q-V-A-(MAR)
Silver denarius struck by Lucius Marcius Philippus in Rome 56 BC.

== Background ==
Ancus was the son of Marcius (himself the son of Rome's first pontifex maximus Numa Marcius) and Pompilia (daughter of Numa Pompilius). Ancus Marcius was thus the grandson of Numa and therefore a Sabine. According to Festus, Marcius was surnamed Ancus because of his crooked arm (ancus signifying "bent" in Latin).

== First acts as King ==
According to Livy, Ancus's first act as king was to order the Pontifex Maximus to copy the text concerning the performance of public ceremonies of religion from the commentaries of Numa Pompilius to be displayed to the public on wooden tablets, so that the rites of religion should no longer be neglected or improperly performed. When Tullus was king, he repealed the Numa-created religious edicts that had been in place before.

== War ==
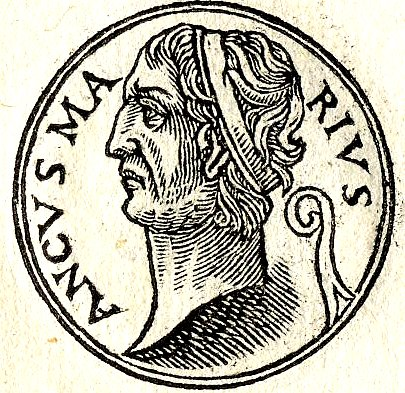
Fictional 16th-century depiction in the Promptuarii Iconum Insigniorum

According to Livy, the accession of Ancus emboldened the Latin League, who assumed that the new king would follow the pious pursuit of peace adopted by his grandfather, Numa Pompilius. The Latins accordingly made an incursion on Roman lands, and gave a contemptuous reply to a Roman embassy seeking restitution for the damage. Ancus responded by declaring war on the Latins. Livy says that this event was notable as the first time that the Romans declared war by means of the rites of the fetials.

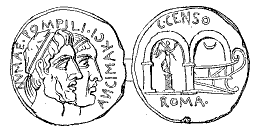
A coin depicting Ancus Marcius and Numa Pompilius side-by-side

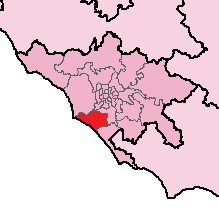
Ostia on a map of Rome (highlighted in bright red)

Ancus Marcius marched from Rome with a newly levied army and took the Latin town of Politorium (situated near the town of Lanuvium) by storm. Its residents were removed to settle on the Aventine Hill in Rome as new citizens, following the Roman traditions from wars with the Sabines and Albans. When the other Latins subsequently occupied the empty town of Politorium, Ancus took the town again and demolished it. The Latin villages of Tellenae and Ficana were also sacked and demolished.

The war then focused on the Latin town of Medullia. The town had a strong garrison and was well fortified. Several engagements took place outside the town and the Romans were eventually victorious. Ancus returned to Rome with a large amount of loot. More Latins were brought to Rome as citizens and were settled at the foot of the Aventine near the Palatine Hill, by the temple of Murcia.

Ancus Marcius incorporated the Janiculum into the city, fortifying it with a wall and connecting it with the city by a wooden bridge across the Tiber, the Pons Sublicius. To protect the bridge from enemy attacks, Ancus had the end that was facing the Janiculum fortified. Ancus also took over Fidenae to expand Rome's influence across the Tiber. On the land side of the city he constructed the Fossa Quiritium, a ditch fortification. He also built Rome's first prison, the Mamertine prison.

He then extended the Roman territory, founding the port of Ostia, establishing salt-works around the port, and taking the Silva Maesia, an area of coastal forest north of the Tiber, from the Veientes. He expanded the temple of Jupiter Feretrius to reflect these territorial successes. According to a reconstruction of the Fasti Triumphales, Ancus Marcius celebrated at least one triumph, over the Sabines and Veientes.

== Death and successor ==
Ancus Marcius is reported to have died of natural causes after a rule of 24 years. He had two sons, one of which would likely take the throne. A member of Ancus' court, Lucius Tarquinius Priscus, ensured that Ancus' sons would be out of Rome so he could put together an election where he would gain the support of the Roman people.

Ancus Marcius was succeeded by his friend Lucius Tarquinius Priscus, who was ultimately assassinated by the sons of Ancus Marcius. Later, during the Republic and the Empire, the prominent gens Marcia claimed descent from Ancus Marcius.

Legendary titles
| Preceded by Tullus Hostilius | King of Rome; 642–617 BC | Succeeded by Lucius Tarquinius Priscus |
