= Pompilia gens =

Ancient Roman family

The gens Pompilia was a plebeian family at ancient Rome during the time of the Republic. The only member of the gens to attain any prominence in the Roman state was Sextus Pompilius, who was tribune of the plebs in 420 BC; however, persons by this name are occasionally found throughout the history of the Republic.

== Origin ==
The first and most illustrious of the Pompilii at Rome was Numa Pompilius, the second King of Rome. By all accounts, Pompilius was a Sabine, renowned for his wisdom, and living at the town of Cures at the time of the death of Romulus. The tradition reported by the Roman historians is that the selection of a foreigner over one of the leading Roman citizens was urged by Rome's considerable Sabine populace, which had not only enjoyed equal status with the Latin inhabitants of Rome, but had their own king, Titus Tatius, ruling alongside Romulus for part of his reign. Tatius had been killed in a riot some years earlier, and the Sabines at Rome were eager to be governed by one of their kindred once more.

A common practice in the later Republic was for gentes to claim descent from figures associated with the founding of Rome, the companions of Aeneas, or individuals who lived in the time of the kings. At least five prominent gentes claimed descent from Numa Pompilius, but if the Pompilii themselves did so, that tradition has not survived. (Note: The gentes which are known to have claimed descent from Numa were the Aemilii, Calpurnii, Pinarii, and Pomponii, by sons named Mamercus, Calpus, Pinus, and Pompo, respectively; and, through a daughter, Pompilia, the Marcii.)

The nomen Pompilius is a patronymic surname, based on the Sabine praenomen Pompo, the Oscan cognate of the Latin praenomen Quintus, meaning "fifth". The Latin equivalent of Pompilius was therefore Quinctilius, and in fact there was a family of that name at Rome. Tradition states that Numa's father was named Pompo, and that he had a son by that name as well, which seems to confirm the etymology. The Pomponii claimed descent from this son, and both their nomen and that of Pompeius are occasionally confounded with Pompilius in the ancient writers.

== Members ==
=== The family of Numa ===
- Pompo Pompilius, the father of Numa.
- Numa Pompilius Pomponis f., the second King of Rome.
- Mamercus Pompilius Numae f. Pomponis n., claimed as the ancestor of the gens Aemilia.
- Pompo (Pompilius) Numae f. Pomponis n., claimed as the ancestor of the gens Pomponia.
- Calpus (Pompilius) Numae f. Pomponis n., claimed as the ancestor of the gens Calpurnia.
- Pinus (Pompilius) Numae f. Pomponis n., claimed as the ancestor of the gens Pinaria; but the Pinarii had another tradition, according to which their family originated long before the founding of the city.
- Pompilia Numae f. Pomponis n., married Numa Marcius, the son of Numa Marcius, one of the companions of Numa Pompilius, who became the first Pontifex Maximus. Ancus Marcius, the fourth King of Rome, was the son of the younger Marcius and Pompilia.

=== Others ===
- Sextus Pompilius, tribune of the plebs in 420 BC.
- Pompilius, an ancient Roman poet.
- Marcus Pompilius Andronicus, a Syrian by birth, taught rhetoric at Rome in the early first century BC.
- Pompilius, an eques mentioned as being among friends of Catiline.
- Pompilius Rufus, instructed by Marcus Aurelius on how to dispose of an estate, the owner of which had manumitted his slaves by will, but who had no descendants to carry the will into effect.

== See also ==
- List of Roman gentes

== Bibliography ==
- Quintus Tullius Cicero, De Petitione Consulatus (attributed).
- Titus Livius (Livy), History of Rome.
- Plutarchus, Lives of the Noble Greeks and Romans.
- Gaius Suetonius Tranquillus, De Illustribus Grammaticis (The Illustrious Grammarians).
- Institutes of Justinian, Thomas Collett Sandars, ed.
- Dictionary of Greek and Roman Biography and Mythology, William Smith, ed., Little, Brown and Company, Boston (1849).
- Herbert A. Grueber, Coins of the Roman Republic in the British Museum, William Clowes and Sons, Ltd., London (1910).
- Michael Grant, Roman Myths (1971).
