= Forgotten Tales of Love and Murder =

2001 short story by Edgar Rice Burroughs

- cover art from first edition
- Author: Edgar Rice Burroughs
- Language: English
- Genre: Short stories
- Publisher: Guidry & Adkins
- Publication date: 2001
- Publication place: United States
- Media type: Print (hardcover)
- Pages: 283

Forgotten Tales of Love and Murder is a collection of short stories by Edgar Rice Burroughs, edited by Patrick H. Adkins and illustrated by Danny Frolich. It was first published in hardcover in 2001 by Guidry & Adkins, a publishing partnership of Burroughs fans John H. Guidry and Patrick H. Adkins, as part of their "Tarzana Project," intended to bring into print all the author's previously unpublished or uncollected works.

The book collects eighteen stories by Burroughs, together with a spoof autobiographical piece and an introduction by the editor. The pieces vary in tone and genre, spanning the author's entire career, and represent essentially all of his short works not previously collected in book form.

== Contents ==
- "Introduction" (Patrick H. Adkins)
- "An Autobiographical Sketch" (1941).
- "Jonathan's Patience" (c. 1910)
- "The Avenger" (1912) – a tale of vengeance
- "For The Fool's Mother" (1912) – a Western
- "The Little Door" (1917) - a romantic horror story
- "Calling All Cars" (1931) – a mystery
- "Elmer" (1936) – a science fiction story previously published in an editorially revised form as "The Resurrection of Jimber-Jaw"
- "The Strange Adventure of Mr. Dinnwiddie" (1940) – a humorous tale
- "Misogynists Preferred" (1941) – a humorous tale
- "Uncle Bill" (1944) – a horror story
- "The Red Necktie" (c. 1932) – a mystery
- "Murder: A Collection of Short Murder Mystery Puzzles" (c. 1932-1940) – a series of mysteries investigated by Police Inspector Muldoon, whom the author aids as his "Dr. Watson"
  - "Murder at Midnight"
  - "Bank Murder"
  - "The Terrace Drive Murder"
  - "The Gang Murder"
  - "The Lightship Murder"
  - "The Dark Lake Murder"
  - "Who Murdered Mr. Thomas?"
  - "The Dupuyster Case" (unfinished)
