= Danny Frolich =

American artist from New Orleans

Danny Frolich (a/k/a Dany Frolich) is an American artist from New Orleans. He designed many Mardi Gras floats, scrolls, Mardi Gras dubloons, and cups.

He was active in science fiction fanzines of the early 1970s, and in the short-lived New Orleans underground comix scene of that era, primarily as a contributor to the underground publications of Big Muddy Comics. His work appeared in (among others) Swamp Fever and Cosmic Capers, and Big Muddy published one issue of Frolich's own Trivial Annoyances in 1972. He has worked as an illustrator (he did the cover and interior illustrations for Left of Africa by Hal Clement, The Magic Talisman by John Blaine, Comics Revue magazine, the 2001 release of Forgotten Tales of Love and Murder by Edgar Rice Burroughs, and the 2016 Tullus comic book.

As of 1999, he was living and working in Destin, Florida.

Frolich has been an active science fiction fan. His art appeared in fanzines and journals such as Orcrist.

Danny & his wife Lorrie Ricard Frolich have been living in Destin FL since 2008. He is still working, freelance.
