= Sunday Pix =

Comic book

Publication information
- Publisher: David C. Cook
- Schedule: Weekly
- Format: Print
- Publication date: May 1, 1949
- No. of issues: Ongoing

Sunday Pix is an American Christian comic book published weekly by the David C. Cook publishing company, beginning 1 May 1949. In the late 1960s, the title was changed to Bible-in-Life Pix, and in the 1990s the title was changed to Pix. It is usually sold or given away to Sunday school pupils. Subscriptions are available, but it is not commonly sold on newsstands or in comic book shops.

== Format ==
Originally, Sunday Pix was an 8.5 x 11 inch self-covered booklet containing 12 pages of comics and features. In 1963, the size changed to 5.5 x 8.5 inches and the page count increased to 16 pages. This page count has decreased over the years. In the early 1980s, the magazine became almost all reprint, with more text pages and fewer comics. Today, Pix is published with 8 pages on slick paper.

== Content ==
The two longest running features in Sunday Pix are The Bible in Pictures and Tullus. This last feature, the adventures of a Christian youth in Roman times, is the story most sought after by collectors. There have been six paperback reprints of Tullus stories.
