= Tullus Hostilius =

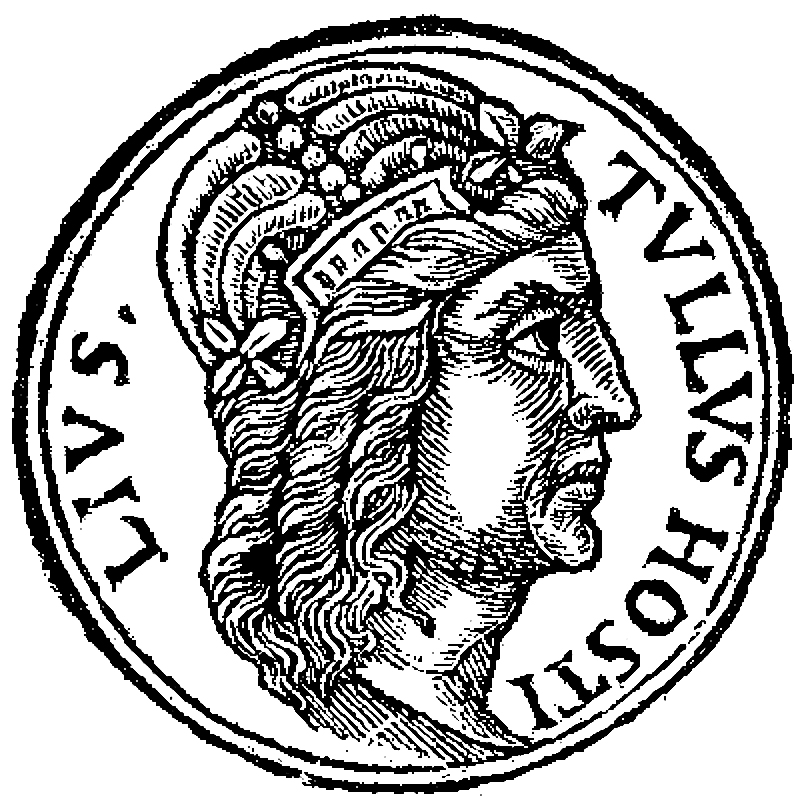
- Portrait of Tullus Hostilius from Guillaume Rouillé's Promptuarium Iconum Insigniorum (1553).

King of Rome
- Reign: c. 672–640 BC
- Predecessor: Numa Pompilius
- Successor: Ancus Marcius
- Died: c. 640 BC; Rome

Tullus Hostilius (Latin pronunciation: [ˈtʊlːʊs (h)ɔsˈtiːliʊs]; r. c. 672 – c. 640 BC) was the legendary third King of Rome. He succeeded Numa Pompilius and was succeeded by Ancus Marcius. In sharp contrast to his predecessor's peaceable and pious character, Tullus was characterised as an exceptionally warlike king. According to Titus Livius, Tullus believed that his predecessor's era of peace had weakened Rome and deliberately sought out war; in some Roman sources he is depicted as an even more warlike figure than the legendary founder Romulus. The most prominent event of his reign was the defeat of Rome's ancient rival Alba Longa and the complete destruction of that city. He is also credited with constructing the first Roman senate building, the Curia Hostilia, and the open assembly space Comitium; founding the Fetial college that conducted Rome's international treaties; establishing the second Salii college, the Salii Collini; and expanding Rome's cavalry.

== Family and origins ==
Tullus Hostilius came from a Roman family of Alban descent. According to Dionysius of Halicarnassus, the earliest known member of the family was Hostus Hostilius, who had migrated to Rome from Medullia, a city colonised by Romulus whose population was of Alban stock. Hostus fought alongside Romulus in many campaigns and fell in the front ranks during the war against the Sabines. In commemoration of his valour, a monument was erected to him in the main section of the Roman Forum, with an inscription attesting to his bravery.

Ancient sources disagree on the identity of Hostus Hostilius's wife. According to Dionysius of Halicarnassus, Hostus's wife was the daughter of Hersilia, the woman who led the Sabine women onto the battlefield between the two armies and played the central role in brokering the peace treaty between Rome and the Sabines. The more widely attested version holds that Hersilia was herself the wife of Romulus; Plutarch recorded both versions and drew attention to the discrepancy between the sources. This connection suggests that Tullus had a mixed family heritage of both Latin and Sabine origin.

Hostus Hostilius died young, leaving behind a small son; this son grew up, married a noblewoman, and from that union Tullus Hostilius was born. His grandfather's campaigns fought shoulder to shoulder with Romulus honoured the family's legacy and proved a decisive factor in Tullus's later election as king.

== Accession to the throne ==
=== The election process ===
Following the death of Numa Pompilius after a reign of forty-three years, Rome entered the traditional interregnum period. The Senate appointed a series of interreges, each serving for five days, whose sole task was to identify a candidate for kingship and present him to the people. The interrex who put forward the candidate convened the Curiate Assembly after senatorial approval, and Tullus Hostilius was elected king by acclamation. Election alone was insufficient, however; before formally entering office it was also necessary to obtain the auspicia (auspices), representing the sanction of the gods.

=== Rivalry for the throne ===
According to Plutarch, Numa's Pontifex Maximus, Numa Marcius, contended with Tullus Hostilius for the throne, but being defeated in the contest he starved himself to death. Numa Marcius's son, also named Numa Marcius, later served as praefectus urbi (city prefect) under Tullus, and would become the father of Tullus's successor Ancus Marcius. This detail illustrates how deeply intertwined the political networks of the early Roman monarchy were.

The senators proclaimed Tullus king by highlighting his grandfather's heroism in battle alongside Romulus and his Roman lineage. Romans who believed that Numa Pompilius's long era of peace had left Rome weakened were searching for a warlike leader once again, and Tullus was the name that answered that expectation.

== Domestic policy and urban developments ==
=== Distribution of land to the people ===
According to Dionysius of Halicarnassus, upon taking power Tullus immediately made an important populist move, distributing the large royal estates left by previous kings equally among landless and impoverished Romans. The lands that Romulus had seized in war and subsequent kings had used as personal property were parcelled out among landless citizens; Tullus publicly declared that his own inheritance was sufficient for both sacrifices and personal expenses. This act earned Tullus considerable goodwill among the people and removed the necessity for the poorer classes to work as virtual serfs on others' fields.

=== Incorporation of the Caelian Hill ===
Tullus incorporated the Caelian Hill within Rome's walls and allocated land there for housing, for the benefit of Romans who could find no accommodation in the city; he himself resided on the hill for a time. Subsequently, after the conquest and destruction of Alba Longa, the greater part of the displaced Alban population was resettled on the Caelian.

=== Expansion of the cavalry ===
According to Livy, following the conquest of Alba Longa Tullus substantially increased the number of equites (cavalry). To the cavalry force of 300 that had existed since the time of Romulus, ten turmae (squadrons) of Albans were added, bringing the total to 600. The newly added units were organised as three new centuries (centuriae) named the Ramnes, Titienses, and Luceres Posteriores. This reorganisation is regarded as one of the first large-scale reinforcements of the Roman army.

== War with Alba Longa ==
=== The outbreak of conflict ===
Alba Longa, situated approximately 19 km south-east of Rome, became the central focus of Tullus's reign. Tensions between Rome and Alba Longa began when the farmers of both sides launched raids across the border, seizing each other's livestock and produce. When the Alban government sent envoys to Rome to complain of these attacks, Tullus dismissed the grievance by asserting that the other side had begun the matter first. After the failure of mutual embassies the two cities began preparing for war.

=== The Horatii and Curiatii ===
Once the two armies faced each other on the battlefield, the Alban dictator Mettius Fufetius put forward a proposal to avoid heavy casualties: three brothers chosen from each city would fight one another, and the victorious side would impose its sovereignty over the other. Under this arrangement, the outcome of the war would be decided by the fate of just six men rather than by the two full armies engaging.

The Horatii brothers, representing Rome, and the Curiatii brothers, representing Alba Longa, entered this historic duel. According to Livy, there was a general consensus that the Horatii belonged to Rome and the Curiatii to Alba Longa, though this remained a contested point in the ancient sources. Dionysius of Halicarnassus, in books III.13–22, treats the duel in considerably greater detail, presenting an account of the families' civic allegiance that is independent of Livy's, and additionally recording the political negotiations that formed the background to the contest. After a long and bloody struggle, two of the Roman brothers fell; all three Alban brothers survived, though variously wounded. The sole remaining Roman, Publius Horatius, exploited his opponents' serious wounds by drawing them apart and killing them one by one, thereby winning victory for Rome. Alba Longa was thus compelled to acknowledge Roman sovereignty.

=== Horatius's killing of his sister and the subsequent trial ===
Returning triumphant, Publius Horatius entered Rome carrying the arms and armour of the Curiatii as spoils of war. Waiting at the city gate was his sister Horatia, who caught sight of a military cloak belonging to one of the Curiatii — her fiancé — draped over her brother's shoulders, and broke into lamentation, crying out her betrothed's name. At this sight Horatius drew his sword in fury and killed her on the spot: Let any Roman woman who mourns Rome's enemy die thus!

Horatius was arrested and charged with parricidium (the killing of a close relative). Tullus appointed two special judges, the duumviri, to conduct the trial; they convicted Horatius and sentenced him to death. Horatius, however, on Tullus's advice exercised his right of provocatio (appeal) to the popular assembly, bringing the case before the people. Horatius's aged father rose before the assembly to argue both that his daughter had deserved her fate and that a father who had already lost two sons in the service of the state should not be deprived of his third. The people voted to acquit, swayed by admiration for the son's courage — a decision that Livy specifically notes was motivated by heroism rather than justice. Valerius Maximus likewise records this trial as an early example of the right of provocatio, viewing Tullus's conduct as a gesture of political compromise.

Following the acquittal, religious purification was required. The father was ordered to offer various expiatory sacrifices at public expense, a ceremony that subsequently became a permanent annual ritual of the Horatian family. In addition, young Horatius was required to pass beneath a beam extended across the street — a symbolic act of submission performed with covered head. This beam was named the tigillum sororium (Sister's Beam), and Livy records that it was maintained at public expense and still stood in his own day.

Two significant historical consequences are attributed to this trial: it is considered the earliest example of provocatio, the right of every condemned Roman citizen to appeal to the people; and the modern observation that the tigillum sororium ritual may have been invented to provide a mythological origin for an existing legal and religious practice. According to the Encyclopædia Britannica, the legend was in all probability fabricated to legitimise prevailing legal and religious customs.

=== The treachery and punishment of Mettius Fufetius ===
After Alba Longa's defeat, Mettius Fufetius was compelled to remain in alliance with Rome. Before long, however, Tullus went to war against the Etruscan city of Veii and its ally Fidenae. Tullus requested that Mettius bring his Alban forces to fight alongside Rome. Mettius agreed, but simultaneously concluded secret arrangements with both the Etruscans and the Romans, planning to switch sides at the height of battle. During the engagement, Mettius kept the Alban troops stationary on a hilltop, joining neither Rome nor the Etruscans, and thereby betraying both sides. Rome's earliest epic poet, Ennius, included the punishment of Mettius Fufetius and the destruction of Alba Longa in his Annales, demonstrating that these events had lodged themselves in Roman collective memory long before Livy.

Tullus won the battle despite the betrayal. After the victory he took Mettius prisoner and punished him by an exceptionally severe and unprecedented method: Mettius was bound between two chariots driven in opposite directions and torn apart. Livy specifically notes that this was the first and only time Romans employed this method of execution.

=== Destruction of Alba Longa, resettlement of the Albans, and the Gens Iulia ===
Following the execution of Mettius, Tullus decreed the complete destruction of Alba Longa. The city's entire population was forcibly relocated to Rome and received as Roman citizens. The leading families of Alba Longa were incorporated into the Roman Senate. According to Livy at I.30, among these families were the Julii, Servilii, Quinctii, Geganii, Curiatii, and Cloelii. Of these families, the Julii — the Gens Iulia — later became the most powerful dynasty in Roman history, producing both Julius Caesar and, subsequently, Augustus. Caesar himself drew on these Alban roots to claim divine descent for his family through Venus. Tullus's Alba Longa policy thus indirectly shaped the entire subsequent course of Roman imperial history.

This demographic integration substantially increased the size of the Senate, necessitating the construction of a larger senate building. The Caelian Hill was assigned as the settlement area for the Albans. Historians regard the destruction of Alba Longa as the event among those attributed to Tullus's reign that comes closest to historical reality, noting that this policy of growth through incorporation is precisely consistent with the documented pattern of Rome's early expansion.

== Other wars ==
=== Campaigns against Fidenae and Veii ===
Ancient Roman sources record that in addition to his conflict with Alba Longa, Tullus conducted successful campaigns against the cities of Fidenae and Veii. These cities were settlements in the Etruscan sphere of influence to the north-west of Rome and were among the perennial opponents of early Rome. Tullus's successes in these campaigns extended Roman dominance far beyond the city walls and resulted in Rome's territorial boundaries spreading across a wider geography for the first time. Orosius directly describes Tullus in this context as the founder of the Roman army. Florus, at I.1.3 of his Epitome Rerum Romanarum, likewise characterises Tullus as the founder of all military discipline and the art of war, concisely recounting the Horatii–Curiatii duel, the punishment of Mettius, and the destruction of Alba Longa. It is also recorded in ancient sources that during the most gruelling moments of these campaigns, when pressed hard by enemy forces, Tullus vowed temples to the gods Pallor (Paleness) and Pavor (Panic).

=== War with the Sabines ===
Ancient sources record that a war against the Sabines also took place during Tullus's reign. According to Dionysius of Halicarnassus, the Roman army, reinforced by Alban infantry and cavalry, inflicted a crushing defeat on the Sabines at the Battle of the Malitiosa. This victory demonstrates that during Tullus's reign Rome was also securing its borders to the east. The Macedonian strategist Polyaenus, at VIII.5.1 of his Stratagems, records a military tactic belonging to the period of Tullus — showing that information about Tullus appears not only in Roman historical literature but also in Greek military writing.

== Institutional and architectural legacy ==
=== Curia Hostilia ===
One of the most significant structures attributed to the reign of Tullus Hostilius is the Curia Hostilia, the first Roman senate building. With the admission of leading Alban families into the Senate, the existing facilities became inadequate and the construction of a new senate building became unavoidable. The new building was erected on the north-western corner of the Forum and named after its founder, Tullus Hostilius.

The remains of the Curia Hostilia are archaeologically dated to around 600 BC. The historian Tim Cornell, however, proposed a more plausible chronology that compresses the traditional 240-year reckoning of the regal period to approximately 120 years; within this framework the discrepancy between Tullus's reign and the construction of the Curia largely disappears.

=== Comitium ===
The Comitium, the open space for popular assemblies built immediately in front of the Curia Hostilia, is also attributed to Tullus. The earliest known floor layer of the Comitium dates to the end of the 7th century BC, and the architectural ornaments found there point to the presence of a significant building in the vicinity.

=== The Fetial college ===
The establishment of the Fetial college — the priestly body responsible for conducting all of Rome's international treaties — is considered to have taken place during the reign of Tullus Hostilius. This body of priest-diplomats constituted a specialised institution that regulated Rome's foreign relations within a religious framework; critical processes such as declarations of war and peace negotiations were conducted through this college. Cicero states explicitly, at De Re Publica II.31, that Tullus was the first king to codify the rules for declaring war (ius fetiale) and to bind them with religious sanction through the Fetials. At De Re Publica III.47 Cicero names Tullus alongside Romulus and Numa as an exemplar of ideal rulers, and at Tusculanae Disputationes I.38 briefly mentions Tullus within the chronological framework of the period. Moreover, Livy at I.24 records that Tullus applied the Fetial ritual directly when declaring war on Alba Longa, which shows that the institution was connected to a concrete historical event rather than remaining an abstract narrative.

=== Foundation of the Salii Collini ===
The only noteworthy institutional achievement attributed to Tullus in the religious sphere is the foundation of the second college of the Salii priesthood, the Salii Collini (also known as the Salii Agonales or Agonenses), as fulfilment of a vow made during the war against Fidenae and Veii. In contrast to Numa Pompilius's Salii Palatini, dedicated to Mars, the new college founded by Tullus was dedicated to Quirinus and was stationed on the Quirinal Hill. Composed of twelve members drawn from the patricians, the institution survived for centuries. Both Salii colleges occupied a decisive place in Rome's annual calendar through the rituals marking the opening and closing of the campaigning season.

The French mythographer Georges Dumézil interpreted the structural opposition between the two colleges — Mars (war) and Quirinus (civic peace) — as a religious framework symbolising Rome's transition between its warlike and civilian identities, evaluating the Salii Palatini as representative of Numa (the function of sovereignty and religion) and the Salii Collini as representative of Tullus (the warrior function) within the Indo-European tripartite ideology reflected in Rome.

== Religious transgression and death ==
=== Neglect of the gods ===
According to Livy's account, throughout his reign Tullus largely neglected his religious duties and obligations to the gods. Perpetually occupied with warfare, Tullus regarded sacrificial ceremonies and religious festivals as unworthy of attention — as things a warrior king could consider unnecessary.

=== Ill omens and pestilence ===
Towards the end of his reign, Rome and its surrounding territory were shaken by a series of inauspicious signs. Reports arrived of a shower of stones on Mons Albanus; in response a nine-day religious festival (novendialis) was proclaimed. Subsequently a mysterious voice was heard from the summit of the mountain, complaining that the Albans had neglected the worship of their ancestral gods. Over and above these omens, a pestilence swept through Rome and Tullus himself fell ill with the disease.

=== Repentance and divine punishment ===
Lying gravely ill, Tullus examined the writings on religious interpretation and ceremonial that his predecessor Numa Pompilius had left behind, and attempted to perform the sacrificial rites recommended therein. He conducted the ceremony prescribed for Jupiter Elicius, however, in an incorrect and incomplete fashion. As a consequence of Jupiter's wrath, Tullus was struck by lightning together with his palace and consumed by fire.

=== Alternative accounts of his death ===
Several different versions of Tullus Hostilius's death exist in the ancient sources. In the first, as Livy recounts, Tullus's house was struck by lightning and burned to the ground, destroying his wife, children, and entire household along with him.

In the second version, Tullus and his family fell victim to a political assassination: according to Dionysius of Halicarnassus, on a stormy and rainy night when the guards had abandoned their posts, Ancus Marcius and his followers concealed swords beneath their cloaks, entered Tullus's house, killed Tullus, the members of his family, and the servants, and burned the property to the ground.

In the third version, Tullus died of the plague. Dionysius records that Tullus died after a reign of thirty-two years. Valerius Maximus also records the lightning-death account and evaluates it as divine retribution for Tullus's neglect of the gods. Sextus Aurelius Victor, in chapter four of his De Viris Illustribus — the chapter devoted to Tullus Hostilius — summarises these versions. According to the fragment of Cassius Dio's lost Book II preserved through Zonaras (7.6), Tullus died either by lightning or as a result of a conspiracy by Ancus Marcius; Appian in the fragments of his Basilike (The Kings) briefly refers to Tullus only as the third king to have died by lightning. For a comparative analysis of these accounts, see Penella (1990).

== Historicity and critical assessment ==
=== Place in modern historiography ===
The events attributed to Tullus Hostilius are, like the accounts of all the early kings of Rome, treated with considerable scepticism by modern historians. All the primary sources — Livy, Dionysius of Halicarnassus, and Plutarch — were composed at least five hundred years after the events they purport to describe took place in the 7th century BC; this greatly increases the risks of anachronism, the historicisation of legend, and patriotically motivated fiction.

The most concrete basis for this scepticism is the near-perfect structural correspondence between the narrative of Tullus and that of Romulus. Both were raised in pastoral surroundings, waged war against Fidenae and Veii, doubled the citizen population, reorganised the army, and departed this world with a thunderbolt. Just as both Tarquinius Priscus and Tarquinius Superbus are credited with identical accomplishments, this structural similarity suggests that the early Roman annalists produced what amounts to a literary doublet. Tullus's warlike and wrathful character may be nothing more than a contrasting stereotype to the peaceful, pious Numa Pompilius; the first Roman historians may simply have attributed aggressive qualities to Hostilius by naively deriving them from the gentile name Hostilius, which resembles the Latin word hostilis, "hostile".

=== Evidence for historicity ===
The majority of historians nonetheless accept that Tullus Hostilius was a historical figure in the strict sense. The most compelling evidence lies in the name itself: "Tullus" is an exceptionally rare praenomen in Roman culture, and the name "Hostilius" did not belong to any of the great noble families of Republican Rome, making it unlikely that the name was invented after the fact. Tullus's policy of incorporating Alban leaders into the Senate and bringing the city into the Roman state is entirely consistent with the documented pattern of growth through incorporation that characterises Rome's early expansion, and this consistency suggests the narrative has a historical core.

=== Georges Dumézil's tripartite hypothesis ===
The French comparative mythographer Georges Dumézil interpreted the early kings of Rome within the framework of the Indo-European tripartite ideology (idéologie tripartite): the function of sovereignty/religion, the warrior function, and the function of production/fertility. In this scheme, Numa Pompilius represents the religious sovereignty function and Tullus Hostilius the warrior function. Dumézil further evaluated the structural opposition between Numa's Salii Palatini and Tullus's Salii Collini — the former dedicated to Mars, the latter to Quirinus — as concrete evidence of the religious framework symbolising Rome's transition between war and civil peace.

=== Dominique Briquel and the Indo-European legendary pattern ===
The French scholar Dominique Briquel has argued that in his narrative Livy was historicising an ancient Indo-European legendary pattern, whereby a single violent figure is followed by a single peacemaker. Among the mythological counterparts of this pattern are the pairings of Jupiter and Mars, Odin and Týr, and Indra and Mitra.

=== The three tribes and the connection to the Luceres ===
In the context of the symbolic completion of Rome's traditional four elements, Romulus is held to represent the Ramnes tribe and Numa Pompilius the Tities tribe. To complete the scheme, the role of founder of the Luceres tribe was assigned to Tullus, while Ancus Marcius was added to the list as founder of the common people (the plebs).

=== The alternative chronology debate ===
The traditional Roman regal chronology spans approximately 240 years for seven kings, corresponding to an average reign of around 34 years per king. Tim Cornell argued that the regal period should be compressed to approximately 120 years. Archaeological findings confirm that the first signs of Rome's urbanisation appear around 625 BC, and that the regal period ended around 500 BC. The ancient sources themselves diverge on this point: Dionysius of Halicarnassus gives 32 years, Eusebius in his Chronicon gives 33 years, and Festus in his De Verborum Significatu gives 44 years. This divergence shows that the chronology debate is not confined to modern historians but was already present within the ancient tradition itself.

== Parallels with Romulus ==
Ancient sources and modern scholars alike have drawn attention to the striking parallels between Tullus Hostilius and Romulus:

- Both were raised in pastoral surroundings.
- Both waged war against Fidenae and Veii.
- Both doubled Rome's population.
- Both reorganised the army.
- Both departed this world by a thunderbolt.

These parallels have led some historians to conclude that the narrative of Tullus is largely a literary construct borrowed from the life of Romulus.

== Cultural legacy ==
=== In Virgil's Aeneid ===
Tullus Hostilius is mentioned at two separate points in Virgil's epic Aeneid. In the first, Anchises, as he names the great leaders of Rome, praises Tullus as a man who would rouse men grown idle and inglorious to great achievement. In the second, on Aeneas's shield, the scene is depicted of Tullus dragging the body of the treacherous Mettius through the thickets. The 4th-century AD grammarian Servius, in his commentary on the Aeneid (I.7), briefly notes that Tullus destroyed Alba Longa and transferred all its noble families to Rome, offering this information as a historical annotation to Virgil's text.

=== Pierre Corneille's tragedy Horace and Jacques-Louis David's painting ===
The French poet and playwright Pierre Corneille wrote the tragedy Horace (1640), based on the Horatii–Curiatii conflict. Corneille's version dramatically reinterprets Livy's narrative and foregrounds the clash between individual honour and loyalty to the state; Tullus Hostilius himself appears as a character in the play. Jacques-Louis David's celebrated painting Oath of the Horatii (Le Serment des Horaces, 1784, Louvre) was also inspired by the same legend, though the oath scene depicted in the painting does not appear in Livy's text.

=== In the Baroque operatic tradition ===
The legends surrounding the reign of Tullus Hostilius provided the subject matter for opera librettos during the Baroque period in music. The earliest example of this tradition is the opera Tullo Ostilio, with music by Giovanni Bononcini, performed in Rome in 1694. Subsequently, operatic pastiches incorporating music by Antonio Vivaldi were staged in Prague in 1727 and in Brno in 1735. In keeping with the conventions of the period, these works concentrated on invented love stories woven around the principal historical events.

=== In film and literature ===
Tullus Hostilius was portrayed by Robert Keith in the 1961 film Duel of Champions (Orazi e Curiazi), centred on the Horatii and Curiatii conflict.

Tullus Hostilius appears as a minor character in Philip José Farmer's novel To Your Scattered Bodies Go (1971), the first book in the Riverworld series. In the post-Resurrection society depicted in the novel, he has teamed up with Hermann Göring to run a slave state.

== Primary sources ==
- Ennius, Quintus. Annales, fr. 116, 139, 143 (Skutsch). [c. 239–169 BC; the punishment of Mettius Fufetius and the destruction of Alba Longa]
- Cicero. De Re Publica, II.17, II.31, and III.47; Tusculanae Disputationes, I.38. [The Fetial college; Tullus as an exemplar of ideal rule]
- Virgil. Aeneid, Books VI and VIII. [19 BC; the praise of Tullus and the Mettius scene]
- Florus, Lucius Annaeus. Epitome Rerum Romanarum, I.1.3–8. [Characterises Tullus as "the founder of military discipline"; the Horatii, Mettius, and Alba Longa]
- Livy, Titus. Ab Urbe Condita (From the Founding of the City), Book I, chapters 12, 22–31. [Chapter I.24 contains in particular the first application of the Fetial ritual]
- Dionysius of Halicarnassus. Antiquitates Romanae (Roman Antiquities), Book III, chapters 1–35. [Chapters III.13–22 give an account of the Horatii–Curiatii duel independent of and more detailed than Livy's]
- Pliny the Elder. Naturalis Historia, II.53. [Death by lightning; Tullus's error in the Jupiter Elicius ritual]
- Plutarch. Bioi Paralleloi (Parallel Lives): Life of Numa, chapters 21–22.
- Plutarch. Bioi Paralleloi: Life of Romulus, chapter 14.
- Tacitus. Annales, XI.24.
- Valerius Maximus. Facta et Dicta Memorabilia, III.4.1–2; VII.4.1; VIII.1.1; IX.12.1.
- Polyaenus. Stratagems, VIII.5.1. [A military tactic from the period of Tullus]
- Seneca. De Clementia, I.7.1. [The death of Tullus by lightning]
- Appian. Basilike (The Kings), fr. 5b–5d. [Criticism of Horatius; Tullus's death by lightning]
- Cassius Dio. Historia Romana, Book II, fr. (via Zonaras 7.6). [Accounts of Tullus's death; foundation of the Salii Collini]
- Servius. Commentarius in Vergilii Aeneidem, I.7. [4th century AD; the destruction of Alba Longa and the transfer of families to Rome]
- Eutropius. Breviarium ab Urbe Condita, I.4.
- Aurelius Victor, Sextus. De Viris Illustribus, 4. [The chapter devoted to Tullus Hostilius]
- Orosius, Paulus. Historiarum Adversum Paganos, II.4. [Describes Tullus as the founder of the army; the temples of Pallor and Pavor]
- Festus, Sextus Pompeius. De Verborum Significatu, relevant entries. [Reign length: 44 years]
- Eusebius. Chronicon, relevant section. [Reign length: 33 years]

== Secondary sources ==
- Cornell, T. J. (1995). The Beginnings of Rome: Italy and Rome from the Bronze Age to the Punic Wars (c. 1000–264 BC). London and New York: Routledge.
- Forsythe, Gary (2005). A Critical History of Early Rome: From Prehistory to the First Punic War. Berkeley: University of California Press.
- Ogilvie, R. M. (1965). A Commentary on Livy, Books 1–5. Oxford: Clarendon Press.
- Dumézil, Georges (1970). Archaic Roman Religion. Chicago: University of Chicago Press.
- Neel, Jaclyn (2015). "Alba Longa". The Encyclopedia of Ancient History. John Wiley & Sons, pp. 1–2.
- Penella, Robert J. (1990). "Vires/Robur/Opes and Ferocia in Livy's Account of Romulus and Tullus Hostilius". The Classical Quarterly, 40 (1): 207–213.
- Briquel, Dominique (2014). "Livy and Indo-European Comparatism". A Companion to Livy. Wiley, pp. 153–166.
- Schwegler, Albert. Römische Geschichte. Relevant sections.
- Smith, William (1875). Dictionary of Greek and Roman Antiquities, s.v. "Salii". London: John Murray.
- Smith, William (1870). Dictionary of Greek and Roman Biography and Mythology. London: Taylor, Walton and Maberly.
- Encyclopædia Britannica. "Tullus Hostilius" and "Horatii and Curiatii" articles. 1911 edition.

Tullus Hostilius Kings of Rome
Preceded by Numa Pompilius	King of Rome c. 672 BC – 640 BC	Succeeded by Ancus Marcius
