= Medullia =

Ancient town in Latium

Medullia was a town in ancient Latium, Italy.

In Rome's early semi-legendary history, Medullia was one of a number of cities of the Latins who went to war with ancient Rome in the 7th century BC, during the reign of the Roman King Ancus Marcius. The town was the focus of the main part of the war when it was besieged by the Roman army. According to Livy it had a strong garrison and was strongly fortified. The Romans were eventually victorious in the war in a pitched battle outside the town.

Livy also records the town was part of the Latin League which went to war with Rome during the reign of Rome's king Lucius Tarquinius Priscus. Medullia was one of a number of towns captured by Tarquinius Priscus.
