= Tullus (comics) =

American religious comic book feature by Joseph Hughes Newton

Tullus was an American comic book feature published in biblical comic books from 1943 until 1976. It was created by Joseph Hughes Newton and is set in the 1st century AD.

== Publication history ==
Tullus was first published on December 26, 1943, in the Sunday School papers What to Do, Boys' World and Girls' Companion (who were later merged into the Christian comic paper Sunday Pix). The strip was also carried by Cook's Young People's Weekly. Its original creator was Joseph Hughes Newton. The strip was later written and scripted by other artists like Brinton Turkle, Bob Magnusen and written, pencilled and inked by Al Stenzel and Irv Novick, a veteran DC artist notable for his war comics.

== Concept ==
Tullus takes place in the 1st century AD and follows the adventures of Tullus, a young Christian Roman who travels to many places in the ancient world, including Asia Minor, Greece, and Rome.

== Albums ==
Six collections of the Tullus comics have appeared in paperback book form, the first of these made in the 1970s by Sunday Pix publisher David C. Cook.:

- Tullus and the Monsters of the Deep
- Tullus and the Dark City
- Tullus and the Ransom Gold
- Tullus and the Vandals of the North
- Tullus in the Deadly Whirlpool
- Tullus and the Kidnapped Prince

These collections reprint later Tullus stories, which are not as prized by collectors as the earlier stories.

== Reprint ==
In 2016, a Tullus comic book was published by Manuscript Press in both print and Kindle editions. It is a color reprint of all of the Tullus pages from the year 1952, with a cover by Danny Frolich.
