= Numa Marcius =

Numa Marcius, son of Marcus, was the first Pontifex Maximus of Ancient Rome.

He was appointed by the King Numa Pompilius who assigned to him the entire system of religious rites, which system was written out for him and sealed and included the manner and timing of sacrifices, the supervision of religious funds, authority over all public and private religious institutions, instruction of the populace in the celestial and funerary rites including appeasing the dead, and expiation of prodigies.

== Family ==
He had a son also named Numa Marcius, who served as praefectus urbi under Tullus Hostilius. The younger Marcius married Pompilia, daughter of Numa Pompilius, and was the father of Ancus Marcius.
