= Numa Pompilius =

King of Rome from 715 to 672 BC

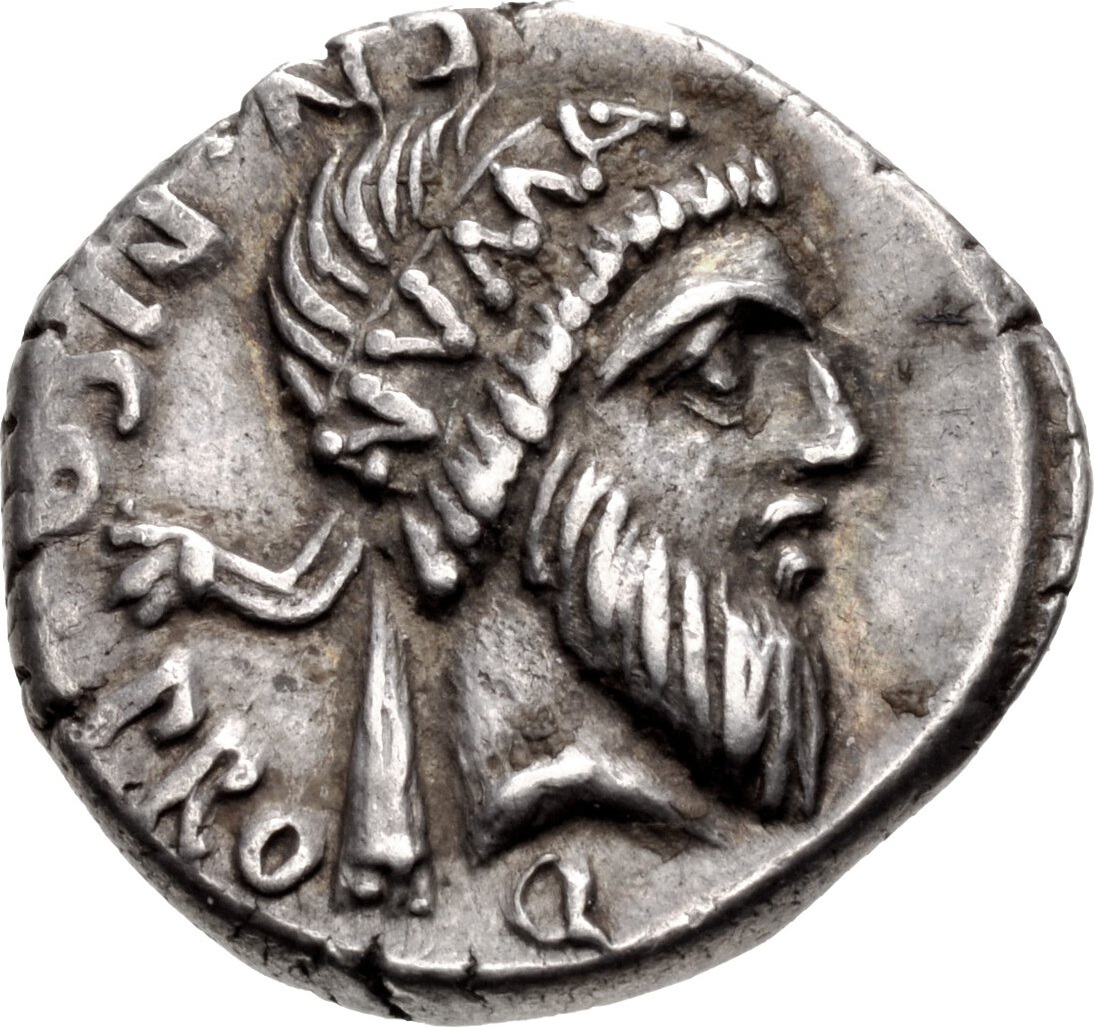
- Numa depicted on a 48 BC denarius

King of Rome
- Reign: 715–672 BC
- Predecessor: Romulus
- Successor: Tullus Hostilius
- Spouse: Tatia
- Issue: Pompillia
- Father: Pomponius

Numa Pompilius (Classical Latin: [ˈnʊma pɔmˈpɪliʊs]; c. 753–672 BC; reigned 715–672 BC) was the legendary second king of Rome, succeeding Romulus after a one-year interregnum. He was of Sabine origin, and many of Rome's most important religious and political institutions are attributed to him, such as the Roman calendar, Vestal Virgins, the cult of Mars, the cult of Jupiter, the cult of Romulus, and the office of pontifex maximus.

== Genealogy ==
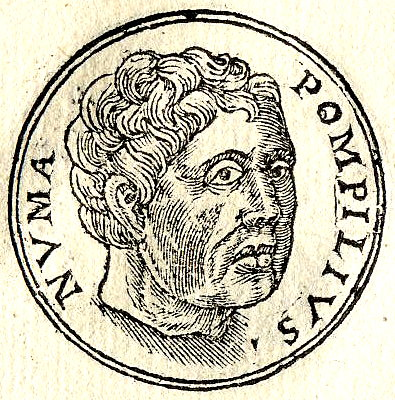
Fantasy depiction of Numa in the Promptuarii Iconum Insigniorum

According to Plutarch, Numa was the youngest of Pomponius's four sons, born on the day of Rome's founding (traditionally, 21 April 753 BC). He lived a severe life of discipline and banished all luxury from his home. Titus Tatius, king of the Sabines and a colleague of Romulus, gave in marriage his only daughter, Tatia, to Numa. After 13 years of marriage, Tatia died, precipitating Numa's retirement to the countryside. According to Livy, Numa resided at Cures immediately before being elected king.

Livy and Plutarch refer to the story that Numa was instructed in philosophy by Pythagoras, but discredit it as chronologically and geographically implausible.

Plutarch reports that some authors credited Pompilius with only a single daughter, Pompilia. Pompilia's mother is variously identified as Numa's first wife Tatia, or his second wife Lucretia. Pompilia is said to have married the son of the first pontifex maximus, Numa Marcius, also named Numa Marcius, and by him gave birth to the future king Ancus Marcius.

Other authors, according to Plutarch, additionally gave Numa five sons, Pompo (or Pomponius), Pinus, Calpus, Mamercus, and Numa, from whom the noble families (gentes) of the Pomponii, Pinarii, Calpurnii, Aemilii, and Pompilii respectively traced their descent. Other more skeptical authors, still according to Plutarch, believed these were fictional genealogies to enhance the status of these families.

== Kingship ==
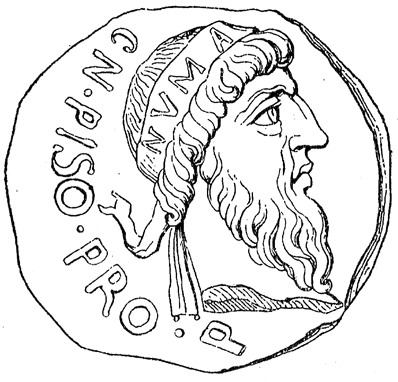
Numa Pompilius shown as an effigy on a Roman coin minted by Gnaeus Calpurnius Piso during the reign of Emperor Augustus. Piso himself claimed descent from the king.

After the death of Romulus, there was an interregnum of one year, in which members of the Senate exercised the royal power in rotation, each for five days in a row. In 715 BC, after much bickering between the factions of Romulus (the Romans) and Tatius (the Sabines), a compromise was reached, and the Senate elected the Sabine Numa, who was approximately forty years of age, as the next king.

At first, Numa refused the offer of kingship. He argued that Rome, under the influence of Romulus's rule, was still a country of war. It needed a ruler who would lead their armies, not someone who lived a life of piety and reflection. However, his father and Sabine kinsmen, including his teacher and the father of Numa's son-in-law, Marcus, along with an embassy of two senators from Rome, together persuaded him to accept. In Plutarch and Livy's account, Numa, after being summoned by the Senate from Cures, was offered the tokens of power amid an enthusiastic reception by the people of Rome. He requested, however, that an augur should divine the opinion of the gods on the prospect of his kingship before he accepted. Jupiter was consulted, and the omens were favourable. Thus approved by the Roman and Sabine people and the heavens, he took up his position as King of Rome.

According to Plutarch, Numa's first act was to disband the personal guard of 300 so-called celeres (the "Swift") with which Romulus permanently surrounded himself. This gesture is variously interpreted as self-protection in the face of their questionable loyalty, a sign of Numa's humility, or a sign of peace and moderation.

Based on Roman chronology, Numa died of old age in 672 BC. After a reign of 43 years, he was about 81 years old. At his request, he was not cremated, but instead buried in a stone coffin on the Janiculum, near the altar of Fons. Tullus Hostilius succeeded him.

Rome had two kings in succession who differed in their methods. According to Livy, Romulus was a king of war while Numa was a king of peace, and thus Rome was well versed in both the arts of war and peace.

== Agent of the gods ==
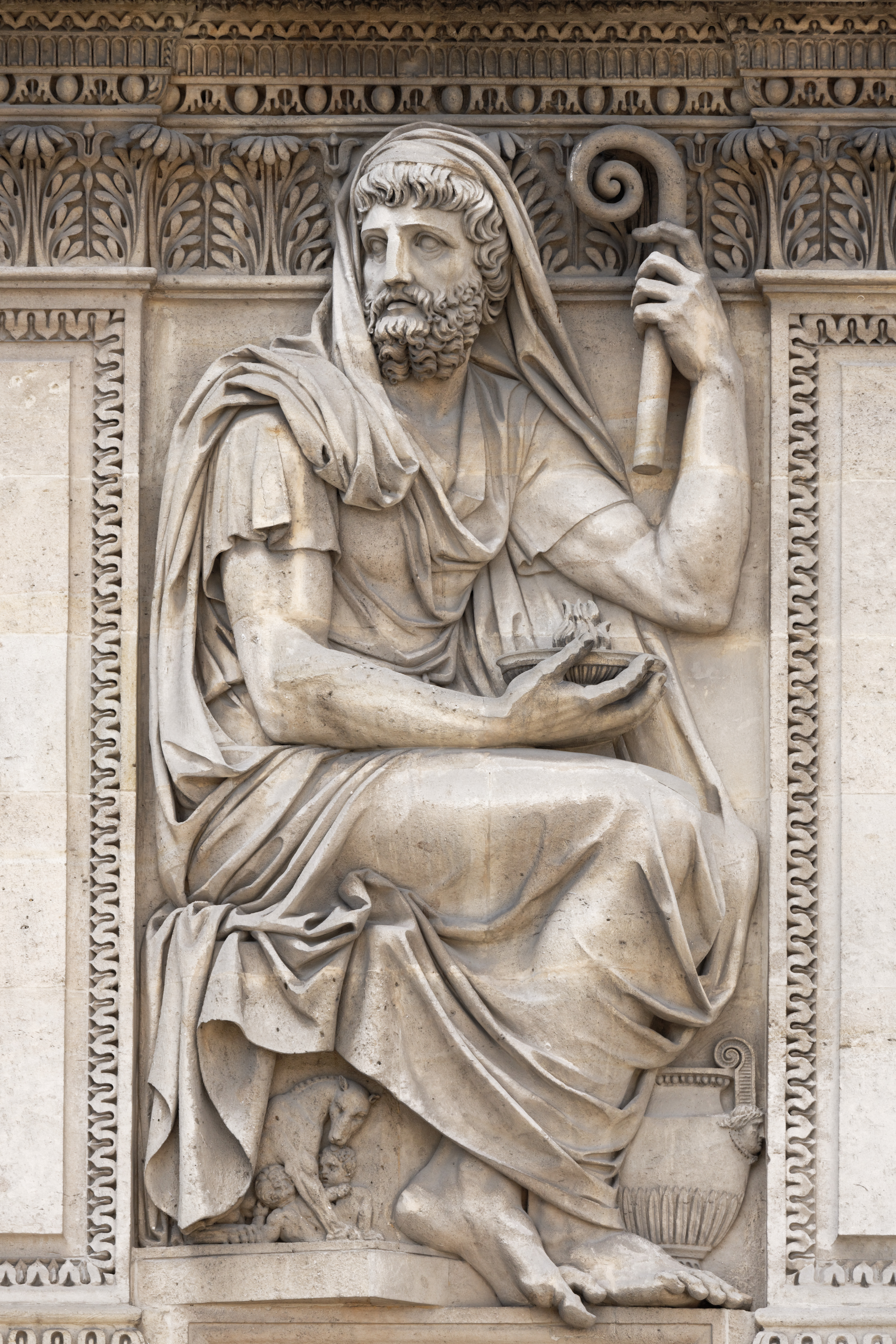
Numa Pompilius at the Louvre, by Jean Guillaume Moitte

Numa was traditionally celebrated by the Romans for his wisdom and piety. In addition to the endorsement by Jupiter, he is supposed to have had a direct and personal relationship with a number of deities, most famously the nymph Egeria, who, according to legend, taught him to be a wise legislator. According to Livy, Numa claimed that he held nightly consultations with Egeria on the proper manner of instituting sacred rites for the city. Numa then appointed the priests for each of the deities. Plutarch suggests that he played on superstition to give himself an aura of awe and divine allure, to cultivate more gentle behaviour among the warlike early Romans: honoring the gods, abiding by law, behaving humanely to enemies, and living proper, respectable lives.

Numa was said to have authored several "sacred books" in which he had written down divine teachings, mostly from Egeria and the Muses. Plutarch (citing Valerius Antias) and Livy record that at his request he was buried along with these "sacred books", preferring that the rules and rituals they prescribed be preserved in the living memory of the state priests, rather than preserved as relics subject to forgetfulness and disuse. About half of these books—Plutarch and Livy differ on their number—were thought to cover the priesthoods he had established or developed, including the flamines, pontifices, Salii, and fetiales and their rituals. The other books dealt with philosophy (disciplina sapientiae). According to Plutarch, these books were recovered some four hundred years later (in reality almost five hundred years, i.e. in 181 BC according to Livy 40:29:3-14) at the occasion of a natural accident that exposed the tomb. They were examined by the Senate, deemed to be inappropriate for disclosure to the people, and burned. Dionysius of Halicarnassus hints that they were actually kept as a very close secret by the pontifices.

Numa is reputed to have constrained the two minor gods Picus and Faunus into delivering some prophecies of things to come.

Numa, supported and prepared by Egeria, reportedly held a battle of wits with Jupiter himself, through an apparition whereby Numa sought to gain a protective ritual against lightning strikes and thunder.

Once, when a plague was ravaging the population, a brass shield fell from the sky and was brought to Numa. He declared that Egeria had told him it was a gift from Jupiter, to be used for Rome's protection. He ordered ceremonies to give thanks for the gift, and quickly brought about an end to the plague. The Ancile became a sacred relic of the Romans and was placed in the care of the Salii.

== Rules and institutions attributed to Numa ==
Many actions and institutions are attributed to Numa. In some of them, Plutarch thought he detected a Laconian influence, attributing the connection to the Sabine culture of Numa, for "Numa was descended of the Sabines, who declare themselves to be a colony of the Lacedaemonians."

=== Religious ===
One of Numa's first acts was the construction of a temple of Janus as an indicator of peace and war. The temple was constructed at the foot of the Argiletum, a road in the city. After securing peace with Rome's neighbours, the doors of the temples were shut and remained so for the duration of Numa's reign, a unique case in Roman history.

Another creation attributed to Numa was the cult of Terminus, a god of boundaries. Through this rite, which involved sacrifices at private properties, boundaries and landmarks, Numa reportedly sought to instill in Romans the respect of lawful property and non-violent relationships with neighbours. The cult of Terminus, preached Numa, involved absence of violence and murder. The god was a testament to justice and a keeper of peace. Numa sought to associate himself with one of the roles of Vegoia in the religious system of the neighbouring Etruscans, by deciding to set the official boundaries of the territory of Rome, which Romulus had never wanted, presumably with the same concern of preserving peace.

Recognizing the paramount importance of the Ancile, King Numa had eleven matching shields made, so perfect that no one, even Numa, could distinguish the original from the copies. These shields were the Ancilia, the sacred shields of Jupiter, which were carried each year in a procession by the Salii priests. Numa also established the office and duties of Pontifex Maximus and instituted (Plutarch's version) the flamen of Quirinus, in honour of Romulus, in addition to those of Jupiter and Mars that already existed. Numa also brought the Vestal Virgins to Rome from Alba Longa. Plutarch adds that they were then at the number of two, were later augmented to four by Servius Tullius, and stayed thus through the ages.

Livy and Dionysius give a largely concordant picture of the vast founding work carried out by Numa concerning Roman religion and religious institutions.

Livy begins with the priesthoods which Numa established. Numa created a residentiary flamen to Jupiter endowed with regal insignia, who could carry out the sacred functions of the royal office, which Numa usually discharged: Numa did so to avoid the neglect of the rites whenever the king went to war, for he saw the warlike attitude of the Romans. He also created the flamines of Mars and Quirinus, as well as the Vestal virgins and the twelfth Salii of Mars Gradivus. Then, he chose Numa Marcius as pontiff. To him, he bestowed all the sacred ceremonies, his books and seals. The following words of this passage have been considered a systematic summary exposition of Roman religion:

quibus hostiis, quibus diebus, ad quae templa sacra fierent atque unde in eos sumptus pecunia erogaretur. Cetera quoque omnia publica privataque sacra pontificis scitis subiecit, ut esset quo consultum plebes veniret, ne quid divini iuris negligendo patrios ritus peregrinosque adsciscendo turbaretur. Nec celestes modo caerimonias sed iusta quoque funebria placandosque manes ut idem pontificem edoceret, quaeque prodigia fulminibus a Iove quo visu missa susciperentur atque curarentur.

[translated]
...[showing] with what victims, upon what days, and at what temples the sacred rites were to be performed, and from what funds the money was to be taken to defray the expenses. He also placed all other religious institutions, public and private, under the control of the decrees of the pontiff, to the end that there might be some authority to whom the people should come to ask advice, to prevent any confusion in the divine worship being caused by their neglecting the ceremonies of their own country, and adopting foreign ones. He further ordained that the same pontiff should instruct the people not only in the ceremonies connected with the heavenly deities, but also in the due performance of funeral solemnities, and how to appease the shades of the dead; and what prodigies sent by lightning or any other phenomenon were to be attended to and expiated.

Livy lists the hostiae, victims, as the first competence of the pontiffs: following this come the days, temples, money, other sacred ceremonies, funerals and prodigies.

Livy continues saying Numa dedicated an altar to Jupiter Elicius as the source of religious knowledge, and consulted the god by means of auguries as to what should be expiated; he instituted a yearly festival to Fides (Faith) and commanded the three major flamines to be carried to her temple in an arched chariot and to perform the service with their hands wrapped up to the fingers, meaning Faith had to be sacred as in men's right hand; among many other rites he instituted he dedicated places of the Argei.

Dionysius of Halicarnassus devotes much more space to Numa's religious reforms. In his account the institution of eight priesthoods is attributed to Numa: curiones, flamines, celeres, augurs, vestals, salii, fetials and pontiffs. He says only a few words about the curiones, who were in charge of tending the sacrifices of the curiae; the flamines; the tribuni celerum, who were the bodyguard of the king but who also took part in some religious ceremonies; and the augurs, who were in charge of official divination.

Plutarch records some of these, such as sacrificing an uneven number of victims to the heavenly gods and an even number to the nether gods; the prohibition of making libations to the gods with wine made from the grapes of unpruned vines; the prohibition of sacrificing without flour; the necessity of making a complete turn on oneself while praying and worshiping the gods.

The ritual of the spolia opima is ascribed to Numa, too, by ancient sources.

Finally, Arnobius states the indigitamenta were attributed to him.

Numa mostly preferred bloodless and not costly sacrifices.

Plutarch, in like manner, tells of the early religion of the Romans, that it was imageless and spiritual. He says Numa "forbade the Romans to represent the deity in the form either of man or of beast. Nor was there among them formerly any image or statue of the Divine Being; during the first one hundred and seventy years they built temples, indeed, and other sacred domes, but placed in them no figure of any kind; persuaded that it is impious to represent things Divine by what is perishable, and that we can have no conception of God but by the understanding".

=== Calendar ===
By tradition, Numa promulgated a calendar reform, which divided the year into twelve months according to the lunar course, but adjusted to be in accordance with the solstitial revolution. It was during this time that the months of January and February were introduced. Numa also made the distinction of the days being either profane or sacred.

In his Parallel Lives, Plutarch mentions that Numa Pompilius made January the first month in the calendar instead of March by the next reason: "he wished in every case that martial influences should yield precedence to civil and political. For this Janus, in remote antiquity, whether he was a demi-god or a king, was a patron of civil and social order, and is said to have lifted human life out of its bestial and savage state. For this reason he is represented with two faces, implying that he brought men's lives out of one sort and condition into another."

=== Social ===
==== Guilds ====
Numa established the traditional collegia (occupational guilds) of Rome:

So, distinguishing the whole people by the several arts and trades, he formed the companies of musicians, goldsmiths, carpenters, dyers, shoemakers, skinners, braziers, and potters; and all other handicraftsmen he composed and reduced into a single company, appointing every one their proper courts, councils, and observances. (Plutarch)

William Blackstone says that Numa may be credited with "originally inventing" corporations: "They were introduced, as Plutarch says, by Numa; who finding, upon his accession, the city torn to pieces by the two rival factions of Sabines, and Romans, thought it a prudent and politic measure, to subdivide these two into many smaller ones, by instituting separate societies of every manual trade and profession."

==== Agriculture ====
Numa was credited with dividing the immediate territory of Rome into pagi (villages). According to Plutarch, he divided the existing land among indigent people in Rome, and persuaded them to work in agriculture, thinking it would reduce aggressivity, and eliminate poverty and consequently crime. He considered agriculture as an occupation "fostering character rather than wealth". Plutarch suggests, the forbidding by Numa of making a sacrifice without a meal and from unpruned vines was intended to make people work in agriculture.

Commenting on the effects that Numa’s land reforms had on their beneficiaries, one study has noted that

It was rather hard at first for the new-made farmers to be contented on their farms and to do good work. They were mostly soldiers and had very little knowledge of anything except marching and fighting. But it was not long before they began to understand what a blessing it is to be self-supporting and independent. Their little farms were pleasant homes. They began to love their new life and soon were able to raise enough for the support of themselves and their families, with something to spare.

==== Slavery ====
Numa forbade fathers to sell their sons into slavery if the son had married according to the will of the father.

According to Plutarch, Numa permitted slaves to feast with their masters during the Saturnalia, for "admitting to the enjoyment of the yearly fruits of the earth those who had helped to produce them". Plutarch suggests that the timing could be in remembrance of the mythical Saturnian age, when—according to Roman belief—there was neither slave nor master, but all were regarded as kinsmen and equals.

== Peacemaker ==
Plutarch depicts Numa as a powerful peacemaker. Making the Romans more peaceful was one of his main targets from the beginning of the kingship and many of his actions were directly or indirectly intended to achieve this aim. He succeeded so much that the situation was even better than described in the song:

"And on the iron-bound shield-handles lie the tawneyº spiders' webs"; "rust now subdues the sharp-pointed spears and two-edged swords; no longer is the blast of brazen trumpets heard, nor are the eyelids robbed of delicious sleep."

According to Plutarch, any conflicts were excluded not only from Rome but from all Italy. The roads became safe and feasts and festivals prevailed. Nobody tried to hurt Numa, to take his place. When Numa died, from natural causes, people friendly to Rome come from many places to honour him. Plutarch put this in contrast to the policies and the destiny of his predecessors and successors: Romulus who is depicted as war-king and the 5 kings after him, from which 4 were killed and 1 dethroned and expelled from Rome.

== Story of the books of Numa ==
Livy narrates that, in 181 BC, while digging in the field of the scriba L. Petilius at the foot of the Ianiculum, peasants found two stone coffers, eight feet long and four feet wide, inscribed both in Latin and in Greek characters, one stating that Numa Pompilus, son of Pompon, king of the Romans was buried (there) and the other that Numa's books were inside it. When Petilius after the advice of his friends opened it, the one that was inscribed with the name of the king was found empty, the other containing two bundles each of seven books, not complete but looking very recent, seven in Latin dealing with pontifical law and seven in Greek of philosophy as it was in that remote past.

The books were shown to other people and the fact became public. Praetor Q. Petilius, who was friends with L. Petilius, requested them, found them very dangerous to religion and told Lucius he would have them burnt, but he allowed him to try and recover them by legal or other means. The scriba brought the case to the tribunes of the plebs, and the tribunes in turn brought it to the senate. The praetor declared he was ready to swear an oath that it was not a good thing either to read or to store those books, and the senate deliberated that the offer of the oath was sufficient by itself, that the books be burnt on the Comitium as soon as possible and that an indemnity fixed by the praetor and the tribunes be paid to the owner. L. Petilius though declined to accept the sum. The books were burnt by the victimarii.

The action of the praetor has been seen as politically motivated, and in accord with the Catonian reaction of those years. It is relevant though that some of the annalists of those times or only a few years later, do not seem to show any doubt about the authenticity of the books. The whole incident has been critically analyzed again by philologist E. Peruzzi, who by comparing the different versions, strives to demonstrate the overall authenticity of the books. By contrast, M.J. Pena's position is more reserved and critical.

Francophone scholars A. Delatte and J. Carcopino believe the incident to be the result of a real initiative of the pythagoric sect of Rome. The fears of the Roman authorities should be explained in connection to the nature of the doctrines contained in the books, which are supposed to have contained a type of physikòs lógos, a partly moral and partly cosmological interpretation of religious beliefs that has been proven by Delatte to be proper of the ancient pythagorism. Part of it must have been in contradiction with the beliefs of fulgural and augural art and of the procuratio of the prodigies. Most ancient authors relate the presence of treatises of pythagoric philosophy, but some, as Sempronius Tuditanus, mention only religious decrees.

== Later traditions ==
The Christian philosopher Clement of Alexandria in his book Stromata claimed that King Numa Pompilius was influenced by Mosaic law, and due to this refrained from making human images in sculpture.

Numa Pompilius continued to be remembered well into the later centuries of the Eastern Roman Empire. Composing Novellae Constitutiones, 6th-century Emperor Justinian I recalled Numa alongside Romulus as two of the Roman state's founders, with Numa being the one who first "organised and enhanced [the city of Rome], by means of laws." In a similar manner, the Coptic monophysite bishop John of Nikiû likened Empress Theodora, consort of Justinian, to four prominent figures of Roman history (Romulus, Numa, Caesar, Augustus), citing her reforms aimed at eradicating prostitution. In the 11th century, Michael Psellos wrote his Chronographia with an intent to provide pedagogical models for his student, Emperor Michael VII Doukas, and when reviewing the seven kings of Rome he lauded Numa as pious, peaceable, and "a man not only well worth seeing for his physical appearance but also equipped with all sorts of mental virtues, and a lover of all wisdom."

== See also ==
- Pompilia gens

== Sources ==
=== Primary ===
- Plutarch, Parallel Lives, Life of Numa Pompilius.
- Livy, Ab urbe condita, Liber 1

=== Secondary ===
- Unearthing Rome's king from the History News Network
- Mark Silk (2004). "Numa Pompilius and the Idea of Civil Religion in the West". Journal of the American Academy of Religion. 72 (4): 863–96. doi:10.1093/jaarel/lfh082.
- Numa on the Ara Pacis Augustae

Legendary titles
Preceded by Romulus	King of Rome; 715–673/2 BC	Succeeded by Tullus Hostilius
