= Pontifex maximus =

Chief high priest in ancient Rome

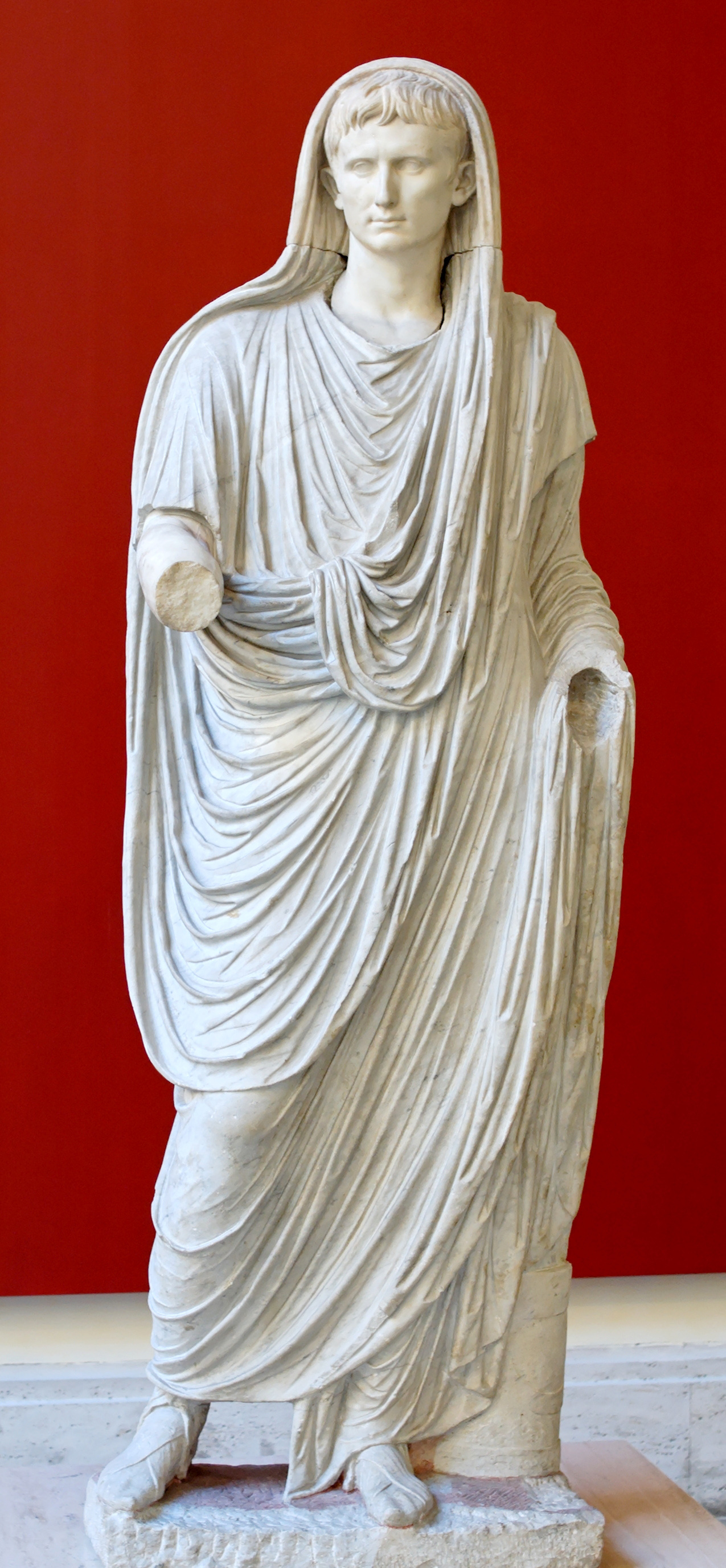
Augustus as pontifex maximus (Via Labicana Augustus)

The pontifex maximus (Latin for 'supreme pontiff') was the chief high priest of the College of Pontiffs (Collegium Pontificum) in ancient Rome. This was the most important position in the ancient Roman religion, open only to patricians until 254 BC, when a plebeian first held this position. Although in fact the most powerful office in the Roman priesthood, the pontifex maximus was officially ranked fifth in the ranking of the highest Roman priests (Ordo Sacerdotum), behind the Rex Sacrorum and the flamines maiores (Flamen Dialis, Flamen Martialis, Flamen Quirinalis).

A distinctly religious office under the early Roman Republic, it gradually became politicized until, beginning with Augustus, it was subsumed into the position of emperor in the Roman imperial period. Subsequent emperors were styled pontifex maximus well into Late Antiquity, including Gratian (r. 367–383), but during Gratian's reign the phrase was replaced in imperial titulature with the Latin phrase: pontifex inclytus ("honourable pontiff"), an example followed by Gratian's junior co-emperor Theodosius the Great and which was used by emperors thereafter including the co-augusti Valentinian III (r. 425–455), Marcian (r. 450–457) and the augustus Anastasius Dicorus (r. 491–518). The first to adopt the inclytus alternative to maximus may have been the rebel augustus Magnus Maximus (r. 383–388).

The word pontifex and its derivative "pontiff" became terms used for Christian bishops, including the Bishop of Rome. The title of pontifex maximus was adopted by the Catholic Church for the pope as its chief bishop and appears on buildings, monuments and coins of popes of Renaissance and modern times. The official list of titles of the pope given in the Annuario Pontificio includes "supreme pontiff" (Latin: summus pontifex) as the fourth title, the first being "bishop of Rome".

== Etymology ==
The etymology of "pontifex" is uncertain, but the word has been used since Roman times. The word appears to consist of the Latin word for "bridge" and the suffix for "maker" (pons + facere)". However, there is a possibility that this definition is a folk etymology for an Etruscan term, since Roman religion was heavily influenced by Etruscan religion, and little is known about the Etruscan language, which is a non-Indo-European and poorly attested language.

According to the common interpretation whereby the term pontifex means "bridge-builder", this could have been originally meant in a literal sense: the position of bridge-builder was indeed an important one in Rome, where the major bridges were over the Tiber, the sacred river (and a deity): only prestigious authorities with sacral functions could be allowed to "disturb" it with mechanical additions. However, it was always understood in its symbolic sense as well: the pontifices were the ones who smoothed the "bridge" between gods and men.

The interpretation of the word pontifex as "bridge-builder" was that of Dionysius of Halicarnassus and Marcus Terentius Varro. Plutarch pointed out that the term existed before there were any bridges in Rome and derived the word from Old Latin pontis [sic] meaning a powerful or absolute master, while others derived it from potis facere in the sense of "able to sacrifice". The last derivation is mentioned also by Varro, who rejected it, but it was the view of pontifex maximus Quintus Scaevola. Others have held that the word was originally pompifex (leader of public processions). The word pons originally meant "way" and pontifex would thus mean "maker of roads and bridges."

Another opinion is that the word is a corruption of a similar-sounding but etymologically unrelated Etruscan word. Yet another hypothesis considers the word as a loan from the Sabine language, in which it would mean a member of a college of five, from Osco-Umbrian ponte, five. This explanation takes into account that the college was established by Sabine king Numa Pompilius and the institution is Italic: the expressions pontis and pomperias found in the Iguvine Tablets may denote a group or division of five or by five. The pontifex would thence be a member of a sacrificial college known as pomperia (Latin quinio).

The Roman title pontifex maximus was rendered in Greek inscriptions and literature of the time as Koine Greek: ἀρχιερεύς, romanized: archiereús, lit. 'Archpriest' or by a more literal translation and order of words as Koine Greek: ἀρχιερεὺς μέγιστος, romanized: archireús mégistos, lit. 'greatest archpriest'. The term ἀρχιερεύς is used in the Greek Septuagint text of the Old Testament and in the New Testament to refer to the High Priest of Israel, including in 2 Maccabees (2 Maccabees 4:7).

The word pontifex, Latin for "pontiff," was used in ancient Rome to designate a member of the College of Pontiffs. In the Latin Vulgate translation of the New Testament, it is sometimes used to designate the Jewish high priest, as in the Gospel of John and Epistle to the Hebrews (John 11:49; Hebrews 5:1). From perhaps as early as the 3rd century, it has been used to denote a Christian bishop. In the Vulgate, the term summus pontifex was originally applied to the High Priest of Israel, as in the Book of Judith (Judith 15:19), whose place, each in his own diocese, the Christian bishops were regarded as holding, based on an interpretation from the 1912 edition of the Catholic encyclopedia of the First Epistle of Clement (I Clement 40).

== Origins in the Regal period ==
The Collegium Pontificum (College of Pontiffs) was the most important priesthood of ancient Rome. The foundation of this sacred college and the office of pontifex maximus is attributed to the second king of Rome, Numa Pompilius. Much of what is known about the Regal period in Roman history is semi-legendary or mythical. The Collegium presumably acted as advisers to the rex (king) in religious matters. The collegium was headed by the pontifex maximus, and all the pontifices held their office for life. But the pontifical records of early Rome were most likely destroyed when the city was sacked by the Gauls in 387 BC, and the earliest accounts of Archaic Rome come from the literature of the Republic, most of it from the 1st century BC and later.

According to the Augustan-era historian Livy, Numa Pompilius, a Sabine, devised Rome's system of religious rites, including the manner and timing of sacrifices, the supervision of religious funds, authority over all public and private religious institutions, instruction of the populace in the celestial and funerary rites including appeasing the dead, and expiation of prodigies. Numa is said to have founded Roman religion after dedicating an altar on the Aventine Hill to Jupiter Elicius and consulting the gods by means of augury. Numa wrote down and sealed these religious instructions, and gave them to the first pontifex maximus, Numa Marcius.

== Roman Republic in Rome ==
In the Roman Republic, the pontifex maximus was the highest office in the state religion of ancient Rome and directed the College of Pontiffs. According to Livy, after the overthrow of the monarchy, the Romans created the priesthood of the rex sacrorum, or "king of sacred rites," to carry out certain religious duties and rituals previously performed by the king. The rex sacrorum was explicitly deprived of military and political power, but the pontifices were permitted to hold both magistracies and military commands.

The official residence of the pontifex maximus was the Domus Publica ("State House") which stood between the House of the Vestal Virgins and the Via Sacra, close to the Regia, in the Roman Forum. His religious duties were carried out from the Regia. Unless the pontifex maximus was also a magistrate, he was not allowed to wear the toga praetexta, i.e. toga with the purple border. In artistic representations, he can be recognized by his holding an iron knife (secespita) or the patera, and the distinctive robes or toga with part of the mantle covering the head (capite velato), in keeping with Roman practice.

In practice, particularly during the late Republic, the office of pontifex maximus was generally held by a member of a politically prominent family. It was a coveted position mainly for the great prestige it conferred on the holder. Julius Caesar became pontifex in 73 BC and pontifex maximus in 63 BC.

The major Republican source on the pontiffs would have been the theological writings of Varro, which survive only in fragments preserved by later authors such as Aulus Gellius and Nonius Marcellus. Other sources are Cicero, Livy, Dionysius of Halicarnassus, Valerius Maximus, Plutarch's Life of Numa Pompilius, Festus's summaries of Verrius Flaccus, and in later writers, including several of the Church Fathers. Some of these sources present an extensive list of everyday prohibitions for the pontifex maximus; it seems difficult to reconcile these lists with evidence that many pontifices maximi were prominent members of society who lived normal lives.

=== Election and number ===
The number of Pontifices, elected by co-optatio (i.e. the remaining members nominate their new colleague) for life, was originally five, including the pontifex maximus. The pontifices, moreover, could only come from the old nobility. In effect, this was only members of the patrician class. However, in 300–299 BC the lex Ogulnia opened the office of pontifex maximus to public election and permitted the plebs (plebeians) to be co-opted as priests, so that part of the exclusivity of the title was lost. But it was only in 254 BC that Tiberius Coruncanius became the first plebeian pontifex maximus.

The lex Ogulnia also increased the number of pontiffs to nine (the pontifex maximus included). In 104 BC the lex Domitia prescribed that the election of all pontiffs would henceforward be voted by the comitia tributa (an assembly of the people divided into voting districts); by the same law only 17 tribes, chosen by lot from the 35 tribes of the city, could vote. The law's promulgator, L[ucius] Domitius Ahenobarbus, was shortly afterwards elected pontifex maximus after the death of the incumbent Metellus Dalmaticus: Something of a personal revenge because, the previous year, he had expected to be co-opted as a pontiff to replace his late father, but the pontifical college had appointed another candidate in his place. The office's next holder, Q[uintus] Mucius Scaevola, was also elected under the same law, though without controversy or opposition since he was a former consul and long-serving pontiff.

This law was abolished in 81 BC by Sulla in his dictatorship, in the lex Cornelia de Sacerdotiis, which restored to the great priestly colleges their full right of co-optatio. Also under Sulla, the number of pontifices was increased to fifteen, the pontifex maximus included, and Sulla appointed Quintus Caecilius Metellus Pius as the next holder of the office – the only truly unelected pontifex maximus in history, since even the other pontiffs did not get a vote in the matter.

In 63 BC, the law of Sulla was abolished by the tribune Titus Labienus, and a modified form of the lex Domitia was reinstated providing for election by comitia tributa once again: Gaius Julius Caesar followed Ahenobarbus's precedent by being elected by public vote, although Caesar at least had previously been a pontiff. Marcus Antonius later restored the right of co-optatio to the college, in time for the election of Marcus Aemilius Lepidus. Also under Julius Caesar, the number of pontifices were increased to sixteen, the pontifex maximus included. (Possibly because Caesar's own long absences from Rome necessitated the appointment of a deputy pontiff for those occasions when fifteen needed to be present.) The number of pontifices varied during the Empire but is believed to have been regular at fifteen.

=== Extraordinary appointment of dictators ===
The office came into its own with the abolition of the monarchy, when most sacral powers previously vested in the King were transferred either to the pontifex maximus or to the Rex Sacrorum, though traditionally a (non-political) dictator was formally mandated by the Senate for one day, to perform a specific rite.

According to Livy in his "History of Rome," an ancient instruction written in archaic letters commands: "Let him who is the Praetor Maximus fasten a nail on the Ides of September." This notice was fastened on the right side of the Temple of Jupiter Optimus Maximus, next to the chapel of Minerva. This nail is said to have marked the number of the year.

It was in accordance with this direction that the consul Horatius dedicated the Temple of Jupiter Optimus Maximus in the year following the expulsion of the kings; from the Consuls the ceremony of fastening the nails passed to the Dictators, because they possessed greater authority. As the custom had been subsequently dropped, it was felt to be of sufficient importance to require the appointment of a dictator. L[ucius] Manlius was accordingly nominated but his appointment was due to political rather than religious reasons. He was eager to command in the war with the Hernici. He caused an anger among the men liable to serve by the inconsiderate way in which he conducted the enrolment. In consequence of the unanimous resistance offered by the tribunes of the plebs, he gave way, either voluntarily or through compulsion, and laid down his dictatorship. Since then, this rite was performed by the Rex Sacrorum.

==== Duties ====
The main duty of the Pontifices was to maintain the pax deorum or "peace of the gods."

The immense authority of the sacred college of pontiffs was centered on the pontifex maximus, the other pontifices forming his consilium or advising body. His functions were partly sacrificial or ritualistic, but these were the least important. His real power lay in the administration of ius divinum or divine law; the information collected by the pontifices related to the Roman religious tradition was bound in a corpus which summarized dogma and other concepts.

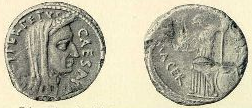
Denarius depicting Julius Caesar as pontifex maximus

The chief departments of jus divinum may be described as follows:

1. The regulation of all expiatory ceremonials needed as a result of pestilence, lightning, etc.
2. The consecration of all temples and other sacred places and objects dedicated to the gods.
3. The regulation of the calendar; both astronomically and in detailed application to the public life of the state.
4. The administration of the law relating to burials and burying-places, and the worship of the manes or dead ancestors.
5. The superintendence of all marriages by confarreatio, i.e. originally of all legal patrician marriages.
6. The administration of the law of adoption and of testamentary succession.
7. The regulation of the public morals, and fining and punishing offending parties.
8. The selection of Vestal Virgins.

The pontifices had many relevant and prestigious functions such as being in charge of caring for the state archives, the keeping the official minutes of elected magistrates, the list of magistrates, and they kept the records of their own decisions (commentarii) and of the chief events of each year, the so-called "public diaries", the Annales maximi.

The pontifex maximus was also subject to several taboos. Among them was the prohibition to leave Italy. Plutarch described Publius Cornelius Scipio Nasica Serapio (141–132 BC) as the first to leave Italy, after being forced by the Senate to do so, and thus break the sacred taboo. Publius Licinius Crassus Dives Mucianus (132–130 BC) was the first to leave Italy voluntarily. Afterwards it became common and no longer against the law for the pontifex maximus to leave Italy. Among the most notable of those who did was Julius Caesar (63–44 BC).

The Pontifices were in charge of the lunisolar Roman calendar and determined when intercalary months needed to be added to synchronize the calendar to the seasons. Since the Pontifices were often politicians, and because a Roman magistrate's term of office corresponded with a calendar year, this power was prone to abuse: a Pontifex could lengthen a year in which he or one of his political allies was in office, or refuse to lengthen one in which his opponents were in power. A Pontifex with other political responsibilities, especially away from Rome, might also have been simply distracted from his calendrical duties as chief priest. This caused the calendar to become out of step with the seasons; for example, Caesar's crossing of the Rubicon in January 49 BC actually took place in mid-autumn.

Under his authority as pontifex maximus, Julius Caesar introduced the calendar reform that created the entirely solar Julian calendar, with a fault of less than a day per century. This calendar remained the standard calendar of the Roman Empire until its collapse, and was used by the state church of the Roman Empire after the adoption of Christianity as the Roman state religion. The Julian calendar, established by Caesar in his capacity as pontifex maximus, thus became the standard calendar in all of Europe, and continued in use in Western Europe until the Gregorian reform in the 16th century.

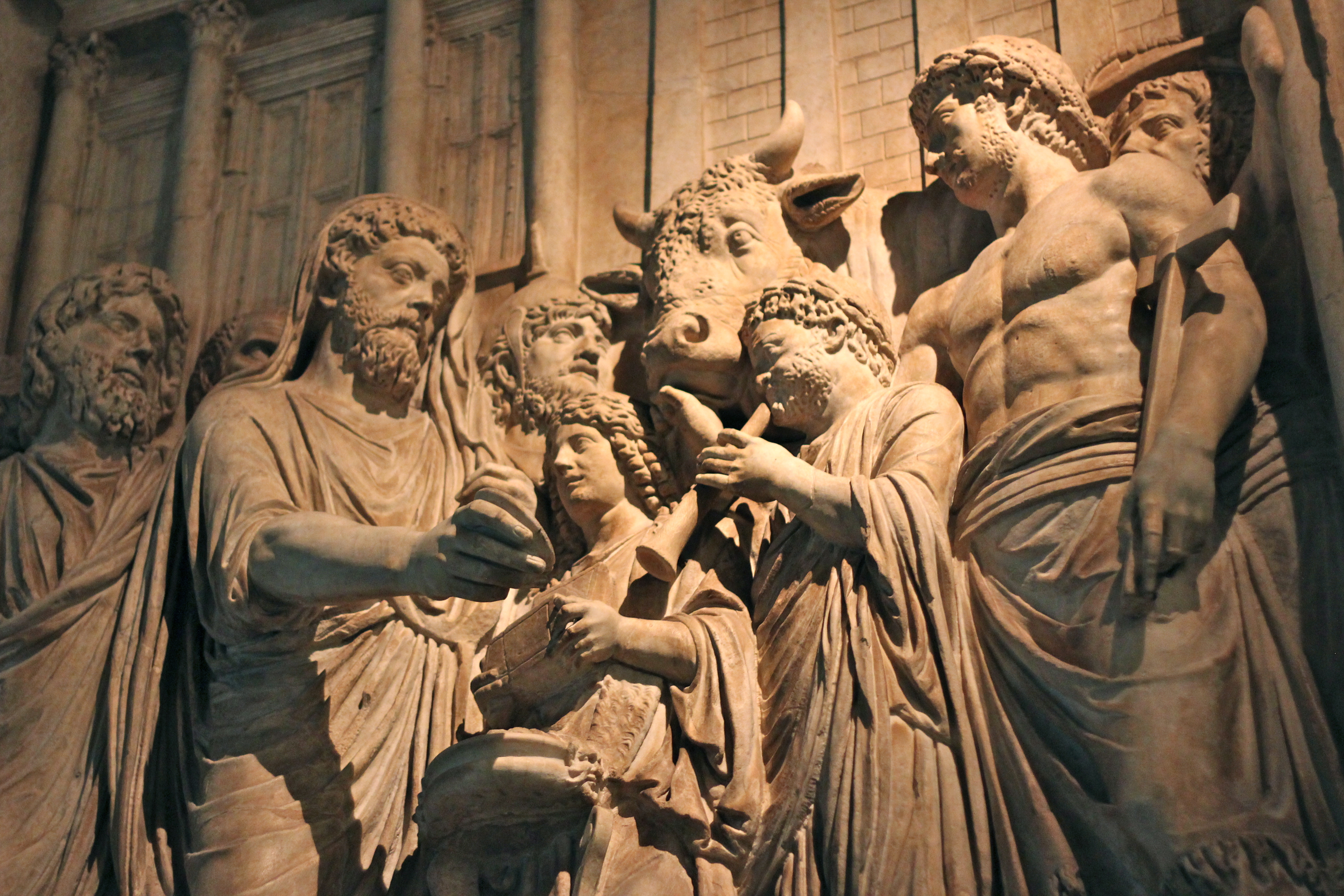
Pontifex maximus and Augustus Marcus Aurelius (r. 161–180) performing sacrifice in a relief from the Arch of Marcus Aurelius (Capitoline Museums)

== The Roman Empire ==
After Julius Caesar's assassination in 44 BC, his ally Marcus Aemilius Lepidus was selected as pontifex maximus. Though Lepidus eventually fell out of political favor and was sent into exile as Augustus consolidated power, he retained the priestly office until his death in 13/12 BC, at which point Augustus was selected to succeed him and given the right to appoint other pontifices. Thus, from the time of Augustus, the election of pontifices ended and membership in the sacred college was deemed a sign of imperial favour. Augustus took the title of pontifex maximus for political gain, in an attempt to restore traditional Roman values. With this attribution, the new office of Emperor was given a religious dignity and the responsibility for the entire Roman state cult. Most authors contend that the power of naming the Pontifices was not really used as an instrumentum regni, an enforcing power.

From this point on, pontifex maximus was one of the many titles of the Emperor, slowly losing its specific and historical powers and becoming simply a referent for the sacral aspect of imperial duties and powers. During the Imperial period, a promagister (vice-master) performed the duties of the pontifex maximus in lieu of the emperors whenever they were absent.

In post-Severan times (after 235 AD), the small number of pagan senators interested in becoming pontiffs led to a change in the pattern of office holding. In Republican and Imperial times no more than one family member of a gens was member of the College of Pontiffs, nor did one person hold more than one priesthood in this collegium. However, these rules were loosened in the later part of the 3rd century A.D. In periods of joint rule, at first only one of the emperors bore this title, as it occurred for the first time during the joint reign of Marcus Aurelius and Lucius Verus (161–169 AD), when only Marcus Aurelius was pontifex maximus, but later two pontifices maximi could serve together, as Pupienus and Balbinus did in 238 AD—a situation unthinkable in Republican times.

=== Late Antiquity ===
When Tertullian, a Montanist, furiously applied the term to a bishop with whom he was at odds (either Pope Callixtus I or Agrippinus of Carthage), ca. 220, over a relaxation of the Church's penitential discipline allowing repentant adulterers and fornicators back into the Church, it was in bitter irony:

In opposition to this [modesty], could I not have acted the dissembler? I hear that there has even been an edict sent forth, and a peremptory one too. The "Pontifex Maximus," that is the "bishop of bishops," issues an edict: "I remit, to such as have discharged [the requirements of] repentance, the sins both of adultery and of fornication." O edict, on which cannot be inscribed, "Good deed!"... Far, far from Christ's betrothed be such a proclamation!

— Tertullian, On Modesty ch. 1

In the Crisis of the Third Century, emperors continued to assume the title pontifex maximus. The early Christian emperors, including Constantine the Great (r. 306–337) and the rest of the Constantinian dynasty, continued to use it; it was only relinquished by Gratian, possibly in 376 at the time of his visit to Rome, or more probably in 383 when a delegation of pagan senators implored him to restore the Altar of Victory in the Roman Senate's Curia Julia. Its last use with reference to the emperors is in inscriptions of Gratian.

The Edict of Thessalonica of 27 February 380 was enacted in Thessalonica (Thessaloniki) and published in Constantinople (Istanbul) for the whole empire. By it, Theodosius I established Nicene Christianity as the state church of the Roman Empire. The Latin text refers to the bishop of Rome, Damasus, as a pontifex, and the bishop of Alexandria, Peter, as an episcopus:

... the profession of that religion which was delivered to the Romans by the divine Apostle Peter, as it has been preserved by faithful tradition and which is now professed by the Pontiff Damasus and by Peter, Bishop of Alexandria ... We authorize the followers of this law to assume the title Catholic Christians ...

Various forms of summus pontifex ('highest pontiff' or bishop) were for centuries used not only of the Bishop of Rome but of other bishops also. Hilary of Arles (d. 449) is styled summus pontifex by Eucherius of Lyon (P. L., vol. L, col. 773).

==== Pontifex inclytus ====
During Gratian's reign or immediately afterwards the phrase pontifex maximus – which had unwelcome associations with traditional Roman religion during the Christianization of the Roman Empire – was replaced in imperial titulature with the phrase: pontifex inclytus. The first to adopt the inclytus alternative to maximus may have been the rebel augustus and devout Christian close to bishop Martin of Tours, Magnus Maximus (r. 383–388), who killed Gratian in August 383.

This practice was followed by Gratian's junior co-emperor Theodosius the Great and was used by emperors thereafter, including the co-augusti Valentinian III (r. 425–455), Marcian (r. 450–457) and the augustus Anastasius Dicorus (r. 491–518), for whom examples of official usage survive. Another inscription dedicated to Justin II (r. 565–574) and naming him pontifex has long been recognized as a forgery, though there is no evidence to suggest the title could not have been used by Justinian the Great (r. 527–565) or even by Constantine IV (r. 654–685).

== Middle Ages ==
Lanfranc is termed primas et pontifex summus by his biographer, Milo Crispin (P. L., vol. CL, 10), but from the 11th century it appears to be applied only to the Pope.

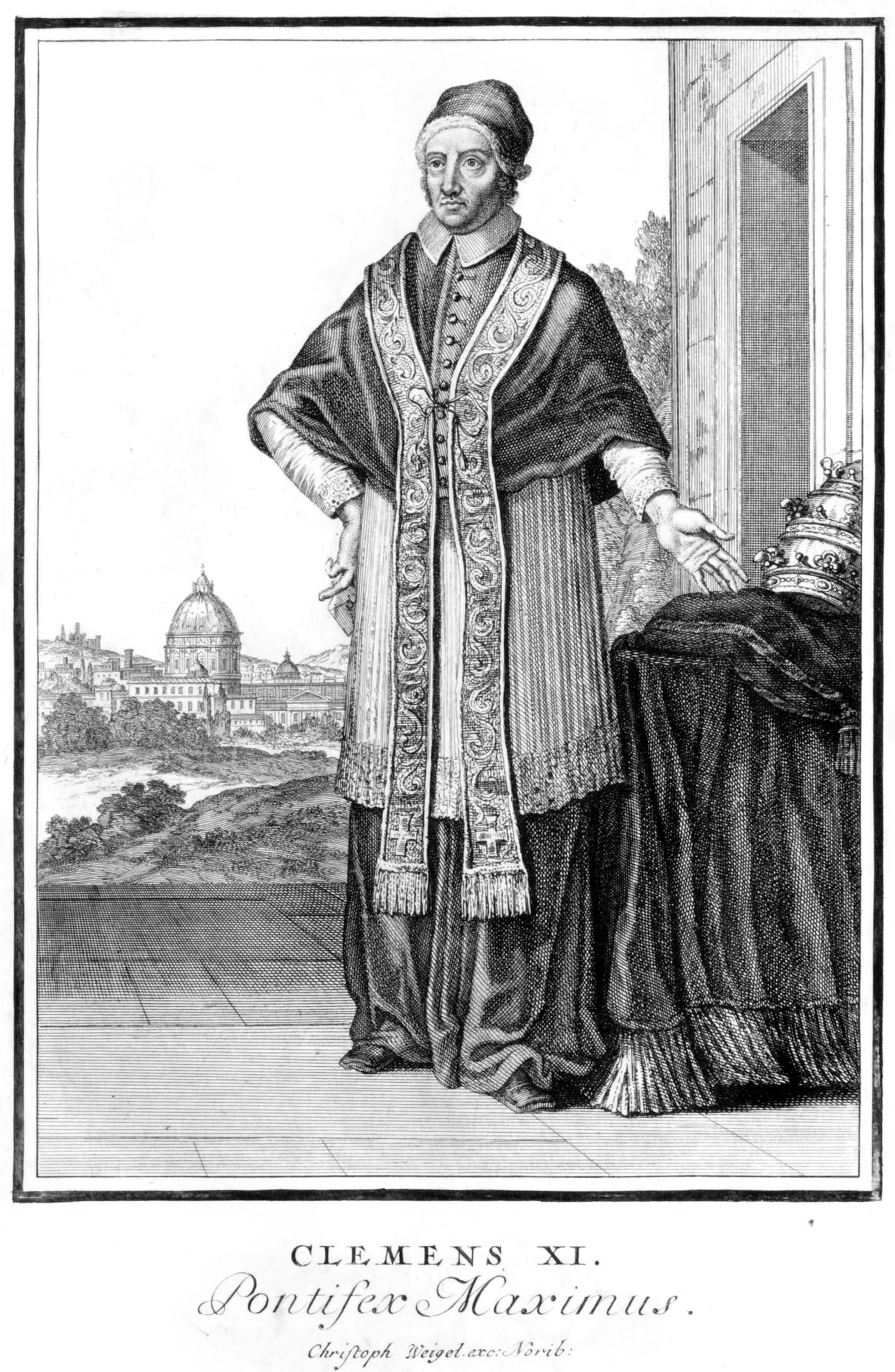
Engraving by Christoph Weigel the Elder of Pope Clement XI, giving him the title pontifex maximus

== Catholic Church use of the title ==
In the 15th century, when the Renaissance drove new interest in ancient Rome, pontifex maximus became a regular title of honour for Popes. After the Fall of the Eastern Roman Empire with the Fall of Constantinople to the Ottoman Empire and the death of the final Roman emperor Constantine XI in 1453, pontifex maximus became part of the papacy's official titulature of the Bishop of Rome. The name given to the book containing the liturgical rites to be performed by any bishop, the Roman Pontifical, and to the form of liturgy known as Pontifical High Mass witness to the continued use of pontifex to refer to bishops in general.

Tertullian (c. 155 – c. 220 AD), in his work "De Pudicitia" (On Modesty), criticized Pope Callixtus I for allowing repentant adulterers and fornicators back into the Church, even if they were repeat offenders, sarcastically referring to him as "Pontifex Maximus."

The Pontifex Maximus — that is, the bishop of bishops — issues an edict: "I remit, to such as have discharged (the requirements of) repentance, the sins both of adultery and of fornication." O edict, on which cannot be inscribed, Good deed!

— Tertullian, On Modesty, Chapter I

While the title pontifex maximus has for some centuries been used in inscriptions referring to the Popes, it has never been included in the official list of papal titles published in the Annuario Pontificio. The official list of titles of the Pope given in the Annuario Pontificio includes "Supreme Pontiff of the Universal Church" (in Latin, Summus Pontifex Ecclesiae Universalis) as the fourth title, the first being "Bishop of Rome." The title pontifex maximus appears in inscriptions on buildings and on coins and medallions.

In December 2012, Pope Benedict XVI adopted @pontifex as his Twitter (now X) handle, prompting users to pose questions with the #askpontifex hashtag. This has been maintained by his successors Pope Francis and Pope Leo XIV.

== See also ==
- List of pontifices maximi
- Katechon
- Papal titles

== Bibliography ==
- Cameron, Alan (2016). "Pontifex Maximus: from Augustus to Gratian – and Beyond" (PDF). Collegium: 139–159.
- Dijkstra, Roald; Espelo, Dorine Van (2017). "Anchoring Pontifical Authority: A Reconsideration of the Papal Employment of the Title Pontifex Maximus". Journal of Religious History. 41 (3): 312–325. doi:10.1111/1467-9809.12400. hdl:2066/160382.
