= Oppidia gens =

Ancient Roman family

The gens Oppidia was a minor plebeian family at ancient Rome. Few members of this gens are mentioned by ancient writers, of whom the best known may be Servius Oppidius, whose advice to his sons is described by the poet Horace.

== Origin ==
The nomen of this gens, Oppidius, belongs to a class of gentilicia formed from other names, in this case Oppius, by means of the suffix -idius. The root of the nomen is probably op-, "help", which occurs in the name of the goddess Ops, as well as the gentes Opsia, Opsidia, and Opsilia, and probably also in the praenomen Opiter, and its derived gentilicia, Opiternia and Opetreia. Many of these names appear to be of Sabine or Samnite origin.

== Members ==
This list includes abbreviated praenomina. For an explanation of this practice, see filiation.

- Servius Oppidius, a resident of Canusium, divided his estate between his sons, whom he urged to avoid excessive spending or hoarding.
- Aulus Oppidius Ser. f., advised by his father not to become a spendthrift.
- Tiberius Oppidius Ser. f., advised by his father not to become a miser.
- Quintus Oppidius Faustus, a freedman buried at Allifae in Campania.
- Oppidia Q. f. Galla, named in an inscription from Saepinum in Samnium.
- Gaius Oppidius Peregrinus, named in a list of soldiers serving in the Praetorian Guard at Rome, dating to AD 210.
- Oppidia Phylacia, a freedwoman buried at Allifae.
- Quintus Oppidius Probus, a freedman buried at Allifae, aged twenty.
- Oppidia C. f. Rufa, mother of Marcus Granius Cordus, a veteran soldier and one of the municipal officials of Allifae.
- Oppidia Specula, a freedwoman buried at Allifae, aged twenty-one.

== See also ==
- List of Roman gentes

== Bibliography ==
- Quintus Horatius Flaccus (Horace), Satirae (Satires).
- Dictionary of Greek and Roman Biography and Mythology, William Smith, ed., Little, Brown and Company, Boston (1849).
- Theodor Mommsen et alii, Corpus Inscriptionum Latinarum (The Body of Latin Inscriptions, abbreviated CIL), Berlin-Brandenburgische Akademie der Wissenschaften (1853–present).
- George Davis Chase, "The Origin of Roman Praenomina", in Harvard Studies in Classical Philology, vol. VIII (1897).
- Paul von Rohden, Elimar Klebs, & Hermann Dessau, Prosopographia Imperii Romani (The Prosopography of the Roman Empire, abbreviated PIR), Berlin (1898).
