= Tussania gens =

Ancient Roman family

The gens Tussania, occasionally written Tusania, was a minor plebeian family at ancient Rome. Only a few members of this gens appear in history, but others are known from inscriptions.

== Origin ==
The nomen Tussanius belongs to a class of gentilicia formed from cognomina ending in -anus, frequently derived from place-names. Many names of this type came from Umbria, where a number of inscriptions of this gens are found, pointing to a probable Umbrian origin for the Tussanii.

== Praenomina ==
The main praenomina of the Tussanii were Lucius and Gnaeus, both common throughout all periods of Roman history, supplemented with other common names, including Gaius, Quintus, and Titus. From filiations, we know that they also used Publius, Servius, Sextus, and Vibius, of which Servius and Vibius were uncommon at Rome, although Servius was favoured by a few prominent families. Besides these, the Tussanii known from epigraphy afford a rare example of the old praenomen Postumus from imperial times, as well as an example of the feminine praenomen Paulla.

== Branches and cognomina ==
Besides the Tussanii found at Rome, a number of inscriptions place members of this gens in Umbria, likely their ancestral homeland. Another family of Tussanii seems to have settled at Perusia in Etruria, the region of Italy most closely connected with Umbria, both geographically and culturally. A third branch of this gens went to Turgalium in Lusitania.

== Members ==
This list includes abbreviated praenomina. For an explanation of this practice, see filiation.

- Vibius Tusanius C. f. Caleide, inurned in a first-century BC cinerarium at Pitinum in Umbria.
- Lucius Tussanius Sex. f. Niger, inurned in a first-century BC cinerarium at Perusia in Etruria.
- Pola Tussania, (Note: Pola is a variation of Paulla.) buried at Pitinum, in a tomb dating from the latter half of the first century BC.
- Gaius Tussanius L. f. Rufus, built a first-century family sepulchre at Rome.
- Lucius Tussanius L. f. Tarentinus, inurned in a first-century BC cinerarium at Perusia.
- Lucius Tussanius Q. f. Rufus, a youth buried at Turgalium in Lusitania, aged sixteen, in a tomb dating from the middle portion of the first century.
- Tussania Trophime, buried along with her husband, Lucius Otacilius Herma, in a first- or second-century tomb at Rome, built by their son, Gnaeus Tussanius Fortunatus.
- Gnaeus Tussanius Fortunatus, built a first- or second-century tomb at Rome for his parents, Lucius Otacilius Herma and Tussania Trophime.
- Postumus Tussanius Cn. f. Proculus, quaestor in an uncertain year, was inurned at Rome in a cinerarium dating to the late first or early second century.
- Gnaeus Tussanius, P[...], (Note: PIR suggests "Proculus" for his surname, since there was a Postumus Tussanius Proculus who was the son of Gnaeus around the same time period; but PIR notes that the partly-obscured portion of the inscription could instead be a filiation, "P. f."), along with Valeria Tussania, named in an inscription from Ostia in Latium, dating between the late first century and the end of the second, as heirs of a consul (Note: This reading too is uncertain. PIR interprets it as stating that Tussanius was a juristconsult, or possibly was himself consul—which seems possible, given that many consuls of the imperial era remain unknown, although no known consuls were Tussanii.) whose name does not appear in the remaining portion of the inscription.
- Valeria P. f. Tussania, (Note: Normally the placement of Tussania following her filiation would suggest that her nomen was Valeria, but since the same inscription mentions a relative named Gnaeus Tussanius, Valeria was likely also a member of the Tussania gens.) apparently named in an inscription from Ostia, dating between the late first century and the end of the second, as one of the heirs of an unidentified consul.
- Tussania Briseis, dedicated a tomb at Pitinum for her son, Gaius Planius Priscus, aged thirty-nine years, nine months, and twenty-nine days. He had been aedile, twice quaestor, quattuorvir jure dicundo, and augur.
- Tussania Phyllis, buried at Rome, along with her husband, Gnaeus Tussanius Primigenius, in a second-century tomb built by their son, also named Gnaeus Tussanius Primigenius.
- Gnaeus Tussanius Primigenius, buried at Rome, along with his wife, Tussania Phyllis, in a second-century tomb built by their son, also named Gnaeus Tussanius Primigenius.
- Gnaeus Tussanius Cn. f. Primigenius, built a second-century tomb at Rome for his parents, Gnaeus Tussanius Primigenius and Tussania Phyllis.
- Tussanius Aristo, a senator, and procurator at Carthage in the time of Commodus.
- Titus Tussanius Restitutus, a native of Tuder in Umbria, was a soldier in the twelfth urban cohort at Rome in AD 202. He served in the century of Vernasius.
- Lucius Tussanius Symbiotus, a soldier in the fifth cohort of the vigiles at Rome in AD 205. He served in the century of Valens.
- Tussanius, buried at Rome, aged twenty-six, in a fourth-century tomb built by his wife of eleven years, Pardale.

=== Undated Tussanii ===
- Titus Tussanius, named in an inscription from Rome, dated the third day before the Ides of October. (Note: October 13, by modern reckoning.)
- Gaius Tussanius Clemens, made an offering to Jupiter Optimus Maximus at Turgalium.
- Quintus Tussanius Julianus, made an offering to Jupiter Optimus Maximus at Turgalium.
- Gaius Tussanius Mestus, named in an inscription from Pisaurum in Umbria.
- Tussanius Paetinus, named in a sepulchral inscription from Tuder.
- Tussania Ser. f. Tertia, named in a sepulchral inscription from Mons Fereter in Umbria.

== See also ==
- List of Roman gentes

== Bibliography ==
- Theodor Mommsen et alii, Corpus Inscriptionum Latinarum (The Body of Latin Inscriptions, abbreviated CIL), Berlin-Brandenburgische Akademie der Wissenschaften (1853–present).
- Bullettino della Commissione Archeologica Comunale in Roma (Bulletin of the Municipal Archaeological Commission of Rome, abbreviated BCAR), (1872–present).
- René Cagnat et alii, L'Année épigraphique (The Year in Epigraphy, abbreviated AE), Presses Universitaires de France (1888–present).
- George Davis Chase, "The Origin of Roman Praenomina", in Harvard Studies in Classical Philology, vol. VIII, pp. 103–184 (1897).
- Paul von Rohden, Elimar Klebs, & Hermann Dessau, Prosopographia Imperii Romani (The Prosopography of the Roman Empire, abbreviated PIR), Berlin (1898).
- Inscriptiones Christianae Urbis Romae (Christian Inscriptions from the City of Rome, abbreviated ICUR), New Series, Rome (1922–present).
