= Spuria gens =

Ancient Roman family

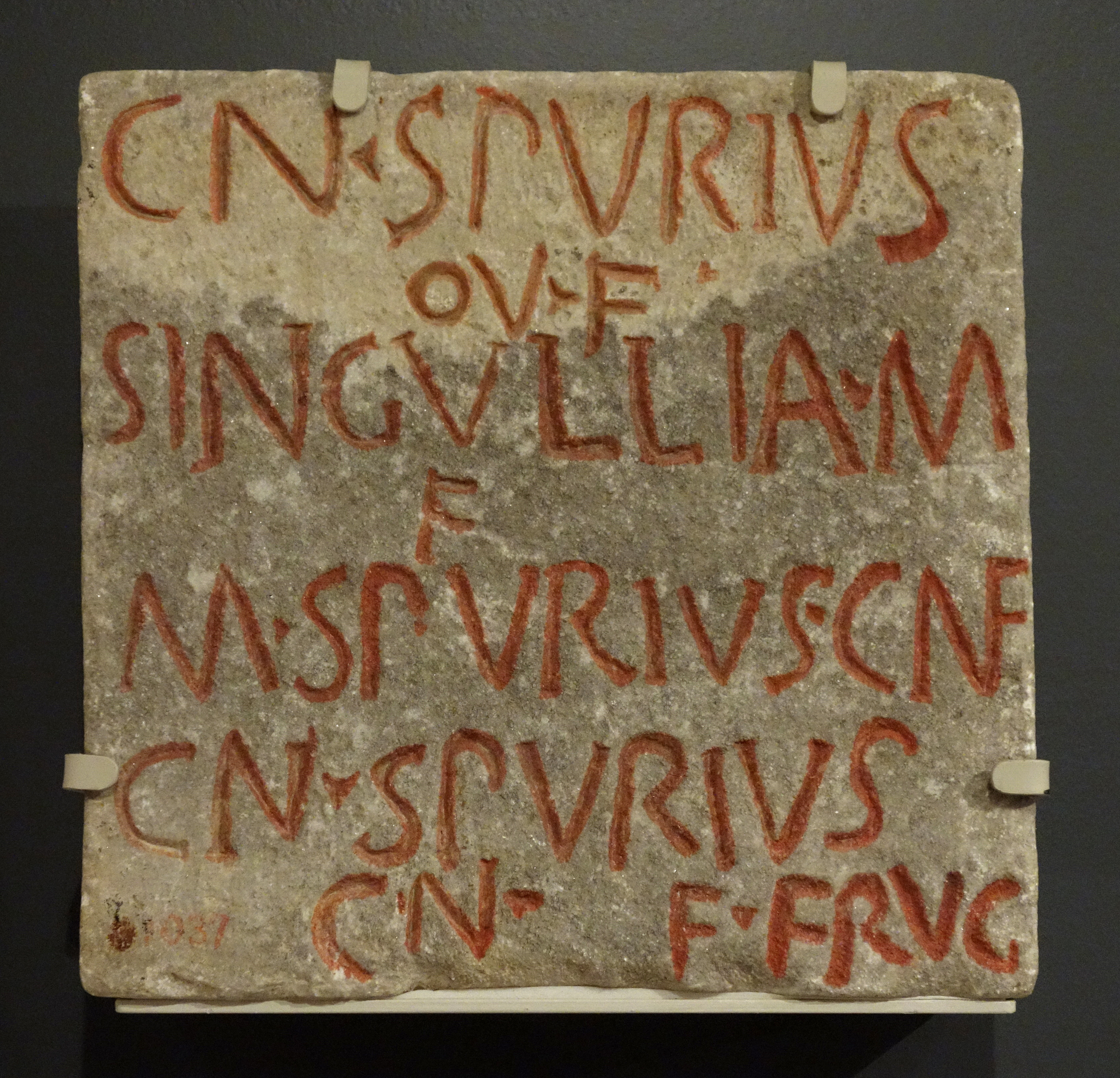
Funerary inscription of Gnaeus Spurius, his wife Singullia, and their sons, Marcus Spurius and Gnaeus Spurius Frugi, from Cumae, second century BC.

The gens Spuria was a minor plebeian family at ancient Rome. Few members of this gens occur in ancient writers, but many are known from inscriptions. Although at least some were of equestrian rank, and a number of Spurii held public offices in the various municipia, the most illustrious person of this name may have been Lucius Spurius Maximus, a tribune of the Vigiles at Rome during the reign of Septimius Severus.

== Origin ==
The nomen Spurius is a patronymic surname derived from the praenomen Spurius, without a change in morphology. The original meaning of the praenomen is unclear; it was fairly common in the early Republic, and favoured in many prominent families, but grew less abundant over time, becoming rare by imperial times, probably due to its association with the adjective spurius, meaning "illegitimate". An Etruscan origin has been proposed, in which the name might have meant something akin to "city dweller", and been synonymous with the Latin praenomen Publius. Although the praenomen eventually vanished into obscurity, as a gentilicium, Spurius remained common throughout the centuries of the empire.

== Praenomina ==
The main praenomina of the Spurii were Lucius and Gaius, the two most common names throughout Roman history. To a lesser degree, they used a variety of other common praenomina, including Marcus, Quintus, Aulus, and Sextus. Among the more unusual praenomina they used was the Oscan name Ovius, known from the filiation of one of the Spurii at Cumae in Campania.

== Members ==
This list includes abbreviated praenomina. For an explanation of this practice, see filiation.

- Spuria A. l., a freedwoman named in an inscription from Rome.
- Spuria L. l., a freedwoman buried in a family sepulchre at Rome, dating to the first half of the first century, and dedicated by her son, Lucius Spurius Communis, for his mother, his brother, Lucius Spurius Picentinus, patron, Lucius Spurius Heracles, and Visena Olympia.
- Aulus Spurius C. f., dedicated a second-century tomb at Rome for his brother, Gaius Spurius Maximus, a soldier in the Praetorian Guard.
- Gaius Spurius, made an offering to Mercury at Boutae in Gallia Narbonensis.
- Gaius Spurius, buried in a second century tomb at Caesarea in Mauretania Caesariensis.
- Gnaeus Spurius Ov. f., the husband of Singullia, and father of Marcus Spurius and Gnaeus Spurius Frugi, named in an inscription from Cumae in Campania, dating from the last quarter of the second century BC.
- Lucius Spurius, a soldier named in an inscription from Rome, dating from AD 134.
- Lucius Spurius, the former master of Spuria Pieris, Lucius Spurius Theophanes, and Lucius Spurius Fortunatus.
- Marcus Spurius Cn. f. Ov. n., the son of Gnaeus Spurius and Singullia, named in a late second-century BC inscription from Cumae.
- Numerius Spurius D. f., named in an inscription from Capua in Campania, dating from 105 BC.
- Sextus Spurius, made a gift of money to a shrine at Herculaneum in Campania, during the latter half of the first century BC.
- Spuria L. l. Acte, a freedwoman buried at Ostia in Latium, in a family sepulchre built by her client, Lucius Spurius Felix.
- Aulus Spurius Antiochus, buried at Nola in Campania, between 20 BC and AD 70.
- Lucius Spurius L. l. Auctus, a freedman buried at Aletrium in Latium, along with Lucius Spurius Tertius, Tuccia Salvia, and Spuria Calliste.
- Spuria Q. f. Augustina, buried at Verona in Venetia and Histria, along with her brother, Quintus Spurius Secundus, in a second-century family sepulchre built by their father, Quintus Spurius Senecio.
- Spuria L. l. Calliste, a freedwoman buried at Aletrium, along with Lucius Spurius Tertius, Lucius Spurius Auctus, and Tuccia Salvia.
- Spurius Campanus, dedicated a monument at Velia in Lucania to his foster-son, Lucretius, aged nine.
- Gaius Spurius Caninus, dedicated a second- or third-century tomb at Comum in Transalpine Gaul for his wife, Isias.
- Lucius Spurius Celer, made an offering to Silvanus at Aquileia in Venetia and Histria, during the third century, in memory of Gaius Avilius Florus, a veteran of the fifth cohort of the Praetorian Guard.
- Gaius Spurius Cerinthus, named along with Cocceia Anth[...] in an inscription from Arretium in Etruria, dating to the latter half of the first century AD.
- Spurius Cleopater, made an offering at the site of modern Obedinenie, formerly part of Moesia Inferior, during the second or third century.
- Lucius Spurius L. l. Communis, a freedman who built a family sepulchre at Rome, dating to the first half of the first century, for his mother, Spuria, brother, Lucius Spurius Picentinus, patron, Lucius Spurius Heraclea, and Visena Olympia.
- Sextus Spurius Decuminus, buried at Nemausus in Gallia Narbonensis, along with his parents, Spurius Statutus and Decumia Remulla.
- Spurius Erugios, made an offering to Temavus at Aquileia.
- Spuria Euplia, dedicated a tomb at Nemausus for her husband, Gaius Julius Albus.
- Spurius Fabatus, buried in a second-century Sepulchre at Comum, along with Spurius Quintus and Aeno, the son of Aupledo.
- Spuria Felicula, dedicated a tomb at Nemausus for her husband, Gnaeus Satrius Chresimus.
- Lucius Spurius Felix, built a family sepulchre at Ostia for himself, his patron, Spuria Acte, his wife, Spuria Pieris, daughters, Spuria Primilla and Spuria Secundilla, along with another Lucius Spurius Felix, either his son or freedman, Spuria Sabbatis, and Satria Sabina.
- Lucius Spurius L. Ɔ. l. Felix, a freedman buried in a family sepulchre at Ostia, built by another Lucius Spurius Felix, either his father or former master.
- Spuria Firmina, buried at Brixellum in Cisalpine Gaul, aged eight years, five months, and fifteen days, in a second-century tomb dedicated by Quintus Cassius Elpidephorus, one of the Seviri Augustales, and perhaps Spuria's father, and his brother, Mettelus Restutus.
- Gaius Spurius Firmus, a little boy buried at Rome, aged four years, two months, in a tomb dedicated by his parents.
- Gaius Spurius Fortunalis, dedicated a tomb at Emerita in Lusitania for his son, Gaius Spurius Peregrinus.
- Lucius Spurius L. l. Fortunatus, a freedman, and one of the Seviri Augustales at Ostia, along with Decimus Calpurnius Primigenius and Lucius Spurius Theophanes, together with whom he dedicated a first-century tomb for Spuria Pieris.
- Gnaeus Spurius Cn. f. Ov. n. Frugi, the son of Gnaeus Spurius and Singullia, named in a late second-century BC inscription from Cumae.
- Titus Spurius Gratinus, buried at Ucetia in Gallia Narbonensis, in a tomb dedicated by his client, Titus Spurius Vitalis.
- Lucius Spurius L. l. Heracles, a freedman buried in a family sepulchre at Rome, dating to the first half of the first century, and dedicated by his client, Lucius Spurius Communis, for his mother, Spuria, brother, Lucius Spurius Picentinus, his patron, and Visena Olympia.
- Spuria Jucunda, buried at Mediolanum, in a tomb dedicated by her husband, Gaius Tertullienius Maximus, dating between AD 50 and 200.
- Spuria Sex. l. Lesbia, a freedwoman mentioned in an inscription from Rome, dating to the late first century BC, or early first century AD.
- Spurius Macer, named in an inscription from Pompeii in Campania.
- Spuria Materna, buried at Comum between the first and third century, with a monument dedicated by her son-in-law, Aelius Alexander, and children Maternus, Secundiena, and Fortunatus.
- Marcus Spurius Mesor, named in an inscription from Pompeii.
- Gaius Spurius C. f. Maximus, a native of Florentia in Etruria, was a soldier in the second cohort of the Praetorian Guard, serving in the century of Ebulius Justus. He was buried in a second-century tomb at Rome, aged thirty-six years, having served for sixteen years, with a monument from his brother, Aulus Spurius.
- Lucius Spurius Maximus, tribune of the fourth cohort of the vigiles at Rome, according to an inscription dating between AD 198 and 205, during the reign of Septimius Severus. He is probably the same person as the eques Spurius Maximus whose name was found on a lead water pipe at Rome.
- Gaius Spurius Niger, built a tomb at Mediolanum in Cisalpine Gaul, dating to the early or middle first century, for himself and Licinia Acumis.
- Gaius Spurius C. f. Peregrinus, buried at Emerita, aged thirty-four years, seven months, and one day, in a tomb dedicated by his father, Gaius Spurius Fortunalis.
- Lucius Spurius L. l. Picentinus, a freedman buried in a family sepulchre at Rome, dating from the first half of the first century, and dedicated by his brother, Lucius Spurius Communis, for his brother, his mother, Spuria, patron, Lucius Spurius Heracles, and Visena Olympia.
- Spuria L. l. Pieris, a freedwoman buried at Ostia, in a tomb dedicated by the Seviri Augustales Decimus Calpurnius Primigenius, Lucius Spurius Theophanes, and Lucius Spurius Fortunatus.
- Spuria L. l. Pieris, a freedwoman buried at Ostia, in a family sepulchre built by her husband, Lucius Spurius Felix, along with their patron, Spuria Acte, daughters, Spuria Primilla and Spuria Secundilla, another Lucius Spurius Felix, either a son or freedman, and Spuria Sabbatis.
- Sextus Spurius Piperolus, an aerarius, or coppersmith, who dedicated a tomb at Nemausus for himself and his wife, Secunda.
- Spuria L. l. Primilla, a freedwoman buried in a family sepulchre built by her father, Lucius Spurius Felix, at Ostia, along with her mother, Spuria Pieris, sister, Spuria Secundilla, and others.
- Quintus Spurius Primulus, dedicated a tomb at Nemausus for his wife, whose name has not been preserved.
- Spurius Quintus, buried in a second century tomb at Comum, along with Spurius Fabatus and Aeno, the son of Aupledo.
- Lucius Spurius Restitutus, made an offering to Hercules at Siscia in Pannonia Superior, dating to the second century, or the early part of the third.
- Marcus Spurius M. f. Rufus, one of the municipal duumviri at Herculaneum, between 40 and 20 BC.
- Spuria L. Ɔ. l. Sabbatis, a freedwoman buried in a family sepulchre at Ostia, built by Lucius Spurius Felix.
- Spurius Salu, made an offering to Mercury at Mediolanum during the third century.
- Gaius Spurius Saturninus, buried at Mediolanum between AD 50 and 200.
- Spuria Secunda, buried at Ticinum in Cisalpine Gaul, along with her husband, Lucius Salvius, and son, Lucius Salvius Secundus, in a first-century tomb dedicated by her son, Lucius Salvius Niger.
- Spuria L. l. Secundilla, a freedwoman buried in a family sepulchre at Ostia, built by her father, Lucius Spurius Felix.
- Marcus Spurius Secundus, buried at Rome, with a monument from his wife, Caelia Festa.
- Marcus Spurius Secundus, dedicated a monument at the present site of Bouzid Ben Aleya, formerly part of Africa Proconsularis, to his wife, Livia Laetina, aged forty-two.
- Quintus Spurius Q. f. Secundus, buried at Verona, along with his sister, Spuria Augustina, in a second-century family sepulchre built by their father, Quintus Spurius Senecio.
- Quintus Spurius Senecio, built a second-century family sepulchre at Verona for himself and his children, Quintus Spurius Secundus and Spuria Augustina.
- Lucius Spurius Severianus, a soldier in the fifth cohort of the vigiles at Rome, serving in the century of Caesernius Senecio, in AD 210.
- Spurius Severus, built a sepulchre at Arausio in Gallia Narbonensis.
- Gaius Spurius Silvanus, a centurion in the Legio X Gemina, together with Valeria Digna, made an offering to Jupiter Optimus Maximus Dolichenus at Carnuntum in Pannonia Superior, between AD 180 and 191.
- Spurius Statutus, buried at Nemausus, along with his wife, Decumia Remulla, and their son, Sextus Spurius Decuminus.
- Spurius Suruco, made an offering to Jupiter Optimus Maximus and Juno Regina at Aquincum in Pannonia Inferior, during the latter half of the second century.
- Lucius Spurius L. l. Tertius, a freedman buried at Aletrium, along with Lucius Spurius Auctus, Tuccia Salvia, and Spuria Calliste.
- Lucius Spurius L. l. Theophanes, a freedman, and one of the Seviri Augustales at Ostia, along with Decimus Calpurnius Primigenius and Lucius Spurius Fortunatus, together with whom he dedicated a first-century tomb for Spuria Pieris.
- Gaius Spurius Valens, one of the Seviri Augustales at Mediolanum, buried in a first-century family sepulchre, built by Titus Pomponius Valentinus, probably a close relative.
- Lucius Spurius Valens, named in a late second-century inscription from Aquileia.
- Spurius Valentinus, named in a third-century inscription from Comum.
- Titus Spurius Vitalis, dedicated a tomb at Ucetia for his patron, Titus Spurius Gratinus.

== See also ==
- List of Roman gentes

== Bibliography ==
- Theodor Mommsen et alii, Corpus Inscriptionum Latinarum (The Body of Latin Inscriptions, abbreviated CIL), Berlin-Brandenburgische Akademie der Wissenschaften (1853–present).
- Wilhelm Henzen, Ephemeris Epigraphica: Corporis Inscriptionum Latinarum Supplementum (Journal of Inscriptions: Supplement to the Corpus Inscriptionum Latinarum, abbreviated EE), Institute of Roman Archaeology, Rome (1872–1913).
- Wilhelm Deecke, "Der Dativ Larθiale und der Stammerweiterung auf -ali" ("The Dative Larθiale and the Extension of Stems with -ali"), in Etruskische Forschungen und Studien (Etruscan Research and Studies), Albert Heitz, Stuttgart, vol. II (1882).
- Ettore Pais, Corporis Inscriptionum Latinarum Supplementa Italica (Italian Supplement to the Corpus Inscriptionum Latinarum), Rome (1884).
- René Cagnat et alii, L'Année épigraphique (The Year in Epigraphy, abbreviated AE), Presses Universitaires de France (1888–present).
- August Pauly, Georg Wissowa, et alii, Realencyclopädie der Classischen Altertumswissenschaft (Scientific Encyclopedia of the Knowledge of Classical Antiquities, abbreviated RE or PW), J. B. Metzler, Stuttgart (1894–1980).
- George Davis Chase, "The Origin of Roman Praenomina", in Harvard Studies in Classical Philology, vol. VIII, pp. 103–184 (1897).
- Paul von Rohden, Elimar Klebs, & Hermann Dessau, Prosopographia Imperii Romani (The Prosopography of the Roman Empire, abbreviated PIR), Berlin (1898).
- Emilio Seletti, Marmi iscritti del Museo Archeologico (Marble Inscriptions in the Archaeological Museum), Mailand (1901).
- Marta Giacobelli, in Gli dèi propizi: La Basilica Hilariana nel contesto dello scavo dell'Ospedale Militare del Celio (1987–2000) (The Propitious Gods: The Basilica Hilariana in the Context of the Excavation of the Celio Military Hospital, 1987–2000), Paola Palazzo & Carlo Pavolini, eds., pp. 418, 419, Rome (2013).
