= Opsidia gens =

Ancient Roman family

The gens Opsidia or Obsidia was an obscure plebeian family at ancient Rome. Few members of this gens are known to have held any magistracies, but several are found in inscriptions. One Obsidius gave his name to the volcanic glass obsidian.

== Origin ==
The nomen Opsidius belongs to a class of gentilicia formed from other names using the suffix -idius. In this case the nomen is derived from the more common Opsius; the same nomen also gives rise to the gens Opsilia. The common root of all three nomina is op-, "help", found in the name of the goddess Ops, as well as the praenomen Opiter, and the derived patronymics Opiternius and Opetreius, and the nomen Oppius.

Most of these names are thought to be of Sabine or Samnite origin, and in some writers we find the nomen Obsidius, apparently an orthographic variation of Opsidius, among the Frentani, a Samnite people. At a later period, a Roman traveler of this name is said to have discovered the type of volcanic rock now known as obsidian, which became highly fashionable at Rome.

== Members ==
This list includes abbreviated praenomina. For an explanation of this practice, see filiation.

- Opsidia, named in an inscription from Interpromium in Samnium.
- Obsidius, (Note: Plutarch calls him Oplacus; Dionysius Oblacus Vulsinius, but Florus appears to have preserved the original name, Obsidius.) led a Frentanian cavalry troop under the command of the consul Publius Valerius Laevinus in 280 BC, during the War against Pyrrhus. Obsidius made a daring charge toward Pyrrhus, and succeeded in unhorsing him, but was slain by the king's bodyguard.
- Obsidius, (Note: Found indistinctly written in manuscripts of Pliny, sometimes read as Obaidius, which Sillig amended to Obsius; but as Obsidius is a genuine, if uncommon nomen, that appears to be the correct reading.) a Roman traveler in Aethiopia, discovered a type of volcanic glass, which subsequently became a popular ornamental stone at Rome, known as lapis obsidianus, or obsidian.
- Gaius Opsidius Geminus, one of two brothers buried at Arusnates in the province of Venetia et Histria, sons of Valeria Maxima.
- Opsidia C. f. Maxsuma, (Note: i.e. Maxima.) probably the wife of Titus Castrucius, named in an inscription at Patavium in the province of Venetia et Histria.
- Gaius Opsidius C. f. Primus, a freedman named in an inscription from Interpromium.
- Publius Opsidius P. f. Rufus, (Note: Also read as Obsidius.) a military tribune in the fourth legion at Patavium, was praefectus fabrum, or chief of the engineers and artisans of the legion.
- Lucius Opsidius Severus, one of two brothers buried at Fumane, sons of Valeria Maxima.

== See also ==
- List of Roman gentes

== Bibliography ==
- Dionysius of Halicarnassus, Romaike Archaiologia (Roman Antiquities).
- Gaius Plinius Secundus (Pliny the Elder), Naturalis Historia (Natural History).
- Plutarchus, Lives of the Noble Greeks and Romans.
- Lucius Annaeus Florus, Epitome de T. Livio Bellorum Omnium Annorum DCC (Epitome of Livy: All the Wars of Seven Hundred Years).
- Dictionary of Greek and Roman Biography and Mythology, William Smith, ed., Little, Brown and Company, Boston (1849).
- Theodor Mommsen et alii, Corpus Inscriptionum Latinarum (The Body of Latin Inscriptions, abbreviated CIL), Berlin-Brandenburgische Akademie der Wissenschaften (1853–present).
- George Davis Chase, "The Origin of Roman Praenomina", in Harvard Studies in Classical Philology, vol. VIII (1897).
