= Abudia gens =

Ancient Roman family

The gens Abudia was an obscure plebeian family at ancient Rome. This gens flourished during imperial times, and none of its members held any of the higher magistracies of the Roman state. Only Abudius Ruso, who had been aedile under Tiberius, is mentioned in history, but other Abudii are known from inscriptions.

== Praenomina ==
The chief praenomina of the Abudii were Marcus, Publius, and Titus, each of which was very common throughout Roman history. Epigraphy also supplies examples of Gnaeus, Lucius, and Quintus.

== Members ==
This list includes abbreviated praenomina. For an explanation of this practice, see filiation.

- Abudius Ruso, a former aedile, had commanded a legion under Gnaeus Cornelius Lentulus Gaetulicus in Germania Superior. He was one of the delatores who accused Lentulus, but when the accusation failed, Abudius was instead condemned and exiled from Rome. Abudius' motivation for denouncing Lentulus may have been blackmail. The nature of his accusation is also unclear, but it might have been based on the betrothal of Lentulus' daughter to the son of Sejanus.
- Abudius, named in a first-century inscription from Virunum in Noricum.
- Lucius Abudius L. f., named in an inscription from Vasio in Gallia Narbonensis.
- Gnaeus Abudius Fortunatus, buried at Rome, in a family sepulchre dedicated by his wife, Octavia Faustilla, and dating to the late first century, or the first half of the second.
- Marcus Abudius Luminaris, dedicated a tomb at Rome for his client and wife, Abudia Megiste, and their son, Marcus Abudius Saturninus.
- Abudia Maxima, dedicated a tomb for her son at Iader in Dalmatia, dating between the mid-second century and the end of the third.
- Abudia M. l. Megiste, a freedwoman, and the client and wife of Marcus Abudius Luminaris, perhaps her former master, who dedicated a tomb at Rome for Abudia and their son, Marcus Abudius Saturninus.
- Abudia Murinilla, dedicated a tomb at Carnuntum in Pannonia Superior, dating to the latter half of the second century, for her husband, Crescens Licinianus, probably a tribune in the eighteenth cohort of volunteers from Mauretania, aged forty-five.
- Abudia Phlegusa, dedicated a tomb at Nemausus in Gallia Narbonensis to her freedman, Gellius.
- Abudia Prima, buried at Rome, in a tomb dedicated by her husband, Epaphroditus, and dating from the latter half of the first century.
- Abudia Prima, buried in a family sepulchre at Aquileia in Venetia and Histria, built by Titus Albius Rufus, a soldier in the Legio VIII Augusta, either her son or son-in-law, and dating to the late first century.
- Titus Abudius T. f. Priscus, a native of Aquileia, was a veteran of the Legio VII Claudia, and was buried at Scupi in Moesia Superior, aged eighty-five, in a tomb dedicated by his wife, Felicula, dating from the late first century, or the first half of the second.
- Abudius Priscus Cassidarius Demetrius, along with Cerlerinus Statienus Clementianus, one of the agents of the municipal decurions at Gabii in AD 220.
- Abudia Q. f. Publia, buried in a third-century tomb at Pola in Venetia and Histria, dedicated by her parents, Quintus Postumius and Albudia Publia, and brother, Publius.
- Marcus Abudius Seleucus, dedicated tombs at Rome for his brother, Gaius Attius Venustus, and sister, the freedwoman Attia Primigenia.
- Abudia Satura, a woman buried at Ammaedara in Africa Proconsularis, aged eighty.
- Marcus Abudius M. f. Saturninus, a boy buried at Rome, aged eight, along with his mother, Abudia Megiste, in a tomb dedicated by his father, Marcus Abudius Luminaris.
- Quintus Abudius Theodotus, the freedman of Fronto, made an offering to the goddesses of Vasio.
- Abudius Verus, dedicated a first-century monument at Parentium in Venetia and Histria in memory of his mother, Junia Varilla, and siblings, Publius Junius Severianus, Galeonia Larga, and Publius Junius Novatus, in accordance with his mother's will.
- Publius Abudius Verus, made a first- or second-century offering at Parentium in memory of his son, also named Publius Abudius Verus.
- Publius Abudius P. f. Verus, the son of Publius Abudius Verus, who made a first- or second-century offering in memory of his son at Parentium .
- Titus Abudius Verus, an eques serving with the army at Ravenna during the first century, made an offering to Neptune.
- Marcus Abudius Vitalis, dedicated a third-century family sepulchre at Aquileia for his wife and their household.

== See also ==
- List of Roman gentes

== Bibliography ==
- Publius Cornelius Tacitus, Annales.
- Theodor Mommsen et alii, Corpus Inscriptionum Latinarum (The Body of Latin Inscriptions, abbreviated CIL), Berlin-Brandenburgische Akademie der Wissenschaften (1853–present).
- Gustav Wilmanns, Inscriptiones Africae Latinae (Latin Inscriptions from Africa), Georg Reimer, Berlin (1881).
- René Cagnat et alii, L'Année épigraphique (The Year in Epigraphy, abbreviated AE), Presses Universitaires de France (1888–present).
- Emile Espérandieu, Inscriptions Latines de Gaule: Narbonnaise, Paris (1929).
- Swedish Institute in Rome, Opuscula Archaeologica (1935–present).
- Anna Gerstl, Supplementum Epigraphicum zu CIL III für Kärnten und Osttirol, 1902-1961 (Epigraphic Supplement to CIL III for Carinthia and East Tyrol), Vienna (1961).
- Giovanni Battista Brusin, Inscriptiones Aquileiae (Inscriptions of Aquileia), Udine (1991–1993).
- Steven H. Rutledge, Imperial Inquisitions: Prosecutors and Informants from Tiberius to Domitian, Routledge (2002), ISBN 978-1-134-56060-8.
