= Sertoria gens =

Family in ancient Rome

The gens Sertoria was a minor plebeian family at ancient Rome. Few members of this gens appear in history, the most illustrious of whom was the Roman general Quintus Sertorius, who defied the dictator Sulla and his allies for a decade after the populares were driven from power in Rome.

== Origin ==
The nomen Sertorius is a patronymic surname, derived from the rare praenomen Sertor. Chase suggests that it was the equivalent of servator, meaning "one who protects" or "preserves".

== Praenomina ==
The Sertorii used a variety of common praenomina, including Gaius, Gnaeus, Lucius, Publius, Quintus, and Titus.

== Branches and cognomina ==
The Sertorii of the Republic were not divided into distinct families. The general Sertorius was born at Nursia, in Sabinum, where his family had lived for several generations. In imperial times there was a family bearing the cognomen Brocchus, originally referring to someone with prominent teeth.

== Members ==
This list includes abbreviated praenomina. For an explanation of this practice, see filiation.

- Quintus Sertorius, a celebrated general in the last decades of the Republic. He fought alongside Marius and Cinna, and later established an independent state in Hispania during the dictatorship of Sulla, but was finally murdered by one of his officers.
- Sertorius Severus, a man of praetorian rank, was named one of the heirs of Pomponia Galla, together with Pliny the Younger.
- Lucius Sertorius L. f. Sisenna, buried at Verona in Venetia and Histria, along with his wife, Terentia Maxima, with an altar dedicated by their sons, Lucius Sertorius Firmus and Quintus Sertorius Festus.
- Lucius Sertorius L. f. L. n. Firmus, the son of Lucius Sertorius Sisenna and Terentia Maxima, brother of Quintus Sertorius Festus, and husband of Domitia Prisca, was Aquilifer in the Legio XI Claudia, with whom he was buried at Verona in a tomb dating from the second half of the first century.
- Quintus Sertorius L. f. L. n. Festus, the son of Lucius Sertorius Sisenna and Terentia Maxima, and brother of Lucius Sertorius Firmus, was a centurion in the Legio XI Claudia. He was buried alongside his parents and brother at Verona, with a monument dating from the second half of the first century.
- Sertorius, the husband of Bibula, mentioned by Juvenal.
- Sertorius Clemens, a medical writer mentioned by Galen.
- Gaius Sertorius Cattianus, equestrian governor of Mauretania Tingitana around AD 200.

=== Sertorii Brocchi ===
- Gaius Sertorius Brocchus, proconsul of an uncertain province during the reign of Claudius.
- Gaius Sertorius Brocchus Quintus Servaeus Innocens, consul suffectus in AD 101.
- Gnaeus Sertorius C. f. Brocchus Aquilius Agricola Pedanius Fuscus Salinator Julius Servianus, named in an inscription from Doclea in Dalmatia.

== See also ==
- List of Roman gentes

== Bibliography ==
- Liber de Praenominibus, a short treatise of uncertain authorship, traditionally appended to Valerius Maximus' Factorum ac Dictorum Memorabilium (Memorable Facts and Sayings).
- Gaius Plinius Caecilius Secundus (Pliny the Younger), Epistulae (Letters).
- Decimus Junius Juvenalis, Satirae (Satires).
- Plutarchus, Lives of the Noble Greeks and Romans.
- Dictionary of Greek and Roman Biography and Mythology, William Smith, ed., Little, Brown and Company, Boston (1849).
- Theodor Mommsen et alii, Corpus Inscriptionum Latinarum (The Body of Latin Inscriptions, abbreviated CIL), Berlin-Brandenburgische Akademie der Wissenschaften (1853–present).
- George Davis Chase, "The Origin of Roman Praenomina", in Harvard Studies in Classical Philology, vol. VIII, pp. 103–184 (1897).
- Paul von Rohden, Elimar Klebs, & Hermann Dessau, Prosopographia Imperii Romani (The Prosopography of the Roman Empire, abbreviated PIR), Berlin (1898).
- J.E.H. Spaul, "Governors of Tingitana", in Antiquités Africaines, vol. 30 (1994).
