= Rullia gens =

Plebeian family at ancient Rome

The gens Rullia was an obscure plebeian family at ancient Rome. No members of this gens are mentioned in history, but a number are known from inscriptions.

== Origin ==
The nomen Rullius is derived from the cognomen Rullus, a beggar. The surname is better known in its derivative form, Rullianus, from Quintus Fabius Maximus Rullianus, one of the greatest statesmen and generals of the Roman Republic, who as a young man defied the orders of the dictator Lucius Papirius Cursor by engaging the enemy while his commander was away, winning a famous victory, but was then obliged to beg the Roman people to spare his life, when Cursor declared it forfeit. Chase classifies Rullius among those gentilicia that either originated at Rome, or cannot be shown to have come from anywhere else.

== Praenomina ==
The main praenomina of the Rulii were Gaius and Gnaeus, although there are also instances of Servius and Sextus. Servius was an uncommon name, although not especially rare; it tended to run in families. All of the others were quite common throughout Roman history.

== Members ==
This list includes abbreviated praenomina. For an explanation of this practice, see filiation.

- Rullia, named in an inscription from Tusculum in Latium.
- Alaucus Rullius, probably a slave, named in an inscription Canusium in Apulia.
- Servius Rullius C. s., a slave named in an inscription from Canusium.
- Rullia Ɔ. l. Adepta, a freedwoman, built a tomb at Casilinum in Campania for herself, her husband, Publius Brittius Epicius, and Gaius Rullius Communis, dating to the first half of the first century AD.
- Rullia Agathe, buried at Rome, with a monument from her husband, Gaius Rullius Felix.
- Gnaeus Rullius Calais, one of the Seviri Augustales at Aesernia in Samnium, where he built a tomb for himself and his wife, Maria, the slave of Corinthidius.
- Gnaeus Rullius Ɔ. l. Ceramylla, a freedman buried at Rome, together with Rullia Proposis.
- Gaius Rullius Ɔ. l. Communis, a freedman buried at Casilinum, in a tomb built by Rullia Adepta.
- Gaius Rullius Felix, dedicated a tomb at Rome to his wife, Rullia Agathe.
- Gnaeus Rullius Felix, named among the members of one of the artisanal guilds at Ostia in AD 173.
- Rullia Sp. f. Galla, buried at Aquileia in Venetia and Histria, in a tomb built by Lucius Cluvius Ingenuus, perhaps her husband.
- Rullia Inventa, aged twenty, buried at Rome during the second century AD, with a tomb dedicated by her husband, Gaius Arminius Hermes.
- Rullius Lysimachus, named in an inscription from Canusium in Apulia.
- Rullia C. f. Maximilla, one of the children of Gaius Rullius Maximus, who dedicated a tomb to their father at Vibinum in Apulia.
- Rullius C. f. Maximus, one of the children of Gaius Rullius Maximus, who dedicated a tomb to their father at Vibinum.
- Gaius Rullius Maximus, one of the municipal duumvirs at Vibinum, where he was buried with a tomb dedicated by his children, Maximus, Priscus, and Maximilla.
- Rullius Princeps, named in an inscription from Rome, dating to the first half of the first century AD.
- Rullius C. f. Priscus, one of the children of Gaius Rullius Maximus, who dedicated a tomb to their father at Vibinum.
- Sextus Rullius Ɔ. l. Princeps, a freedman, built a tomb at Rome for himself and his family.
- Rullia Cn. l. Proposis, a freedwoman buried at Rome, together with Gnaeus Rullius Ceramylla.
- Gaius Rullius Sp. f. Rufus, named in an inscription from Atina in Latium.
- Rullia Vitalis, together with Maniaca Ursilla and Flavius Niceros, dedicated a late second century tomb at Rome to Ursilla's son, Quintus Vibulenus Arruntianus, a soldier in the fourth cohort of the vigiles at Rome, aged twenty-one, having served in the vigiles for five years and two months.

== See also ==
- List of Roman gentes

== Bibliography ==
- Titus Livius (Livy), History of Rome.
- Theodor Mommsen et alii, Corpus Inscriptionum Latinarum (The Body of Latin Inscriptions, abbreviated CIL), Berlin-Brandenburgische Akademie der Wissenschaften (1853–present).
- Bullettino della Commissione Archeologica Comunale in Roma (Bulletin of the Municipal Archaeological Commission of Rome, abbreviated BCAR), (1872–present).
- René Cagnat et alii, L'Année épigraphique (The Year in Epigraphy, abbreviated AE), Presses Universitaires de France (1888–present).
- George Davis Chase, "The Origin of Roman Praenomina", in Harvard Studies in Classical Philology, vol. VIII, pp. 103–184 (1897).
- Francesco Grelle, Mario Pani, Le Epigrafi Romane di Canosa (The Roman Epigraphy of Canusium), Edipuglia, Bari (1985, 1990).
- Gian Luca Gregori, La collezione epigrafica dell'antiquarium comunale del Celio (The Epigraphic Collection of the Ancient Community of the Caelian Hill), Quasar, Rome (2001).
