= Opsia gens =

Ancient Roman family

The gens Opsia was a minor plebeian family at ancient Rome. Members of this gens first appear in history during the reign of Tiberius. The most notable may have been Marcus Opsius Navius Fannianus, who filled a number of important posts, rising to the rank of praetor. Many other Opsii are known from inscriptions.

== Origin ==
The root of the nomen Opsius appears to be op-, with the meaning of "help", found in the name of the goddess Ops, as well as the nomen Oppius. The same root may be the source of the praenomen Opiter, together with the patronymic surnames derived from it, Opiternius and Opetreius. Such forms are typical of non-Latin gentilicia, and are most likely of Sabine origin, which seems the more probable in light of the tradition that the cult of Ops was introduced to Rome by the Sabine king, Titus Tatius. Opsius in turn appears to have given rise to two later gentilicia, Opsidius and Opsilius, which used the suffixes -idius and -ilius to form new nomina from an existing name.

== Praenomina ==
Nearly all of the Opsii known from various sources bear the praenomina Marcus or Gaius, two of the most common names. There are also a few Opsii named Publius and Gnaeus, which were likewise quite common.

== Members ==
This list includes abbreviated praenomina. For an explanation of this practice, see filiation.

- Marcus Opsius, a former praetor, was one of those who encouraged Titius Sabinus to denounce the government of Tiberius in AD 28, so that they could betray Sabinus to Sejanus, and win political favour for themselves. He might be the same person as Fannianus.
- Marcus Opsius Navius Fannianus, served at various times as decemvir stlitibus iudicandis, (Note: A committee of ten for adjudicating lawsuits.) tribune of the fifth legion, quaestor of Bithynia and Pontus, aedile, praefectus frumenti dandi, (Note: Prefect for distributing grain to the poor.) and praetor.
- Opsia, a freedwoman named in an inscription from Cales in Campania.
- Gaius Opsius, named in an inscription from Ateste in the province of Venetia et Histria.
- Gaius Opsius, a soldier mentioned in a list from Herculaneum.
- Gaius Opsius C. f., one of the magistri pagi at Furfo in Samnium.
- Gnaeus Opsius Amandus, named in an inscription from Rome.
- Gaius Opsius C. l. Amerimnus, a freedman named in a list of soldiers at Herculaneum.
- Marcus Opsius M. l. Anteros, a freedman named in an inscription from Rome.
- Opsia Araba, built a tomb for herself and her mother at Cales.
- Opsia M. l. Calliste, a freedwoman, named in an inscription from Rome.
- Publius Opsius P. l. Calvius, named in a dedicatory inscription from Ateste.
- Opsia M. l. Calybeni, named in an inscription from Rome.
- Marcus Opsius Cladus, named in an inscription from Rome.
- Gaius Opsius C. l. Gorgia, a freedman named in a list of soldiers at Herculaneum.
- Marcus Opsius M. l. Midas, a freedman named in an inscription from Rome.
- Marcus Opsius Moschus, buried at Rome, aged five.
- Gaius Opsius Optatus, named in a dedicatory inscription from Grumentum in Lucania.
- Marcus Opsius M. l. Pamphilus, a freedman named in an inscription from Rome.
- Marcus Opsius Philadespotus, named in an inscription from Rome.
- Marcus Opsius M. l. Philargurus, a freedman named in an inscription from Rome.
- Gaius Opsius Scymnus, the husband of Helvia Fausta, and father of Helvia Scymnis, buried at Corfinium in Samnium.
- Publius Opsius Severus, husband of Arria Marcellina, buried at Rome.
- Marcus Opsius Speratus, named in a funerary inscription from Rome.
- Marcus Opsius M. f. Silvester, a soldier from Capua, serving in the twelfth urban cohort, named in an inscription from Rome dating to AD 197.
- Gaius Opsius Staphylus, named in two inscriptions from Herculaneum.
- Marcus Opsius M. l. Stratax, husband of Tituleia Arbuscula, buried at Venusia in Samnium.

== See also ==
- List of Roman gentes

== Bibliography ==
- Publius Cornelius Tacitus, Annales.
- Dictionary of Greek and Roman Biography and Mythology, William Smith, ed., Little, Brown and Company, Boston (1849).
- Theodor Mommsen et alii, Corpus Inscriptionum Latinarum (The Body of Latin Inscriptions, abbreviated CIL), Berlin-Brandenburgische Akademie der Wissenschaften (1853–present).
- Wilhelm Henzen, Ephemeris Epigraphica: Corporis Inscriptionum Latinarum Supplementum (Journal of Inscriptions: Supplement to the Corpus Inscriptionum Latinarum, abbreviated EE), Institute of Roman Archaeology, Rome (1872–1913).
- Ettore Pais, Corporis inscriptionum Latinarum supplementa Italica (Italian Supplement to the Corpus Inscriptionum Latinarum), Rome (1884).
- René Cagnat et alii, L'Année épigraphique (The Year in Epigraphy, abbreviated AE), Presses Universitaires de France (1888–present).
- George Davis Chase, "The Origin of Roman Praenomina", in Harvard Studies in Classical Philology, vol. VIII (1897).
