= Opsilia gens =

Ancient Roman family

The gens Opsilia was an obscure plebeian family at Rome. No members of this gens are known to have held any magistracies, but several are found in inscriptions.

== Origin ==
The nomen Opsilius belongs to a class of gentilicia formed from other names using the suffix -ilius. In this case the nomen is derived from the more common Opsius; the same nomen also gives rise to the gens Opsidia or Obsidia. The common root of all three nomina is op-, "help", found in the name of the goddess Ops, as well as the praenomen Opiter, and the derived patronymics Opiternius and Opetreius, and the nomen Oppius. Most of these names are thought to be of Sabine or Samnite origin.

== Members ==
This list includes abbreviated praenomina. For an explanation of this practice, see filiation.

- Opsilia, built a tomb at Tusculum for her husband Marcus Coelius Vinicianus, a former praetor and tribune of the plebs.
- Opsilius, centurion in a cohort of soldiers stationed at the present site of Gilsland, then in the province of Britannia.
- Marcus Opsilius M. f., buried at Fanum Fortunae in Umbria.
- Publius Opsilius P. l. Alexas, a freedman named in a dedicatory inscription from Rome.
- Opsilius Conius, buried at Carales in Sardinia, aged thirty. His wife built a tomb for him, dating to between AD 201 and 230.
- Sextus Opsilius Geminus, named in a libationary inscription found at Roermond, formerly part of Germania Inferior.
- Marcus Opsilius M. l. Midas, a freedman named in an inscription from Rome.
- Lucius Opsilius L. l. Pamphilus, a freedman mentioned in an inscription from Rome, under the names of the consuls of AD 5.
- Titus Opsilius Saturninus, named in a dedicatory inscription from Rome.
- Opsilia Tyche, named in a dedicatory inscription from Rome.

== See also ==
- List of Roman gentes

== Bibliography ==
- Theodor Mommsen et alii, Corpus Inscriptionum Latinarum (The Body of Latin Inscriptions, abbreviated CIL), Berlin-Brandenburgische Akademie der Wissenschaften (1853–present).
- René Cagnat et alii, L'Année épigraphique (The Year in Epigraphy, abbreviated AE), Presses Universitaires de France (1888–present).
- The Roman Inscriptions of Britain (abbreviated RIB), Oxford, (1990–present).
- Andreas Kakoschke, Ortsfremde in den römischen Provinzen Germania inferior und Germania superior (Foreigners in the Roman Provinces of Germania Inferior and Germania Superior), Möhnesee (2002).
- Antonio M. Corda, Concordanze delle iscrizioni latine della Sardegna (Concordance of the Latin Inscriptions of Sardinia, abbreviated SRD), Ortacesus (2014).
