= Varisidia gens =

Ancient Roman family

The gens Varisidia, occasionally written Varesidia, was an obscure plebeian family of ancient Rome. Hardly any members of this gens are mentioned by Roman writers, but a number are known from inscriptions.

== Origin ==
The nomen Varisidius belongs to a class of gentilicia formed using the suffix -idius, originally formed from adjectives or cognomina ending in -idus, in which case the root would probably have been Varisidus. But like a number of other formations, -idius came to be regarded as a regular gentile-forming suffix, and was used without respect to morphology, in which case the root may be a name such as Varus, "knock-kneed". Several early Varisidii came from towns in Umbria, which may be the family's place of origin.

== Praenomina ==
Most of the Varisidii bear extremely common praenomina, including Gaius, Lucius, Marcus, Publius, and Quintus. Besides these, an inscription from Urvinum Mataurense in Umbria provides examples of the rare praenomen Sertor, and the feminine praenomen Tertia.

== Members ==
This list includes abbreviated praenomina. For an explanation of this practice, see filiation.

- Sertor Varisidius, the father of Tertia Varisidia, a woman buried in a first-century BC tomb at Urvinum Mataurense in Umbria.
- Tertia Varisidia Sert. f., buried in a first-century BC tomb at Urvinum Mataurense.
- Marcus Varisidius, an eques whom Lucius Munatius Plancus despatched to Cicero in 43 BC, so as to better inform Cicero of his actions in support of the Republic.
- Gaius Varisidius, named on a label from Tuder in Umbria, dating from the Augustan era.
- Varisidia C. f. Maxuma, the wife of Lucius Cornelius, and mother of Cornelia. Her husband built a tomb for her at Libisosa in Hispania Citerior, dating from the Julio-Claudian Dynasty, stating that she had been "stolen by the cruel Fates".
- Lucius Varisidius L. l., a freedman buried at Rome, in a tomb built by the freedwoman Varesidia Eubola, dating from the first half of the first century.
- Varesidia L. l. Eubola, a freedwoman, built a tomb at Rome, dating from the first half of the first century, for the freedman Lucius Varisidius.
- Quintus Varisidius Q. f. Naso, a purpurarius, or dyer in Tyrian purple, buried at Pollentia in Liguria in a tomb dating from the first half of the first century.
- Varisidi[...], buried at Libisosa, in a tomb dating from the early or middle first century.
- Varisidius Nepos, a nephew of Gaius Calvisius Rufus, one of Pliny the Younger's friends. At his request, Nepos was appointed a military tribune by Quintus Sosius Senecio.
- Gaius Varisidius C. f., buried at Novaria in Gallia Narbonensis, in a tomb built by his sister, Magia, dating from the first half of the second century.
- Varisidius Icelus, the patron of Parmensis, named in a second-century inscription from Telesia in Samnium.
- Publius Varisidius L. l. Sabinus, a freedman, and one of the seviri Augustales, was buried in a second-century tomb at Novaria, along with a woman named Tisi[...].
- Varesidius Rusticus, a freedman buried in a fourth- or fifth-century Christian tomb at Rome.

=== Undated Varisidii ===
- Varesidia Ampelis, buried at Rome, in a tomb built by Lusianus.
- Publius Varisidius Hostus, the father of Epo, Buquorsa, and Adnomatus, who were buried at Emona in Pannonia Superior, in a tomb built by their brother, Ingenuus.
- Marcus Varisidius M. l. Trophimus, a freedman mentioned in an inscription from Andros in Achaia.

== See also ==
- List of Roman gentes

== Bibliography ==
- Marcus Tullius Cicero, Epistulae ad Familiares.
- Gaius Plinius Caecilius Secundus (Pliny the Younger), Epistulae (Letters).
- René Cagnat et alii, L'Année épigraphique (The Year in Epigraphy, abbreviated AE), Presses Universitaires de France (1888–present).
- George Davis Chase, "The Origin of Roman Praenomina", in Harvard Studies in Classical Philology, vol. VIII, pp. 103–184 (1897).
- Dictionary of Greek and Roman Biography and Mythology, William Smith, ed., Little, Brown and Company, Boston (1849).
- Inscriptiones Christianae Urbis Romae (Christian Inscriptions from the City of Rome, abbreviated ICUR), New Series, Rome (1922–present).
- Theodor Mommsen et alii, Corpus Inscriptionum Latinarum (The Body of Latin Inscriptions, abbreviated CIL), Berlin-Brandenburgische Akademie der Wissenschaften (1853–present).
- Paul von Rohden, Elimar Klebs, & Hermann Dessau, Prosopographia Imperii Romani (The Prosopography of the Roman Empire, abbreviated PIR), Berlin (1898).
