= Spurilia gens =

Ancient Roman family

The gens Spurilia, sometimes spelled Spurillia, was an obscure plebeian family at ancient Rome. Hardly any members of this gens are mentioned by ancient writers, for the Spurilius mentioned in some manuscripts of Livy as tribune of the plebs in 422 BC is amended by some authorities to "Spurius Icilius", while it is uncertain whether the moneyer who issued denarii in 139 BC was named Spurius, Spurilius, or Spurinna. Nevertheless, a number of Spurilii are known from inscriptions.

== Origin ==
The nomen Spurilius is formed from the praenomen Spurius, using the diminutive suffix -ilius, which was frequently used to form new gentilicia from existing names. Spurius was a common name in the early period of Roman history, and favoured by a number of prominent families, but became scarcer toward the end of the Republic, probably due to confusion with the adjective spurius, "illegitimate". The origin and meaning of Spurius is uncertain, but Deecke proposes that the name is of Etruscan derivation, and might have meant something akin to "city dweller", being synonymous with the Latin praenomen Publius.

== Praenomina ==
The main praenomina of the Spurilii were Gaius, Lucius, and Marcus, the three most common names at all periods of Roman history. Aulus and Tiberius represent early, but very uncertain cases, since the individuals bearing them may not actually have belonged to the Spurilia gens.

== Members ==
This list includes abbreviated praenomina. For an explanation of this practice, see filiation.

- Tiberius Spurilius or Spurillius, amended by some authorities to Spurius Icilius, was a cavalry commander under the consul Gaius Sempronius Atratinus in 423 BC. As Sempronius was threatened with prosecution for his conduct of the war against the Volsci, Spurilius and three of his brothers-in-arms, Tiberius Antistius, Marcus Asellius, and Sextus Tempanius, were elected tribune of the plebs for the following year, in order to protect Sempronius. (Note: Sempronius was finally brought to trial, convicted, and fined in 420 BC.)
- Aulus Spurilius, minted denarii in 139 BC, featuring the head of Roma on the obverse, and on the reverse Luna driving a biga. His nomen is uncertain, and might instead by Spurius or Spurinna.
- Lucius Spurilius L. f., buried at Tarquinii in Etruria, aged sixty-five, in a tomb dating to the last quarter of the second century BC.
- Gaius Spurilius M. f., one of the quattuorviri at Falerii in Etruria, had also been quaestor.
- Marcus Spurilius C. f., mentioned in an inscription from Falerii, dating to the first half of the first century, had been quaestor twice, and duumvir.
- Publius Spurilius Ampliatus, dedicated a second-century tomb at Ameria in Umbria for his old nurse, Spurilia Hypate.
- Spurilia Deutera, dedicated a monument at Rome for her father, Gaius Spurilius Soter.
- Gaius Spurilius Fortunatus, one of the Seviri Augustales at Ameria, made an offering to Mercury.
- Gaius Spurilius C. l. Hermaiscus, a freedman at Rome, who together with Attia Nice and Gaius Vet[...], are recorded making a gift of three pots, some time in the first half of the first century.
- Spurilia Hypate, the nurse of Publius Spurilius Ampliatus, who built a second-century tomb at Ameria for her.
- Lucius Spurilius Hypnus, named in a sepulchral inscription from Rome, dating to the first half of the first century.
- Spurillia Myrtis, named in an inscription from Ostia in Latium.
- Spurilia C. f. Naïs, buried at Ameria, aged eight months, twenty-two days, in a tomb dedicated by her parents, Gaius Spurilius Secundus and Roscia Euterpe, and dating to the second half of the first century.
- Marsa Spurilia Nica, named in a sepulchral inscription from Ameria, dating to the end of the first century BC, or the beginning of the first century AD.
- Spurilia Primitiva, buried a Rome, with a monument from her husband, Caecilius Apollonius.
- Gaius Spurilius Secundus, along with his wife, Roscia Euterpe, dedicated a tomb for their infant daughter, Spurilia Naïs, at Ameria, during the latter half of the first century.
- Gaius Spurilius Soter, buried at Rome, with a monument from his daughter, Spurilia Deutera.

== See also ==
- List of Roman gentes

== Bibliography ==
- Titus Livius (Livy), History of Rome.
- Joseph Hilarius Eckhel, Doctrina Numorum Veterum (The Study of Ancient Coins, 1792–1798).
- Dictionary of Greek and Roman Biography and Mythology, William Smith, ed., Little, Brown and Company, Boston (1849).
- Theodor Mommsen et alii, Corpus Inscriptionum Latinarum (The Body of Latin Inscriptions, abbreviated CIL), Berlin-Brandenburgische Akademie der Wissenschaften (1853–present).
- Wilhelm Deecke, "Der Dativ Larθiale und der Stammerweiterung auf -ali" ("The Dative Larθiale and the Extension of Stems with -ali"), in Etruskische Forschungen und Studien (Etruscan Research and Studies), Albert Heitz, Stuttgart, vol. II (1882).
- René Cagnat et alii, L'Année épigraphique (The Year in Epigraphy, abbreviated AE), Presses Universitaires de France (1888–present).
- August Pauly, Georg Wissowa, et alii, Realencyclopädie der Classischen Altertumswissenschaft (Scientific Encyclopedia of the Knowledge of Classical Antiquities, abbreviated RE or PW), J. B. Metzler, Stuttgart (1894–1980).
- George Davis Chase, "The Origin of Roman Praenomina", in Harvard Studies in Classical Philology, vol. VIII, pp. 103–184 (1897).
- T. Robert S. Broughton, The Magistrates of the Roman Republic, American Philological Association (1952–1986).
- Michael Crawford, Roman Republican Coinage, Cambridge University Press (1974, 2001).
