= Postumulena gens =

Ancient Roman family

The gens Postumulena was an obscure plebeian family at ancient Rome. Few members of this gens are mentioned in history, but others are known from inscriptions.

== Origin ==
The nomen Postumulenus belongs to a class of names formed primarily from other gentilicia, using the suffix -enus. In this case, the nomen is a lengthened form of Postumius, derived from the old Latin praenomen Postumus. This name is derived from the adjective postremus, "hindmost" or "last", and originally referred to a last-born child, although in later times it was confused with posthumus, "after burial", being applied to children born after their fathers' death.

== Praenomina ==
The only praenomina associated with the Postumuleni are Lucius, Marcus, and Gaius, the three most common names throughout Roman history, and perhaps Publius, known from a filiation, and also very common.

== Members ==
This list includes abbreviated praenomina. For an explanation of this practice, see filiation.

- Postumulenus, mentioned by Cicero as a friend of someone named Trebianus or Trebonius.
- Marcus Postumulenus, the freedman of Jucundus, buried at Carthage in Africa Proconsularis.
- Postumulena P. l. Agapema, buried at Trebula Mutusca in Sabinum.
- Postumulenus Atimetus, patron of Postumulena Symmone, who built a tomb for him at Ostia in Latium.
- Postumulena Chara, wife of Lucius Postumulenus Thalamus, who built a tomb for himself and his wife at Portus in Latium.
- Marcus Postumulenus Fidelis, built a tomb at Rome for his nephew, Marcus Memmius Rufus, aged five years, three months, and eleven days.
- Postumulena C. f. Ingenua, daughter of Gaius Postumulenus Ingenuus and Tuccia Trophime.
- Gaius Postumulenus Ingenuus, husband of Tuccia Trophime, and father of Postumulena Ingenua, buried with his wife at Rome.
- Lucius Postumulenus L. Ɔ. l. Mama, a freedman buried at Rome.
- Lucius Postumulenus Nicephorus, husband of Nonia Verecunda, and father of Sotidia Maxima, buried in a family sepulchre at Canusium in Apulia, dating to the first or second centuries AD.
- Gaius Postumulenus Paullus, named in an inscription from Narnia in Umbria.
- Lucius Postumulenus Primitivus, husband of Curtilia Glyconis, who dedicated a tomb for him at Rome.
- Postumulena Ɔ. l. Rufa, a freedwoman buried at Rome.
- Postumulena L. f. Sabina, buried at Ateste in Venetia and Histria.
- Marcus Postumulenus Secundus, a soldier serving in the century of Decimus Roetius Secundus at Rome in AD 70.
- Postumulena Symmone, client of Postumulenus Atimetus, for whom she built a tomb at Ostia.
- Lucius Postumulenus Thalamus, built a tomb at Portus for himself and his wife, Postumulena Chara.
- Postumulena Ɔ. l. Vitalis, buried at Ateste.

== See also ==
- List of Roman gentes

== Bibliography ==
- Marcus Tullius Cicero, Epistulae ad Familiares.
- Dictionary of Greek and Roman Biography and Mythology, William Smith, ed., Little, Brown and Company, Boston (1849).
- Theodor Mommsen et alii, Corpus Inscriptionum Latinarum (The Body of Latin Inscriptions, abbreviated CIL), Berlin-Brandenburgische Akademie der Wissenschaften (1853–present).
- Notizie degli Scavi di Antichità (News of Excavations from Antiquity, abbreviated NSA), Accademia dei Lincei (1876–present).
- Bulletin Archéologique du Comité des Travaux Historiques et Scientifiques (Archaeological Bulletin of the Committee on Historic and Scientific Works, abbreviated BCTH), Imprimerie Nationale, Paris (1885–1973).
- René Cagnat et alii, L'Année épigraphique (The Year in Epigraphy, abbreviated AE), Presses Universitaires de France (1888–present).
- George Davis Chase, "The Origin of Roman Praenomina", in Harvard Studies in Classical Philology, vol. VIII (1897).
