= Septimuleia gens =

Ancient Roman family

The gens Septimuleia or Septumuleia was an obscure plebeian family at ancient Rome. Few members of this gens are mentioned in ancient writers, but others are known from inscriptions. The nomen might be confused with, and may be identical to that of Septimulenus or Septumulenus.

== Origin ==
The nomen Septimuleius belongs to a large class of gentilicia, typically of Oscan origin, ending in the gentile-forming suffix -eius. This may mean that the Septimuleii were of Sabine or Samnite origin. The root resembles that of the rare Latin praenomen Septimus, from the Latin numeral for "seven", referring to a seventh son, seventh child, or a child born in September, the seventh month of the old Roman calendar. In this case, Septimuleius might be cognate with the patronymic nomen Septimius. The suffix -enus was typically associated with gentes from Picenum and neighboring regions, which would be consistent with an Oscan or Umbrian origin.

== Members ==
This list includes abbreviated praenomina. For an explanation of this practice, see filiation.

- Lucius Septimuleius, a native of Anagnia in Latium, and a friend of Gaius Gracchus, nonetheless claimed the reward for his friend's head, which he presented to the consul Lucius Opimius after Gracchus' murder in 121 BC. According to different versions of the story, the reward was the weight of the head in gold, and Septimuleius either filled Gracchus' mouth with lead, or replaced his brain with lead; but he was denied his bounty when the head was found to weigh seventeen and two thirds pounds.
- Gaius Septumuleius C. f. Obola, one of the quattuorviri at Aesernia in Samnium, where he was buried at some point between the late first century BC, and the middle of the first century AD.
- Septimuleia, the mother of Juvenal, according to the Vita Juvenalis.
- Septimuleia, the sister of Juvenal, married a man named "Fuscinus".
- Septimuleius Apella, buried at Rome, with a monument from his son, Septimuleius Restitutus.
- Decimus Septumuleius D. l. Athenio, a freedman and priest of the Imperial cult at Nola in Campania between AD 1 and 70, mentioned in an inscription along with Decimus Septumuleius Atticus and Septumuleia Daphne.
- Decimus Septumuleius D. l. Atticus, a freedman and priest of the Imperial Cult at Nola during the early or middle part of the first century, mentioned in an inscription along with Decimus Septumuleius Athenio and Septumuleia Daphne.
- Septumuleia D. l. Daphne, a freedwoman at Nola during the early or middle part of the first century, mentioned in an inscription along with the priests Decimus Septumuleius Athenio and Decimus Septumuleius Atticus.
- Lucius Septumuleius Sp. f., a little boy buried at Rome, aged three, at some point in the first century.
- Septimuleia Primigenia, a woman buried at Rusicade in Numidia, aged fifty-five.
- Septimuleius Restitutus, dedicated a tomb at Rome for his father, Septimuleius Apella.

=== Septimuleni ===
- Titus Septumulenus T. f., made an offering to Hercules at Tarentum in Calabria, between 110 and 90 BC.
- Lucius Septimulenus Vitalis, one of the Seviri Augustales at Narona in Dalmatia, at some point between the death of Augustus and the middle of the second century.

== See also ==
- List of Roman gentes

== Bibliography ==
- Marcus Tullius Cicero, De Oratore.
- Valerius Maximus, Factorum ac Dictorum Memorabilium (Memorable Facts and Sayings).
- Gaius Plinius Secundus (Pliny the Elder), Historia Naturalis (Natural History).
- Lucius Mestrius Plutarchus (Plutarch), Lives of the Noble Greeks and Romans.
- Dictionary of Greek and Roman Biography and Mythology, William Smith, ed., Little, Brown and Company, Boston (1849).
- Theodor Mommsen et alii, Corpus Inscriptionum Latinarum (The Body of Latin Inscriptions, abbreviated CIL), Berlin-Brandenburgische Akademie der Wissenschaften (1853–present).
- René Cagnat et alii, L'Année épigraphique (The Year in Epigraphy, abbreviated AE), Presses Universitaires de France (1888–present).
- George Davis Chase, "The Origin of Roman Praenomina", in Harvard Studies in Classical Philology, vol. VIII, pp. 103–184 (1897).
- Paul von Rohden, Elimar Klebs, & Hermann Dessau, Prosopographia Imperii Romani (The Prosopography of the Roman Empire, abbreviated PIR), Berlin (1898).
