= Tullus (praenomen) =

Tullus (/ˈtʊləs/ or rarely /ˈtʌləs/) is a Latin praenomen, or personal name, which was used from the earliest times to the end of the Roman Republic. Although never particularly common, the name gave rise to the patronymic gens Tullia, and it may have been used as a cognomen by families that had formerly used the name. The feminine form is Tulla. The name is not usually abbreviated, but is sometimes found with the abbreviation Tul.

The praenomen Tullus is best known from Tullus Hostilius, the third king of Rome. Other examples include Attius Tullus, a Volscian leader, in which Tullus is either a cognomen or an inverted praenomen; Tullus Cloelius, a Roman envoy, Tullus Cluvius, mentioned by the orator Marcus Tullius Cicero in the 1st century BC, and a father and son from gens Tullia who lived at Tibur. Writing at the time of Cicero, the scholar Marcus Terentius Varro listed Tullus amongst several praenomina that he considered obsolete, although the foregoing examples show that it was still in limited use.

== Origin and meaning ==
Tullus appears to be a Latin name, as most of the families in which it occurs are of Latin origin, but the name may also have been common to the Oscan and Umbrian languages, as evidenced by the Volscian leader, Attius Tullus. The name seems to have confused some Latin writers, including the historian Titus Livius, who wavered between regarding it as praenomen or cognomen. Livius gives the forms Attius Tullus and Cloelius Tullus (with no praenomen), while Gaius Plinius Secundus gives Tullus Cloelius, which is probably correct.

The meaning of the praenomen is unclear. Chase hypothesizes that it could be derived from an archaic word meaning "people", in which case it might have a similar meaning to the praenomen Publius, but ultimately he concludes that it is more likely a diminutive of a word meaning "one who supports". This would give it a similar meaning to the possible praenomen Fertor, found in a single inscription of gens Resia, although that may be a mistake for (or variation of) the praenomen Sertor.
