= Opetreia gens =

Ancient Roman family

The gens Opetreia was a plebeian family at ancient Rome. No members of this gens are known to have held any important magistracies, but a number of them are found in inscriptions. (Note: Occasionally as Opitreia and Opetria.)

== Origin ==
The nomen Opetreius appears to be a patronymic surname based on the ancient praenomen Opiter, best known as a result of its use by the gentes Verginia and Lucretia during the early Republic. The nomen Opiternius is derived from the same praenomen, and both are probably related to other gentilicia, including Oppius and Opsius. The name may be grouped with a large class of nomina, many of which are of Sabine or Oscan origin, formed from other names using the suffix -eius.

== Praenomina ==
Publius, Gaius, Lucius, and Gnaeus appear to have been the chief praenomina of the Opetrei. All of these were very common names throughout Roman history. An inscription from Noricum mentions a Decimus Opetrius; this would be a much more distinctive praenomen, but from the limited number of individuals, it is impossible to say if it was regularly used by the gens.

== Members ==
This list includes abbreviated praenomina. For an explanation of this practice, see filiation.

- Decimus Opetrius, named in an inscription from Aguntum in Noricum.
- Gaius Opetreius, buried at Philippi in Macedonia.
- Publius Opetreius, named in a list of members of the carpenters' guild at Rome.
- Publius Opetreius, dedicated a monument at Rome to his son, Publius.
- Publius Opetreius P. f., buried at Rome, aged [...] years, eight months, and twenty-eight days.
- Opetreia Asclepias, wife of Publius Aelius Hermeros, buried at Rome.
- Publius Opetreius Augustalis, a child buried at Rome, aged two years, three months.
- Publius Opitreius Butas, buried at Rome in 48 BC.
- Gnaeus Opetreius Carpus, a freedman buried at Rome.
- Lucius Opetreius L. l. Dionysius, a freedman buried at Rome, and the husband of Opetreia Prima.
- Publius Opetreius Epaphroditus, the husband of Vigellia Calliste, buried at Rome, aged forty-five.
- Gnaeus Opetreius Eros, named in an inscription from Rome.
- Opetreia Haline, named in an inscription from Rome.
- Opetreia Hilara, a freedwoman buried at Rome.
- Gnaeus Opetreius Hilarus, a freedman buried at Rome.
- Publius Opetreius Hilarus Eubulus, one of the sexviri (Note: A commission of six men; the surviving portion of the inscription does not identify the commission's function.) at Frusino in Latium.
- Gaius Opetreius C. l. Hyginus, a freedman buried at Rome.
- Gaius Opetreius Januarius, husband of Sulpicia Postumia, buried at Rome, aged fifty-two.
- Lucius Opetreius Januarius, named in a list of soldiers at Rome, dating from AD 70.
- Gnaeus Opetreius Cn. l. Menogenes, a freedman buried at Rome.
- Opetreia Musa, buried at Rome, aged thirteen.
- Opetreia C. f. Paulla, buried at Beneventum in Samnium
- Gaius Opetrius Philetus, named in a libationary inscription from Julia Concordia in the province of Venetia et Histria.
- Publius Opetreius P. l. Philotaerus, a freedman, named in an inscription from Rome.
- Gaius Opetreius Plistus, named in an inscription from Pompeii.
- Opetreia C. C. l. Prima, a freedwoman, built a monument at Rome for herself and her husband, Lucius Opetreius Dionysus, at the cost of 12,500 sestertii.
- Publius Opetreius Pullus, named in an inscription from Pompeii.
- Opetreia Salva, buried at Philippi.
- Opetreia P. l. Secunda, a freedwoman, named in an inscription from Rome.
- Opetreia Cn. l. Selenio, a freedwoman buried at Rome.
- Opetreia C. l. Tima, named in an inscription from Rome.
- Opetreia P. l. Thetis, a freedwoman named in two inscriptions from Aquinum in Latium.
- Opetreia Trophime, dedicated a monument at Rome to her husband, Lucius Annius Asticus.

== See also ==
- List of Roman gentes

== Bibliography ==
- Dictionary of Greek and Roman Biography and Mythology, William Smith, ed., Little, Brown and Company, Boston (1849).
- Theodor Mommsen et alii, Corpus Inscriptionum Latinarum (The Body of Latin Inscriptions, abbreviated CIL), Berlin-Brandenburgische Akademie der Wissenschaften (1853–present).
- Bullettino della Commissione Archeologica Comunale in Roma (Bulletin of the Municipal Archaeological Commission of Rome, abbreviated BCAR), (1872–present).
- Notizie degli Scavi di Antichità (News of Excavations from Antiquity, abbreviated NSA), Accademia dei Lincei (1876–present).
- René Cagnat et alii, L'Année épigraphique (The Year in Epigraphy, abbreviated AE), Presses Universitaires de France (1888–present).
- George Davis Chase, "The Origin of Roman Praenomina", in Harvard Studies in Classical Philology, vol. VIII (1897).
- Annona Epigraphica Austriaca (Epigraphy of Austria Annual, abbreviated AEA) (1979–present).
