= Nonius =

Nonius can refer to:

== People ==
- Romans belonging to the Nonia gens
- Nonius Marcellus, a Roman grammarian of the 4th or 5th century AD
- Pedro Nunes (Latin: Petrus Nonius) (1502–1578), Portuguese astronomer and mathematician

== Other ==
- Nonius (horse), a breed of horse
- Nonius (device), a precursor to the Vernier scale
- Nonius (crater), a lunar crater

== See also ==
- Nonus
- Nonnus
