= Nonnus (disambiguation) =

Nonnus (Ancient Greek: Νόννος, Nónnos) usually refers to Nonnus of Panopolis, a Hellenized Egyptian who wrote the longest-surviving epic poem from antiquity, the Dionysiaca.

Nonnus may also refer to:

- Nonnus (wasp), a genus of wasps
- St Nonnus, a probably legendary Syrian bishop from the hagiography of St Pelagia
- Nonnus of Edessa, bishop, frequently but probably mistakenly conflated with St Nonnus and with Nonnus of Panopolis
- Nonnus of Zerabenna, bishop
- Nonnus (historian) (6th-century), better known as Nonnosus
- Theophanes Nonnus, a 10th-century Byzantine physician
- Pseudo-Nonnus also called Nonnus Abbas (i.e. "Nonnus the Abbot"), a 6th-century AD commentator on Gregory Nazianzen

== See also ==
- Nonus
- Nonius
- Nonnosus
