= Mimesia gens =

Ancient Roman family

The gens Mimesia was an obscure Roman family, known almost entirely from a famous inscription on the cistern at the Cathedral of San Rufino in Assisi, dating to the first century BC. Two members of the Mimesia gens are named among six men who built the walls surrounding the cistern, pursuant to a decree of the Roman Senate, and under the supervision of the town magistrates. Their filiations also identify their fathers, providing the names of four Mimesii, and among these four names are two Latin praenomina that are relatively rare in extant records.

== The inscription ==
The full inscription, as recorded in the Corpus Inscriptionum Latinarum, reads,

POST[UMUS] MIMESIUS C[AI] F[ILIUS] T[ITUS] MIMESIUS SERT[ORIS] F[ILIUS] NER[IUS] CAPIDAS C[AI] F(ILIUS) RUF[US] / NER[IUS] BABRIUS T[ITI] F[ILIUS] C[AIUS] CAPIDAS T[ITI] F[ILIUS] C[AI] N[EPOS] V[IBIUS] VOISIENUS T[ITI] F[ILIUS] MARONES / MURUM AB FORNICE AD CIRCUM ET FORNICEM CISTERNAMQ[UE] D[E] S[ENATUS] S[ENTENTIA] FACIUNDUM COIRAVERE

The men who built the walls are identified as:

1. Postumus Mimesius, the son of Gaius;
2. Titus Mimesius, the son of Sertor;
3. Nerius Capidas Rufus, the son of Gaius;
4. Nerius Babrius, the son of Titus;
5. Gaius Capidas, the son of Titus and grandson of Gaius; and
6. Vibius Voisienus, the son of Titus.

The praenomen Postumus was uncommon at Rome from the time of the early Republic, although a number of instances are known, and it later became a common cognomen. Sertor, meanwhile, is not known to have been used by any prominent Roman families, although it was included by Varro in a list of fourteen old praenomina (including Postumus) that had fallen out of use.

In addition to the two Mimesii, the two instances of the praenomen Nerius, which was typical of Umbrian names, and one of Vibius, which was relatively uncommon at Rome, make this inscription extraordinary, in terms of demonstrating that praenomina scarce at Rome could be widespread in the countryside.

== Members ==
This list includes abbreviated praenomina. For an explanation of this practice, see filiation.

- Gaius Mimesius, the father of Postumus.
- Sertor Mimesius, the father of Titus.
- Postumus Mimesius C. f., named in an inscription from Asisium in Umbria.
- Titus Mimesius Sert. f., named in an inscription from Asisium.

== See also ==
- List of Roman gentes

== Bibliography ==
- Liber de Praenominibus, a short treatise of uncertain authorship, traditionally appended to Valerius Maximus' Factorum ac Dictorum Memorabilium (Memorable Facts and Sayings).
- Theodor Mommsen et alii, Corpus Inscriptionum Latinarum (The Body of Latin Inscriptions, abbreviated CIL), Berlin-Brandenburgische Akademie der Wissenschaften (1853–present).
- René Cagnat et alii, L'Année épigraphique (The Year in Epigraphy, abbreviated AE), Presses Universitaires de France (1888–present).
- George Davis Chase, "The Origin of Roman Praenomina", in Harvard Studies in Classical Philology, vol. VIII (1897).
