= Aulus (praenomen) =

Latin personal name

Aulus (/ˈaʊləs, ˈɔːləs/ OW-ləs, AW-ləs, Latin: [ˈau̯lʊs]), feminine Aula, is a Latin praenomen, or personal name, which was common throughout Roman history from the earliest times to the end of the Western Empire in the fifth century. An alternative pronunciation leads to the variant spellings Olus, Ollus and Olla. Aulus was widely used by both patrician and plebeian gentes. The name gave rise to the patronymic gens Aulia, and perhaps also to gens Avilia and the cognomen Avitus. The name was usually abbreviated A., but occasionally Av. or Avl.

For most of Roman history, Aulus was one of the ten most common praenomina, being less common than Titus, the sixth most common praenomen, and comparable in frequency to Gnaeus, Spurius, and Sextus.

== Origin and meaning ==
The 4th century epitome De Praenominibus (Concerning Praenomina) by Julius Paris derives the name from the verb alo, to nourish. However, Chase argues that in no circumstances could the simple root of al- be transmuted into aul-. Another popular etymology derived the name from aula or olla, a palace, perhaps implying nobility, or from its homonym, aula or olla, a pot, presumably an affectionate reference to the size and shape of a healthy baby. Both of these are also probably examples of false etymology.

One of the most common Etruscan praenomina was Aule or Aules (also spelled Avle, Aveles, etc.), the Etruscan cognate of Aulus. Deecke argued that the name was originally Etruscan, deriving it from avile, found in the plural form avils ("years") in numerous funerary inscriptions. The name would then have been brought to Rome during its period of Etruscan domination in the 6th century BC. The reason why avile should give rise to a personal name is unclear. Deecke also believed that the Latin praenomen Spurius was of Etruscan origin.

Chase felt that this explanation looked too far afield for the source of Roman names, and, supported by Zimmermann, proposed that Aulus was derived from avulus, "little grandfather," a diminutive of avus. This analogy was based on similar diminutives in other languages, some of them meaning "uncle" (from Latin avunculus).
