= Gaius Oppius Sabinus Julius Nepos Manius Vibius Sollemnis Severus =

2nd century Roman senator, consul and provincial governor

Gaius Oppius Sabinus Julius Nepos Manius Vibius Sollemnis Severus was a Roman senator, who was active during the reign of Hadrian. He was suffect consul in an undetermined nundinium between AD 130 and 138. He is known entirely from a dedication on a statue base from Auximum (near Ancona), erected to honor him as the city's patron.

Although the inscription provides a straightforward cursus honorum, the career of Oppius Sabinus remains enigmatic. He was adlected into the Senate by the emperor Hadrian inter tribunicos, or as having held the magistracy of plebeian tribune, which was followed by his tenure as peregrine praetor, elected as the candidate of the same emperor; these two offices, demonstrating the favor of that emperor, obviously are dated before Hadrian's death in the year 138. After completing his term as praetor, Oppius Sabinus was selected as the legatus proconsulis or assistant to the governor of Hispania Baetica, a post commonly held for one year. He returned to Rome, where he was appointed curator of a number of roads: the viae Clodia, Annia, Cassia, Cimina, tria Trajanarum, and Amerina. These comprised the network covering Italy, and his supervision of them occupied his time for two years. Then he accepted a commission as legatus legionis or commander of the Legio XI Claudia, then stationed at Durostorum (Silistra) on the Danube, which kept him from Rome for three years. Oppius Sabinus received another appointment, this time as governor of the imperial province of Lusitania, which was commonly held also for three years. His last praetorian office was from the sortition, which awarded him the governorship of the public province of Hispania Baetica. It is thought his consulate followed immediately after this last governorship.

== Discussion ==
A number of details in his cursus honorum merit discussion. First, his origins. It is tempting to identify this Oppius Sabinus as the son of the consul of the year 84, Gaius Oppius Sabinus, who was killed by the Dacians the following year. The filiation of the younger Oppius Sabinus, "C.f." or "Gaius filius", supports this surmise. The name elements "Julius Nepos" could refer to his maternal grandfather. And the last four elements of his name, "Manius Vibius Sollemnis Severus" could come from the man who adopted Oppius Sabinus after his father's death and raised him. However, the primary objection to this surmise is that were the younger Oppius Sabinus the son of the consul of 84, he would have been considered a nobiles, or member of the Senatorial class, and not in need of being adlected into the Senate. Further, there is no record of either a Julius Nepos or Manius Vibius Sollemnis Severus living at the appropriate time. One could argue further that both men were of the equestrian class, which would explain their obscurity, but this verges on special pleading. The only safe inference from his name is that the young Oppius Sabinus was a native of the countryside near Rome, as were many of the Oppii Sabini.

As for the dates of his career, little improvement can be made on the conclusion originally offered by Attilio Degrassi and since accepted by Géza Alföldy that Oppius Sabinus acceded to the consulate between the years 130 and 138. The time required to pass through all of the offices and appointments following his praetorship would take at a minimum 10 years: assuming Hadrian promoted him to the Senate immediately after his own elevation to emperor in 118, and add a year for his praetorship, Oppius Sabinus would have been legatus to the governor of Baetica in 120/121 (whose identity we do not know), and consul no earlier than the year 130. The terminus ante quem of 138 is the year Hadrian died, for in the inscription he is referred to in a manner to suggest this emperor was still alive.

None of the men who are known to have governed Lusitania and Baetica between the years 125 and 138 have been precisely dated, so this information does not help us narrow the dates of his career. That all of the consuls for the years 133, 134 and 135 are known does offer some help, for clearly Oppius Sabinus could not have been consul in those years. Beyond this we cannot go.

Needless to say, his life is a blank after his consulship.
