= Theophanes Chrysobalantes =

Theophanes Chrysobalantes (Greek: Θεοφάνης Χρυσοβαλάντης, fl. c. mid-10th century), erroneously known as Theophanes Nonnus or Nonnos in older scholarship, was a Byzantine physician who wrote an outline of medicine dedicated to Emperor Constantine VII Porphyrogennetos.

== Identity ==
The extant manuscripts identify the author as Theophanes; the name Nonnus was apparently fabricated by the 16th-century copyist Andreas Darmarios. The name Chrysobalantes was either an epithet or a variant of the documented Byzantine family name Chrysobalantites. Some copies of the manuscripts are anonymous or identify the author incorrectly as Michael Psellos.

Theophanes was likely a physician himself. Two works reference him as their author:

- An outline of past medical treatises with some original material by Chrysobalantes himself, known by the Latin title Epitome de curatione morborum (Ancient Greek: Ἐπιτομαὶ περὶ τῆς τῶν ἰατρικῶν θεωρημάτων συναγωγῆς)
- A treatise on diet, known as De alimentis (Περὶ διαίτης)

In addition, an anonymous outline on medical cures (Synopsis de remediis, Σύνοψις ἐν ἐπιτόμῳ περὶ τῶν βοηθημάτων) is likely part of his work, on account of similarities in the preface with those of the other two works, as well as the thematical coherence the whole represents.

== See also ==
- Nonnus (disambiguation), for other people named Nonnus

== Sources ==
- Lilie, Ralph-Johannes; Ludwig, Claudia; Pratsch, Thomas; Zielke, Beate (2013). Prosopographie der mittelbyzantinischen Zeit Online. Berlin-Brandenburgische Akademie der Wissenschaften. Nach Vorarbeiten F. Winkelmanns erstellt (in German). Berlin and Boston: De Gruyter.
- Sonderkamp, Joseph A. M. (1984). "Theophanes Nonnus: Medicine in the Circle of Constantine Porphyrogenitus". Dumbarton Oaks Papers. 38: 29–41. doi:10.2307/1291492. JSTOR 1291492.
