= Octavius (praenomen) =

Latin name

Octavius is a Latin praenomen, or personal name. It was never particularly common at Rome, but may have been used more frequently in the countryside. The feminine form is Octavia. The name gave rise to the patronymic gens Octavia, and perhaps also to gens Otacilia, also written Octacilia. A late inscription gives the abbreviation Oct.

== History ==
The praenomen Octavius is best known from Octavius Mamilius, the prince of Tusculum, and son-in-law of Lucius Tarquinius Superbus, the seventh and last king of Rome, who was slain by Titus Herminius at the Battle of Lake Regillus about 498 BC. Members of the Mamilia gens afterward came to Rome, and the name must have been used by the ancestors of the Octavii and perhaps the Otacilii, but examples of the praenomen are scarce. At least in its feminine form, Octavius seems to have been used on occasion throughout the Roman Republic and into imperial times. The name was used by gens Maecia, and a woman named "Octavia Valeria Vera" lived at Ticinum in the second or third century. Either through direct transmission or revival, the name has survived to the present day.

=== Origin and meaning ===
The root of Octavius is the Latin numeral octavus, meaning "eight" or "eighth". It might be expected to appear as Octavus, feminine Octava, but in the few examples known it seems to have been treated as an "-i stem", and is given as Octavius or Octavia. This occurs with certain other praenomina, including the feminine forms Marcia and Titia, which are usually found in place of the expected Marca and Tita.

Octavius falls into the same class as the masculine praenomina Quintus, Sextus, Septimus, Nonus, and Decimus, as well as the feminine names Prima, Secunda, Tertia, Quarta, Quinta, Sexta, Septima, Nona, and Decima. Originally the name was probably given to an eighth child, eighth son, or eighth daughter. However, scholars have long postulated that, at least at Rome, such names might instead refer to the month of the year in which a child was born. Over time, the literal meanings of such names were commonly ignored, and the more common names bestowed without regard for meaning, perhaps explaining why certain names, such as those based on the numerals from seven to nine, came to be neglected.

In the form Uchtave, the praenomen was also used by the Etruscans.

== See also ==
- Roman naming conventions

== Bibliography ==
- Titus Livius (Livy), History of Rome.
- Theodor Mommsen et alii, Corpus Inscriptionum Latinarum (The Body of Latin Inscriptions, abbreviated CIL), Berlin-Brandenburgische Akademie der Wissenschaften (1853–present).
- René Cagnat et alii, L'Année épigraphique (The Year in Epigraphy, abbreviated AE), Presses Universitaires de France (1888–present).
- George Davis Chase, "The Origin of Roman Praenomina", in Harvard Studies in Classical Philology, vol. VIII, pp. 103–184 (1897).
- Jacques Heurgon, La Vie quotidienne chez lez Etrusques (Daily Life of the Etruscans), Hachette, Paris (1961, 1989).
- Mika Kajava, Roman Female Praenomina: Studies in the Nomenclature of Roman Women, Acta Instituti Romani Finlandiae (1994).
