= Postumus (praenomen) =

Latin name

Postumus is a Latin praenomen, or personal name, which was most common during the early centuries of the Roman Republic. It gave rise to the patronymic gens Postumia, and later became a common cognomen, or surname. The feminine form is Postuma. The name was not regularly abbreviated, but is sometimes found as Pos. or Post.

Postumus was used by both patrician and plebeian gentes, including the Aebutii, Antistii, Cominii, Livii, Mimesii, Plautii, Sempronii, Sulpicii, and Veturii; and naturally it must once have been used by the ancestors of gens Postumia. Other gentes which later used it as a cognomen may originally have used it as a praenomen. Because it was not a common name, there are few examples of the feminine form, but Marcus Terentius Varro listed it together with other archaic praenomina that were no longer in general use by the 1st century BC, and Plutarchus mentions that it was given to the youngest daughter of the dictator Lucius Cornelius Sulla, who lived during Varro's time.

== Origin and meaning ==
Popular etymology connects this praenomen with the modern adjective posthumous, meaning "after death", from the Latin roots for "after" and "earth" (as a metaphor for burial), and assume that it was given to children born after the death of their fathers. Such associations date from at least the time of Varro, and probably contributed to the scarcity of the name. A similar example of false etymology probably limited the use of the praenomen Opiter.

In fact, the name is derived from the adjective postumus, meaning "last" (the superlative of posterus, "next"). The name was thus given to a youngest child, son, or daughter. Naturally, this also applied to children born after the death of their father, and this coincidence is no doubt responsible for much of the confusion about the meaning of the praenomen.

== Bibliography ==
- Plutarchus, Lives of the Noble Greeks and Romans.
- Liber de Praenominibus, a short treatise of uncertain authorship, traditionally appended to Valerius Maximus' Factorum ac Dictorum Memorabilium (Memorable Facts and Sayings).
- August Pauly, Georg Wissowa, et alii, Realencyclopädie der Classischen Altertumswissenschaft, J. B. Metzler, Stuttgart (1894–1980).
- George Davis Chase, "The Origin of Roman Praenomina", in Harvard Studies in Classical Philology, vol. VIII (1897).
- Mika Kajava, Roman Female Praenomina: Studies in the Nomenclature of Roman Women, Acta Instituti Romani Finlandiae (1994).
