= Abudius Ruso =

Ancient Roman politician

Abudius Ruso was a former aedile and he served in Upper Germania as a legate in Gaius Cornelius Lentulus Gaetulicus' army during the reign of emperor Tiberius. Ruso attacked Lentulus for betrothing his daughter to the son of Praetorian prefect Sejanus, who had fallen out of favor three years earlier. It is unclear whether there was a formal charge against Lentulus; in any case, he was not convicted, but Ruso was banished from Rome.
