= Decimus (praenomen) =

Latin personal name

Decimus (/ˈdɛsɪməs/ DESS-im-əs, Classical Latin: [ˈdɛkɪmʊs]), very rarely feminine Decima, is a Latin praenomen, or personal name, usually abbreviated D. Although never especially common, Decimus was used throughout Roman history from the earliest times to the end of the Western Empire and beyond, surviving into modern times. The name also gave rise to the patronymic gens Decimia.

Decimus was especially favored by the plebeian gens Junia, which may originally have been patrician. However, the name does not seem to have been used regularly by any other patrician family. It was widespread amongst the plebeians, and resisted the general trend of uncommon praenomina to become less frequent over time, instead becoming more popular towards the end of the Roman Republic and into Imperial times.

== Origin and meaning of the name ==
Decimus is the Latin word for tenth, and it falls into a class of similar praenomina including the masculine names Quintus, Sextus, Septimus, Octavius, and Nonus, as well as the feminine names Prima, Secunda, Tertia, Quarta, Quinta, Sexta, Septima, Octavia, and Nona. It is generally believed that the name was originally given to a tenth child, a tenth son, or a tenth daughter. However, it has also been argued that Decimus and the other praenomina of this type could refer to the month of the year in which a child was born. It may be that such names could be given for either reason.

Whatever the original reason for the name, it is clear from the historical record that parents frequently chose these praenomina because they were family names, and not because of their meaning. Chase cites the example of a grandfather, father, and son in gens Junia, each of whom bore the name Decimus, and achieved the consulship, as well as a later case in which the grandfather and father were both consuls. It was highly unlikely that each of these was a tenth son, or even a tenth child. A similar case could be made for the many generations of certain families, such as the Fabii, who made extensive use of the praenomen Quintus, or the Julii with respect to the praenomen Sextus.

The Oscan praenomen Decius or Deciis is derived from the same root, and gave rise to the patronymic gens Decia.

== See also ==
- Roman naming conventions
