= Sertor (praenomen) =

Latin name

Sertor is a Latin praenomen, or personal name. It was never common, and is not known to have been used by any prominent families at Rome. It gave rise to the patronymic gens Sertoria. The feminine form was probably Sertora. The name was not regularly abbreviated, but is sometimes found as Sert.

The praenomen Sertor was used by the plebeian gentes Mimesia, Varisidia, Vedia, and perhaps Resia, and must once have been used by the ancestors of the gens Sertoria, whose most distinguished member was the Roman general Quintus Sertorius. The name was familiar to the scholar Marcus Terentius Varro, who described it as an antique praenomen, no longer in general use by the 1st century BC. As with other praenomina, it may have been more common, and survived longer, in the countryside; at least one example from Umbria dates to Varro's time or later.

== Origin and meaning ==
The anonymous Liber de Praenominibus derives Sertor from satio, a planted field; while Festus derived it from the same root as adsertor, a person who asserts the freedom of another, or claims him as his own. These appear to be examples of false etymology.

Chase believed that the praenomen was probably of Umbrian origin, and was the equivalent of the Latin word servator, meaning "protector" or "preserver". Its meaning would thus be similar to the more common praenomen Servius. However, the name seems to have been used throughout Italy, for the Mimesii were apparently Latins, while the Sertorii were of Sabine extraction; and in any case Varro considered it to be Latin, if obsolete.

An inscription belonging to the obscure gens Resia gives the praenomen Fertor, which some scholars amend to Sertor. Chase postulates that it might be a separate praenomen, meaning "supporter". The Etruscan praenomen Sethre might be derived from Sertor.
