= Obsidius =

Roman soldier

Obsidius was the commander of a Frentanian troop of horse, serving under the consul Laevinus in the campaign against Pyrrhus in 280 BC. He distinguished himself in the battle fought at the river Liris in that year by the daring attempt which he made upon the king's life. He unhorsed Pyrrhus but was killed by the personal attendants of the king.
