= Septimus (praenomen) =

Ancient Roman personal name

Septimus (Latin pronunciation: [ˈsɛptɪmʊs]) is a Latin praenomen, or personal name. It was never particularly common at Rome. The name is the root for the patronymic Septimia gens. The feminine form is Septima. The name was not regularly abbreviated.

The praenomen Septimus was quite rare at Rome, but it seems to have been more popular in rural Italy. It was certainly used by the gentes Marcia and Modia, and must have been used by the ancestors of gens Septimia. Chase cites two inscriptions in which it occurs after the nomen of a woman, in the place usually occupied by the cognomen. However, Septimus is not otherwise attested as a cognomen in either family, suggesting that the order of names was reversed, and that the praenomen was used by the Aebutii and Casperii. To these families, Kajava adds one instance from gens Aemilia and perhaps one from gens Cincia.

== Origin and meaning ==
Septimus is the Latin word for seventh, and the name belongs to the same class as the masculine praenomina Quintus, Sextus, Octavius, Nonus, and Decimus, as well as the feminine names Prima, Secunda, Tertia, Quarta, Quinta, Sexta, Octavia, Nona, and Decima.

Originally, the praenomen was probably used for a seventh child, seventh son, or seventh daughter. However, it has also been postulated that such names referred to the month of the year in which a child was born. This explanation does not seem to account for the relative scarcity of Septimus, Octavius, or Nonus; but because parents were generally free to choose any name they wished, irrespective of its meaning, it may have been used for either reason.

The Oscan cognate of Septimus is Seppius or Seppiis. It seems to have been a relatively common praenomen.

== See also ==
- Roman naming conventions
