= Opiternia gens =

The gens Opiternia was a Faliscan family occurring in Roman history. The nomen Opiternius is a patronymic surname, derived from the ancient praenomen Opiter, as is the related Opetreius, and perhaps shares a common root with the nomina of the gentes Oppia and Opsia.

The only member of this gens mentioned in ancient historians was Lucius Opiternius, a priest of Bacchus, who helped introduce the Bacchanalia at Rome, the discovery of which in 186 BC threw the senate into panic.

== See also ==
- List of Roman gentes

== Bibliography ==
- Titus Livius (Livy), History of Rome.
- George Davis Chase, "The Origin of Roman Praenomina", in Harvard Studies in Classical Philology, vol. VIII (1897).
