= Servius (praenomen) =

Latin personal name

Servius (Classical Latin: [ˈsɛru̯iʊs]), feminine Servia, is a Latin praenomen, or personal name, which was used throughout the period of the Roman Republic, and well into imperial times. It was used by both patrician and plebeian families, and gave rise to the patronymic gens Servilia. The name was regularly abbreviated Ser.

Servius was never one of the most common praenomina; about ten other names were used more frequently. Most families did not use it, although it was a favorite of the gens Cornelii and the gens Sulpicii, two of the greatest patrician houses at Rome. The name gradually became less common towards the end of the Republic, but was still used in imperial times.

== Origin and meaning of the name ==
The original meaning of Servius was forgotten by the late Republic. Chase derives the name from the verb servo, to keep or preserve. This seems consistent with other Latin praenomina, such as Sertor, which appears to have a similar meaning.

Varro had nothing to say about the name, although the epitome, De Praenominibus ("Concerning Praenomina") by Julius Paris, suggests that it was given to a child whose mother died in childbirth. Dionysius of Halicarnassus, apparently followed by Festus, indicated that it was given to a child whose mother was held in bondage. This etymology was based on the similarity between Servius and servus, a slave, and although it is certainly an example of false etymology, the association of these words is probably the main reason that Servius was not more common.
