= Nonus (praenomen) =

Ancient Roman praenomen

Nonus (/ˈnoʊnəs/) is a Latin praenomen, or personal name. It was never particularly common at Rome, but may have been used more frequently in the countryside. Although not attested in surviving Latin inscriptions, the name must have been used occasionally, as it gave rise to the patronymic gens Nonia. The feminine form is Nona. Nonus was probably not used frequently enough to acquire a regular abbreviation.

== Origin and meaning of the name ==
Nonus is the Latin word for ninth, and the name must originally have been used for a ninth child, a ninth son, or a ninth daughter. It belongs to the same class of praenomina as the masculine names Quintus, Sextus, Septimus, Octavius, and Decimus, as well as the feminine names Prima, Secunda, Tertia, Quarta, Quinta, Sexta, Septima, Octavia, and Decima. However, it may also have been used for children who were born in November, the ninth month of the Roman calendar.

The name appears to have been quite rare in Latin, although the reason for this is unclear. Perhaps nine was simply the least auspicious number between five and ten (Septimus and Octavius were also quite rare in Latin). However, it is also possible that the Oscan praenomen Novius was derived from the same root. If this is the case, then Roman families may have preferred that form to Nonus on the rare instances in which it was called for.
