= Oppia gens =

Family in ancient Rome

The gens Oppia was an ancient Roman family, known from the first century of the Republic down to imperial times. The gens may originally have been patrician, as they supplied priestesses to the College of Vestals at a very early date, but all of the Oppii known to history were plebeians. None of them obtained the consulship until imperial times.

== Origin ==
The Oppii were probably Sabines, one of the peoples who made up a significant portion of the early Roman populace. The nomen Oppius is classed by Chase among a number of gentilicia that were not Latin, but came from among the various neighboring regions, in this case that of the Sabines.

== Praenomina ==
The earliest Oppii to appear in history used the praenomina Spurius, Marcus, and Gaius. To these, later generations added Lucius, Quintus, and Publius. All of these were quite common throughout Roman history, except for Spurius, which was reasonably common in the early Republic, but became quite distinctive by imperial times.

== Branches and cognomina ==
The chief surnames of the Oppii were Capito, Cornicen or Cornicinus, and Salinator, of which Capito and Salinator occur on coins. Capito was a common cognomen derived from caput, the head, and was typically applied to someone with a large or prominent head. Cornicen, of which Cornicinus is a diminutive, is an occupational surname, referring to a horn-blower. Salinator, also derived from an occupation, referred to a salt merchant.

== Members ==
This list includes abbreviated praenomina. For an explanation of this practice, see filiation.

- Oppia, one of the Vestal Virgins in 483 BC, a year in which the Roman populace was uneasy after a series of events dividing the patrician and plebeian orders. Following a series of ill omens during the year, Oppia was charged with violating her vow of chastity, condemned, and put to death.
- Spurius Oppius Cornicen, one of the plebeian members of the second Decemvirate in 450 BC. After the fall of the decemvirs, he was to be tried on a charge of unjustly causing an old soldier to be scourged, but rather than await the results of a trial, he took his own life.
- Marcus Oppius, was chosen one of the leaders of the soldiers following the second secession of the plebs in 449 BC.
- Gaius Oppius, elected tribune of the plebs following the abolition of the Decemvirs in 449 BC.
- Gaius Oppius, tribune of the plebs in 215 BC, during the Second Punic War, brought forward a sumptuary law restricting the expenses of Roman women. This law, the lex Oppia, was repealed in 195, over the vehement objections of Cato the Elder.
- Vestia Oppia, a native of Atella, lived at Capua during the period when that city was occupied by the Carthaginians during the Second Punic War. She offered daily sacrifices for the success of the Romans, and was rewarded when Capua was captured by the Romans in 210 BC.
- Gaius Oppius, praefectus sociorum in 201 BC, was sent to attack the lands held by the Boii, but was blocked by enemy forces, and prevented from reaching his destination.
- Lucius Oppius Salinator, plebeian aedile in 193 BC, was sent to Sicily the following year with a fleet of twenty ships. In 191 he was praetor, with Sardinia as his province.
- Oppius, probably one of the praetors in 146 BC, defeated the Gauls.
- Quintus Oppius, proconsul of Asia during the First Mithridatic War, was surrounded at Laodiceia, where the inhabitants surrendered him to Mithridates. Mithridates displayed Oppius as a trophy of his victory over the Romans, but later released him to Sulla.
- Oppius, praetor in Achaea circa 80 BC, and subsequently accused by Verres.
- Publius Oppius, quaestor in Bithynia under the consul Marcus Aurelius Cotta in 74 BC, diverted supplies for his own benefit, and threatened Cotta when confronted. He was defended eloquently by Cicero in BC 69, but the oration has been lost.
- Oppia, the widow of Lucius Minidius, a merchant or banker at Elis, with whose heirs Cicero had some financial dealings.
- Gaius Oppius, one of Caesar's closest friends, whom the dictator entrusted with the government of Rome during his absence, in 45 BC. He attempted to reconcile Cicero to Caesar, and then to Octavian, and wrote a number of lost historical and biographical works. He may be the author of De Bello Africo, otherwise attributed to Aulus Hirtius.
- Lucius Oppius M. f., a friend of Cicero, whom he recommended to Quintus Gallius, and Quintus Marcius Philippus, the proconsul of Asia, in 54 BC. He is probably the same eques who testified on behalf of Flaccus, whom Cicero defended in 59 BC.
- Oppius Cornicinus, a senator, and the son-in-law of Sextus Atilius Serranus Gavianus, tribune of the plebs in 57 BC.
- Spurius Oppius, praetor in 44 BC.
- Marcus Oppius, proscribed along with his father by the triumvirs in 43 BC, he carried his feeble father on his shoulders to safety. When the proscription had been lifted, he was elected aedile.
- Marcus Oppius Capito, propraetor circa 40 BC, is named on coins issued by Marcus Antonius.
- Oppius Chares, a Latin grammarian who taught into extreme old age.
- Oppius Gallus, ill-treated by Marcus Popillius.
- Oppius Statianus, legate of Marcus Antonius during his campaign against the Parthians in 36 BC. When Antonius went ahead to besiege Phraata, Oppius made to follow with the army's supplies, but was ambushed and killed by the enemy.
- Spurius Oppius, (Note: The former reading, Lucius Oppius, has been shown to be erroneous by Camodeca.) consul suffectus in AD 43, serving from October to the end of the year.
- Gaius Oppius Sabinus, consul in AD 84, together with the emperor Domitian. After his consulship, he became governor of Moesia, where he was slain in an invasion by the Dacians circa AD 85.
- Gaius Oppius C. f. Sabinus Julius Nepos Manius Vibius Sollemnis Severus, consul suffectus in an uncertain year, served as legate of the eleventh legion in the time of Hadrian, and was proconsul of Hispania Baetica.
- Oppia, described by Juvenal as an unchaste woman.
- Quintus Oppius, named on a coin depicting the head of Venus on the obverse, and Victoria on the reverse.

== See also ==
- List of Roman gentes

== Bibliography ==
- Marcus Tullius Cicero, Epistulae ad Atticum, Epistulae ad Familiares, Pro Flacco, Philippicae.
- Gaius Sallustius Crispus (Sallust), Historiae (The Histories).
- Pseudo-Asconius, Commentarius in Oratorio Ciceronis in Verrem (Commentary on Cicero's In Verrem), ed. Orelli.
- Titus Livius (Livy), History of Rome.
- Dionysius of Halicarnassus, Romaike Archaiologia.
- Valerius Maximus, Factorum ac Dictorum Memorabilium (Memorable Facts and Sayings).
- Marcus Fabius Quintilianus (Quintilian), Institutio Oratoria (Institutes of Oratory).
- Publius Cornelius Tacitus, Annales.
- Plutarchus, Lives of the Noble Greeks and Romans.
- Gaius Suetonius Tranquillus, De Vita Caesarum (Lives of the Caesars, or The Twelve Caesars), De Illustribus Grammaticis (The Illustrious Grammarians).
- Decimus Junius Juvenalis, Satirae (Satires).
- Appianus Alexandrinus (Appian), Bella Mithridatica (The Mithridatic Wars), Bellum Civile (The Civil War).
- Athenaeus, Deipnosophistae (The Banquet of the Learned).
- Lucius Cassius Dio Cocceianus (Cassius Dio), Roman History.
- Eutropius, Breviarium Historiae Romanae (Abridgement of the History of Rome).
- Eusebius Sophronius Hieronymus (St. Jerome), In Chronicon Eusebii (The Chronicon of Eusebius).
- Jordanes, Getica.
- Joseph Hilarius Eckhel, Doctrina Numorum Veterum (The Study of Ancient Coins, 1792–1798).
- Wilhelm Drumann, Geschichte Roms in seinem Übergang von der republikanischen zur monarchischen Verfassung, oder: Pompeius, Caesar, Cicero und ihre Zeitgenossen, Königsberg (1834–1844).
- Dictionary of Greek and Roman Biography and Mythology, William Smith, ed., Little, Brown and Company, Boston (1849).
- René Cagnat et alii, L'Année épigraphique (The Year in Epigraphy, abbreviated AE), Presses Universitaires de France (1888–present).
- Paul von Rohden, Elimar Klebs, & Hermann Dessau, Prosopographia Imperii Romani (The Prosopography of the Roman Empire, abbreviated PIR), Berlin (1898).
- T. Robert S. Broughton, The Magistrates of the Roman Republic, American Philological Association (1952).
- John C. Traupman, The New College Latin & English Dictionary, Bantam Books, New York (1995).
- Giuseppe Camodeca, "I consoli del 43 e gli Antistii Veteres d’età claudia dalla riedizione delle Tabulae Erculanenses" (The Consuls of 43 and the Antistii Veteres of the Claudian Age, from the New Edition of the Tabulae Herculanenses), in Zeitschrift für Papyrologie und Epigraphik, vol. 140, pp. 227–236 (2002).
