= Gnaeus (praenomen) =

Latin personal name

Gnaeus (/ˈ(ɡ)naɪəs, ˈniːəs/ (G)NY-əs, NEE-əs, Latin: [ˈŋnae̯.ʊs]), feminine Gnaea, is a Latin praenomen, or personal name, which was common throughout the period of the Roman Republic, and well into imperial times. The praenomen was used by both patrician and plebeian families, and gave rise to the patronymic gens Naevia. The name was regularly abbreviated Cn., based on the archaic spelling, Cnaeus, dating from the period before the letters "C" and "G" were differentiated.

For most of Roman history, Gnaeus was one of the ten most common praenomina, being less common than Titus, the sixth most common praenomen, and comparable in frequency to Aulus, Spurius, and Sextus. Although the name was used by a minority of families at Rome, it was favored by a number of prominent gentes, including the Cornelii, Domitii, Manlii, and Servilii. The name gradually became less common in imperial times.

== Origin and meaning ==
According to Festus, the praenomen Gnaeus originally referred to a birthmark, which was naevus in Latin. This etymology is generally accepted by modern scholars. In his treatise on the origin of Roman praenomina, Chase cites the archaic spelling Gnaivos in support of this explanation. However, as with other praenomina, Gnaeus was generally chosen because it was a family name, not necessarily because the children who received it had a noteworthy birthmark.

Gnaeus was one of a number of Latin praenomina borrowed by the Etruscans, in whose language it became Cneve or Cneies.
