= Spurius (praenomen) =

Latin personal name

Spurius (Latin pronunciation: [ˈspʊriʊs]), feminine Spuria, is a Latin praenomen, or personal name, which was used primarily during the period of the Roman Republic, and which fell into disuse in imperial times. It was used by both patrician and plebeian families, and gave rise to the patronymic gens Spurilia. The name was originally abbreviated S., as it was the most common praenomen beginning with that letter; but, as it grew less common, it was sometimes abbreviated Sp.

For most of the Roman Republic, Spurius was about the ninth most-common praenomen. Although used by a minority of families, it was favored by many, including the gentes Carvilia, Cassia, Furia, Nautia, Papiria, Postumia, Servilia, and Veturia. It was most common during the early centuries of the Republic, and gradually declined in popularity until it all but disappeared during the 1st century AD.

== Origin and meaning of the name ==
The actual meaning of Spurius is unproven. The name was used by the Etruscans in the form Spurie, and it was used by several Roman families that had Etruscan roots, so it has been postulated that it was either borrowed from the Etruscan language, or was a cognate of an Etruscan word meaning something akin to city dweller.

Popular etymology, however, connected the name with the phrase, sine patre filius, that is, son without a father, and the explanation that it was given to children born out of wedlock. This was the opinion of Sextus Pompeius Festus, which is accepted by Chase, perhaps surprisingly considering the unlikelihood of anyone deliberately choosing such a name, or passing it down within a family for many generations. This explanation is almost certainly wrong, and is an example of false etymology. However, it probably contributed to the decline in the use of the praenomen, and gave rise to the modern adjective spurious.

While it cannot be proven that any Latin praenomina were borrowed from Etruscan, and Spurius was used by a number of gentes of indisputably Latin origin, the explanation that it was connected with a word meaning city or citizen appears reasonably likely.
