= Opiter (praenomen) =

Latin name

Opiter (/ˈoʊpɪtər/ or /ˈɒpɪtər/) is a Latin praenomen, or personal name, which was used primarily during the early centuries of the Roman Republic. It is not usually abbreviated, but is sometimes found with the abbreviation Opet., apparently based on an archaic spelling of the name. No examples of a feminine form used as a praenomen are known, but from a cognomen it appears to be Opita. (Note: Caecilia Opita, CIL VIII, 476.) The name gave rise to the patronymic gens Opiternia, and perhaps also gens Opetreia.

The praenomen Opiter was used by the patrician gentes Verginia and Lucretia, and several prominent members of these gentes with this name held important magistracies during the first two centuries of the Republic. The name must also have been used at one time by the ancestors of gens Opiternia. As with other rare praenomina, Opiter may have been more frequently used in the countryside. However, writing in the first century BC, Marcus Terentius Varro described it as obsolete.

== Origin and meaning ==
The gens Opiternia may have been Faliscan, as a Faliscan named Lucius Opiternius is mentioned by the historian Livy. The Faliscan language was closely related to early Latin. A Latin inscription reading "OPI. SAUFIO L. L." may be interpreted as "Opiter Saufeius, freedman of Lucius," although Chase felt that the praenomen was probably Oppius. Despite the fact that both the Verginii and the Lucretii were of Etruscan origin, the praenomen Opiter does not appear to have been used by the Etruscans.

The short treatise, De Praenominibus ("Concerning Praenomina", of uncertain authorship, but usually appended to Valerius Maximus), mentions a popular etymology of Opiter, deriving it from avus (grandfather) and pater (father). According to this theory, the name was originally given to a child whose father had died, and who was therefore raised by his grandfather. This opinion was shared by Festus, but it almost certainly depends on a false etymology. Chase argues that avus cannot reasonably have contributed to the name, nor does he find any evidence for pater. Instead, he postulates that Opiter is derived from the same root as ops (help), and should be interpreted as "helper".

If Chase is correct, then Opiter is probably derived from the same root as the names of the plebeian gentes Opimia and Opisia, and may be the Latin cognate of the Oscan praenomen Oppius or Oppiis, as well as gens Oppia.

== People ==
- Opiter Verginius Tricostus, consul
- Opiter Verginius Tricostus Esquilinus, consul

== Bibliography ==
- Titus Livius (Livy), History of Rome.
- Liber de Praenominibus, a short treatise of uncertain authorship, traditionally appended to Valerius Maximus' Factorum ac Dictorum Memorabilium (Memorable Facts and Sayings).
- Sextus Pompeius Festus, Epitome de M. Verrio Flacco de Verborum Significatu (Epitome of Marcus Verrius Flaccus: On the Meaning of Words).
- Dictionary of Greek and Roman Biography and Mythology, William Smith, ed., Little, Brown and Company, Boston (1849).
- Theodor Mommsen et alii, Corpus Inscriptionum Latinarum (The Body of Latin Inscriptions, abbreviated CIL), Berlin-Brandenburgische Akademie der Wissenschaften (1853–present).
- August Pauly, Georg Wissowa, et alii, Realencyclopädie der Classischen Altertumswissenschaft (Scientific Encyclopedia of the Knowledge of Classical Antiquities, abbreviated RE), J. B. Metzler, Stuttgart (1894–1980).
- George Davis Chase, "The Origin of Roman Praenomina", in Harvard Studies in Classical Philology, vol. VIII (1897).
- Harper's Dictionary of Classical Literature and Antiquities, Harry Thurston Peck, ed. (Second Edition, 1897).
- Mika Kajava, Roman Female Praenomina: Studies in the Nomenclature of Roman Women, Acta Instituti Romani Finlandiae (1994).
