= Sextus (praenomen) =

Latin personal name

Sextus (Latin pronunciation: [ˈsɛkstʊs]), feminine Sexta, is a Latin praenomen, or personal name, which was common throughout all periods of Roman history. It was used by both patrician and plebeian families, and gave rise to the patronymic gentes Sextia and Sextilia. The name was regularly abbreviated Sex., but occasionally is found abbreviated S. (usually used for the praenomen Spurius), or Sext.

Sextus was about the tenth most-common praenomen for most of Roman history, although it became slightly more common in imperial times, as other praenomina declined in popularity. Many families did not use it, but it was widespread amongst all social classes, and was favored by some families. The name survived the collapse of Roman civil institutions in the 5th and 6th centuries, and has continued in use into modern times.

== Origin and meaning of the name ==
Sextus is the Latin word for sixth, and it falls into a class of similar praenomina including the masculine names Quintus, Septimus, Octavius, Nonus, and Decimus, as well as the feminine names Prima, Secunda, Tertia, Quarta, Septima, Octavia, Nona, and Decima. It is generally believed that the name was originally given to a sixth child, a sixth son, or a sixth daughter. However, it has also been argued that Sextus and the other praenomina of this type could refer to the month of the year in which a child was born; in this case the month of Sextilis, or August, the sixth month of the old Roman calendar. It may be that such names were given for both reasons.

Whatever the original reason that the name was given, parents were free to use it for any reason of their choosing. The primary consideration seems to have been the desire to pass on family names. Thus, the first son in a family was almost as likely as the sixth to be named Sextus.

== See also ==
- Roman naming conventions
