= Quintus (praenomen) =

Latin personal name

Quintus (Latin pronunciation: [ˈkᶣiːntʊs]), feminine Quinta, is a Latin praenomen, or personal name, which was common throughout all periods of Roman history. It was used by both patrician and plebeian families, and gave rise to the patronymic gentes Quinctia and Quinctilia. The name was regularly abbreviated Q.

Throughout Roman history, Quintus was one of the most common praenomina, generally occupying fourth or fifth place, behind Lucius, Gaius, and Marcus, and occurring about as frequently as Publius. Although many families did not use the name at all, it was particularly favored by others. The name continued to be used after the collapse of Roman civil institutions in the fifth and sixth centuries, and has survived to the present day.

== Origin and meaning ==
Quintus is the Latin word for "fifth", and it falls into a class of similar praenomina including the masculine names Sextus, Septimus, Octavius, Nonus, and Decimus, as well as the feminine names Prima, Secunda, Tertia, Quarta, Sexta, Septima, Octavia, Nona, and Decima. It is generally believed that the name was originally given to a fifth child, a fifth son, or a fifth daughter. However, it has also been argued that Quintus and the other praenomina of this type could refer to the month of the year in which a child was born. It may be that such names were given for both reasons.

Whatever the original reason that the name was given, parents were free to use it for any reason of their choosing. The primary consideration seems to have been the desire to pass on family names. Thus, the first son in a family was almost as likely as the fifth to be named Quintus.

The Oscan cognate of Quintus was Pompo, (Note: The Proto-Italic q sound remained q in Latin but became p in Oscan.) a name best known from the father of Numa Pompilius, the second king of Rome. The gentes Pompilia and Pomponia (both of which claimed descent from Numa Pompilius) were derived from this praenomen. The nomen Pompeius may also be a patronymic based on the name Pompo.

== See also ==
- Roman naming conventions
