= Publius (praenomen) =

Latin praenomen

Publius (Latin: [ˈpʊːbli.ʊs]), feminine Publia, is a Latin praenomen, or personal name. It was used by both patrician and plebeian families, and was very common at all periods of Roman history. It gave rise to the patronymic gens Publilia, and perhaps also gens Publicia. The name was regularly abbreviated P.

Throughout Roman history, Publius was one of the most frequently-used praenomina, typically occupying fourth or fifth place, behind Lucius, Gaius, and Marcus, and occurring with about the same frequency as Quintus. The feminine form Publia was also quite common, and is found in numerous inscriptions as late as the 3rd century, and perhaps beyond.

== Origin and meaning of the name ==
Publius is thought to derive from the same root as populus and publicus, meaning "the people" or "of the people". Chase provides several examples of similar names from other Indo-European languages, like the Germanic Dietrich and Celtic Toutiorix. Although Publius is generally regarded as a quintessentially Latin praenomen, a few scholars have proposed an Etruscan origin for the name. This may be partly based on the fact that the name, in the form Puplie, was also used by the Etruscans.
