= Praenomen =

Personal given name in Ancient Rome

The praenomen (Classical Latin: [prae̯ˈnoːmɛn]; plural: praenomina) was a first name chosen by the parents of a Roman child. It was first bestowed on the dies lustricus (day of lustration), the eighth day after the birth of a girl, or the ninth day after the birth of a boy. The praenomen would then be formally conferred a second time when girls married, or when boys assumed the toga virilis upon reaching manhood. Although it was the oldest of the tria nomina commonly used in Roman naming conventions, by the late republic, most praenomina were so common that most people were called by their praenomina only by family or close friends. For this reason, although they continued to be used, praenomina gradually disappeared from public records during imperial times. Although both men and women received praenomina, women's praenomina were frequently ignored, and they were gradually abandoned by many Roman families, though they continued to be used in some families and in the countryside.

== Background ==
The tria nomina, consisting of praenomen, nomen and cognomen, which are today regarded as a distinguishing feature of Roman culture, first developed and spread throughout Italy in pre-Roman times. Most of the people of Italy spoke languages belonging to the Italic branch of the Indo-European language family; the three major groups within the Italian Peninsula were the Latino-Faliscan languages, including the tribes of the Latini, or Latins, who formed the core of the early Roman populace, and their neighbors, the Falisci and Hernici; the Oscan languages, including the Sabines, who also contributed to early Roman culture, as well as the Samnites, and many other peoples of central and southern Italy; and the Umbrian languages, spoken by the Umbri of the Central Apennines, the rustic Picentes of the Adriatic coast, and the Volsci.

In addition to the Italic peoples was the Etruscan civilization, whose language was unrelated to Indo-European, but who exerted a strong cultural influence throughout much of Italy, including early Rome.

The Italic nomenclature system cannot clearly be attributed to any one of these cultures, but seems to have developed simultaneously amongst each of them, perhaps due to constant contact between them. It first appears in urban centers and thence gradually spread to the countryside. In the earliest period, each person was known by a single name, or nomen. These nomina were monothematic; that is, they expressed a single concept or idea. As populations grew, many individuals might be known by the same name. Unlike the other cultures of Europe, which dealt with this problem by adopting dithematic names (names expressing two ideas), the peoples of Italy developed the first true surnames, or cognomina.

At first these were generally personal names, and might refer to any number of things, including a person's occupation, town of origin, the name of his or her father, or some physical feature or characteristic. But gradually an increasing number of them became hereditary, until they could be used to distinguish whole families from one generation to another. As this happened, the word nomen came to be applied to these surnames, and the original personal name came to be called the praenomen, or "forename", as it was usually recited first. Cognomen came to refer to any other personal or hereditary surnames coming after the family name, and used to distinguish individuals or branches of large families from one another.

As the tria nomina developed throughout Italy, the importance of the praenomen in everyday life declined considerably, together with the number of praenomina in common use. By the first century they were occasionally omitted from public records, and by the middle of the fourth century they were seldom recorded. As the Roman Empire expanded, much of the populace came from cultures with different naming conventions, and the formal structure of the tria nomina became neglected. Various names that were originally nomina or cognomina came to be treated as praenomina, and some individuals used several of them at once. However, some vestiges of the original system survived, and many of the original praenomina have continued into modern times.

Most common praenomina were regularly abbreviated in writing (in speech the full name would always be used). Although some names could be abbreviated multiple ways, the following tables include only the most usual abbreviation, if any, for each name. These abbreviations continue to be used by classical scholars.

== Latin praenomina ==
Each of the Italic peoples had its own distinctive group of praenomina. A few names were shared between cultures, and the Etruscans in particular borrowed many praenomina from Latin and Oscan. It is disputed whether some of the praenomina used by the Romans themselves were of distinctly Etruscan or Oscan origin. However, these names were in general use at Rome and other Latin towns, and were used by families that were certainly of Latin origin. Thus, irrespective of their actual etymology, these names may be regarded as Latin.

=== Masculine names ===
In the early centuries of the Roman Republic, about three dozen praenomina seem to have been in general use at Rome, of which about half were common. This number gradually dwindled to about eighteen praenomina by the first century BC, of which perhaps a dozen were common.

- Agrippa (Agr.)
- Appius (Ap.)
- Aulus (A.)
- Caeso (K.)
- Decimus (D.)
- Faustus (F.)
- Gaius (C.)
- Gnaeus (Cn.)
- Hostus
- Lucius (L.)
- Mamercus (Mam.)
- Manius (ꟿ. or M'.)
- Marcus (M.)
- Mettius
- Nonus
- Numerius (N.)
- Octavius (Oct.)
- Opiter (Opet.)
- Paullus (Paul.)
- Postumus (Post.)
- Proculus (Pro.)
- Publius (P.)
- Quintus (Q.)
- Septimus
- Sertor (Sert.)
- Servius (Ser.)
- Sextus (Sex.)
- Spurius (S.)
- Statius (St.)
- Tiberius (Ti.)
- Titus (T.)
- Tullus
- Vibius (V.)
- Volesus (Vol.)
- Vopiscus (Vop.)

Notes:

- Caeso is frequently (especially in older records) spelled Kaeso. The abbreviation K. was retained to distinguish the name from Gaius, abbreviated "C."
- Gaius and Gnaeus are abbreviated with C. and Cn., respectively, because the practice of abbreviating them was already established by the time the letter G, a modified C, was introduced to the Latin alphabet. Although the archaic spellings Caius and Cnaeus also appear in later records, Gaius and Gnaeus represent the actual pronunciation of these names.
- Manius was originally abbreviated with an archaic five-stroke M (ꟿ), borrowed from the Etruscan alphabet (from which the Latin alphabet was derived) but not otherwise used in Latin. The apostrophe is used as a substitute for this letter.
- Octavius (with an i) seems to be the only form of this name found as a praenomen, although the form Octavus would be consistent with the adjective from which the name is derived.
- Volero, a praenomen used by the Publilii, is believed to be a variant of Volesus.

Some of the praenomina in this list are known from only a few examples. However, the overall sample from which they have been taken represents only a small fraction of the entire Roman populace. The Realencyclopädie der Classischen Altertumswissenschaft mentions about ten thousand individuals whose praenomina are known from surviving works of history, literature, and various inscriptions. These individuals are spread over a period of over twelve centuries, with the smallest sample coming from the early Republic, when the greatest variety of praenomina was in use. During that same period, the sample consists almost entirely of Roman men belonging to the leading patrician families.

Many of the names which were uncommon amongst the patricians appear to have been more widespread amongst the plebeians, and the appearance of rare names in Latin inscriptions outside of Rome suggests that many names which were uncommon at Rome were much more common in other parts of Latium.

=== Feminine names ===
In the earliest period, both men and women used praenomina. However, with the adoption of hereditary surnames, the praenomen lost much of its original importance. The number of praenomina in general use declined steadily throughout Roman history, and as most families used the same praenomina from one generation to the next, the praenomen became less useful for distinguishing between individuals. Women's praenomina gradually fell into disuse, and by the first century the majority of Roman women either did not have or did not use praenomina. A similar process occurred throughout Italy, except amongst the Etruscans, for whom feminine praenomina were the rule.

The abandonment of women's praenomina over time was more the result of practical usage than a deliberate process. Because Latin names had both masculine and feminine forms, the nomen itself was sufficient to distinguish a Roman woman from her father and brothers. Roman women did not change their names when they married, so a Roman wife usually did not share her nomen with any other members of her family. Diminutives, nicknames, and personal cognomina could be used to differentiate between sisters. When there were two sisters, they were frequently referred to as Major and Minor, with these terms appearing after the nomen or cognomen; if there were more than two, the eldest might be called Maxima, and the younger sisters assigned numerical cognomina.

Many of the cognomina used by women originated as praenomina, and for much of Roman history there seems to have been a fashion for "inverting" women's praenomina and cognomina; names that were traditionally regarded as praenomina were often placed after a woman's nomen or cognomen, as if a surname, even though they were used as praenomina. The reverse was also common, especially in imperial times; a personal cognomen would be placed before a woman's nomen, in the place of a praenomen. In both cases, the name was functionally a praenomen, irrespective of its position in the name. For this reason, it is often impossible to distinguish between women's praenomina and personal cognomina.

In imperial times, Roman women were more likely to have praenomina if they had several older sisters. A daughter who had been called simply by her nomen for several years was less likely to receive a praenomen than her younger sisters, and because it was usually easy to distinguish between two daughters without using praenomina, the need for traditional personal names did not become acute until there were at least three sisters in a family. Tertia and Quarta were common praenomina, while Secunda was less common, and Prima rarer still. Maxima, Maio, and Mino were also used as praenomina, although it may be debated whether they represent true personal names. Paulla was probably given to younger daughters, and was one of the most common praenomina.

Most other women's praenomina were simply the feminine forms of familiar masculine praenomina. Examples are known of all common praenomina, as well as a number of less-common ones. Only in the case of praenomina which had irregular masculine forms is there some uncertainty; but these probably became feminine by taking diminutive forms. Caesula or Caesilla appears to have been the feminine form of Caeso, and the personal cognomen Agrippina probably represents the feminine form of Agrippa. Two notable exceptions to the usual formation are Marcia and Titia, both of which regularly formed as "i-stem" nouns, instead of the expected Marca and Tita (although those forms are also found).

Feminine praenomina were usually abbreviated in the same manner as their masculine counterparts, but were often written in full. One notable exception occurs in the filiations of liberti, where the abbreviation "C." for Gaia was frequently reversed to indicate a woman. Here the name "Gaia" seems to have been used generically to represent any woman, although in some instances an inverted "M." for Marcia seems to have been used as well.

The following list includes feminine praenomina which are known or reasonably certain from extant sources and inscriptions, and which were clearly used as praenomina, rather than nicknames or inverted cognomina. Several variations are known for some praenomina, of which only the most regular are given in this table. The abbreviations are usually the same as for the corresponding masculine praenomina; where variation exists, only the most common abbreviation has been provided. A few of these names were normally written in full, or have not been found with regular abbreviations.

- Appia (Ɐp.)
- Aula (Ɐ.)
- Caesula
- Decima (Ɑ.)
- Fausta (ꟻ.)
- Gaia (Ɔ.)
- Gnaea (Ɔn.)
- Hosta (H.)
- Lucia (⅃.)
- Maio (Mai.)
- Mamerca (ꟽam.)
- Mania (ꟽ'.)
- Marcia (ꟽ.)
- Maxima
- Mettia
- Mino (Min.)
- Nona
- Numeria (ᴎ.)
- Octavia (Oct.)
- Paulla
- Postuma (Post.)
- Polla
- Prima
- Procula (ꟼro.)
- Publia (ꟼ.)
- Quarta
- Quinta (Q.)
- Secunda (Seq.)
- Septima
- Servia (Ƨer.)
- Sexta (Ƨex.)
- Spuria (Ƨp.)
- Statia (Ƨt.)
- Tertia
- Tiberia (⊥i.)
- Titia (⊥.)
- Tulla
- Vibia (Ʌ.)
- Volusa (Vol.)
- Vopisca (Vop.)

Notes:

- Maio and Mino are the forms usually found as praenomina, although Major and Minor are also found. As cognomina, Major and Minor seem to have been preferred.
- Secunda was usually abbreviated Seq., although Sec. is also common. In archaic Latin, C was used primarily before E and I, while Q appeared before O and U, and K before A. In a few instances the name is written Sequnda.

=== The meaning of praenomina ===
Philologists have debated the origin and meaning of these names since classical antiquity. However, many of the meanings popularly assigned to various praenomina appear to have been no more than "folk etymology". The names derived from numbers are the most certain. The masculine names Quintus, Sextus, Septimus, Octavius and Decimus, and the feminine names Prima, Secunda, Tertia, Quarta, Quinta, Sexta, Septima, Octavia, Nona and Decima are all based on ordinal numerals. There may also have been a praenomen Nonus, as there was a gens with the apparently patronymic name of Nonius, although no examples of its use as a praenomen have survived.

It has historically been held that these names originally referred to the order of a child's birth, but some scholars have argued that they in fact referred to the month of the Roman calendar in which a child was born. Like the masculine praenomina, the months of the old Roman Calendar had names based on the numbers five through ten: Quintilis (July), Sextilis (August), September, October, November, and December. However, this hypothesis is nuanced, requiring that the feminine praenomina Prima, Secunda, Tertia, and Quarta be explained by birth order and that Septimus, Octavius, and perhaps Nonus fell into disuse as praenomina over time, whilst continuing as gentilician names.

Several other praenomina were believed to refer to the circumstances of a child's birth; for instance, Agrippa was said to refer to a child who was born feet-first; Caeso to a child born by the operation known today as a Caesarean section; Lucius to one born at dawn; Manius to one born in the morning; Numerius to one born easily; Opiter to one whose father had died, leaving his grandfather as head of the family; Postumus to a last-born child (whether or not the father was dead); Proculus to one whose father was far away; Vopiscus to the survivor of twins, the other of whom was born dead. Most of these are not based on credible etymology, although the meanings assigned to Lucius, Manius, and Postumus are probably reasonable.

Amongst other credible meanings assigned to praenomina, Faustus certainly means "fortunate" in Latin; Gaius is thought to derive from the same root as gaudere, "to rejoice"; Gnaeus refers to a birthmark; Marcus and Mamercus refer to the gods Mars and Mamers (perhaps an Oscan manifestation of Mars); Paullus means "small"; Servius appears to be derived from the same root as servare, "to save" or "to keep safe"; Volusus (also found as Volesus and Volero) seems to come from valere, "to be strong".

One popular etymology that is certainly not correct belongs to Spurius, a praenomen that was amongst the most common, and favored by many leading patrician and plebeian families during the early Republic. It was later said that it was a contraction of the phrase, sine pater filius, "son without a father", and thus used for children born out of wedlock. This belief may have led to the gradual disappearance of the name during the first century AD.

Appius is sometimes said to be of Oscan origin, since it is known chiefly from the descendants of Appius Claudius, a Sabine from the town of Cures, who came to Rome in the early years of the Republic, and was admitted to the Patriciate. His original name was said to be Attius Clausus, which he then Romanized. However, the praenomen Appius is known from other Latin sources, and may simply represent the Latin name closest in sound to Attius.

Aulus, Publius, Spurius, and Tiberius are sometimes attributed to Etruscan, in which language they are all common, although these names were also typical of praenomina used in families of indisputably Latin origin, such as the Postumii or the Cornelii. In this instance, it cannot be determined with any certainty whether these were Latin names which were borrowed by the Etruscans, or vice versa. The best case may be for Tiberius being an Etruscan name, since that praenomen was always connected with the sacred river on the boundary of Etruria and Latium, and the Etruscan name for the Tiber was Thebris. However, it still may be that the Romans knew the river by this name when the praenomen came into existence.

=== Historical trends ===
Many families, particularly amongst the great patrician houses, limited themselves to a small number of praenomina, probably as a means of distinguishing themselves from one another and from the plebeians, who used a wider variety of names. For example, the Cornelii used Aulus, Gnaeus, Lucius, Marcus, Publius, Servius, and Tiberius; the Julii limited themselves to Lucius, Gaius, Sextus, and Vopiscus; the Claudii were fond of Appius, Gaius, and Publius; the Postumii favored Aulus, Gaius, Lucius, Publius, and Spurius; and so on. The most prominent plebeian families also tended to limit the names of which they made regular use, although amongst both social classes, there must have been exceptions whenever a family had a large number of sons.

Many families avoided certain names, although the reasons varied. According to legend, the Junii avoided the names Titus and Tiberius because they were the names of two sons of Lucius Junius Brutus, the founder of the Republic, who were executed on the grounds that they had plotted to restore the king to power. Another legend relates that after Marcus Manlius Capitolinus was condemned for treason, the Roman Senate decreed that no member of gens Manlia should bear the praenomen Marcus, a tradition that seems to have been followed until the first century. However, normally such matters were left to the discretion of the family. In most instances, the reason why certain praenomina were preferred and others avoided probably arose from the desire to pass on family names.

Several names were used by only a few patrician families, although they were more widespread amongst the plebeians. For example: Appius was used only by the Claudii, Caeso by the Fabii and the Quinctii, Agrippa by the Furii and the Menenii, Numerius by the Fabii, Mamercus by the Aemilii and the Pinarii, Vopiscus only by the Julii, and Decimus was not used by any patrician family (unless the Junii were, as is sometimes believed, originally patrician), although it was widely used amongst the plebeians.

Throughout Roman history, the most common praenomen was Lucius, followed by Gaius, with Marcus in third place. During the most conservative periods, these three names could account for as much as fifty percent of the adult male population. At some distance were Publius and Quintus, only about half as common as Lucius, distantly followed by Titus. Aulus, Gnaeus, Spurius, Sextus, and Servius were less common, followed by Manius, Tiberius, Caeso, Numerius, and Decimus, which were decidedly uncommon (at least amongst the patricians) during the Republic.

Throughout Republican times, the number of praenomina in general use declined, but older names were occasionally revived by noble families, and occasionally anomalous names such as Ancus, Iulus, or Kanus were given. Some of these may have been ancient praenomina that had already passed out of common use by the early Republic. As they vanished from use as personal names, many older praenomina, such as Agrippa, Faustus, Mamercus, Paullus, Postumus, Proculus, and Vopiscus were revived as cognomina. Other examples of names that may once have been praenomina include Fusus, an early cognomen of gens Furia, and Cossus, a cognomen of gens Cornelia.

By the first century BC, the praenomina remaining in general use at Rome were: Appius, Aulus, Caeso, Decimus, Gaius, Gnaeus, Lucius, Mamercus, Manius, Marcus, Numerius, Publius, Quintus, Servius, Sextus, Spurius, Titus, and Tiberius. However, older names continued to be revived from time to time, especially in noble families, and they probably continued to be used outside Rome. By the second century, several of these names had also passed out of general use at Rome, leaving Aulus, Decimus, Gaius, Gnaeus, Lucius, Manius, Marcus, Numerius, Publius, Quintus, Sextus, Titus, and Tiberius.

Under the empire, confusion seems to have developed as to precisely what constituted a praenomen and how it should be used. A number of emperors considered Imperator as a praenomen, and thus part of their names. As a larger percentage of the Roman populace came from backgrounds that had never used traditional Roman names, the praenomen was frequently omitted, or at least ignored. In its place, an increasing number of magistrates and officials placed common nomina, frequently with praenomen-like abbreviations. The most common of these were Flavius (Fl.), Claudius (Cl.), Julius, Junius, Valerius (Val.), and Aurelius. These names appear almost arbitrarily, much like praenomina, and probably were intended to imply nobility, although ultimately they became so common as to lose any real significance.

== Faliscan praenomina ==
Faliscan has many praenomina in common with Latin, in view of their close relationship. Like Latin, the Falisci also used many names that originated from Etruscan, or from other Italic languages such as Oscan. The revolt of the Falisci in 241 B.C. and their subsequent defeat, which brought about forced resettlement to Falerii Novi, preceded a period of increased Latin influence on the Ager Faliscus, accelerating the displacement of distinctively Faliscan names in favour of increasingly more prestigious Latin ones, as well as the decline of the Faliscan language itself. The following list is non-exhaustive and contains a selection of praenomina which are either of Faliscan origin, emblematic of Faliscan onomastic habits, or otherwise peculiar to the Ager Faliscus.

- Aemus
- Aufilus
- Caesius
- Gavius
- Iantus
- Iuna
- Laevius
- Tirrus
- Vibius
- Volta

Notes:

- Caesius represents a Faliscan form of Latin Caeso.
- Gavius, the most common Faliscsan praenomen, was the equivalent of Latin Gaius; the Latin form also begins to occur frequently in the later period.
- Iuna and Volta are uniquely Faliscan, with the exception of Latin gentilicia derived from them (Voltius and potentially Iunius); after Gavius they were the most popular praenomina among the Falisci.
- Iantus and its feminine counterpart Ianta potentially reflect an otherwise unattested Etruscan praenomen.
- Tirrus, of unknown origin, is also distinctively Faliscan, a single inscription at Praeneste notwithstanding.

== Oscan and Umbrian praenomina ==
Many Oscan praenomina appear throughout Roman history, as the Romans encountered both friendly and hostile tribes, and slowly absorbed the peoples of Italy into their sphere of influence. Umbrian praenomina are less well-known, but appear to have been similar to those of the Oscans. Although it is widely believed that the Latin praenomen Mamercus was of Oscan origin, since Mamers was a Sabine form of Mars, it is not clear to what extent the two cultures (which sprang from the same origin) borrowed praenomina from one another, and to what extent they shared names based on roots common to each language.

It is impossible to provide a complete list of Oscan praenomina, but these names are clearly identifiable in extant histories and inscriptions. Abbreviations do exist for some of them, but they were less regular, and less regularly employed, than the Latin abbreviations.

- Ancus
- Attius
- Decius
- Herius
- Marius
- Mettius
- Minatus
- Minius
- Nerius
- Novius
- Numa
- Numerius
- Ovius
- Paccius
- Pompo
- Salvius
- Seppius
- Statius
- Taurus
- Trebius
- Vibius
- Vettius

Notes:

- The -ius ending found in Latin sources is frequently found as -is or -iis in Oscan inscriptions.
- Ancus is known from only two sources: Ancus Marcius, the fourth King of Rome, who was of Sabine ancestry, and Ancus Publicius, an early member of a plebeian gens.
- Attius may be the Oscan equivalent of the Latin praenomen Appius, since the Sabine Attius Clausus took the name Appius Claudius upon settling at Rome; however, it could also simply have been the closest praenomen in sound.
- Decius, Pompo (and variations thereof), and Seppius are the Oscan equivalents of the Latin praenomina Decimus, Quintus, and Septimus. A 'P' in Oscan frequently corresponded to a 'Q' in Latin.
- Nerius, or Nero, a praenomen common to Oscan and Umbrian, was said to mean fortis ac strenuus, that is, "strong" or "vigorous".

== Etruscan praenomina ==
The Etruscan language was unrelated to the other languages spoken in Italy, and accordingly it contains many names which have no equivalents in the Latin or Oscan languages. The Etruscan civilization, the most advanced of its time in that region, was a strong influence on the other peoples of Italy. The Etruscan alphabet (itself based on an early version of the Western or "Red" Greek alphabet) was the source for later Italian alphabets, including the modern Latin alphabet.

However, the cultural interchange was not all one-way. With respect to personal names, the Etruscans borrowed a large number of praenomina from Latin and Oscan, adding them to their own unique names. The Etruscan language is still imperfectly known, and the number of inscriptions are limited, so this list of Etruscan praenomina encompasses what has been discovered to this point. Included are names that are certainly praenomina, no matter their linguistic origin. Names that might be nomina or cognomina have not been included.

=== Masculine names ===
- Arruns (Ar.)
- Aule (A.)
- Cae (C.)
- Caeles
- Cneve (Cn.)
- Karcuna
- Lar
- Larce
- Laris (Lr.)
- Larth (La., Lth.)
- Lucie (L.)
- Mamarce (Mam.)
- Marce (M.)
- Maximus
- Metie
- Pavle
- Puplie (P.)
- Sethre (Se.)
- Spurie (S.)
- Thefarie
- Tite (T.)
- Uchtave
- Vel (Vl.)
- Velthur (Vth.)
- Vipie (V.)

Notes:

- The Romans rendered Lar, Larce, Laris, and Larth all as Lars.
- Aule, Cae, Cneve, Lucie, Mamarce, Marce, Metie, Pavle, Puplie, Spurie, Tite, Thefarie, Uchtave, and Vipie may be recognized as the Latin praenomina Aulus, Gaius, Gnaeus, Lucius, Mamercus, Marcus, Mettius, Paullus, Publius, Spurius, Titus, Tiberius, Octavius, and Vibius. There is no agreement on whether any of these were borrowed from Etruscan, or whether all were originally Latin.
- The Etruscans used a number of diminutives for both masculine and feminine names, including the masculine names Arnza (from Arruns), Venel, and Venox (from Vel).

=== Feminine names ===
- Fasti (F.)
- Hasti (H.)
- Larthi
- Lethi
- Ramtha (R.)
- Ravnthu
- Tanaquil (Thx.)
- Thana (Th.)
- Titia (T.)
- Vela

Notes:

- Fasti may be borrowed from the Latin praenomen Fausta. Hasti may be a variant of the same name.
- An example of a diminutive of a feminine praenomen is Ravntzu (from Ranvthu).

== See also ==
- Agnomen
- Corpus Inscriptionum Latinarum
