= Orfia gens =

The gens Orfia was a minor plebeian family at Rome. Few members of this gens are mentioned by ancient writers, but others are known from inscriptions. The best-known may be Marcus Orfius, a military tribune who served under the command of Caesar.

== Origin ==
Chase regards the nomen Orfius as the Oscan cognate of the Latin name Orbius, which is derived from the cognomen Orbus, meaning a waif or orphan. He suggests Orfa as the Oscan equivalent of Orbus. An Oscan origin for the family would seem to be supported by the fact that Marcus Orfius was a native of Atella in Campania. The same root would seem to have given rise to the surname Orfitus, found in a number of families, notably the Salvidieni and Cornelii, in imperial times, and to the nomen Orfidius, formed either directly from the cognomen, or perhaps from Orfius using the suffix -idius, sometimes used to form new gentilicia from existing names.

== Praenomina ==
Most of the Orfii used only the most common praenomina, including Gaius, Lucius, and Marcus. There are a few instances of other common praenomina, including Titus, Quintus, and Gnaeus, as well as one instance of Vibius, a much less common name, frequently associated with families of Sabine or Oscan origin.

== Members ==
This list includes abbreviated praenomina. For an explanation of this practice, see filiation.

- Marcus Orfius, an eques from Atella, was a military tribune in Caesar's army, probably during the latter's consulship in 59 BC. Cicero had a high opinion of him, and recommended him to his brother, Quintus, who was serving as one of Caesar's legates.
- Marcus Orfius M. f. M. n. Rufus, a triumvir monetalis auro argento aere flando feriundo (Note: Abbreviated AAAFF, this inscription often found on coins signifies that the triumvir was authorized by the senate to mint coins in gold, silver, and bronze.) during the early years of the empire.
- Orfia, a girl buried at Nemausus in Gallia Narbonensis, aged eleven. Her slaves Attius and Numeria dedicated a monument to her.
- Orfius Cn. f., a speculator (Note: A scout in military service, sometimes appointed to the security detail of Imperial magistrates.) buried at Forum Sempronii in Umbria, aged thirty-five, having served fourteen years.
- Gaius Orfius V. f., named in an inscription from Pinna Vestina in Samnium.
- Lucius Orfius, one of the praetors of Telesia in Samnium.
- Quintus Orfius, named in an inscription from Ostia, dating to the reign of Tiberius.
- Titus Orfius Cn. f., probably the brother of the speculator, in whose funerary inscription he is named.
- Orfius T. l. Anthusa, a freedwoman buried at Rome, the daughter of Titus Orfius Thyrsus and Orfia Daphne.
- Quintus Orfius Asiaticus, buried at Turgalium in Lusitania, aged thirty-six.
- Orfia Attice, named in a libationary inscription from Amiternum in Sabinum.
- Orfia T. l. Daphne, a freedwoman buried at Rome, the wife of Titus Orfius Thyrsus and mother of Orfia Anthusa.
- Quintus Orfius C. f. Florentinus, buried at Musti in Africa Proconsularis.
- Orfia M. f. Fortunata, wife of Lucius Nonius Rogatianus Honoratianus, flamen at Musti during the reign of Macrinus and Diadumenianus, and the mother of Nonius Orfianus and Nonius Fortunatus. The entire family is named in an inscription concerning the donation of some fifteen thousand sestertii.
- Orfius Hermes, the grandfather of Orfia Priscilla.
- Orfia Lucretia, buried at the present site of El Ust, then in Africa Proconsularis, aged thirty.
- Gaius Orfius L. f. Luscinus, prefect and duumvir jure dicundo of a town located at the present site of El Ust, named in an inscription dating to AD 186.
- Lucius Orfius Maximinus, named in a list of the dendrophori (Note: A religious college of carpenters in the service of the Magna Mater. Among their duties was the carrying of the "sacred tree", originally given to the shipbuilders of Troy, hence the name dendrophori, "tree bearers".) under the supervision of the Quindecimviri sacris faciundis at Cumae. From his name, he might be the son of Lucius Orfius Maximus, also listed among the dendrophori.
- Lucius Orfius Maximus, one of the dendrophori at Cumae, and perhaps the father of Lucius Orfius Maximinus.
- Gaius Orfius Paederos, a freed child, buried at Rome, aged six.
- Lucius Orfius Papias, dedicated a monument at Rome to his son, Lucius.
- Lucius Orfius L. f. Papias, buried at Rome.
- Orfia Phryne, a freedwoman buried at Abella in Campania.
- Orfia C. f. Priscilla, donated six thousand sestertii to a school at Ostra in Umbria, in memory of her father, Gaius Orfius Severus, and grandfather, Orfius Hermes.
- Gaius Orfius C. f. Quietus, buried at Musti, aged fifty years, five months.
- Gaius Orfius Severus, the son of Orfius Hermes and father of Orfia Priscilla.
- Lucius Orfius C. f. Severus, buried at Tarquinii, aged twenty-two.
- Orfia Statia, the wife of Helius, (Note: According to the inscription, Orfia and Helius were contubernales, indicating that at least one of them was a slave.) buried at Mactaris in Africa Proconsularis, aged twenty.
- Orfia T. f. Tertulla, buried at Rome.
- Titus Orfius T. l. Thyrsus, a freedman buried at Rome, together with his wife, Orfia Daphne, and daughter, Orfia Anthusa.
- Gaius Orfius M. f. Urbanianus, a soldier third legion, buried at Musti.
- Orfia Vitalis, buried at Puteoli in Campania, aged twenty.
- Orfia Vitilla, the mother of Domitia Juliana, named in a funerary inscription from the present site of Gaureni, then in Moesia Inferior.

== See also ==
- List of Roman gentes

== Bibliography ==
- Marcus Tullius Cicero, Epistulae ad Quintum Fratrem.
- Dictionary of Greek and Roman Biography and Mythology, William Smith, ed., Little, Brown and Company, Boston (1849).
- Dictionary of Greek and Roman Antiquities, William Smith, ed., Little, Brown, and Company, Boston (1859).
- René Cagnat et alii, L'Année épigraphique (The Year in Epigraphy, abbreviated AE), Presses Universitaires de France (1888–present).
- Theodor Mommsen et alii, Corpus Inscriptionum Latinarum (The Body of Latin Inscriptions, abbreviated CIL), Berlin-Brandenburgische Akademie der Wissenschaften (1853–present).
- George Davis Chase, "The Origin of Roman Praenomina", in Harvard Studies in Classical Philology, vol. VIII (1897).
- Harper's Dictionary of Classical Literature and Antiquities, Harry Thurston Peck, ed. (Second Edition, 1897).
- Paul von Rohden, Elimar Klebs, & Hermann Dessau, Prosopographia Imperii Romani (The Prosopography of the Roman Empire, abbreviated PIR), Berlin (1898).
- D.P. Simpson, Cassell's Latin and English Dictionary, Macmillan Publishing Company, New York (1963).
- Azedine Beschaouch, "Mustitana: Recueil des nouvelles inscriptions de Mustis, cité romaine de Tunisie" (A New Collection of Inscriptions from Mustis, a Roman City in Tunisia, abbreviated "IMustis"), in Karthago, vol. XIV, pp. 121–224, Paris (1968).
- Rosanna Friggeri and Carla Pelli, "Vivo e Morto nelle iscrizioni di Roma" (The Living and the Dead in the Inscriptions of Rome, abbreviated "Vivo"), in Miscellanea, pp. 95–172, Rome (1980).
