= Orbia gens =

The gens Orbia was a minor plebeian family at Rome. No members of this gens are known to have held any magistracies, but many of them are known from inscriptions. The most illustrious of the family may have been the jurist Publius Orbius, a contemporary of Cicero.

== Origin ==
The nomen Orbius is derived from the cognomen Orbus, a waif or orphan. It is the cognate of the Sabine or Oscan nomen Orfia. At least two other gentilicia are derived from Orbius using different suffixes: Orbilius using the diminutive suffix -ilius, and Orbicius using the suffix -icius.

== Praenomina ==
The Orbii used a wide variety of praenomina, of which the most important were Marcus and Lucius. The family also used Publius and Titus, and there are few examples of Gaius, Aulus, and Quintus. All of these were very common names throughout Roman history. There is also a single instance of Decimus, a much less common name.

== Members ==
This list includes abbreviated praenomina. For an explanation of this practice, see filiation.

- Orbius, a Roman prefect who defended the island of Delos in 87 BC against Athens during the First Mithridatic War.
- Publius Orbius, a jurist shortly before the time of Cicero, who describes him as an unpracticed advocate, but very learned in the civil law. He was a student of Titus Juventius.
- Publius Orbius, praetor in 65 BC, and governor of Asia the following year.
- Orbius, a wealthy farmer alluded to by Horace.
- Orbius Laetianus, subpraefectus of the Vigiles in AD 191.
- Aulus Orbius, named in two inscriptions from Praeneste in Latium.
- Lucius Orbius, named in an inscription from Tibur in Samnium.
- Lucius Orbius L. f., the husband of Tullia, named in an inscription from Rome.
- Lucius Orbius M. f., a schoolmaster named in a dedicatory inscription from the island of Tenos in Achaea.
- Lucius Orbius M. f., named in an inscription from the island of Delos in Achaea, perhaps the same identified as magister Italiceis in another inscription.
- Marcus Orbius, named in an inscription from Rome.
- Marcus Orbius, named in an inscription at Lambaesis in Numidia, dating to the reign of Septimius Severus.
- Marcus Orbius M. f., a native of Aquae Sextiae in Gallia Narbonensis, was a lieutenant stationed at Rome some time in the late second or early third century.
- Marcus Orbius, named in an inscription from Casinum in Latium.
- Marcus Orbius, Decurion of the colony at Ostia, buried in a family sepulchre at Ostia, together with his wife, Januaria, and daughter, Orbia Januaria, dedicated by his son, Marcus Orbius Protogenes.
- Titus Orbius L. f., dedicated a basilica to the people of Tibur.
- Orbia Acume, a freedwoman mentioned in three funerary inscriptions at Rome.
- Marcus Orbius Agrypnus, buried at Interamna Lirenas in Latium.
- Orbia L. f. Aphrodisia, daughter of Lucius Orbius Verinus, buried at the present site of Monte San Giusto, then in Picenum.
- Gaius Orbius Asellio, the patron of Gaius Orbius Cosmus and Gaius Orbius Phronimus.
- Lucius Orbius Caelianus, named in an inscription from Lambaesis.
- Lucius Orbius L. l. Colo, a freed child buried at Rome, aged eight.
- Gaius Orbius Cosmo, buried at Pola in the province of Venetia et Histria, was one of the clients of Gaius Orbius Asellio.
- Orbius Crescens, buried at Castellum Celtianum in Numidia, aged forty.
- Quintus Orbius Dionysius, buried at Castrimoenium in Latium.
- Aulus Orbius A. l. Eros, a freedman named in an inscription from Praeneste.
- Orbius Eutychus, named in an inscription from Ostia.
- Orbius Faustinus, named in a list of shipbuilders at Portus in Latium.
- Marcus Orbius Faustus, buried in a family sepulchre at Rome.
- Orbius Fortunatus, named in a list of shipbuilders at Portus.
- Lucius Orbius Felix, a tribune in the second legion at Lambaesis.
- Marcus Orbius M. f. Felix, a soldier in the ninth urban cohort at Rome, in AD 197.
- Marcus Orbius Felix, named in a dedicatory inscription from Thuburbo Maius in Africa Proconsularis.
- Quintus Orbius Felix, named in an inscription from Ostia, dating to between AD 101 and 130.
- Lucius Orbius L. l. Galata, a freedman mentioned in three funerary inscriptions from Rome.
- Lucius Orbius L. f. Gallus, named in an inscription from Rome.
- Orbia L. l. Helena, a freedwoman buried at Rome.
- Marcus Orbius Helius, dedicated a tomb at Rome for his dear friend, Titus Flavius Eutychius.
- Lucius Orbius Italicus, named in an inscription from Aquileia in Venetia et Histria, dating from AD 376 to 425.
- Orbia M. f. Januaria, daughter of Marcus Orbius and Januaria, with whom she was buried in the family sepulchre at Ostia.
- Marcus Orbius Januarius, buried at Simitthus in Africa Proconsularis, aged one hundred and ten, according to the inscription.
- Decimus Orbius Martialis, a member of the fifth cohort of Vigiles at Rome in AD 202.
- Lucius Orbius Mercurio, named in an inscription from Delos.
- Orbia M. l. Nympha, a freedwoman buried at Interamna Lirenas in Latium.
- Lucius Orbius Orbianus, husband of Aelia Martilla, buried at the present site of Mechta el Oussera, then in Numidia, aged fifty-five.
- Gaius Orbius Phronimus, one of the clients of Gaius Orbius Aseillio.
- Orbia Primigenia, buried in a family sepulchre at Rome.
- Marcus Orbius M. l. Principis, a freedman and baker, buried at Interamna Lirenas.
- Marcus Orbius M. f. Protogenes, dedicated a family sepulchre at Ostia for his parents, Marcus Orbius and Januaria, and sister, Orbia Januaria.
- Lucius Orbius Provincialis, named in a list of soldiers at Lambaesis.
- Orbius Puteolanus, named in a list of shipbuilders at Portus.
- Orbia Restituta, the sister of Publius Orbius Rusticus, buried at Emerita Augusta in Lusitania.
- Quintus Orbius Rufus, buried at Rome, aged sixty-five.
- Publius Orbius Rusticus, the brother of Orbia Retituta, buried at Emerita Augusta.
- Marcus Orbius Scapula, dedicated a monument to one Onesimus at Portus.
- Titus Orbius T. f. Severus, named in an inscription from Apta in Gallia Narbonensis.
- Titus Orbius T. f. Tuscus, named in a funerary inscription from Verona in Venetia et Histria.
- Lucius Orbius Verinus, built a tomb for his daughter, Orbia Aphrodisia, at the present site of Monte San Giusto in Picenum.

== See also ==
- List of Roman gentes

== Bibliography ==
- Marcus Tullius Cicero, Brutus, Pro Flacco.
- Quintus Horatius Flaccus (Horace), Epistulae.
- Dictionary of Greek and Roman Biography and Mythology, William Smith, ed., Little, Brown and Company, Boston (1849).
- Theodor Mommsen et alii, Corpus Inscriptionum Latinarum (The Body of Latin Inscriptions, abbreviated CIL), Berlin-Brandenburgische Akademie der Wissenschaften (1853–present).
- Giovanni Battista de Rossi, Inscriptiones Christianae Urbis Romanae Septimo Saeculo Antiquiores (Christian Inscriptions from Rome of the First Seven Centuries, abbreviated ICUR), Vatican Library, Rome (1857–1861, 1888).
- René Cagnat et alii, L'Année épigraphique (The Year in Epigraphy, abbreviated AE), Presses Universitaires de France (1888–present).
- George Davis Chase, "The Origin of Roman Praenomina", in Harvard Studies in Classical Philology, vol. VIII (1897).
- Paul von Rohden, Elimar Klebs, & Hermann Dessau, Prosopographia Imperii Romani (The Prosopography of the Roman Empire, abbreviated PIR), Berlin (1898).
- Stéphane Gsell, Inscriptions Latines de L'Algérie (Latin Inscriptions from Algeria, abbreviated ILAlg), Edouard Champion, Paris (1922–present).
- Hilding Thylander, Inscriptions du port d'Ostie (Inscriptions from the Port of Ostia, abbreviated IPOstie), Acta Instituti Romani Regni Sueciae, Lund (1952).
- T. Robert S. Broughton, The Magistrates of the Roman Republic, American Philological Association (1952).
- D.P. Simpson, Cassell's Latin and English Dictionary, Macmillan Publishing Company, New York (1963).
- John G. F. Hind, "Mithridates", in J. A Crook, Andrew Lintott, Elizabeth Rawson, The Cambridge Ancient History, vol. IX, The Last Age of the Roman Republic, 146–43 B.C., Cambridge University Press, 1992, pp. 165–207. ISBN 0521256038
- Hispania Epigraphica (Epigraphy of Spain, abbreviated HEp), Madrid (1989–present).
- Giovanni Battista Brusin, Inscriptiones Aquileiae (Inscriptions of Aquileia, abbreviated InscrAqu), Udine (1991–1993).
- Carlo Molle, “Varia epigraphica dalla valle del Liri”, in Heikki Solin, Le Epigrafi della Valle di Comino, Atti del dodicesimo convegno epigrafico cominese (“Miscellaneous Epigraphy from the Liri Valley”, in Heikki Solin's The Epigraphy of the Valley of Comino, Proceedings of the Twelfth Epigraphic Conference at Comino), pp. 91–116, San Donato Val di Comino (2016).
