= Minidia gens =

Plebeian family at ancient Rome

The gens Minidia was an obscure plebeian family at Rome. Two are known to have been admitted to the Roman Senate. Otherwise, they are known chiefly from the writings of Cicero and Vitruvius, as well as a number of inscriptions.

== Members ==
- Minidia, the name of two women named in an inscription from Vicetia in Venetia et Histria.
- Lucius Minidius, a merchant or banker at Elis, married a woman named Oppia. In 46 BC, Cicero had some financial transactions with Minidius' heirs, including his brother, Marcus.
- Marcus Minidius, a Roman merchant at Elis, with whom Cicero was involved in a lawsuit.
- Publius Minidius, (Note: Sometimes amended to "Numidius", "Numidicus", or "Numisius".) a soldier who served alongside Vitruvius in Caesar's army.
- Lucius Minidius, the master of Stolia, a slave named in an inscription from Minturnae in Latium.
- Lucius Minidius Proculi f., named in an inscription from Vicetia.
- Gaius Minidius Primigenius, buried at Risinium in Dalmatia, aged forty years.
- Gaius Minidius, the former master of Gaius Minidius Hieronymus.
- Gaius Minidius Hieronymus, a freedman named in an inscription from Narona in Dalmatia.
- Gaius Minidius, the former master of Minidia Homilia.
- Proculus Minidius, the father of Lucius Minidius, named in an inscription from Vicetia.
- Minidius . . . alis, named in an inscription from Vicetia.
- Minidia Homilia, a freedwoman, wife of Quintus Julius Hilarius, and mother of Minidia Merope, built a family sepulchre at Ostia Antica in Latium.
- Minidia Merope, daughter of Minidia Homilia, buried with her family at Ostia.
- Minidia Quintina, buried at Lissus in Dalmatia, aged thirty.

== See also ==
- List of Roman gentes
- Mindia gens

== Bibliography ==
- Marcus Tullius Cicero, Epistulae ad Familiares.
- Marcus Vitruvius Pollio, De Architectura (On Architecture).
- Dictionary of Greek and Roman Biography and Mythology, William Smith, ed., Little, Brown and Company, Boston (1849).
- Paul von Rohden, Elimar Klebs, & Hermann Dessau, Prosopographia Imperii Romani (The Prosopography of the Roman Empire, abbreviated PIR), Berlin (1898).
- René Cagnat et alii, L'Année épigraphique (The Year in Epigraphy, abbreviated AE), Presses Universitaires de France (1888–present).
- Bruna Forlati Tamaro, La basilica dei santi Felice e Fortunato in Vicenza (The Basilica of Saints Felix and Fortunatus in Vicenza), Band 2, Vicenza (1979).
