= List of Roman governors of Bithynia and Pontus =

This is a list of governors of the Roman province of Bithynia and Pontus:

== As a Senatorial province ==
- Gaius Papirius Carbo (61—59 BC);
- Gaius Memmius (57—56 BC);
- Gaius Caecilius Cornutus (56 BC);
- Publius Silius (51 BC);
- Aulus Plautius (49—48 BC);
- Gaius Vibius Pansa Caetronianus (47/46 BC);
- Quintus Marcius Crispus (45 BC);
- Lucius Tillius Cimber (44 BC);
- Gnaeus Domitius Ahenobarbus (40—34 BC);
- Thorius Flaccus (29/28 — 28/27 BC);
- Appius Claudius Pulcher (27/26 BC);
- Gaius Marcius Censorinus (c. 14/13 BC);
- Lucius Licinius C[...] (c. AD 11/12);
- Manius Ota[cilius Crassus?] (reign of Augustus?);
- Marcus Granius Marcellus (AD 14/15);
- Publius Vitellius (AD 17/18);
- Lucius Mindius Balbus (c. 43–47);
- Gaius Cadius Rufus (47/48);
- Publius Pasidienus Firmus (48/49 — 49/50);
- Lucius Mindius Pollio (after 42);
- Lucius Dunius Severus (after 42);
- Attius Laco (54/55?);
- Marcus Tarquitius Priscus (59/60?);
- Petronius Niger (between 62 and 69);
- Lucius Venuleius Montanus (c. 63);
- Marcus Plancius Varus (70/71? or 71/72?);
- Marcus Maecius Rufus (c. 71/72 or 72/73);
- Marcus Salvidienus Proculus (c. 75/76);
- Marcus Salvidienus Asprenas (c. 76/77);
- Velius Paulus (c. 79/80);
- Lucius Minicius Rufus (81/82?);
- Aulus Bucius Lappius Maximus (82/83?);
- Tiberius Julius Celsus Polemaeanus (c. 83/84);
- Lucius Julius Marinus (88/89 or 89/90);
- Tullius Justus (96/97);
- Gaius Julius Bassus (101/102?);
- Varenus Rufus (105/106);
- Anicius Maximus (before 108/109);
- Publius Severus Calvus (108/109);
- Pliny the Younger (Gaius Plinius Caecilius Secundus) (c. 109 — 111);
- Gaius Julius Cornutus Tertullus (111 — 114/115?);
- Quintus Cornelius Senecio Annianus (reign of Hadrian)
- Gaius Julius Severus (134)
- Quintus Voconius Saxa Fidus (142/143 ?)
- Lucius Coelius Festus (146/147 ?)
- Lucius Hedius Rufus Lollianus Avitus (159)
- Marcus Roscius Murena (c. 161/162)

== As an Imperial province ==
- Lucius Albinius Saturninus (c. 180)
- Severus (before 183)
- Marcus Didius Severus Julianus (between 186 and 189)
- Lucius Fabius Cilo (193/194)
- Marcus Silius Messala (between 193 and 197)
- Quintus Tineius Sacerdos (198/199)
- Marcus Cl(audius) Demetrius (between 199 and 217)
- Tiberius Claudius Callipianus Italicus (between 202 and 205)
- Aelius Antipater (after 204)
- Gaius Claudius Attalus Paterculianus (between 193 and 214)
- Caecilius Aristo (215/216 ? - 217/218)
- (Claudius Aelius ?) Pollio (c. 218)
- Lucius Egnatius Victor Lollianus (between 230 and 235)
- Marcus Aurelius Artemidorus (245/246 - 247/248)
- Velleius Macrinus (c. 269)

== See also ==
- Lists of ancient Roman governors
