= Orbilia gens =

The gens Orbilia was an obscure plebeian family of ancient Rome. None of its members are known to have held any magistracies. Its most famous representative may have been the grammarian Lucius Orbilius Pupillus, who operated a school at Rome, and was the master of Horace.

== Origin ==
The nomen Orbilius belongs to a class of gentilicia formed from other names, in this instance the Latin nomen Orbius, using the diminutive suffix -ilius. Orbius is derived from the cognomen Orbus, a waif or orphan.

== Members ==
This list includes abbreviated praenomina. For an explanation of this practice, see filiation.

- Lucius Orbilius Pupillus, the grammarian, was a native of Beneventum, opened a school at Rome during the consulship of Cicero, in 63 BC. He was well-reputed, but obtained the surname Plagosus from his students due to his frequent floggings. He was fifty when he came to Rome, and lived almost to one hundred. He wrote a treatise which has been lost. (Note: The name appears as Perialogos in Suetonius, for which Franciscus van Oudendorp proposed Paedagogus, and Johann August Ernesti proposed Periautlogos.)
- Orbilius L. f., son of the grammarian, who followed in his father's footsteps and operated a school at Rome.
- Lucius Orbilius L. l. Hilario, a freedman buried at Rome.

== See also ==
- List of Roman gentes

== Bibliography ==
- Quintus Horatius Flaccus (Horace), Epistulae.
- Gaius Suetonius Tranquillus, De Illustribus Grammaticis (The Illustrious Grammarians).
- Ambrosius Theodosius Macrobius, Saturnalia.
- Dictionary of Greek and Roman Biography and Mythology, William Smith, ed., Little, Brown and Company, Boston (1849).
- Notizie degli Scavi di Antichità (News of Excavations from Antiquity, abbreviated NSA), Accademia dei Lincei (1876–present).
- George Davis Chase, "The Origin of Roman Praenomina", in Harvard Studies in Classical Philology, vol. VIII (1897).
- Paul von Rohden, Elimar Klebs, & Hermann Dessau, Prosopographia Imperii Romani (The Prosopography of the Roman Empire, abbreviated PIR), Berlin (1898).
- D.P. Simpson, Cassell's Latin and English Dictionary, Macmillan Publishing Company, New York (1963).
