= Gaius Fabius Agrippinus =

Gaius Fabius Agrippinus was a Roman senator active in the mid-second century AD, who held a number of offices in the emperor's service. Agrippinus served as suffect consul for the nundinium October-December 148 with Marcus Antonius Zeno as his colleague. A remarkable commonality between Agrippinus and his colleague Zeno is that they were also consecutive governors of Thracia: Géza Alföldy dates Zeno's tenure from around the year 140 to about 143, and Agrippinus' from 143 to about 146.

The origins of Agrippinus lie in the port city of Ostia, where his family is known to have owned a house. Here a couple of fragmentary inscriptions have been found that offer the first steps of a cursus honorum that has been connected to Agrippinus, but Anthony Birley admits that these might apply to a homonymous descendant mentioned by Cassius Dio who was governor of Roman Syria in 218 or 219.

The testimony of these stones are as follows. He began as one of the quattuorviri viarum curandarum which oversaw road maintenance within the city of Rome, one of the four boards that comprised the vigintiviri. Serving as one of these minor magistracies was considered an important first step in a senator's career. Next was service as a military tribune with Legio II Augusta, which was stationed in Roman Britain at the time. Agrippinus is then documented as quaestor of the public province of Roman Cyprus, which qualified him to be a senator, which is followed by the magistracies of aedile cerialis then praetor, where our material ends.

Nothing further is known of Agrippinus after his consulate.

Political offices
Preceded by Lucius Coelius Festus, and Publius Orfidius Senecio as suffect consuls	Suffect consul of the Roman Empire; 148 with Marcus Antonius Zeno	Succeeded by Lucius Sergius Salvidienus Scipio Orfitus, and Quintus Pompeius Sosius Priscus as ordinary consuls
