= Lucius Coelius Festus =

Roman Senator

Lucius Coelius Festus was a Roman senator, who was appointed to several praetorian offices during the reign of Antoninus Pius. He was suffect consul in the nundinium of July-September 148 with Publius Orfidius Senecio as his colleague. Mireille Corbier describes his known career as that of an administrator occupying a modest spot in the Senate. Festus is known entirely from inscriptions.

Festus was originally of the equestrian class, but apparently was adlected into the Senate inter tribunicos at the end of the reign of Hadrian. The praetorian portion of his cursus honorum is recorded on an inscription erected at Veleia by the city council to celebrate his patronage. After achieving the praetorship, Festus was appointed prefectus frumenti dandi ex Senatus consultum. This was followed by his appointment as juridicus for Asturia and Callaecia. Géza Alföldy notes he was one of three men who held this position in a narrow period: Alföldy arranges the three putting Lucius Novius Crispinus (later suffect consul around 150) first, then was replaced by Festus around the year 138, and three years later was in turn replaced by Quintus Fuficius Cornutus (later suffect consul in 147).

Once back in Rome he served as prefectus of the aerarium Saturni or Senate treasury, which he held for three years; Corbier dates his tenure from the year 141 to 143 with Publius Mummius Sisenna Rutilianus as his colleague. The last office Festus held before acceding to the consulate was as governor of Bithynia and Pontus, which Alföldy dates to the term 146/147; Bernard Rémy concurs with this date.

His life after his consulate is a blank.

Political offices
Preceded by Satyrius Firmus, and Gaius Salvius Capito as suffect consuls	Suffect consul of the Roman Empire; 148 with Publius Orfidius Senecio	Succeeded by Gaius Fabius Agrippinus, and Marcus Antonius Zeno as ordinary consuls
