= Orfidia gens =

The gens Orfidia was a minor plebeian family at Rome. Only a few members of this gens occur in history, but others are mentioned in inscriptions. The most illustrious of the Orfidii was probably Publius Orfidius Senecio, consul suffectus in AD 148.

== Origin ==
The nomen Orfidius appears to belong to a class of gentilicia formed from other names using the suffix -idius. In this instance, the name was probably formed from the nomen Orfius, or perhaps the cognomen Orfitus, both of which are probably derived from the Oscan cognate of the Latin Orbus, a waif or orphan.

== Members ==
This list includes abbreviated praenomina. For an explanation of this practice, see filiation.

- Gaius Orfidius Benignus, legate of the Legio I Adiutrix under the emperor Otho in AD 69. His soldiers had never been in battle before, but inflicted heavy losses upon the Legio XXI Rapax, fighting for Vitellius near Bedriacum, before being driven back. Orfidius was slain in the battle.
- Gaius Orfidius Benignus, overseer of a farm, buried at Nursia in Samnium.
- Gaius Orfidius C. f. Benignus Juventianus, theocolus (Note: From Greek θεοκολος, a type of priest employed by a few Roman cults, including that of Jupiter Capitolinus, as observed at Corinth.) of Jupiter Capitolinus at Corinth.
- Publius (Orfidius) P. f. Anniolenus Epagathus, (Note: Rendered Hepagatus in the inscription.) the son of Publius Orfidius Epagathus and Anniolena Primigenia, buried at Peltuinum in Samnium, aged nineteen.
- Gaius Orfidius C. l. Castus, a freedman named in an inscription from Pitinum Mergens in Umbria.
- Orfidia Sex. C. l. Certa, a freedwoman named in an inscription from Aufinum.
- Publius Orfidius Epagathus, husband of Anniolena Primigenia, and father of Publius Anniolenus Epagathus, buried at Peltuinum.
- (Orfidius) Gemellus, dedicated a monument at Nursia to his brother, Gaius Orfidius Benignus.
- Orfidia Procula, named in an inscription from Aufinum in Samnium, may be connected with the legate Gaius Orfidius Benignus.
- Orfidius C. f. Proculus, dedicated a monument to his father at the present site of Karaağaç, Edirne, then in Asia.
- Publius Orfidius Senecio, legatus pro praetore at Ulpia Trajana in Dacia; an inscription from Germisara Castra indicates that he was in command of a detachment of soldiers from the Legio XIII Gemina. He is probably the same man as the consul of AD 148.
- Publius Orfidius Senecio, consul suffectus in AD 148.
- Gaius Orfidius Stratocles, the father of Proculus, buried at the present site of Karaağaç.

== See also ==
- List of Roman gentes

== Bibliography ==
- Publius Cornelius Tacitus, Historiae.
- Plutarchus, Lives of the Noble Greeks and Romans.
- Theodor Mommsen et alii, Corpus Inscriptionum Latinarum (The Body of Latin Inscriptions, abbreviated CIL), Berlin-Brandenburgische Akademie der Wissenschaften (1853–present).
- René Cagnat et alii, L'Année épigraphique (The Year in Epigraphy, abbreviated AE), Presses Universitaires de France (1888–present).
- Paul von Rohden, Elimar Klebs, & Hermann Dessau, Prosopographia Imperii Romani (The Prosopography of the Roman Empire, abbreviated PIR), Berlin (1898).
- George Davis Chase, "The Origin of Roman Praenomina", in Harvard Studies in Classical Philology, vol. VIII (1897).
- D.P. Simpson, Cassell's Latin and English Dictionary, Macmillan Publishing Company, New York (1963).
- Corinth: The Inscriptions 1926–1950, Princeton (1966).
- Zeitschrift für Papyrologie und Epigraphik (Journal of Papyrology and Epigraphy, abbreviated ZPE), (1987).
