= Urbicia gens =

Ancient Roman family

The gens Urbicia was an obscure plebeian family at ancient Rome. Almost no members of this gens are mentioned in history, but a number are known from inscriptions.

== Origin ==
The nomen Urbicius belongs to a class of gentilicia formed from cognomina ending in -ex, -icis, or -icus. The surname Urbicus originally designated someone who dwelt in a city, or urbs, and is an example of a cognomen derived from the traits associated with an individual. Urbicius must be distinguished from Orbicius, with which it was sometimes confused.

== Praenomina ==
The only praenomina attested from inscriptions of this gens are Marcus and Gaius, two of the most common names at all periods of Roman history.

== Members ==
- Marcus Urbicius Sanctus, mentioned in two first-century soapstone inscriptions from Epamanduodurum in Germania Superior.
- Urbicius Respectus, buried at Rome, aged thirty-seven years, two months, and seven days, in a tomb dating between the middle of the first century and the end of the second, dedicated by his wife, Xenara.
- Marcus Urbicius Faventinus Ipolcobulculensis, buried in a second-century tomb at Ipolcobulcula in Hispania Baetica, aged forty-five.
- Marcus Urbicius Rusticus Ipolcobulculensis, buried in a second century tomb at Ipolcobulcula, aged forty.
- Urbicius Flaccus, made an offering to Apollo, commemorated in an inscription from the site of modern Essarois, formerly part of Gallia Belgica, dating from the second or third century.
- Urbicius Spectatus, built a sepulchre at Apulum in Dacia, dating between the middle of the second century and the latter part of the third, for his children, Gaius Urbicius Condunus, Urbicia Ingenua, and Urbicius Senilis.
- Gaius Urbicius Condunus, a soldier in the Legio XIII Gemina, buried at Apulum, aged thirty, having served for eleven years, in a sepulchre dating between the middle of the second century and the latter part of the third, built by his father, Urbicius Spectatus, for Condunus and his other children.
- Urbicia Ingenua, a young woman buried at Apulum, aged twenty, in a sepulchre dating between the middle of the second century and the latter part of the third, built by her father, Urbicius Spectatus, for Ingenua and her brothers.
- Urbicius Senilis, a boy buried at Apulum, aged ten, in a sepulchre dating between the middle of the second century and the latter part of the third, built by his father, Urbicius Spectatus, for Senilis and his siblings.
- Gaius Urbicius Firmus, decurion of Siscia in Pannonia Superior, where he was buried in a tomb dating from the reign of Septimius Severus.
- Urbicia, the mother of a child buried at Augusta Treverorum in Gallia Belgica on the tenth day before the Kalends of November in an unspecified year between the late fourth century and the end of the fifth, aged two years, four months, and five days.

=== Undated Urbicii ===
- Urbicia, a woman buried at Aquileia in Venetia and Histria.
- Urbicius, an authority on the organization of the army, should probably be read Orbicius.

== See also ==
- List of Roman gentes

== Bibliography ==
- Dictionary of Greek and Roman Biography and Mythology, William Smith, ed., Little, Brown and Company, Boston (1849).
- Theodor Mommsen et alii, Corpus Inscriptionum Latinarum (The Body of Latin Inscriptions, abbreviated CIL), Berlin-Brandenburgische Akademie der Wissenschaften (1853–present).
- Charlton T. Lewis and Charles Short, A Latin Dictionary, Clarendon Press, Oxford (1879).
- René Cagnat et alii, L'Année épigraphique (The Year in Epigraphy, abbreviated AE), Presses Universitaires de France (1888–present).
- George Davis Chase, "The Origin of Roman Praenomina", in Harvard Studies in Classical Philology, vol. VIII, pp. 103–184 (1897).
- Instrumenta Inscripta, No. 5: Signacula ex aere: Aspetti epigrafici, archeoligici, giuridici, prosopografici, collezionistici, Rome (2014).
