= Gaius Prastina Messalinus =

2nd century Roman senator, consul and governor

Gaius Prastina Messalinus was a Roman senator, active during the reign of Antoninus Pius. He was consul in the year 147 with Lucius Annius Largus as his colleague. Messalinus is known entirely from inscriptions.

An item of interest is his cognomen "Messalinus", which suggests a connection to one branch of the gens Valeria. His full name was thought to have been "Gaius Ulpius Pacatus Prastina Messalinus". Géza Alföldy dismissed the possibility that Messalinus was the descendant of a man given Roman citizenship during the reign of the emperor Trajan, and instead argued that Messalinus was a relative of that emperor. However, the names "Ulpius Pacatus" were ascribed to Messalinus in error.

The cursus honorum of Messalinus is imperfectly known; besides his consulate, only two imperial appointments are known. The first was before his consulate, when he was appointed governor of Numidia; Alföldy dates his tenure to the years 143, 145, and 146. The second appointment was after his consulate, as governor of the imperial province of Lower Moesia, a post attested by a military diploma dated to between the years 145 and 157.

Alföldy dismissed identifying Messalinus with the Pacatus who was governor of Gallia Lugdunensis at some point between the years 138 and 161. A possible descendant is the governor of Lower Moesia in 244, Gaius Prastina Messalinus.

Messalinus' life is a blank after his term in Lower Moesia.

Political offices
Preceded by Lucius Aemilius Longus, and Quintus Cornelius Proculus as suffect consuls	Consul of the Roman Empire; 147 with Lucius Annius Largus	Succeeded by Aulus Claudius Charax, and Quintus Fuficius Cornutus as suffect consuls
