= Quintus Fuficius Cornutus =

2nd century Roman senator, consul and governor

Quintus Fuficius Cornutus was a Roman senator active in the first half of the second century AD, who held a number of offices in the emperor's service. He was suffect consul for the nundinium April-June AD 147 with Aulus Claudius Charax as his colleague. Cornutus is known only from inscriptions.

== Career ==
His cursus honorum can be reconstructed from an incomplete inscription found at Casalbordino, near Vasto in Italy. The location of this monument led Géza Alföldy to surmise that Cornutus' home was at this village, or neighboring Frentanum where Cornutus was known to own estates. Restoration of the inscription assumes it recorded which of the four boards of the vigintiviri Cornutus held, namely the quattuorviri viarum curandarum, which oversaw the maintenance of the roads of the city of Rome. More certain is that he was a military tribune, and that while holding that commission Cornutus saw combat where his achievements led to him being awarded dona militaria, or military decorations. However, where he saw combat, and with which unit, is not known; the part of the inscription containing that information is missing. Valerie Maxfield lists two possible occasions on which this could have happened: "the bellum Iudaicum of A.D. 132-5 in which C. Popilius Carus Pedo, consul the same year as Cornutus, was decorated"; or the expeditio Britannica during the governorship of Quintus Lollius Urbicus. Anthony Birley is rather doubtful that Cornutus participated in the Jewish War, noting that Hadrian "was notably ungenerous with dona for the Jewish war."

Enough of the inscription survives to attest that Cornutus was the imperial candidate for the Republican magistracies of plebeian tribune and praetor; Alföldy dates the last office to no later than 138, while Maxfield dates it to around 137. Being the candidate of the emperor was an important honor. Once he stepped down from the praetorship, Cornutus was appointed juridicus for Asturia and Callaecia. Alföldy notes he was one of three men who held this position in a narrow period: Alföldy arranges the three putting Lucius Novius Crispinus (later suffect consul around 150) first, who was replaced by Lucius Coelius Festus, and who was in turn replaced by Cornutus around the year 140; Cornutus is surmised to have remained in this appointment for three years.

Cornutus received a commission as legatus legionis or commander of a legion whose name is lost, but appears to have been stationed in one of the two Moesian provinces; Alföldy dates his commission from about 142 to 144, while Maxfield offers the dates of about 141 to 143. This was followed by his governorship of the imperial province of Pannonia Inferior, which he held from the year 144 to 147. Upon returning to Rome, Cornutus acceded to the consulate.

The only office Cornutus is known to have held after his consulate was governor of Moesia Inferior, which he held from c. 151 to c. 153/154.

Political offices
Preceded by Gaius Prastina Messalinus, and Lucius Annius Largus as consules ordinarii	Suffect consul of the Roman Empire; 147 with Aulus Claudius Charax	Succeeded by Cupressenus Gallus, and Quintus Cornelius Quadratus as consules suffecti
