= Prosopography of ancient Rome =

Scholarly approach to ancient Roman history focusing on social networks

The prosopography of ancient Rome is an approach to classical studies and ancient history that focuses on family connections, political alliances, and social networks in ancient Rome. The methodology of Roman prosopography involves defining a group for study—often the social ranking called ordo in Latin, as of senators and equestrians—then collecting and analyzing data. Literary sources provide evidence mainly for the ruling elite. Epigraphy and papyrology are sources that may also document ordinary people, who have been studied in groups such as imperial freedmen, lower-class families, and specific occupations such as wet nurses (nutrices).

In German scholarship, Friedrich Münzer's many biographical articles for Realencyclopädie der Classischen Altertumswissenschaft took a prosopographical approach. Matthias Gelzer, one of the founders of prosopographical methodology in relation to ancient Rome, focused on the social institution of patronage and its effects on the Roman political system.

Leading 20th-century scholars who wrote in English on the prosopography of the Roman Republic include T.R.S. Broughton, whose three-volume The Magistrates of the Roman Republic is a standard reference; Ronald Syme, whose Roman Revolution (1939) became the basis for later scholars' work on the late Republic and the transition to the Principate; T.P. Wiseman, who has studied in particular the careers and family lines of Romans from the municipia, towns outside Rome; E. Badian, particularly his 1965 work on the trial of Gaius Norbanus; Lily Ross Taylor; and Erich Gruen.

Other scholars, such as P.A. Brunt, have cautioned against an overreliance on prosopography, particularly the tendency to see court trials as "proxy wars" between political factions rather than as judicial proceedings in pursuit of just outcomes: even bitter enemies such as Cicero and Clodius Pulcher are recorded as testifying on behalf of the same party.

== See also ==
- Prosopography of the Later Roman Empire
- Prosopographia Imperii Romani
