= Quintus Voconius Saxa Fidus =

Quintus Voconius Saxa Fidus was a Roman senator, who was active during middle of the second century. He was suffect consul in the nundinium September-October 146 with Gaius Annianus Verus as his colleague. He is known almost entirely from inscriptions; Voconius is mentioned once in Ulpian's Liber octavus de officio proconsulis.

Ronald Syme observes that the nomen gentilicum Voconius appears 14 times in the volumes of Corpus Inscriptionum Latinarum containing inscriptions from Gallia Narbonensis and the Spanish provinces; there is also the place-name "Forum Voconi" in Gallia Narbonesis. One the other hand, Bernard Rémy infers Voconius has his origins in Italy, since his tribe, Romula, is not found outside of that region.

== Life ==
His cursus honorum is known from two inscriptions: one in Greek set up at Phaselis in Lycia, the other in Latin erected in Perge. Voconius began his career as one of the decemviri stlitibus judicandis, one of the four boards that form the vigintiviri; membership in one of these boards was a required first step toward gaining entry into the Roman Senate. Next, as a military tribune, he was assigned to two different legions: first to Legio III Cyrenaica, then to Legio XII Fulminata; Bernard Remy dates these commissions to Trajan's Parthian War. For his service in these units, Voconius was awarded dona militaria. Next he achieved the office of quaestor, which he served in the public province of Macedonia; upon completion of this traditional Republican magistracy he was enrolled in the Senate. Two more of the traditional Republican magistracies followed: plebeian tribune and praetor.

After stepping down from his praetorship, Voconius was appointed to a number of responsible offices. The first listed in his cursus honorum was curator or overseer of the Viae Valeria and Tiburtina; Géza Alföldy estimates he held this post from around the year 135 to around the year 138. Rémy suggests that while he was overseer of these two roads he was also tasked with recruiting soldiers to aid Roman efforts in the Bar Kokhba Revolt. Next he was legatus legionis or commander of Legio IV Scythica stationed at Cyrrhus in Syria; Alföldy dates his tenure from around the year 138 to around 141. After returning to Rome, the sortition awarded Voconius the governorship of the public province of Bithynia et Pontus, which Alföldy and Remy separately date to the term 142/143. His final posting as an ex-praetor was governor of the imperial province of Lycia et Pamphylia; Alföldy dates his tenure from around the year 143 to 147, while Remy dates it from the year 144 to 147. The date of his assignment to Lycia and Pamphylia is certain due to his mention in an inscription on the mausoleum of Opramoas, which implies Voconius was consul in absentia.

Although both inscriptions, erected during his governorship of Lycia and Pamphylia, end about the time of his consulship, from another inscription in Gightis, attests the sortition awarded him proconsular governorship of Africa for the term 161/162. Voconius can be assumed to have died not long after he left this office.

== Family ==
Although the name of his wife is not known, Voconius must have had one. A son for him, Q. Voconius Saxa Amyntianus, is mentioned in the Phaselis inscription. However, nothing more is known of Amyntianus.

Political offices
| Preceded by Gnaeus Terentius Homullus Iunior, and Lucius Aurelius Gallus as suffect consuls | Suffect consul of the Roman Empire; 146 with Gaius Annianus Verus | Succeeded by Lucius Aemilius Longus, and Lucius Stertinius Quintillianus Acilius Strabo Quintus Cornelius Rusticus Apronius Senecio Proculus as suffect consuls |
