= Quintus Cornelius Proculus =

2nd century Roman senator and suffect consul

Quintus Cornelius Proculus was a Roman senator, who was active during the middle of the second century AD. He was suffect consul in the nundinium of November–December 146 as the colleague of Lucius Aemilius Longus. Proculus is known entirely from inscriptions.

== Name and family ==
Proculus' full name, Lucius Stertinius Quintillianus Acilius Strabo Quintus Cornelius Rusticus Apronius Senecio Proculus, is attested in an inscription set up by his daughters Cornelia Procula and Cornelia Placida. In his monograph of naming practices in the first centuries of the Roman Empire, Olli Salomies asserts that the first five elements of his name show that he was adopted by a Lucius Stertinius Quintillianus Acilius Strabo, but notes that "some scholars think that the adoptive father was" Lucius Stertinius Quintillianus Acilius Strabo Gaius Curiatius Maternus Clodius Nummmus, who may be the same person as Gaius Clodius Nummus, suffect consul in 114. Because his daughters only use the gentilicium "Cornelius" in their names, Salomies concludes this adoption took place after their birth.

A second inscription the sisters Procula and Placida erected attests to a brother, Quintus Cornelius Senecio Proculus.

There are two further possible relatives of Proculus. One is Quintus Cornelius Senecio Annianus, suffect consul in 142; a military diploma published by Werner Eck and Peter Weiß provides enough information to allow them to surmise Annianus is Proculus' brother. The other, based on shared name elements, is Lucius Claudius Proculus Cornelianus, suffect consul in 139.

== Life ==
Géza Alföldy believes Proculus was a native of Hispania Baetica. The only detail of his cursus honorum known to us, besides his consulate, is his proconsular governorship of Asia, which has been dated to the term 161/162. His daughters' monument describes Proculus' son Senecio Proculus as praetoricus legatus provinciae Asiae, or legatus to his father during his governorship of Asia.

A Greek inscription from Laodicea on the Lycus that mentions a "Cornelius Proculus" may refer to him. He may also be the Cornelius Proculus mentioned in Justinian's Digest (26,5,24; 48,18,1,4).

Political offices
Preceded by Quintus Voconius Saxa Fidus, and Gaius Annianus Verus as suffect consuls	Suffect consul of the Roman Empire; 146 with Lucius Aemilius Longus	Succeeded by Gaius Prastina Messalinus, and Lucius Annius Largus as ordinary consuls
