= The Prosopography of the Later Roman Empire =

Romanistix work of John Morris and Arnold Hugh Martin Jones

- Author: Arnold Hugh Martin Jones, John Robert Martindale
- Publisher: Cambridge University Press
- Publication date: 1971
- ISBN: 9781107119208

The Prosopography of the Later Roman Empire (abbreviated PLRE) is a work of Roman prosopography published in a set of three volumes collectively describing many of the people attested to have lived in the Roman Empire from AD 260, the date of the beginning of Gallienus' sole rule, to 641, the date of the death of Heraclius. Sources cited include histories, literary texts, inscriptions, and miscellaneous written sources. Individuals who are known only from dubious sources (e.g., the Historia Augusta), as well as identifiable people whose names have been lost, are included with signs indicating the reliability. The consequent use of the approximate dates 260-641 as a wider definition for late Antiquity has been attributed to the project, and it has been described as "the one work that must be on the shelves of anyone who proposes to make a comprehensive study of the late antique world".

== Project History ==
The idea for a late antique prosopography to extend the Prosopographia Imperii Romani had been broached as early as 1901 by the German historian Adolf Harnack, and a German attempt at such a prosopography ran from the start of the twentieth century until the first World War, some of the notes from which later fed into the PLRE.

The PLRE project itself was formulated in 1950, with an agreement between British and French project times whereby the British would undertake the secular part of the prosopography and the French Prosopographie chretienne du Bas-Empire would cover clerical figures. The work then set out with the goal of doing

"...for the later Empire what the Prosopographia Imperii Romani has done for the Principate, to provide the materials for the study of the governing class of the Empire. The majority of the entries will be persons holding official posts or rank together with their families, and the work will not include clerics except in so far as they come into the above categories."

The volumes were published by Cambridge University Press, and involved many authors and contributors. Arnold Hugh Martin Jones, John Robert Martindale, and John Morris were the principal editors.

- Volume 1, published on March 2, 1971, comes to 1,176 pages and covers the years from 260 to 395.
- Volume 2, published on October 9, 1980, comes to 1,355 pages and covers the years from 395 to 527.
- Volume 3, published on October 15, 1992, is itself a two-volume boxed set, coming to a total of 1,626 pages and covering the years from 527 to 641.

== Acessibility and Related Projects ==
PLRE I is digitised and searchable as part of the Connecting Late Antiques project (2022–2025) at the universities of Exeter and Bonn.

The print volume is also available on Archive.org https://archive.org/details/prosopography-later-roman-empire/PLRE-I/

The Prosopography of the Byzantine World project aims to extend the coverage to the year 1265.

== See also ==
- Autobiographic Elements in Latin Inscriptions
