= Inscriptiones Latinae Selectae =

Inscriptiones Latinae Selectae, standard abbreviation ILS, is a three-volume selection of Latin inscriptions edited by Hermann Dessau. The work was published in five parts serially from 1892 to 1916, with numerous reprints. Supporting material and notes are all written in Latin. Inscriptions are organized within chapters (capita, singular caput) by topic, such as funerary inscriptions, or inscriptions pertaining to collegia. Each inscription has an identifying number. Scholars citing a Latin inscription will often provide the ILS number in addition to a reference for the more comprehensive Corpus Inscriptionum Latinarum (CIL); for example, CIL 1^{2}.2.774—ILS 39. A concordance with CIL was published in 1950 (Rome) and 1955 (Berlin).

ILS can also be found cited as Dessau or D.

== See also ==
- Autobiographic Elements in Latin Inscriptions
