= Aulus Claudius Charax =

Aulus Claudius Charax was a Roman senator and historian of the second century AD, who held a number of offices in the emperor's service. He served as suffect consul for the nundinium April–June 147 with Quintus Fuficius Cornutus as his colleague. Charax wrote a history, Hellenika, in forty books, of which only fragments survive.

== Life ==
The cursus honorum for Charax is partly known from a Greek inscription erected in Pergamum. Inscriptions from elsewhere in Asia Minor and Greece provide other details of his life.

Bernard Remy, in his monograph on the Fasti of Roman officials of the provinces of Asia Minor, suggests that while traveling through the eastern provinces, the emperor Hadrian met Charax. There is ample evidence that Charax was very wealthy; his possessions included a large tile factory. Being respectably wealthy, and a cultured man, he obviously appealed to the hellenophile emperor who decided to facilitate the latter's election as quaestor; this office enrolled him in the Senate. The inscription from Pergamum attests Charax discharged this office in the public province of Sicily, then adds the puzzling note that he was adlected inter aedilicios – or as an aedile – which makes better sense if Charax had skipped the office of quaestor. Remy suggests that the person who wrote the inscription may have been confused about the details of Charax's adlection. Anthony Birley suggests that this could "indicate some special role for of the senate at the time of Antoninus' accession."

In any case, after this event Charax advanced to the office of praetor, after which he held a series of promotions at what Remy describes as a very fast rate. He was appointed curator of the Via Latina; Géza Alföldy dates this office from about the years 138 to about 141. This was followed immediately by legatus legionis or commander of Legio II Augusta, which was stationed in Roman Britain; Alföldy dates his commission from about 141 to around 144. During these years the legion was involved with the campaigns of governor Quintus Lollius Urbicus in Scotland, and with the building of the Antonine Wall. This was followed by governorship of Cilicia, which Alföldy dates from immediately after Charax left his commission to around the time of his consulship; it is possible Charax was consul in absentia.

Here the information on the Pergamum inscription ends, indicating it was inscribed shortly after Charax's consulate. Details from the other inscriptions now come into play. He constructed at his own expense the vestibule (propylon) for the Asklépiéion in Pergamum. Another inscription from Sparta attests he was an eponymous patronomos around the middle of the second century; this was a position that was sometimes held by distinguished foreigners.

Political offices
Preceded by Gaius Prastina Messalinus, and Lucius Annius Largus as consules ordinarii	Suffect consul of the Roman Empire; 147 with Quintus Fuficius Cornutus	Succeeded by Cupressenus Gallus, and Quintus Cornelius Quadratus as consules suffecti
