= Quintus Cornelius Quadratus =

2nd century Roman senator and suffect consul

Quintus Cornelius Quadratus was a Roman senator who held a number of offices in the emperor's service. He served as suffect consul for the nundinium July-September 147 as the colleague of Cupressenus Gallus. Quadratus is best known as the brother of the orator Marcus Cornelius Fronto. He is mentioned four times in the surviving correspondence of the orator.

Although Quadratus is one of several natives of Cirta in North Africa who achieved a successful Senatorial career during the reign of Marcus Aurelius, archeological evidence attests he made his home in Rome. Water pipes recovered from the Esquiline Hill bearing the names of Fronto and Quadratus (Cornelio(rum) Front(onis) et Quadra(ti)) have been interpreted as not only demonstrating that Quadratus was the younger brother, but that both had a residence in that part of Rome.

Only one office is known of Quadratus' senatorial career. He was legatus legionis or commander of Legio III Augusta in North Africa, which made him effective governor of Numidia. Géza Alföldy dates the tenure of his commission from around the year 141 to about the year 143.

Political offices
Preceded by Aulus Claudius Charax, and Quintus Fuficius Cornutus as consules suffecti	Suffect consul of the Roman Empire; 147 with Cupressenus Gallus	Succeeded by Sextus Cocceius Severianus, and Tiberius Licinius Cassius Cassianus as consules suffecti
