= Orbicia gens =

The gens Orbicia was an obscure plebeian family of ancient Rome. None of its members are known to have held any magistracies, but several are known from inscriptions. The name may be best remembered from Orbicius, perhaps a Byzantine military strategist of uncertain date, credited with the authorship of a short treatise on the Byzantine army.

== Origin ==
The nomen Orbicius belongs to a class of gentilicia formed from other names, in this instance the Latin nomen Orbius, using the suffix -icius. Orbius is derived from the cognomen Orbus, a waif or orphan.

== Members ==
This list includes abbreviated praenomina. For an explanation of this practice, see filiation.

- Orbicia Procula, a freedwoman, was the concubine of the haruspex Gaius Helvius Agens. She died at the age of thirty, and was buried at Falerio in Picenum.
- Quintus Orbicius Velageni f., named in an inscription from Augusta Taurinorum in Gallia Transpadana.
- Manius Orbicius M'. l. Salvius, a freedman named in an inscription from Rome.
- Orbicius, the author of a short treatise on the names of the subdivisions and commanders of the army, incorporated into the Etymologicum Magnum, a twelfth century encyclopedia. Nothing is known of the date of Orbicius, except that he must have lived before the compilation of the Etymologicum.

== See also ==
- List of Roman gentes

== Bibliography ==
- Etymologicum Magnum.
- Dictionary of Greek and Roman Biography and Mythology, William Smith, ed., Little, Brown and Company, Boston (1849).
- Theodor Mommsen et alii, Corpus Inscriptionum Latinarum (The Body of Latin Inscriptions, abbreviated CIL), Berlin-Brandenburgische Akademie der Wissenschaften (1853–present).
- René Cagnat et alii, L'Année épigraphique (The Year in Epigraphy, abbreviated AE), Presses Universitaires de France (1888–present).
- George Davis Chase, "The Origin of Roman Praenomina", in Harvard Studies in Classical Philology, vol. VIII (1897).
- D.P. Simpson, Cassell's Latin and English Dictionary, Macmillan Publishing Company, New York (1963).
