= Mindia gens =

Plebeian family at ancient Rome

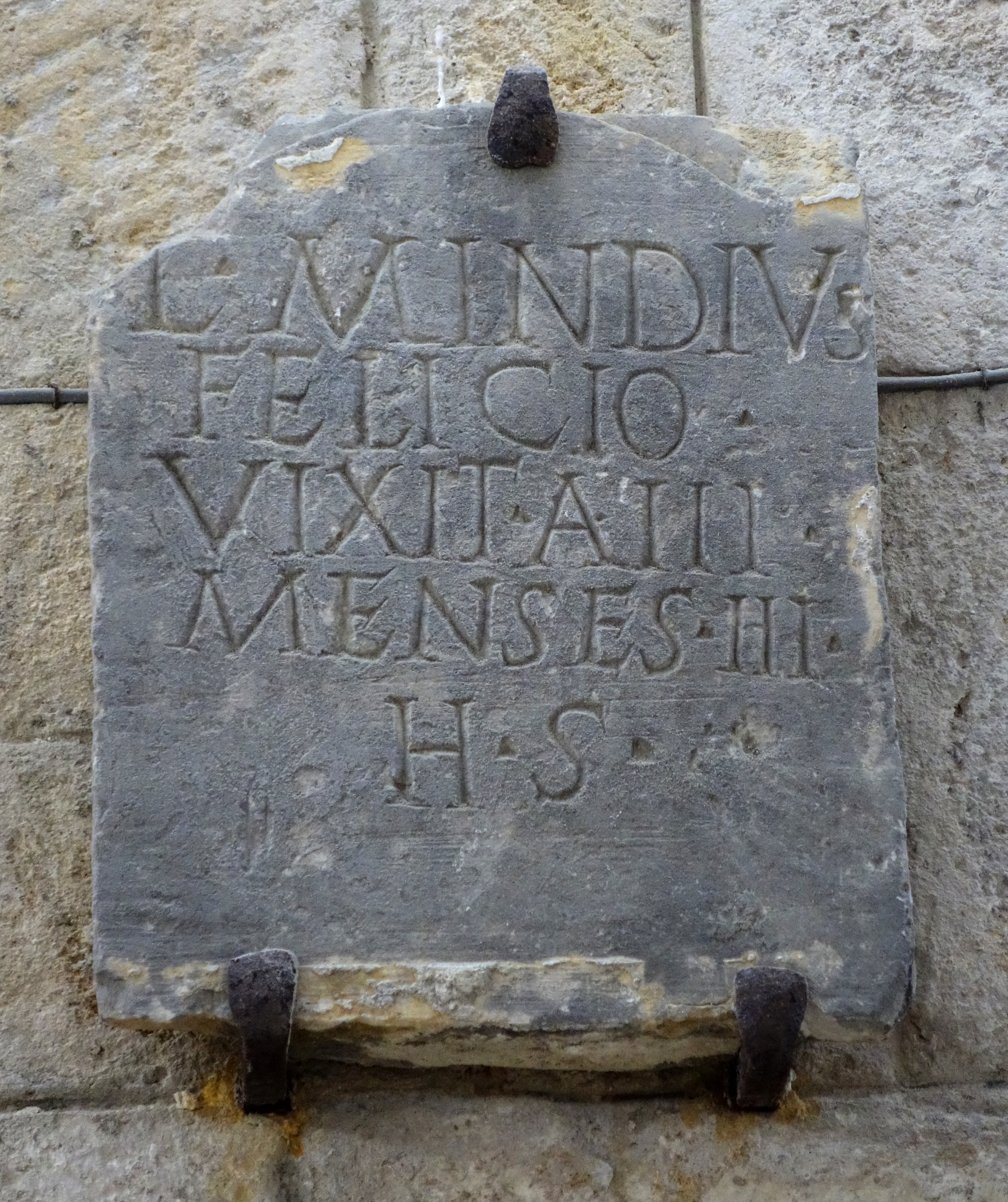
Funerary stele of Lucius Mindius Felicio, age 3, from Brindisi, first century

The gens Mindia was a minor plebeian family at ancient Rome. Members of this gens appear in history beginning in the middle of the first century BC, and achieved senatorial rank in imperial times. Mindia Matidia was a grandniece of the emperor Trajan.

== Members ==
This list includes abbreviated praenomina. For an explanation of this practice, see filiation.

- Marcus Mindius Marcellus, a friend of Caesar, became an officer under Octavian during the Sicilian War.
- Lucius Mindius Balbus, a Roman senator, was governor of Bithynia and Pontus at some point between AD 43 and 47.
- Lucius Mindius Pollio, another senator, was governor of Bithynia and Pontus some time after AD 42.
- Mindia Potentilla, high priestess of Artemis in Ephesus during the reign of Trajan.
- Mindia Menandra, a priestess of Artemis in Ephesus during the reign of Trajan.
- Lucius Mindius, the husband of Salonia Matidia, and father of Mindia Matidia.
- Mindia L. f. Matidia, a grandniece of Trajan, and sister-in-law of Hadrian.
- Mindia Sabina, the foster-daughter of Fortunata, buried at Ostia in Latium, aged seven years, eight months, and one day.

== See also ==
- List of Roman gentes
- Minidia gens

== Bibliography ==
- René Cagnat et alii, L'Année épigraphique (The Year in Epigraphy, abbreviated AE), Presses Universitaires de France (1888–present).
- Sjef van Tilborg (2014). Reading John in Ephesus. Leiden: Brill. ISBN 9789004267299.
- Ronald Syme, Approaching The Roman Revolution: Papers on Republican History, Federico Santangelo, ed., Oxford University Press (2016).
- Epigrafia ostiense dopo il CIL: 2000 iscrizioni funerarie (Ostian Epigraphy after the CIL: 2000 Funerary Inscriptions), Maria Letizia Caldelli, Mireille Cébeillac-Gervasoni, Nicolas Laubry, Ilaria Manzini, Raffaella Marchesini, Filippo Marini Recchia, and Fausto Zevi, eds., Antichistica (2018) ISBN 9788869692307
