= Magistrates of the Roman Republic =

Magistrates of the Roman Republic (abbreviated as MRR) is a three-volume work (published in 1951, 1952, and 1986) by Thomas Robert Shannon Broughton listing known annual magistrates of the Roman Republic along with relevant primary sources for each entry and an index of careers. Also included are undated senators and priests. A fundamental and indispensable reference work in republican prosopography, it is widely cited in the scholarly study of republican Rome.

== Contents ==
MRR is the main and fundamental prosopographical reference for republican Rome, containing extensive lists by year of the known magistrates for that year, with periodic lists of priests. The lists of magistrates are divided by rank, with most years showing first the consuls which gave the year its name, followed by a dictator and his magister equitum if one was appointed, the censors if they held office in that year, praetors, aediles, plebeian tribunes, and quaestors. After the urban magistrates are the promagistrates, military tribunes, legates (both envoys and lieutenants), prefects, and members of special commissions. After the magistrates more broadly are listed, in some years, a snapshot of known priests and members of the various priestly colleges (the pontifices, augurs, quindecimviri, and vestals).

Entries are often accompanied with a short description of the activities which the officeholder undertook while holding that office; for example, the entry on the quaestor Publius Clodius Pulcher in 61 BC indicates that he was sent to Sicily after acquittal in a trial for sacrilege while citing the relevant primary sources, such as fragments of Cicero's speeches and Asconius' commentary, for that claim.

The first volume, published in 1951, covers magistrates from the founding of the republic, dated in the Varronian chronology to 509 BC, through to 100 BC. The second volume, published in 1952, covers magistrates from 99 BC to 31 BC inclusive; the second volume also includes an index tracking specific officeholders and what offices they held. For example, the entry for Marcus Junius Brutus tracks his holding of the post of triumvir monetalis c. 60 BC through his quaestorship, governorship of Cisalpine Gaul, urban praetorship in 44, and proconsulship in Macedonia in 43–42 BC. Also provided in the appendices are lists of the monetales, a general list of magistrates without certain dates, and a list of known senators. There was a supplemental volume in 1960 with corrections to the first two volumes; however, this was superseded by the third volume published in 1986, which lists corrections to the previous volumes by name.

While Broughton was aware of the issues raised by ancient sources and modern scholars of the magisterial lists prior to the Pyrrhic War (281–275 BC), they were presented as given to make them available in a scholarly compendium.

== History and publication ==
In the early 1930s, Brought conceived of a project to collate information about the prosopography of republican Rome. This work was inspired in part by the Prosopographia Imperii Romani, a work listing for imperial Rome all notable persons with details of their careers. Although this work was delayed by his work supporting the publication of Tenney Frank's Economic Survey of Ancient Rome with chapters on Asia Minor, Broughton restarted work on MRR by 1939 with a pilot project to compile a year-by-year list of magistrates, officers, and priests from the Second Punic War onwards under the direction of one of Broughton's PhD students, Marcia L Patterson. Work continued through 1944, when Broughton applied for and received a Guggenheim Grant for the project. By summer 1945 most of the first volume had been written and work on the second volume through to the death of Julius Caesar, in 44 BC, continued apace. The first volume was submitted for publication in autumn 1950; while in Italy in the summer of 1952, Broughton submitted the second volume for publication. The volumes appeared in 1951 and 1952, respectively.

Prior to MRR's publication, the collations of material on republican magistracies was largely scattered. In terms of preexisting lists, there was an Onomasticon by Johann Caspar von Orelli for persons mentioned in Cicero and sketches of families in Wilhelm Drumann's Geschichte Roms, both published in the early 19th century. In terms of material, the slowly-published but encyclopaedic listing of persons in theRealencyclopadie der Altertumswissenchaft (RE), especially from the hand of Friedrich Münzer, was vital material for MRR's collections. Indeed in many instances Broughton relied on Münzer's work in RE and his 1920 book Römische Adelsparteien und Adelsfamilien, though Broughton also seems to have preferred at times to defer to the raw reports of the ancient sources rather than modern scholar's reconstructions.

Shortly after publication, Broughton was awarded the Charles J Goodwin Award of Merit the next year in 1953 for his work on the project. The immediate reviews of MRR by other classicists were uniformly positive, stressing how the compendium was a monumental and indispensable work which would transform the study of the republican period.

A supplement to the main MRR volumes was published in 1960, reflecting corrections from scholarship emerging from re-evaluation of the evidence, new numismatic evidence, and criticism from other scholars. A further supplement was planned in the 1980s and expanded into a third volume to supersede the 1960 supplement. This third volume also included the errata published in the original MRR volumes. Some of the main sources relied upon for the supplement included Lily Ross Taylor's Voting Districts of the Roman Republic, G V Sumner's prosopographical tables in Orators in Cicero's Brutus, and D R Shackleton Bailey's work on persons appearing in Cicero's letters.

== Legacy ==
In reviews for the third volume in 1986, the classicist John Briscoe noted that "the original publication of MRR... transformed the possibilities for research on republican politics". Of the utility of Broughton's volumes on the study of republican Rome, the classicist Ronald Ridley wrote in a 1996 edited volume in Broughton's memory that "in the more than forty years that have elapsed since the appearance of the first volume... the work is more indispensable than ever". Similarly, the classicist Erich Gruen wrote in the same volume:

Broughton's Magistrates of the Roman Republic is a work unparalleled in our field. No one who grew up with MRR at his or her fingertips could imagine how Roman Republican history, particularly political and institutional history, was ever written without it. If anything on these subjects can qualify as indispensable, MRR would surely be the top candidate.

In 2026, MRR was described by the classicist Gianpaolo Urso was "remain[ing] to this day an indispensable work-tool", though some portions of the work on plebeian tribunes and quaestors were noted as having been superseded by later prosopographical monographs. Some criticism has also been raised as to how MRR's presentation foregrounds the version of republican history transmitted by the Augustan-age Fasti Consulares and Livy's History of Rome. That Augustan version has been criticised as overly schematic and anachronistic since it projects the fully coalesced structure of the late republic onto earlier periods of republican history that are of dubious historicity.

== Bibliography ==
=== Magistrates of the Roman Republic ===
- Broughton, Thomas Robert Shannon (1951). The magistrates of the Roman republic. Vol. 1. New York: American Philological Association.
- Broughton, Thomas Robert Shannon (1952). The magistrates of the Roman republic. Vol. 2. New York: American Philological Association.
- Broughton, Thomas Robert Shannon (1986). The magistrates of the Roman republic. Vol. 3. Atlanta, GA: Scholars Press.

=== Other sources ===
- Horster, Marietta; et al., eds. (2026). Brill's Companion to Roman Prosopography. Brill. pp. 272–284. doi:10.1163/9789004748613_017. ISBN 978-90-04-74861-3.
  - Pina Polo, Francisco. "'Prosopography from below' in the Roman republic". In Horster et al. (2026), pp. 272–284.
  - Urso, Gianpaolo. "Reconstructiong Roman power structures through narratives: prosopography and the early Roman republic". In Horster et al. (2026), pp. 242–254.
- Linderski, Jerzy, ed. (1996). Imperium sine fine: T Robert S Broughton and the Roman republic. Stuttgart: Franz Steiner Verlag. ISBN 978-3-515-06948-9 – via Internet Archive.
  - Gruen, Erich S. "The Roman oligarchy: image and perception". In Linderski (1996), pp. 215–234.
  - Houston, George W (1996a). "Fasti Broughtoniani: the professional activities and published works of Thomas Robert Shannon Broughton". In Linderski (1996), pp. 1–30.
  - Houston, George W (1996b). "Broughton remembered". In Linderski (1996), pp. 35–42.
  - Ridley, Ronald T. "T R S Broughton and Friedrich Münzer". In Linderski (1996), pp. 43–56.
