= Quintus Cornelius Senecio Annianus =

2nd century Roman senator, consul and governor

Quintus Cornelius Senecio Annianus was a Roman senator, who was active during the reign of Antoninus Pius and held several imperial appointments. He was suffect consul in the nundinium of September-October 142 as the colleague of Lucius Tusidius Campester. He is known only from inscriptions.

Annianus had long been suspected to be a relative of Quintus Cornelius Proculus, suffect consul in 146. With the publication of a fragmentary military diploma that fixed Annianus' consular tenure, he is now thought to be Proculus' brother.

== Life ==
Annianus' existence is attested by a single inscription from Carteia in Hispania Baetica, which records his cursus honorum up to his consulate. The first office he is recorded to have held was quaestor. Bernard Rémy notes that our ignorance prevents us from understanding the significance of Annianus executing the duties of this office in Rome: if Annianus was the son of a Senator, he would have been commissioned a military tribune prior to this magistracy; if he was a homo novus, or the first of his family raised into the Senate, to have his career begin as an urban quaestor would have been an honor meant to appease him. Upon completion of this traditional Republican magistracy Annianus would be enrolled in the Senate. Two more of the traditional Republican magistracies followed: plebeian tribune and praetor.

After stepping down from the office of praetor, Annianus was appointed to four more positions; with Werner Eck's dating of his consulate fixed in the year 142, these appointments can be confidently dated to the reign of Hadrian. First was as curator of the Via Latina. Next he was commissioned as legatus legionis or commander of the Legio VII Gemina, which at the time was stationed at the modern Leon in Hispania Tarraconensis. Upon returning to Rome, Annianus was appointed curator of another road, the Via Appia. Before he acceded to the consulate, the sortition allocated to him the public province of Bithynia and Pontus; there are many gaps in our knowledge of the governors of this province, so the only safe statement that can be made about the date of his tenure is that Annianus governed Bithynia and Pontus before it became an imperial province in 134.

The inscription from Carteia attests that Annianus was a member of the priesthood of Hercules at some unknown date; he possibly held this office while still at Carteia.

Political offices
| Preceded by Marcus Cornelius Fronto, and Gaius Laberius Priscus as suffect consuls | Suffect consul of the Roman Empire; 142 with Lucius Tusidius Campester | Succeeded by (Sulpicius?) Julianus, and Titus Julius Castus as suffect consuls |
