= Sjef van Tilborg =

Dutch priest (1939–2003)

- Born: Josephus Henricus Adrianus van Tilborg; 10 April 1939; Tilburg
- Died: 22 May 2003; Nijmegen
- Education: Radboud University Nijmegen
- Occupations: Theologian, university teacher
- Employer: Radboud University Nijmegen (1993–)
- Political party: Communist Party of the Netherlands

Josephus Henricus Adrianus (Sjef) van Tilborg (10 April 1939 – 22 May 2003) was a Dutch Roman Catholic priest and Missionary of the Sacred Heart (MSC), theologian, and professor of New Testament studies. In his interpretation of biblical texts, Van Tilborg employed materialist exegesis, a combination of Marxism, critique of ideology, and liberation theology. In his daily life—first as a pastor among Italian immigrants in Arnhem, and later as a member of the Chesed community in Nijmegen, where he lived alongside marginalized youth and asylum seekers who had exhausted all legal remedies—he sought to put his views on the Gospel into practice.

== Life ==
Sjef van Tilborg was born on April 10, 1939, in Tilburg as the second child and only son in a family of five children. His father was a weaver in one of the many factory buildings in the textile city of Tilburg; his mother was a housewife. As the son of a working-class family, Van Tilborg—although it was clear he was a good student—was not allowed to attend a school for the affluent middle class. He had to attend the Brothers of St. John, a school for working-class children, who enrolled him in a high school program at the minor seminary in the mission house of the Missionaries of the Sacred Heart (MSC) on Bredaseweg in Tilburg.

After completing his initial formation at the Philosophicum in Brummen and the Theologicum in Stein, he was ordained a priest on September 1, 1963. The congregation sent him to Rome for further studies, where he earned a licentiate in theology from the Gregorian University in 1965 and a licentiate in biblical studies from the Biblicum in 1967. Even while in Rome, he combined his studies with pastoral work in various locations. Back in the Netherlands, he completed his Master's examination in 1968 at the Faculty of Theology of the Catholic University of Nijmegen, to which he would remain loyal until his death. On September 1 of that year, Van Tilborg was hired by the Faculty of Theology as a part-time associate professor. His field of expertise was New Testament exegesis. In addition, beginning in 1970, he served as a full-time position as supervisor in the Department of Pastoral Theology. In June 1970, Van Tilborg completed his dissertation Jewish Leaders in Matthew. He also worked as a pastor for the Italian community in Arnhem.

Through his pastoral work, Van Tilborg became involved in politics, a path he chose decisively and clearly by becoming an active member of the Communist Party of the Netherlands. On May 18, 1972, he earned his doctorate under the supervision of Willem Grossouw and Bas van Iersel with his dissertation The Jewish Leaders in Matthew. In 1993, he was appointed to the chair of New Testament Exegesis at the Catholic University of Nijmegen (now Radboud University). Van Tilborg died unexpectedly on May 22, 2003, one year before he was due to retire. He had prepared the program for his farewell ceremony and address under the title: In Search of Other Worlds. There were to be presentations on music, distant planetary systems, and Jewish mysticism, and he himself was to conclude with a lecture on "the peril of death in the apocalypse". He had also already envisioned who would succeed him.

Sjef van Tilborg died on the 22th of May 2003, in Nijmegen, Netherlands.

== Festschrift ==
The Festschrift that was to be presented to him on that occasion has been published as a posthumous tribute under the title One Text, a Thousand Methods: Studies in Memory of Sjef van Tilborg.

== Research ==
For Van Tilborg, biblical exegesis was closely connected with practice. He regarded the study of Jesus Christ as having implications beyond academic inquiry. Alongside his academic work, he participated in ministry among Italian migrant workers in Arnhem during the 1970s. Some of his students later became involved in comparable forms of social or pastoral engagement. Van Tilborg is reported to have regarded this as creating a certain tension: he sought to encourage rigorous academic study of Scripture while not discouraging students from pursuing pastoral ministry. His teaching generally reflected the view that biblical study and personal commitment were closely related.

After his academic responsibilities as a professor became his primary occupation, Van Tilborg continued to participate in community-based initiatives. Together with Fons Meijers, a fellow member of the MSC, and Reverend Jacqueline van Marion, he formed the core of the Chesed community. This residential community sought to put into practice the biblical concept of chesed (steadfast love, faithfulness, or mercy). Beginning in the late 1990s, members of the community opened their home on Burghardt van de Berghstraat in Nijmegen to young people experiencing severe social difficulties and to asylum seekers who had exhausted their legal avenues for residence.

Throughout his career, Van Tilborg combined academic research with pastoral and social engagement. When discussing materialist exegesis in the 1970s, he observed that "Materialist exegesis […] claims exclusivity because it considers its own way of reading to be the only correct one".

Until well into the 1970s, New Testament scholarship was largely shaped by historical-critical approaches. Within Roman Catholic biblical scholarship, the use of historical-critical methods had been subject to significant restrictions before the encyclical Divino afflante Spiritu (1943), after which these methods became more widely accepted. Against this background, the Catholic University of Nijmegen increasingly developed approaches that drew on philosophy and literary theory in addition to historical criticism. These included semiotics, structuralism, liberation theology (including feminist and gay theological perspectives), narratology, intertextuality, and later poststructuralist and postmodern approaches.

Although the theoretical frameworks informing Van Tilborg's work evolved over time—from Marxist-inspired approaches associated with Louis Althusser to later influences such as Jacques Derrida—his scholarship consistently reflected an interest in the relationship between biblical interpretation and contemporary social concerns. This orientation is evident in works such as Believing Between Utopia and Reality (1980) and The Sermon on the Mount as an Ideological Intervention (1986), which examine biblical texts in relation to questions of ideology and social justice. It is also reflected in Imaginative Love in John (1993), which engages liberation-theological perspectives, including discussions of gender and homosexuality. Reading John in Ephesus (1996), while placing greater emphasis on historical reconstruction and the reception of the Gospel of John in first-century Ephesus, also considers themes relating to slavery, marginalization, and social inequality. His final book, Jesus' Appearances and Disappearances in Luke 24 (2000), co-authored with Patrick Chatelion Counet, combines a cognitive-imaginative reading model with an exploration of burial practices and their social significance.

Across these publications, Van Tilborg showed a sustained interest in the social dimensions of biblical interpretation and in the everyday circumstances of human life, including questions of survival, food, relationships, and death. His attention to burial practices reflected an interest in the cultural and theological meanings attached to death and remembrance, including the idea that "disappearing is a form of appearing."

== Works ==
Thesis

- Van Tilborg, Sjef (1972). The Jewish Leaders in Matthew (PhD thesis).

Books

- ——————— (1972). The Jewish Leaders in Matthew. Leiden: Brill.
- ——————— (1974). De brieven van Johannes, vertaald en toegelicht. Bussum: Romen.
- ——————— (1976). Misschien dat God het ons vergeeft. Uit de praktijk van een pastor voor vreemdelingen. Baarn: Ten Have.
- ——————— (1980). Geloven tussen utopie en werkelijkheid. Hilversum: Gooi & Sticht.
- ——————— (1986). The Sermon on the Mount as an Ideological Intervention. A Reconstruction of Meaning. Assen: Van Gorcum.
- ——————— (1988). Johannes. Belichting van het Bijbelboek. Boxtel: Katholieke Bijbelstichting.
- ——————— (1993). Imaginative Love in John. Biblical Interpretation Series. Vol. 2. Leiden: Brill. doi:10.1163/9789004271241. ISBN 978-90-04-09716-2.
- ——————— (1994). Al lezend stemmen horen. Nijmegen: Universitair Publikatiebureau.
- ——————— (1996). Reading John in Ephesus. Novum Testamentum, Supplements. Vol. 83. Leiden: Brill. doi:10.1163/9789004267299. ISBN 978-90-04-10530-0.
- ——————— (1998). De geliefde leerling: een toegang tot God?. Nijmegen: Villa Lila.
- ———————; Counet, Patrick Chatelion (2000). Jesus' Appearances and Disappearances in Luke 24. Leiden: Brill.

Articles

- ——————— (1978). "De materialistische exegese als keuze". Tijdschrift voor Theologie. 18: 109.
- ——————— (2001). "Wie is de homo die gered wordt? De interpretatie van Genesis in documenten over homoseksualiteit vanuit de katholieke kerk". Tijdschrift voor Theologie. 41: 3–12.
- ——————— (2004). "The Danger at Midday: Death Threats in the Apocalypse". Biblica. 85 (1): 1–23. doi:10.2143/BIB.85.1.3194400. JSTOR 42614488.

== Book Reviews ==
- Casciaro, José María (1989). "Sjef van TILBORG, The Sermon on the Mount as an Ideologial Intervention. A Reconstruction of meaning, Van Gorcum, Assen 1986, 374 pp., 16 x 24". Scripta Theologica. 21 (1): 352. doi:10.15581/006.21.18833. ISSN 0036-9764.
- Gundry, Robert H. (1973). "The Jewish Leaders in Matthew by Sjef van Tilborg". Journal of Biblical Literature. 92 (1): 138–40. doi:10.2307/3262773. JSTOR 3262773.
- Horsley, G. H. R. (1998). "Reading John in Ephesus. (Supplements to Novum Testamentum, 83.) by Sjef van Tilborg". The Journal of Theological Studies. 49 (1): 265–73. JSTOR 23968255.
- Kraabel, Alf T. (1999). "Reading John in Ephesus (NovTSup 83) by SJEF VAN TILBORG". The Catholic Biblical Quarterly. 61 (2): 386–88. JSTOR 43723604.
- Kiley, Mark (1995). "Imaginative Love in John (Book Review)". Catholic Biblical Quarterly. 57: 196–97. ISSN 0008-7912.
- Piper, Ronald A. (1999). "Reading John in Ephesus (Book) 1". Biblical Interpretation. 7 (4): 463–64. ISSN 0927-2569.
- Rensberger, David (1998). "Reading John in Ephesus by Sjef van Tilborg". Journal of Biblical Literature. 117 (3): 541–42. doi:10.2307/3266463. JSTOR 3266463.
- Smith, D. Moody (1995). "Imaginative Love in John. (Biblical Interpretation Series, 2.) by Sjef van Tilborg". The Journal of Theological Studies. 46 (2): 636–39. JSTOR 23966036.
- Van Den Heever, Gerhard (1999). "Reading John in Ephesus (Book Review)". Religion & Theology. 6 (1): 100. ISSN 1023-0807.
