= Autobiographic Elements in Latin Inscriptions =

1910 book by Henry Herbert Armstrong

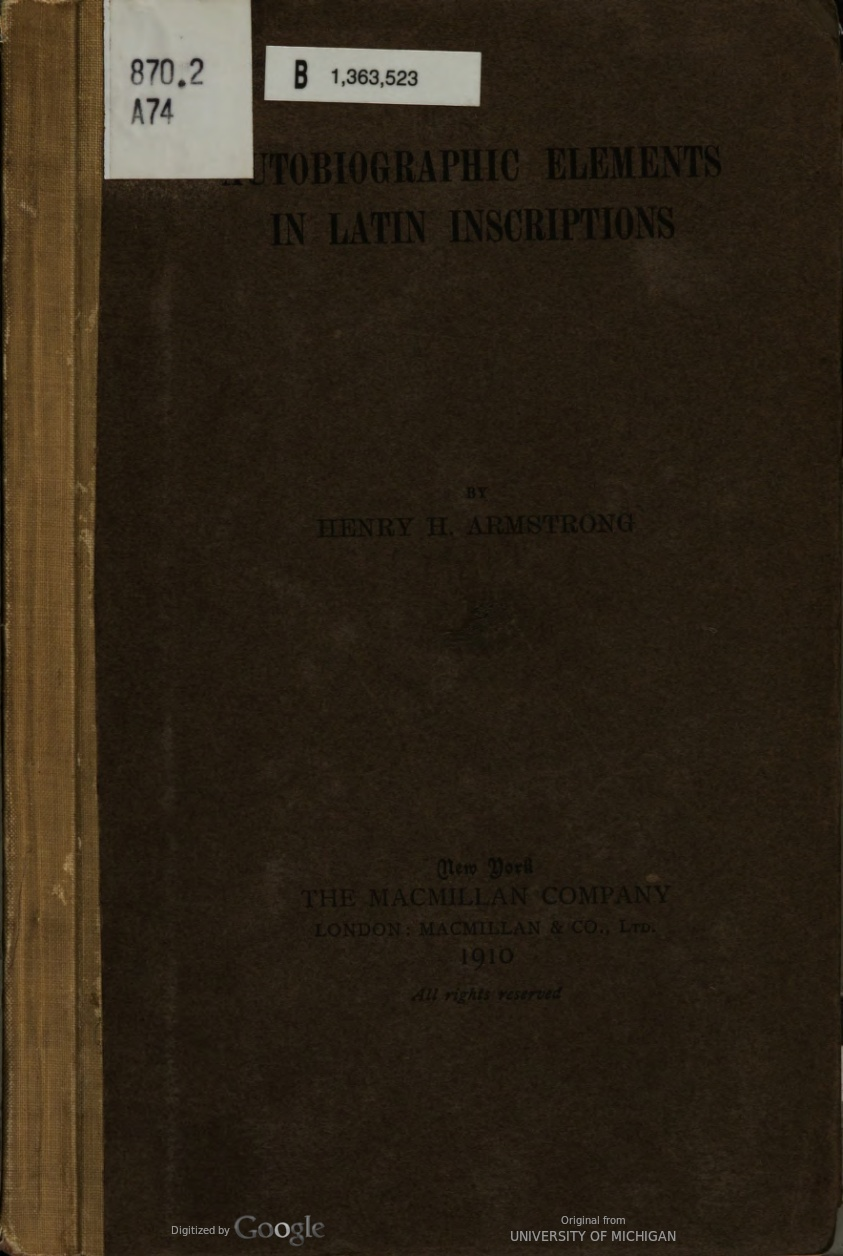
- Author: Henry Herbert Armstrong
- Language: English
- Publisher: The MacMillan Company
- Publication date: 1910
- Publication place: United States

Autobiographic Elements in Latin Inscriptions is a 1910 book by Henry Herbert Armstrong, published by The MacMillan Company.

== Content ==
The book is an academic text analyzing autobiographic elements of Latin inscriptions from ancient Rome. Personal narratives of events are predominant in Roman literature, with autobiographic elements also being found in inscriptions. These include inscriptions where a person gives information on their own life, expresses opinions about events, or places themself in relation to another person. Armstrong was a classicist who taught at multiple universities in the United States and studied at the American School of Classical Studies in Rome.

== Reception ==
S. R. reviewed the book in Revue Archéologique, a French archaeological journal. W. H. D. Rouse reviewed the book in The Classical Review, writing that the book "must have cost an enourmous labour; but something human emerges" and that "Armstrong includes even the fictitious personification where the object is supposed to address the reader, this is to extend the idea of autobiography. His essay is rather a study of formulae; for with so a wide a conception of the subject, there is not room to give many texts." Johannes Tolkiehn reviewed the book for The Classical Quarterly, writing that book was "On the whole a delightful production, though the net is cast rather too widely."

== See also ==
- Corpus Inscriptionum Latinarum
