= Hermann Dessau =

German ancient historian and epigrapher (1856–1931)

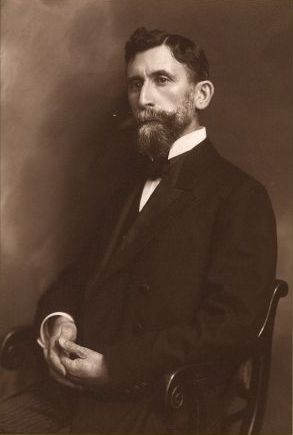
Hermann Dessau.

Hermann Dessau (6 April 1856, Frankfurt am Main – 12 April 1931, Berlin) was a German ancient historian and epigrapher. He is noted for a key work of textual criticism published in 1889 on the Historia Augusta, which uncovered reasons to believe that this surviving text of ancient Roman imperial history had been written under circumstances very different from those previously believed.

He studied at the University of Berlin as a pupil of Theodor Mommsen, receiving his doctorate in 1877 from the University of Strasbourg. On behalf of the Corpus Inscriptionum Latinarum (CIL) he travelled to Italy and North Africa. In 1884 he was habilitated as a historian in Berlin, where he subsequently became an associate honorary professor (1912) and full honorary professor (1917). From 1900 to 1922 he served as a scientific officer for the Prussian Academy of Sciences.

== Literary works ==
- Über Zeit und Persönlichkeït der Scriptores historiae Augustae. In: Hermes 24 (1889), S. 337ff., online about Gallica.
- Inscriptiones Latinae Selectae. 3 vols. in 5 Teilbänden. Weidmann, Berlin, 1892–1916.
- Prosopographia imperii romani saec I. II. III. Edita consilio et avctoritate Academiae scientiarvm regiae borvssicae, 3 volumes, Berolini, apvd Georgivm Reaimervm, 1897-98 (with Elimar Klebs, Paul von Rohden).
- Geschichte der römischen Kaiserzeit. 2 vols. in 3 Teilbänden. Weidmann, Berlin, 1924–1930

== Bibliography ==
- Schmidt, Manfred G. (ed.). Hermann Dessau (1856-1931) zum 150. Geburtstag des Berliner Althistorikers und Epigraphikers (Berlin, Walter de Gryuter, 2009) (Beiträge eines Kolloquiums und wissenschaftliche Korrespondenz des Jubilars. Corpus inscriptionum Latinarum / Auctarium s.n., 3).
