= Elimar Klebs =

German historian (1852–1918)

- Born: 15 October 1852; Braunsberg, Kingdom of Prussia
- Died: 16 May 1918 (aged 65); Marburg, German Empire
- Education: University of Berlin
- Awards: Prussian Academy of Sciences
- Scientific career
- Fields: Ancient history
- Workplaces: University of Berlin; University of Marburg

Elimar Klebs (15 October 1852 – 16 May 1918) was a German historian of ancient history. He was the brother of botanist Georg Klebs.

== Biography ==
Klebs was born in Braunsberg (Braniewo), Prussia. He studied in Berlin under Theodor Mommsen and Heinrich von Treitschke, receiving his doctorate in 1876 and his habilitation in 1883. Subsequently, he served as a privatdozent in Berlin.

Along with Hermann Dessau and Paul von Rohden, he was involved in producing the first edition of the Prussian Academy of Sciences' Prosopographia Imperii Romani. Klebs prepared the first volume, letters A-C, which appeared in 1897.

Beginning in 1906, he was a professor for ancient history at the University of Marburg. Because of a serious illness, he was put on leave in 1913 and discharged from his academic duties the following year. He died in Marburg.

== Published works ==
Klebs focused on Ancient Roman history, such as the Historia Augusta, the Historia Apollonii and also studies involving the courtier Petronius. In addition, he made significant contributions to the Realencyclopädie der Classischen Altertumswissenschaft. The following are some of his principal literary efforts:

- "Prosopographia Imperii Romani" saec. I. II. III. Band 1 A–C, Reimer, Berlin 1897.
- "Die Erzählung von Apollonius aus Tyrus. Eine geschichtliche Untersuchung über ihre lateinische Urform und ihre späteren Bearbeitungen". Berlin 1899.
- "Die Sammlung der Scriptores historiae Augustae", Rheinisches Museum für Philologie Band 45, 1890.
- "Petroniana. Anhang I. Die municipalen Praetoren. Anhang II. Vrbs, oppidvm, civitas, patria".
