= Prosopographia Imperii Romani =

Prosopography of people from the Roman empire

The Prosopographia Imperii Romani, abbreviated PIR, is a collective historical work to establish the prosopography of high-profile people from the Roman Empire. The time period covered extends from the Battle of Actium in 31 BC to the reign of Diocletian. The final volume of the second edition, PIR^{2}, vol. IX, V–Z, appeared in November 2015.

For periods after the third century which the PIR does not cover, there is Prosopography of the Later Roman Empire by A.H.M. Jones, J.R. Martindale, and John Morris. And for the period before the empire, during the Roman Republic, there is Magistrates of the Roman Republic.

== First edition ==
The first edition was rapidly achieved and published in Berlin in the line of the great works of scholarship from the historical school of economics which had been successful in achieving the project of a corpus of all the Latin inscriptions, the Corpus Inscriptionum Latinarum. Led by Elimar Klebs, Hermann Dessau and Paul von Rohden, the first edition of the PIR was published in three volumes from 1897 to 1898.

== Second edition ==
Parts and fascicles of PIR^{2}
| Part | Fascicle | Letters | Year |
|---|---|---|---|
| 1 | | A–B | 1933 |
| 2 | | C | 1936 |
| 3 | | D–F | 1944 |
| 4 | | G–I | 1966 |
| 5 | 1 | L | 1970 |
| 5 | 2 | M | 1983 |
| 5 | 3 | N–O | 1987 |
| 6 | | P | 1998 |
| 7 | 1 | Q–R | 1999 |
| 7 | 2 | S | 2006 |
| 8 | 1 | T | 2009 |
| 8 | 2 | U/V–Z | 2015 |

The implementation of a second edition was last updated in 1933 for publication in Berlin. The first booklet of the second edition was led by Edmund Groag and Arthur Stein who brought together the letters A and B. The publication was interrupted by World War II while working on the letter F (1943). From 1952 they took the direction of Stein and then Leiva Petersen. After German unification, the project was then led by K. Wachtel but from 1993 by Werner Eck. The final fascicle, for U/V–Z, was published in 2015. The index of names and people integral to the PIR was in the meantime made searchable on the website of the PIR.

Volume 2 of the PIR includes notes for all the well-known Roman senators, the nobles, and some civil servants not of equestrian rank, such as manumitted imperial freedmen who are attested in the literary tradition. Entries in the PIR are indexed by the initial letter of the name, then by the number of the entry, e.g. Tiberius Claudius Pompeianus is cited as PIR^{2} C 973 (the 973rd entry under the letter C).

== See also ==
- Autobiographic Elements in Latin Inscriptions

== Bibliography ==
- Prosopographia Imperii Romani Saec I. II. III (first edition). Part I, II, III. Berlin, 1897–1898.
- Prosopographia Imperii Romani Saec I. II. III (second edition). Berlin, 1933–2015.
- A. H. M. Jones, J. R. Martindale, J. Morris, Prosopography of the Later Roman Empire, Cambridge, 1971–1992
- Werner Eck: The Prosopographia Imperii Romani and Prosopographical Method. In: Averil Cameron (Hrsg.): Fifty Years of Prosopography. The Later Roman Empire, Byzantium and Beyond. University Press, Oxford 2003, S. 11–22, ISBN 0-19-726292-9 (Proceedings of the British Academy, 118).
