= Corpus Inscriptionum Latinarum =

Collection of ancient Latin inscriptions

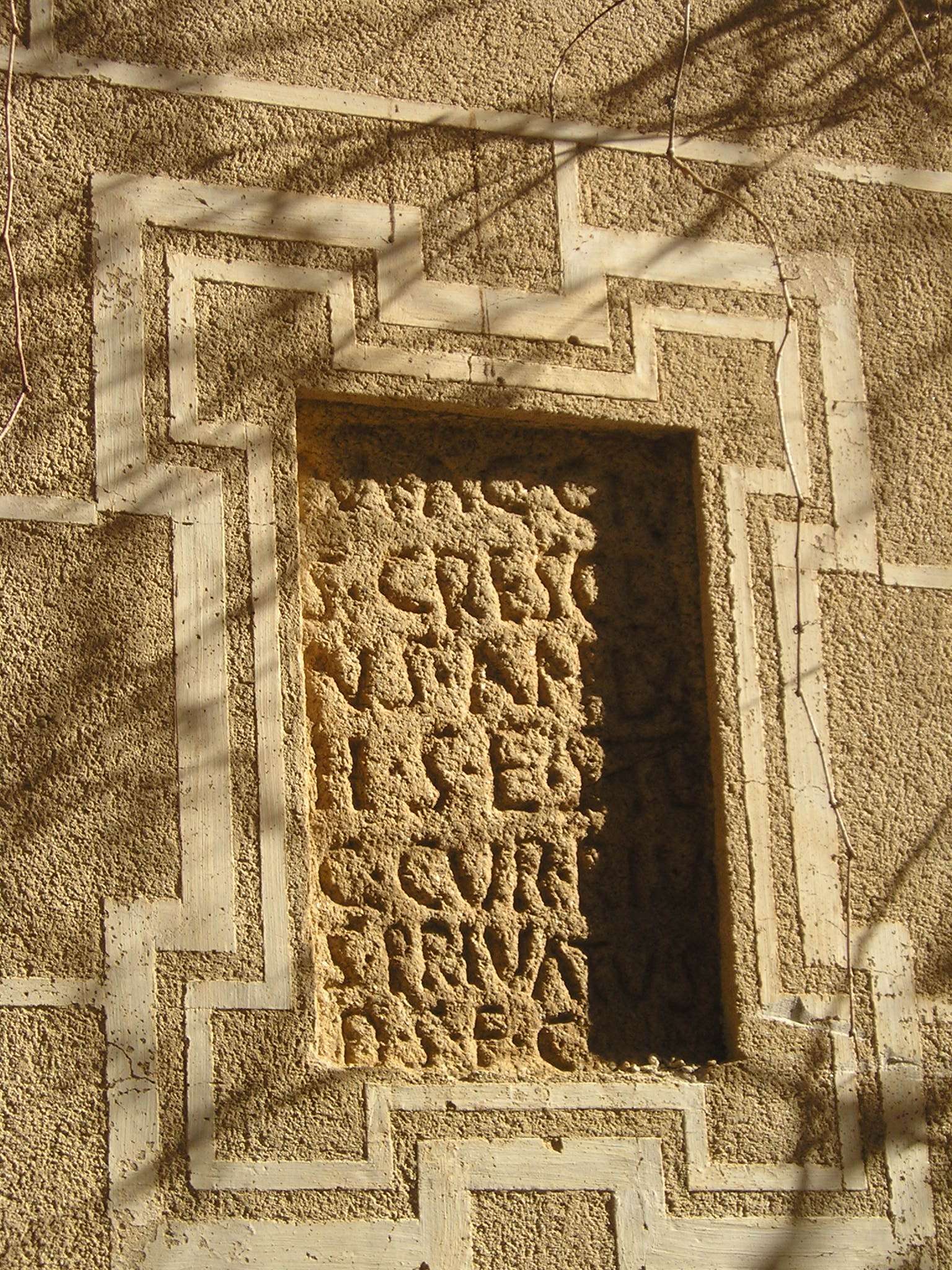
Inscription II 697 in the CIL: in the wall of a building in Cáceres, Spain.

The Corpus Inscriptionum Latinarum (CIL) is a comprehensive collection of ancient Latin inscriptions. It forms an authoritative source for documenting the surviving epigraphy of classical antiquity. Public and personal inscriptions throw light on all aspects of Roman life and history. The Corpus continues to be updated in new editions and supplements.

CIL also refers to the organization within the Berlin-Brandenburg Academy of Sciences and Humanities responsible for collecting data on and publishing the Latin inscriptions. It was founded in 1853 by Theodor Mommsen and is the first and major organization aiming at a comprehensive survey.

== Aim ==
The CIL collects all Latin inscriptions from the whole territory of the Roman Empire, ordering them geographically and systematically. The earlier volumes collected and published authoritative versions of all inscriptions known at the time—most of these had been previously published in a wide range of publications. The descriptions include images of the original inscription if available, drawings showing the letters in their original size and position, and an interpretation reconstructing abbreviations and missing words, along with discussion of issues and problems. The language of the CIL is Latin.

== Beginnings ==
In 1847 a committee was created in Berlin to publish an organized collection of Latin inscriptions, which had previously been described piecemeal by hundreds of scholars over the preceding centuries. The leading figure of this committee was Theodor Mommsen (who wrote several of the volumes covering Italy). Much of the work involved personal inspections of sites and monuments in an attempt to replicate the original as much as possible. In those cases where a previously cited inscription could no longer be found, the authors tried to get an accurate reading by comparing the versions of the published inscription in the works of previous authors who had seen the original. The first volume appeared in 1863.

== Current status ==
The CIL presently consists of 17 volumes in about 70 parts, recording approximately 180,000 inscriptions. Thirteen supplementary volumes have plates and special indices. The first volume, in two sections, covered the oldest inscriptions, to the end of the Roman Republic; volumes II to XIV are divided geographically, according to the regions where the inscriptions were found. The other volumes cover other topics. Volume XVII, for instance, is entirely devoted to milestones. A volume XVIII is planned, which will contain the Carmina Latina Epigraphica (Latin verse inscriptions). A two-volume "Index of Numbers", correlating inscription numbers with volume numbers, was published in 2003.

The Berlin-Brandenburg Academy of Sciences and Humanities (BBAW) continues to update and reprint the CIL.

== Index ==
List of volumes with the date of first publication.

Main Series:

- Vol. I: Inscriptiones Latinae antiquissimae ad C. Caesaris mortem (1893)
- Vol. II: Inscriptiones Hispaniae Latinae (1892), Supplementum
- Vol. III: Inscriptiones Asiae, provinciarum Europae Graecarum, Illyrici Latinae (1873): Pars I, Pars II, Supplementum Pars I, Pars II
- Vol. IV: Inscriptiones parietariae Pompeianae, Herculanenses Stabianae (1871), Supplementum Pars I, Pars II, Pars III, Pars IV
- Vol. V: Inscriptiones Galliae Cisalpinae Latinae (1872), Pars I, Pars II
- Vol. VI: Inscriptiones Urbis Romae Latinae (1876)
- Vol. VII: Inscriptiones Britanniae Latinae (1873)
- Vol. VIII: Inscriptiones Africae Latinae (1881)
- Vol. IX: Inscriptiones Calabriae, Apuliae, Samnii, Sabinorum, Piceni Latinae (1883)
- Vol. X: Inscriptiones Bruttiorum, Lucaniae, Campaniae, Siciliae, Sardiniae Latinae (1883)
- Vol. XI: Inscriptiones Aemiliae, Etruriae, Umbriae Latinae (1888)
- Vol. XII: Inscriptiones Galliae Narbonensis Latinae (1888)
- Vol. XIII: Inscriptiones trium Galliarum et Germaniarum Latinae (1899), Pars I (Fasc. 1, Fasc. 2), Pars II (Fasc. 1, Fasc. 2), Pars III (Fasc. 1, Fasc. 2), Pars IV, Pars V, Pars VI
- Vol. XIV: Inscriptiones Latii veteris Latinae (1887)
- Vol. XV: Inscriptiones Urbis Romae Latinae. Instrumentum domesticum (1891), Pars I, Pars II (Fasc. I)
- Vol. XVI: Diplomata militaria (1936)
- Vol. XVII: Miliaria Imperii Romani (1986)

Auctarium:

- Priscae Latinitatis monumenta epigraphica (1862)
- Exempla scripturae epigraphicae Latinae a Caesaris dictatoris morte ad aetatem Iustiniani (1885)
- Inscriptiones Latinae liberae rei publicae (1965)
- Addenda bibliographica praecipue ad CIL (1965)
- CIL XV 8017–8622. Signacula aenea Corporis inscriptionum Latinarum voluminis XV partis II fasciculo II destinata (1975)
- Die griechischen Personennamen in Rom. Ein Namenbuch. Bd. I–III (1982)
- Quibus locis inveniantur additamenta titulorum voluminis VI Corporis inscriptionum Latinarum. Seorsum expressum ex CIL VI 7, 7 (1986)
- Inscriptionum lapidariarum Latinarum provinciae Norici usque ad annum MCMLXXXIV repertarum Indices (ILLPRON Indices), Fasc. 1 (1986), Fasc. 2 (1987), Fasc. 3 (1987)

Auctarium Series Nova:

- Vol. 1: Index Numerorum. Ein Findbuch zum Corpus Inscriptionum Latinarum. Bd. I–II (2003)
- Vol. 2: Die griechischen Personennamen in Rom. Ein Namenbuch. Bd. I–III. H. Solin. 2., völlig neu bearb. Aufl (2003)
- Vol. 3: Chapeau, Herr Dessau! Zum 150. Geburtstag des Berliner Althistorikers und Epigraphikers. Beiträge eines Kolloquiums und wissenschaftliche Korrespondenz des Jubilars (2009)
- Vol. 4: Öffentlichkeit – Monument – Text. XIV Congressus Internationalis Epigraphiae Graecae et Latinae. 27.–31. Augusti MMXII. Akten (2014)
- Vol. 5: Praeneste tra archeologia ed epigrafia (2021)
- Vol. 6: Heinrich Dressels Edition der Amphoren-Aufschriften aus Rom in CIL XV. Wie Wissen entsteht: von der Gelatine ins Buch (2022)
- Vol. 7: Carmina Latina Epigraphica – Developments, Dynamics, Preferences (2023)
- Vol. 8: Studia militaria et epigraphica (2024)

== See also ==
- Corpus Inscriptionum et Monumentorum Religionis Mithriacae
- Epigraphy
- Inscriptiones Graecae
- Inscriptiones Latinae Selectae
- Prosopographia Imperii Romani
