= Géza Alföldy =

Hungarian historian of classical antiquity (1935–2011)

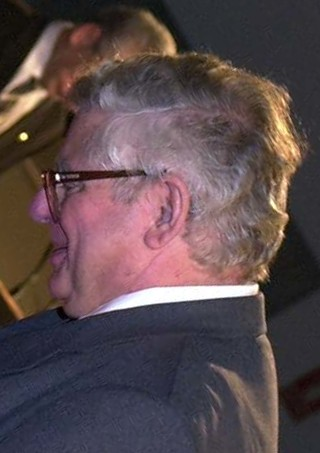
image of Géza Alföldy

Géza Alföldy (June 7, 1935 – November 6, 2011) was a Hungarian historian of ancient history.

== Life ==
Géza Alföldy was born in Budapest. He studied at the Faculty of Humanities of the University of Budapest from 1953 to 1958, where he in 1959 received a doctorate. Alföldy worked at the Budapest city museum from 1957 to 1960, and from 1960 to 1965 he was an assistant professor at the Institute for Ancient History at the University of Budapest. In 1965, he emigrated to West Germany, where he initially worked at the Bonn Rhenanian State Museum from 1965 to 1968. During this time, Alföldy earned a habilitation at the University of Bonn in 1966, where he served as a university lecturer and eventually as a full professor. In the same year he became professor of Ancient History at the Ruhr University Bochum. Alföldy was appointed professor for Ancient History at the University of Heidelberg in 1975 and stayed there until his retirement in 2002. After the renewal of his professorship, Alföldy taught as a substitute professor until 2005. He died in 2011 whilst visiting Athens, Greece.

In 2003, he acted as historical counsel for the two-part historical film "Imperium: Augustus" starring Peter O'Toole.

== Work ==
Alföldys's main fields of research are:

- History and epigraphy of the Roman Empire
- Roman social, military and administrative history
- History of the Roman provinces
- Historiography of the Roman imperial era and late antiquity
- Roman prosopography

In the 1990s, Alföldy also concerned himself with the modern history of his native Hungary.

Within the scope of his epigraphical studies, Gezá Alföldy visited many countries (Albania, Algeria, Austria, Britain, Cyprus, Egypt, France, Greece, Hungary, Italy, Jordan, Libya, Portugal, Spain, Syria, Turkey, Tunisia, and Yugoslavia) in order to research original ancient inscriptions.

Furthermore, Alföldy was a guest professor at the Institute for Advanced Study, Princeton (1972/73), in Rome from 1986 and 2003, in Paris (1991), and Pécs (still in 1993) in Poznań (1992), in Budapest (1993), and also in Barcelona in 1997 and 1998.

In addition, he continued to deliver diverse academic lectures both in and outside Germany, while supervising scores of new academics during their promotion or habilitation phases (more than one dozen alone since 1992).

Alföldy was also co-editor of numerous international academic journals and periodicals. His name was especially associated with the Heidelberger Althistorische Beiträge und Epigraphische Studien (HABES), which he was sole editor from 1986. Alföldy was corresponding member or honorary member of multiple academic societies and academies and a respected member of the Heidelberg Academy since 1978.

Apart from organizations like the Heidelberg Academy, Alföldy also worked at many other German research institutes: the Deutsche Forschungsgemeinschaft and the German Archaeological Institute, as well as at Italian, French, and Spanish facilities for research of classical antiquity.

== Honours ==
=== Honorary doctorates ===
- Autonomous University of Barcelona, Doctor honoris causa, 1988.
- University of Pécs, Doctor honoris causa, 1992
- Eötvös Loránd University of Budapest, Doctor et professor honoris causa, 1992
- University of Lyon III, Doctor honoris causa, 1996
- University of Bologna, Doctor honoris causa, 2002
- Babeş-Bolyai University, Cluj-Napoca, Doctor honoris causa, 2004
- University of Debrecen, Doctor honoris causa, 2005
- Universitat Rovira i Virgili, Tarragona Doctor honoris causa, 2008

=== Other honours ===
- Hungarian Archaeology and Art History Society, Kuzsinszky Medal, 1965 (the medal could not be awarded at that time because of Alföldy's emigration out of Hungary; it was awarded in 1992)
- Gottfried Wilhelm Leibniz Prize of the Deutsche Forschungsgemeinschaft, 1986
- Medal of the University Central of Barcelona, Faculty of Philosophy and Letters of Tarragona, 1988
- Max Planck Research Prize of the Alexander von Humboldt Foundation and the Max Planck Society (obtained together with Silvio Panciera, University of Rome), 1992
- Institut d'Estudis Catalans (Barcelona), Premi Internacional Catalònia de 1997, 1997
- Centro Segoviano, Premios "Tierra de Segovia: sus hijos y sus obras": Premio Andrés Laguna, 1997
- Commemorative insignia of Rome, 1997
- Commemorative insignia of the President of the Hungarian Republic "Nagy Imre" for "prominent work in support of the spirit of the Revolution of 1956", 1997
- Medal of the University of A Coruña – Ferrol, 1998
- Medal of the University of La Rioja, Logroño, 2000
- Medal of the University of Valladolid, 2000
- Creu de San Jordi (Cross of Saint George) of the Catalan government, 2001
- Verdienstkreuz (Federal Cross of Merit) of the 1st class of the Order of Merit of the Federal Republic of Germany, 2002
- University Medal of the University of Heidelberg, 2006 (for his commitment to international exchange)

== Writings ==
- Bevölkerung und Gesellschaft der römischen Provinz Dalmatien. Akadémiai Kiadó, Budapest 1965
- Epigraphische Studien. Rheinland-Verlag, 1968
- Die Hilfstruppen der römischen Provinz Germania inferior. 1968
- Fasti Hispanienses. Senatorische Reichsbeamte und Offiziere in den spanischen Provinzen des römischen Reiches von Augustus bis Diokletian. Steiner, Wiesbaden 1969
- Konsulat und Senatorenstand unter den Antoninen. Prosopographische Untersuchungen zur senatorischen Führungsschicht. Habelt, Bonn 1977
- Sir Ronald Syme, 'Die römische Revolution' und die deutsche Althistorie. 1983
- Römische Sozialgeschichte. 3. Aufl. Steiner, Stuttgart 1984 (Wissenschaftliche Paperbacks. Sozial- und Wirtschaftsgeschichte. Band 8)
- Antike Sklaverei. Widersprüche, Sonderformen, Grundstrukturen. 1988
- Der Obelisk auf dem Petersplatz in Rom. Ein historisches Monument der Antike. Heidelberg 1990
- Ungarn 1956. 1998
- Die römische Gesellschaft. Ausgewählte Beiträge. Steiner, Stuttgart 1998
- Die Krise des Römischen Reiches. Steiner, Stuttgart 1998
- Städte, Eliten und Gesellschaften in der Gallia Cisalpina. Epigraphisch-historische Untersuchungen. Steiner, Stuttgart 1999
- Inschriftliche Denkmäler als Medien der Selbstdarstellung in der römischen Welt. (mit Silvio Panciera) Steiner, Stuttgart 2001
- Römische Sozialgeschichte. 4., völlig überarbeitete und aktualisierte Aufl. Steiner, Stuttgart 2011
