= Quintus Baienus Blassianus =

Roman eques

Quintus Baienus Blassianus was a Roman eques who held a number of military and civilian positions during the reign of the Emperors Antoninus Pius and Marcus Aurelius, including praefectus of the Classis Britannica, and of Roman Egypt.

Blassianus' home, based on the presence of a number of inscriptions, is believed to be Trieste. Based on his filiation, attested in at least one inscription, indicates his father's praenomen was Publius, and his tribe was Pupinia.

== Life ==
The three earliest appointments Blassianus received, which comprise the steps of the tres militiae that equites followed in their military career, are recorded in several inscriptions from Trieste. First was prefect of the Cohors II Asturum equitata, then stationed in Roman Britain; followed by military tribune in Legio VII, either Claudia or Gemina; and lastly prefect of the ala II Gallorum stationed in Cappadocia. Anthony Birley notes that "it would fit the chronology of his career if he obtained a commission from A. Platorius Nepos, governor of Britain 122-4, who was patron of Aquileia, a city close to Blassianus' home".

The remainder of his career in the imperial service is documented in a fragmentary inscription recovered from Ostia Antica honoring him as prefect by the collegium fabrum tignariorum. Blassianus received three civil appointments. The first was procurator of one of the gladiator training schools, the ludus matutinus. The second was procurator ad census accipiendos in Cappadocia. Third was procurator of the provinces of Gallia Lugdunensis and Aquitania. Blassianus then received a military commission as praefectus of the Classis Britannica, which Birley dates to c. 140. This was followed by two governorships: the first was as procurator of Mauretania Tingitana, which J.E.H. Spaul dates to 146–150; next was procurator of Raetia. After these came the signal appointment as praefectus of the Classis Ravennas, the second major fleet of the Roman military.

Blassianus returned to Rome to hold the next two appointments. First was praefectus vigilum, commander of the vigiles or nightwatch of Rome; he may have preceded Gaius Tettius Maximus in this post. Next was an appointment as praefectus annonae; which may have fallen between the tenures of Lucius Volusius Maecianus and Titus Furius Victorinus. His last appointment was as governor of Egypt, one of the most prestigious offices an eques could hold; his tenure in Egypt is dated as extending from 167 to the following year.

The last known event in his life is his prefecture of the collegium honored in the inscription mentioned above. This office has been dated to have fallen between the year 164 and 169. His life after this is not yet known.

Political offices
| Preceded by Titus Flavius Titianus | Prefectus of Aegyptus; 167-168 | Succeeded by Marcus Bassaeus Rufus |
