= Lucius Julius Vehilius Gratus Julianus =

Roman general and praetorian prefect (died 190)

- Died: 190
- Military career
- Rank: Eques
- Conflicts: Parthian War

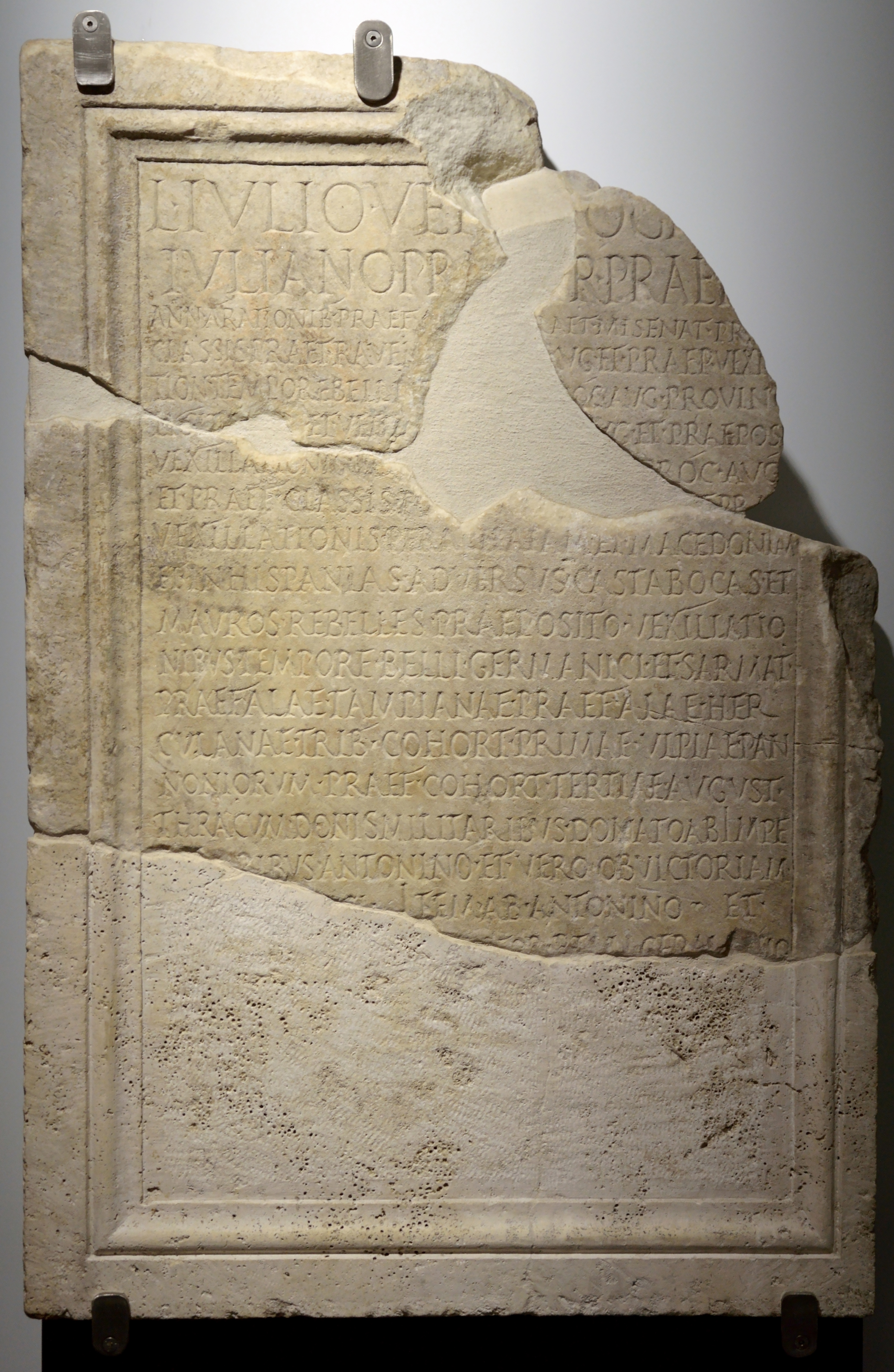
Inscription from Rome (CIL VI, 31856 = ILS 1327)

Lucius Julius Vehilius Gratus Julianus was a soldier and an eques who held a number of military and civilian appointments during the reigns of Marcus Aurelius and his son Commodus. Julianus received honors two separate times for his military service.

His complete cursus honorum is known to us by an inscription from Rome. Although the dona militaria, or military decorations, appears in the last surviving lines of this inscription, the appointments appear to be listed in inverted chronological order: the latest appointments are listed first. The information on this stone is supplemented by other inscriptions as well as mentions in literary sources.

== Career under Marcus Aurelius ==
The first part of his military career fits the typical tres militiae of equites. Julianus began his military career as prefect or commander of cohort III Augusta Thracum which was stationed in Syria; Karol Kłodziński dates his tenure there between 157 and 160. His next commission was as military tribune of cohort I Ulpia Pannoniorum, which was stationed in Pannonia Superior. This assignment is confirmed by an inscription found in Brescia, dated between 154 and 170; Kłodziński dates his tenure there between 160 and 163. His third commission was as prefect of the ala Herculanea, and in this capacity he led the unit in the Parthian War; for his efforts he received military honors. While commanding this unit, he was honored with an inscription found in Palmyra, dated to 167.

His success apparently brought Julianus to the attention of emperor Marcus Aurelius, who was in need of capable generals. In 168 Marcus Aurelius had recalled Marcus Bassaeus Rufus, whom he had just appointed praefectus Aegypti, in order to fill the vacancy in the office of praetorian prefect. Once Rufus had assumed his duties, Marcus Aurelius with his imperial colleague Lucius Verus left Rome for the Danubian provinces, making his base at Carnuntum, headquarters of Legio XIV Gemina, and set about organizing a new command, the praetentura Italiae et Alpium ("the Italian and Alpine front"); the role of Julius Julianus was to be commander of the ala Tampiana, stationed in Noricum, securing the left of Marcus Aurelius.

With the onset of the Marcomannic War, Julianus was plucked from his command in Noricum and put in charge of a series of vexillationes drawn from legions, each tasked to deal with a series of problems which threatened to distract the two emperors from their goal of subduing the Marcomanni. His first assignment was as prepositus against the Germans and Sarmatians, as part of the Marcomannic War. We lack the details of this campaign, which Valerie Maxfield dates to 170, but we know that for his actions he received his second award of military honors from both Marcus and his son Commodus. Julianus received a similar command -- but as procurator -- against the Costoboci who had followed the Marcomanni across the Danube, and had reached as far south as the provinces of Achaea and Macedonia where the soldiers under Julianus fought them. Combined with this was a third assignment, where Julinaus led a third vexallatio against Moors who had crossed into Baetica. The Rome inscription mentions a fourth commission Julianus received, to lead yet another vexillatio combined with the Black Sea fleet against an unnamed enemy.

For his successes in battle, he was given a more sedentary assignment as procurator of the imperial properties in Lusitania and Vettonia; Kłodziński dates his tenure to 177. However, this assignment was cut short when his services were needed in Roman Britain: around 180 that province had been invaded by barbarians who killed a Roman legatus. Although Ulpius Marcellus is given credit for suppressing this invasion and bringing order to the province, he could not manage it alone and gladly accepted the help of an experienced officer like Julianus.

== Career under Commodus ==
At this point Marcus Aurelius died, and his son Commodus succeeded him. Under the new emperor, Julianus was commissioned commander of each of the two major fleets of the Roman Empire; he is one of nine to hold his distinction. First Julianus was prefect of the Classis Ravennas, followed by prefect of the more important fleet, the Classis Misenensis; Werner Eck and Hans Lieb date his tenure of the two respectively to c. 183/184 and c. 184/185. These commissions were followed by his appointment as praefectus a rationibus; Kłodziński dates his tenure in this civilian office to either 183 or 185/186. This was followed by his promotion to praefectus annonae at an unknown date; Henriette Pavis d'Escurac points out this matches the career paths of several other equites, where the office praefectus annonae immediately follows appointment to the head of a rationibus. Julianus was directly succeeded as praefectus annonae by Papirius Dionysius. Because Dionysius was still in Egypt on 23 August 189, we must conclude that Julianus left that position shortly after that date.

Nothing is known of Julianus from when he stepped down from that appointment to the death of Marcus Aurelius Cleander 19 March 190, after which, according to the Historia Augusta, Julianus was appointed as praetorian prefect with Regillus as his colleague. This was an unusual move, as d'Escurac points out: normally the office of prefect of Roman Egypt would be held after the prefecture of the annonae, then the individual would be promoted to praetorian prefect. The only possible explanation she can find is that Cleander had preferred to keep Julianus, a decorated veteran, sidelined. "By barring him access to the prefecture of Egypt, which should normally have followed the prefecture of Annona, Cleander no doubt hoped to deny him the post of praetoran prefect, which Cleander intended to reserve for himself and a few trusted proteges."

An inscription from Ostia Antica dated with the consuls for 190 attests both to Julius Julianus as praetorian prefect and Aelius Julianus as praefectus vigilum.

As praetorian prefect, Julianus had reached the apex of a career few equites reached. But it proved difficult to stay long in the good graces of a master like Commodus: the latter had him thrown fully clothed into a swimming pool, subjected Julianus to various outrages of absurd and humiliating whims, and at last had him put to death at a date after 190 on some excuse.
