= Quintus Marcius Dioga =

Quintus Marcius Dioga was a Roman eques who flourished during the reign of the emperor Septimius Severus and his sons. He was appointed to a series of imperial offices, including praefectus annonae, (overseer of the grain supply for Rome), and praefectus vigilum (commander of the night watch of Rome).

Based on an inscription found in Lepcis Magna to Divus Pius Severus Augustus, led Henriette Pavis d'Escurac to believe Dioga was a native of that African city and "Septimius Severus was responsible for making the fortune of his compatriot, as he had for many others."

When d'Escurac wrote in 1976, Marcius Dioga was known to have held only one office: praefectus annonae sacrae Urbis, previously known as praefectus annonae; Dioga was the first to hold that appointment by that title. The De officio praetoris tutelaris of Ulpian refers to him in that office. But subsequent work has provided more information about this man. A fragmentary inscription recovered from Ostia Antica was restored by M. Cébeillac Gervasoni and F. Zevi to show Dioga was also praefectus vigilum. The dates of these appointments was for a long time in doubt: experts long considered praefectus annonae to be the senior appointment to praefectus vigilum, and dating Dioga's tenure as praefectus annonae between 212 and 217. However, there were no gaps in the known fasti of the prefects of the vigiles to fit Dioga's tenure. Robert Sablayrolles proposed this solution: noting that under the Severian emperors, prefects of the vigiles enjoyed exceptional favor with the emperors, one could think that during this period it took precedence over the praefecti annonae; Sablayrolles dates his tenure as starting in 215 or 216, succeeding Lucius Valerius Datus who held the office from Summer 213 to no later than 216; Dioga's tenure would have extended no later than 217, when Valerius Titanianus is attested as holding it.

Information for the earlier appointments Marcius Dioga held comes from two acephalic inscriptions that had previously identified as referring to the same man, one found in Ostia Antica, the other in Rome, which Michel Christol identified as pertaining to Dioga. The earliest appointment known for Dioga was as military tribune assigned to Legio XII Fulminata, stationed at Melitene in Cappadocia; he could have served during the reign of Commodus This was undoubtedly the second step in the tres militiae that equestrians with military commissions advanced through. The first, commander of a cohors of 500 men was described on a lost line on the two inscriptions. The next known appointment was his commission as praefectus of the Classis Pannonica, a fleet of river boats that patrolled the Danube above the Iron Gates, whose headquarters is believed to be at Taurunum. There is no mention of Dioga commanding a cavalry ala, the expected third step of the tres militiae; Sablayrolles speculates that the line listing this may have been lost from both inscriptions. Or command of the Classis Pannonica may have served as the final step of his tres militiae. Nevertheless, this was Dioga's last military commission.

From there, Marcius Dioga was appointed procurator ab alimentis, or overseer of provisions, then procurator ad census accipiendos trium civitatum Ambianorum, Murrinorum, Atrebatium, or commissioner of the census of the Ambiani, the Morini and the Atrebates in Gallia Lugdunensis. Christol dates this census to 197–199, following the defeat of Clodius Albinus. Over the next decade Dioga held a series of appointments with increasing importance: procurator of the imperial properties in Alexandria; ab epistulis graecis; a libellis; and last a rationibus. Sablayrolles dates these last four appointments during the reign of Caracalla.

Marcius Dioga's life after he stepped down from the praefectus vigilum is unknown. Considering that at this point his career spanned at least 30 years, and our knowledge of mortality rates of the period, it is likely he died soon after.
