= Marcus Valerius Maximianus =

2nd century Roman general

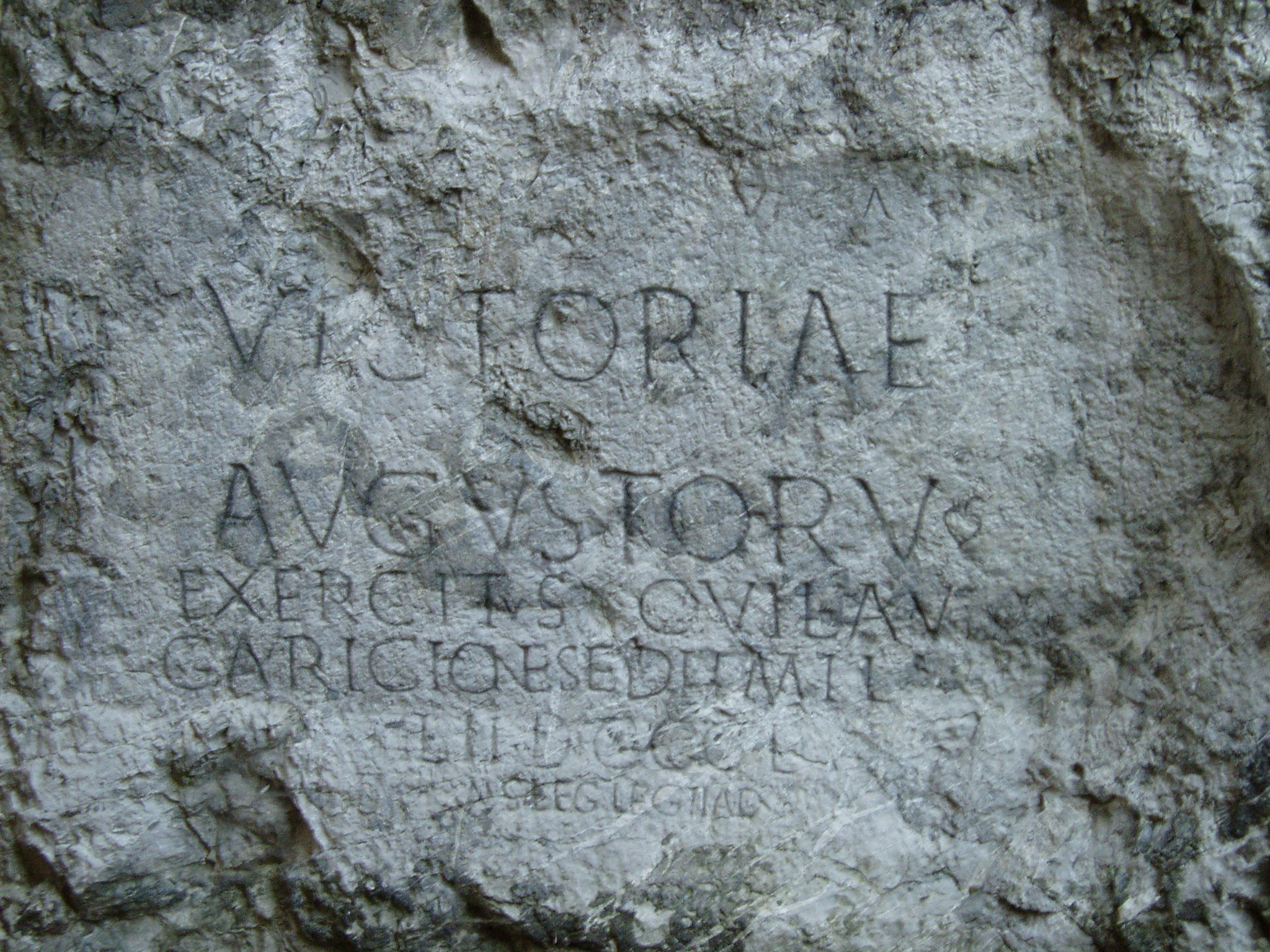
- Roman inscription on the castle rock in Trenčín
- Born: Poetovio, modern-day Ptuj
- Relatives: Marcus Valerius Maximianus, Censor (father)
- Military career
- Allegiance: Roman Empire
- Branch: Roman army Roman navy
- Rank: Legatus legionis
- Units: Classis Misenensis; Classis Ravennatis; Legio I Adiutrix; Legio II Adiutrix; Legio III Augusta; Legio V Macedonica; Legio XIII Gemina
- Conflicts: Revolt of Avidius Cassius, Battle of Laugaricio
- Awards: Chieftain Valao's "horse, decorations and weapons"
- Memorials: Inscriptions at Diana Veteranorum and Laugaricio
- Other work: Governor of Numidia, Suffect Consul, c. 186

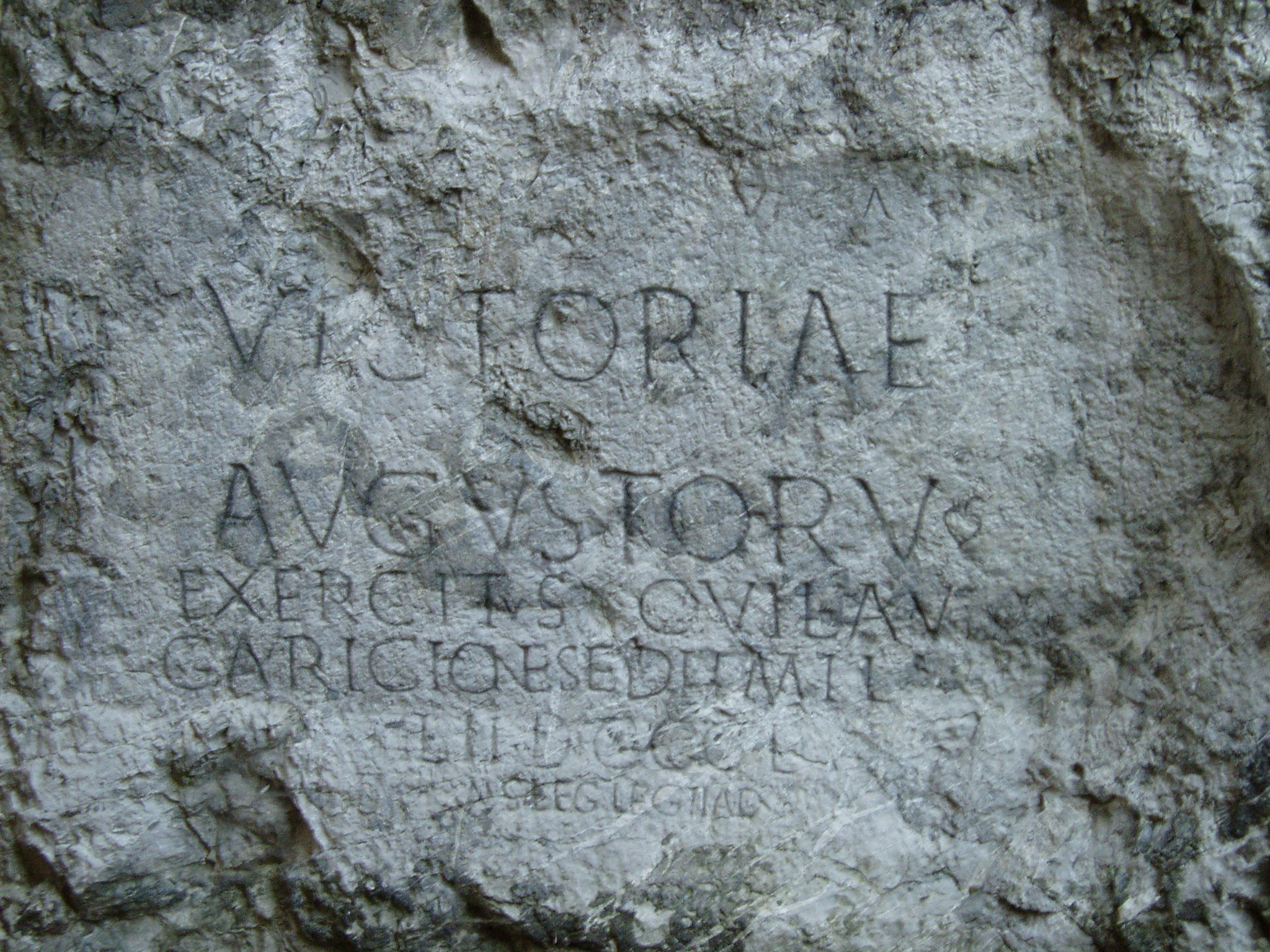
Roman inscription on the castle rock in Trenčín

Marcus Valerius Maximianus was an important Roman general of the period of the Marcomannic Wars during the reign of Marcus Aurelius. He was born (year unknown) in the Roman colony of Poetovio (modern Ptuj, in Slovenia), where his father, also called Marcus Valerius Maximianus, was a local censor and priest. He was decorated for services in the Parthian war of Lucius Verus and was appointed by Marcus Aurelius to ensure the armies in Pannonia were supplied by boats on the Danube.

No surviving ancient writer mentions Marcus Valerius Maximianus, although he was clearly a significant military figure. His career is known to us only from inscriptions, chiefly the one set up by the council of the colony of Diana Veteranorum (Zana) in Numidia when he was governor. The inscription set up in Laugaricio 179 AD (CIL III, 13439) also provides information:

VICTORIAE
AVGVSTORV(m)
EXERCITUS QVI LAV
GARICIONE SEDIT MIL(ites)
L(egionis) II DCCCLV
(Marcus Valerius) MAXIMIANUS LEG(atus) LEG
(ionis) II AD(iutricis) CVR(avit) F(aciendum)

"To the victory of emperors, dedicated by 855 soldiers of the Second Legion of the army stationed in Laugaricio. Made to order of Marcus Valerius Maximianus, legate of the Second Adiutrix legion."

== Life ==
He was placed in charge of detachments of the praetorian fleets of Misenum and Ravenna and also of African and Moorish cavalry used for scouting duties in Pannonia. While on active service with the cavalry Maximianus killed a Germanic chieftain named as "Valao, chief of the Naristi" with his own hand and was publicly praised by the Emperor, who granted him the chieftain's "horse, decorations and weapons". He was appointed prefect of the lance-bearing cavalry and was in charge of the cavalry on the expedition to Syria to quell the revolt of Avidius Cassius in 175. Maximianus was then appointed procurator of Moesia Inferior; at the same time he was given a command to drive out brigands from the borders of Macedonia and Thrace.

It appears Maximianus enjoyed Marcus Aurelius's confidence, for he was then successively procurator of Moesia Superior and Dacia Porolissensis, after which he was adlected into the Senate with praetorian rank. He commanded as legatus legionis first Legio I Adiutrix, then Legio II Adiutrix, Legio V Macedonica, Legio XIII Gemina and Legio III Augusta – an almost unprecedented series of legionary commands. He was in charge of the winter quarters at Laugaricio (modern Trenčín, in Slovakia), where the final battle of the Second Marcomannic War was fought, and was afterwards decorated for his services in the Sarmatian War by the Emperor Commodus. After this he governed Numidia. Maximianus was suffect consul around 186. It is not known when he died.

== See also ==
- Trenčín
