= Marcus Macrinius Vindex =

Roman general and praetorian prefect (died 172)

Marcus Macrinius Vindex was a Roman eques who held a number of senior positions during the reign of the Emperor Marcus Aurelius, including praetorian prefect.

The family origins of the Macrinii Vindices are unusual. The nomen Macrinus, may be of Celtic origin; Anthony Birley notes the name "may have been of Celtic origin, perhaps from Cologne". Birley also notes the possibility – "however remote" – that Vindex came from Camulodunum (modern Colchester) in Britannia. Of interest is Marcus Macrinius Avitus Catonius Vindex, an eques who was adlected into the Roman Senate and advanced to the consulate. Géza Alföldy is confident that this Vindex was the father of the younger Vindex, while Birley merely states that the older Vindex "perhaps" was the father of the younger. There is a third known member of this gens, Macrinius Regulus, who is thought by some to be the brother of this Vindex.

The first known office Vindex is known to have been appointed to was procurator of Dacia Porolissensis; evidence points to him holding this from 24 September 151 through 27 September 154.

In 169 Vindex was appointed the colleague of praetorian prefect Marcus Bassaeus Rufus. Both were selected to help with the threat posed by the Marcomanni on the Danube frontier; the previous praetorian prefect, Titus Furius Victorinus, had been killed the year before in battle with these Germanic invaders. An inscription recovered from Saepinum (modern Sepino) shows their responsibilities covered more than military matters: it records their response to a petition from the imperial freedman Cosmus concerning the management of the imperial flocks. Victories followed for the Romans, only to conclude with Vindex's death in 172.
