= Aelius Antipater =

Greek sophist and rhetorician

Aelius Antipater or Antipater of Hierapolis (Ancient Greek: Αἴλιος Ἀντίπατρος; fl. AD 200) was a Greek sophist and rhetorician.

He was a son of Zeuxidemus, and a pupil of Adrianus, Pollux, and Zeno. In his orations, both extempore and written, some of which are mentioned by Philostratus, Antipater was not superior to his contemporaries, but in the art of writing letters he is said to have excelled all others, and for this reason the emperor Severus made him his private secretary and tutor (ab epistulis) of his two sons Caracalla and Geta. He was promoted to the consular rank in his early 50s by Septimius Severus, who sent him to govern Bithynia and Pontus. Yet, since Antipater used his sword too freely, he was deprived of his office. As Philostratus reports, Antipater then retired to his native place, where he died at the age of 68 of voluntary starvation.

His nomen is derived from the Aelia gens, which would indicate that an ancestor of his had received Roman citizenship while Trajan or Hadrian was emperor (since Aelius was their family name). He also wrote a lost biography of Severus.

== Sources ==
- Paul M. M. Leunissen, Konsuln und Konsulare in der Zeit von Commodus bis Severus Alexander (180-235 n.Chr.) (Amsterdam: Gieben, 1989), p. 261.
- James H. Oliver, "The Sacred Gerusia and the Emperor's Consilium", Hesperia, 36 (1967), pp. 329–335.
- Fergus Millar, "The Greek East and Roman Law: The Dossier of M. Cn. Licinius Rufinus", Journal of Roman Studies, 89 (1999), pp. 90–108.
