= A cognitionibus =

In Ancient Rome, a cognitionibus was one of the four offices in the chancellor's Imperial Rome office that helped the emperor in his judicial function. It was a formal office function, like the ad legationes.

With the restoration in Hadrian's era, it is possible that the office a libellis dominated the other three: a cognitionibus, a studiis and a censibus. A studiis was a documentation office, and a cognitionibus was the office that studied the process of the emperor's appeal. A correspondence office (ab epistulis) and an office that controlled the Roman Empire's finances (a rationibus) existed.

In the Third century the offices of a libellis and a censibus or a libellis and a cognitionibus were merged.

Marcius Agrippa was a cognitionibus and ab epistulis of Caracalla.

== Popular culture ==
The a cognitionibus appears in works of Cassius Dio and Philostratus performing a job that arranges the order of cases before the emperor and summoning litigants into the auditorium.

== Bibliography ==
- Millar, Fergus (2005). Rome, the Greek World, and the East: Government, Society, and Culture in the Roman Empire. Vol. 2. Univ of North Carolina Press. p. 504. ISBN 9780807863695.
