= Legio II Adiutrix =

Roman legion

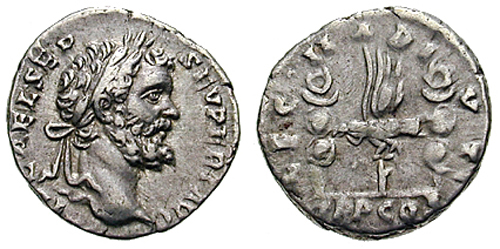
II Adiutrix supported Septimius Severus, commander of the Pannonian army, in his fight for the purple. This denarius was struck to celebrate the legion.

Map of the Roman Empire in AD 125, under emperor Hadrian, showing the Legio II Adiutrix, stationed on the river Danube at Aquincum (Budapest, Hungary), in Pannonia Inferior province, from AD 106 to at least 269

Legio II Adiutrix ("Second Legion, the Rescuer") was a legion of the Imperial Roman army founded in AD 70 by the emperor Vespasian (r. 69–79), originally composed of Roman navy marines of the classis Ravennatis. There are still records of II Adiutrix in the Rhine border in the beginning of the 4th century. The legion's symbols were a Capricorn and Pegasus.

== History ==
The formation of Legio II Adiutrix from marines of the classis Ravennatis following the Year of Four Emperors was due to the machinations of the commander of the Roman fleets, Sextus Lucilius Bassus. Bassus' intentions was to incite those men to desert Vitellius in support of Vespasian, but his intrigue was so poorly handled that while the marines decided to support Vespasian, lost his command, Cornelius Fuscus was sent to take command of the marines, and Bassus was sent to Vespasian to determine his fate.

The first assignment of II Adiutrix was in Germania Inferior, where the Batavian rebellion was at its peak. After the defeat of the rebels, Legio II Adiutrix followed general Quintus Petillius Cerialis to Roman Britain where it replaced Legio XIV Gemina bringing the strength of the garrison in that province to four legions. The legion is believed to have made its base camp at Chester.

In 87, the legion was recalled to the continent to participate in the Dacian wars of emperor Domitian. There it made its new base at Aquincum (modern Budapest). Around 95 and 96, still in Dacia, the later emperor Hadrian served as military tribune in Legio II Adiutrix.

In the summer of 106 the legion took part to the siege of the Dacian Capital Sarmisegetusa. After Trajan's Dacian Wars of 101–106, the legion returned to Pannonia Inferior, where it would remain for the years to come. Despite this, the legion or vexillations or subunits took part in:

- Lucius Verus's campaign against the Parthian Empire (162–166)
- Marcus Aurelius' campaign against the Marcomanni and the Quadi (171–173)
- Marcus Aurelius' campaign against the Quadi (179–180). The Legion was commanded by Marcus Valerius Maximianus in Laugaricio.
- Caracalla's campaign against the Alemanni (213)
- Gordian's campaign against the Sassanid Empire (238)

In 193, Legio II Adiutrix supported emperor Septimius Severus during his struggle for the purple.

== Attested members ==
Name	Rank	Time frame	Province	Source
Lucius Artorius Castus	centurio	between 150 and 250	Aquincum	CIL III, 1919
Decimus Terentius Gentianus	legatus legionis	c. 116	Parthian War	TLMN4, 4
Quintus Antistius Adventus	legatus legionis	162–c. 165	Parthian War	AE 1893, 88 = ILS 8977; AE 1914, 281; CIL VIII, 18893 = ILS 1091
Marcus Valerius Maximianus	legatus legionis	179	Laugaricio	AE 1956, 124
Quintus Ranius Terentius Honoratianus Festus	legatus legionis	between 200 and 250		AE 1965, 240
Aurelius Pollion	miles?		Pannonia	Papyrus from Tebtunis
Marcus Vettius C.f. Latronus	tribunus angusticlavius	before 99		AE 1951, 52
Titus Furius Victorinus	tribunus angusticlavius	before 140	Aquincum	CIL VI, 41143
Publius Cominius Clemens	tribunus angusticlavius	c. 162—165	Parthian War	AE 1890, 151
Publius Aelius Hadrianus	tribunus laticlavius	c. 95		Historia Augusta, "Hadrian", 3

== Epigraphic inscriptions ==
- Gaio Valerio Crispo veterano ex legione II Adiutrice Pia Fideli. Chester (Deva), U.K. RIB 478.

- Lucius Terentius Claudia tribu Fuscus Apro miles legionis II Adiutricis Piae Fidelis. Chester, U.K. RIB 477.

- Lucius Valerius Luci filius Claudia tribu Seneca Savaria / miles legionis II Adiutricis Piae Fidelis. Chester, U.K. RIB 480.

- Gaius Calventius Gai filius Claudia tribu Celer Apro miles legionis II Adiutricis Piae Fidelis / Vibi Clementis (...). Chester, U.K. RIB 475.

- Gaius Iuventius Gai filius Claudia tribu Capito Apro / miles legionis II Adiutricis Piae Fidelis / Iuli Clementis annorum XL stipendiorum XVII. Chester, U.K. RIB 476.

- Quintus Valerius Quinti filius Claudia tribu Fronto Celea / miles legionis II Adiutricis Piae Fidelis annorum L stipendiorum XXṾ (...). Chester, U.K. RIB 479.

- Voltimesis P̣udens Gai filius Sergia tribu Augusta eques legionis II Adiutricis Piae Fidelis annorum XXXII stipendiorum XIII hic situs est. Chester, U.K. RIB 482.

- Gaius Murrius Gai filius Arniensis Foro Iuli Modestus miles legionis II Adiutricis Piae Fidelis / Iuli Secundi annorum) XXV stipendiorum / hic situs est. Bath, U.K. (Aquae Sulis). RIB 157 = CIL VII, 48.

- Titus Valerius Titi filius Claudia tribu Pudens Savaria miles legionis II Adiutricis Piae Fidelis / Dossenni Proculi annorum XXX aera VI heres de suo posuit hic situs est. Lincoln (Lindum), U.K. RIB 258 = CIL VII, 185.

- legionis II Adiutricis Piae Fidelis / Ponti Proculi Lucius Licinius Luci filius Galeria tribu Saliga Lugdunonnorum XX stipendiorum II. Lincoln (Lindum), U.K. RIB 253 = CIL VII, 186.

- Quintus Cumelius / Quinti filius / Fabia Celer Bracarensis / veteranus legionis II Adiutricis hic situs annorum LXXV (...). Astorga (Asturica), Spain. CIL II, 2639.

- Fortunae Balneari sacrum / Valerius Bucco miles legionis II Adiutricis Piae Fidelis / decuria Aemili (...). Segovia, Spain. CIL II, 2763.

- VICTORIAE AVGVSTORV(m) EXERCITUS QVI LAV GARICIONE SEDIT MIL(ites) L(egionis) II DCCCLV (Marcus Valerius) MAXIMIANUS LEG(atus) LEG (ionis) II AD(iutricis) CVR(avit) F(aciendum). Laugaricio (today Trenčín), Slovakia.

== See also ==
- List of Roman legions
- Roman legion
