= Titinius =

Titinius may refer to:

- Lucius Titinius Pansa Saccus, consular tribune in 400 BC and 396 BC
- Marcus Titinius, magister equitum in 302 BC
- Gaius Titinius Gadaeus, bandit in slave revolt used by Gaius Marius
- Titinius (poet), poet, earliest known composer of tabernariae, survived Terence, only fragments extant
- Titinius (centurion) (died 42 BC), soldier who fought at the Battle of Phillipi in the army of Gaius Cassius Longinus
- Gnaeus Octavius Titinius Capito, official and writer in the 1st–2nd century AD

== See also ==
- Titinia gens
