= Tiberius Claudius Secundinus Lucius Statius Macedo =

Tiberius Claudius Secundinus Lucius Statius Macedo was a Roman eques who held a number of appointments in the second century AD, the best known of which was praefectus annonae, or overseer of the food supply of Rome. Macedo is known only from a series of inscriptions.

His public career is recorded in two inscriptions from Aquileia, which is considered his home town. His first set of appointments were military, typical of the tres militiae. His earliest recorded post was primipilus of Legio IV Flavia Felix, then stationed in Moesia Superior. Macedo returned to Rome where he held a series of commissions: first military tribune of cohort I of the vigiles; then tribune of cohort XI of the Cohortes urbanae; followed by tribune of cohort VIIII of the Praetorian Guard; and then primipilus a second time. Macedo was then commissioned praefectus or commander of Legio II Traiana Fortis, stationed in Roman Egypt. Because Egypt was governed by an eques, and a commander of a legion would need to be of a lower rank than the governor, this prevented senators from being commissioned commanders of any legion in that province.

Once he stepped down from command of Legio II Trajana, Macedo was appointed to a series of administrative posts. The first one was procurator of the vicesima hereditatium. This was followed with procurator of the imperial estates in Gallia Lugdunensis and Gallia Aquitania. Macedo then returned to Rome to serve as a rationibus; Henriette Pavis D'Escurac believes he immediately succeeded Gaius Julius Celsus in this post, and dates it at some point after 144. Following this, Macedo was promoted to praefectus annonae; according to D'Escurac he succeeded Marcus Petronius Honoratus who was promoted to praefectus of Egypt in 147.

After his tenure as praefectus annonae ended, his life is a blank.
