= Lucius Munatius Felix =

2nd century Roman eques, official and governor

Lucius Munatius Felix was a Roman eques who held a number of appointments during the reign of the Emperor Antoninus Pius, most notably praefectus or governor of Roman Egypt (149-154).

Eric Birley suggests that Felix had his origins in Africa. It is unknown how he is related to other Munatii. About his career, although it can be assumed Felix passed through the tres militiae, the only office attested for him is his tenure as governor of Egypt, an important post because Egypt provided a large share of the grain needed to feed Rome.

The duties of the praefectus extended beyond ensuring that this was furnished so the inhabitants of the city were fed. He commanded the troops stationed there: during years Felix was responsible for the province, two legions were based there, Legio III Cyrenaica and Legio XXII Deiotariana. He also managed the financial and judicial affairs of the province. Records of his decisions have survived. One is a record of a hearing, dated 17 April 150, where the petition of two men -- Glycon son of Dionysius, and Apollonius son of Glycon -- requesting that since Glycon was without means he be allowed to abandon his property; Felix responded by ordering an investigation to determine whether Glycon intended to do this to defraud his creditors, and if so, the resignation will not be valid.

Another duty involved an incident recorded by Justin Martyr in his First Apology. Justin records that "one of our number" petitioned Felix to allow a surgeon to make him a eunuch, for surgeons in Egypt "were forbidden to do this without the permission of the governor". Justin explains that the Christian desired this in order to avoid all sexual promiscuity. Despite the motivation, Felix refused to approve this petition. Nevertheless, the man remained single and "was satisfied with his own approving conscience, and the approval of those who thought as he did." This mention of Felix not only allows us to fix a terminus a quo for the publication of his work, it is possibly the earliest datable mention of a Christian community in Egypt.

Political offices
Preceded by Marcus Petronius Honoratus	Prefectus of Aegyptus; 150-154	Succeeded by Marcus Sempronius Liberalis
