= Lucius Volusius Maecianus =

Roman jurist, official and governor (c.110–175)

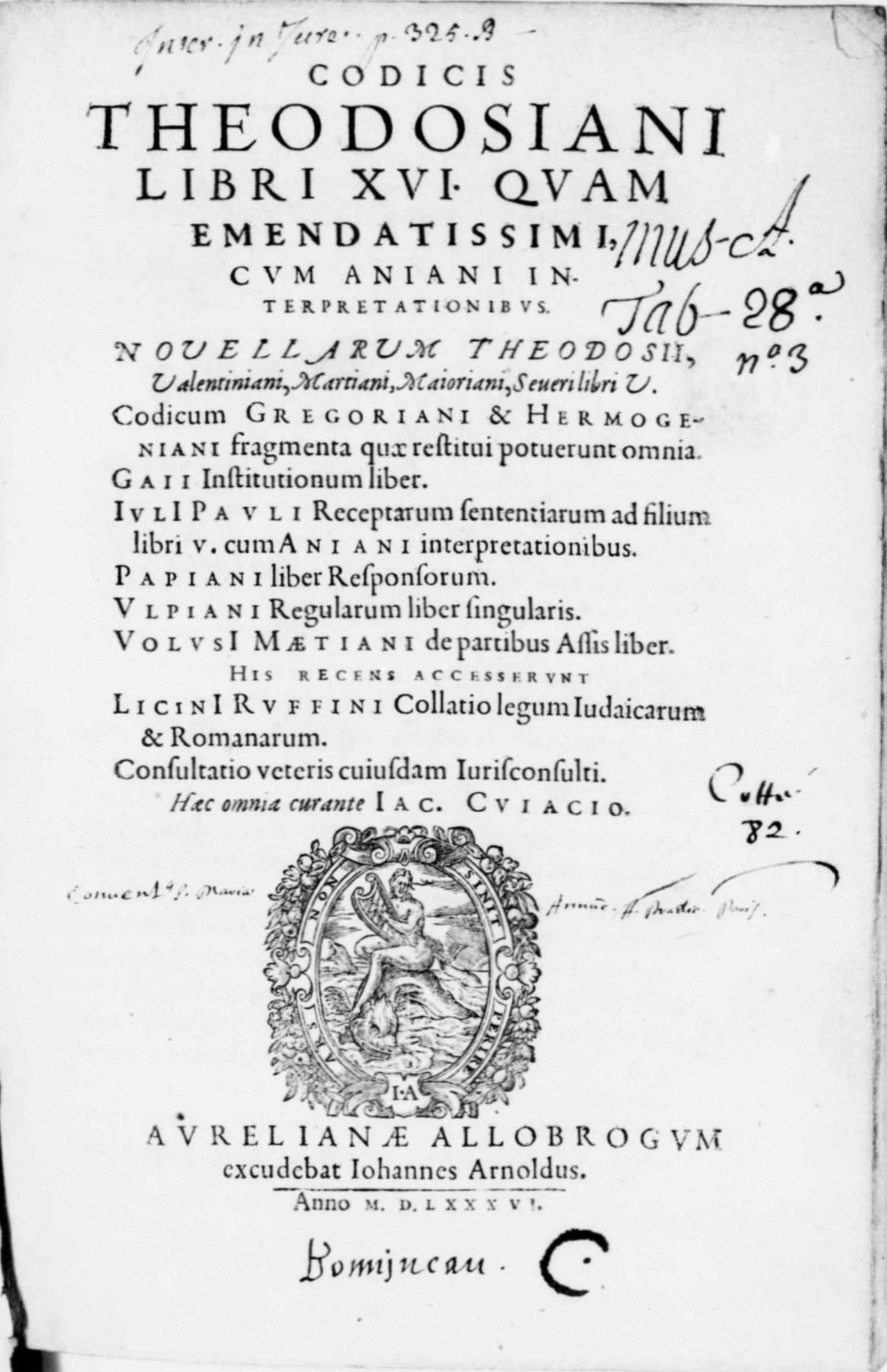
Maecianus, Lucius Volusius – Codex Theodosianus, 1586

Lucius Volusius Maecianus (c. 110 – 175) was a Roman jurist, who advised the Emperor Antoninus Pius on legal matters, as well educating his son the future Marcus Aurelius in the subject. Originally of the equestrian class, Maecianus held a series of imperial offices culminating with prefect of Egypt in 161, when Marcus Aurelius adlected him inter praetorios, or with the rank of praetor, into the Roman Senate. Maecianus was suffect consul in an undetermined nundinium around AD 166.

We can follow his career as an eques from an inscription set up in Ostia to honor Maecianus as the patron of that colonia. This inscription attests that he was prefect of the Cohort I Aelia classica, and prefectus fabrum, two steps in the tres militiae of the equestrian class. The next notable office was a sinecure from the emperor Antoninus Pius himself: prefectus vehiculorum, or director of the public post. According to Anthony Birley this was done so Maecianus "could remain in Rome, where he would be available to give advice on legal problems in the council -- one of those experts to whom, Marcus [Aurelius] relates, Pius was so ready to listen." Other positions he held in Rome include a studiis, a libellis (also known as ab epistulis), and a censibus.

At this point Maecianus was promoted to senior equestrian offices. The first was Praefectus annonae, or overseer of the grain supply for the capital city. Next was prefect of Egypt in 161, the largest province governed by an eques. It was after Marcus Annaeus Syriacus succeeded him in Egypt that Maecianus was admitted into the Senate.

Following his promotion to the Senate, Marcus Aurelius appointed Maecianus prefect of the aerarium Saturni so, as Birley explains, the emperor "was able to keep this eminent lawyer, his former tutor, by his side." His suffect consulate followed a few years later.

== Writings ==
Maecianus was the author of a monograph on trusts (fideicommissa) in 16 books, another on the Judicia publica, and a third on the Rhodian laws relating to maritime affairs. His treatise on numerical divisions, weights and measures (Assis distributio), is extant, with the exception of the concluding portion. An edition by Emil Seckel and B. Klübler, was published as part of Huschke, Jurisprudentiae anteiustinianae reliquias, vol. 1 (1908).

Political offices
Preceded by Titus Furius Victorinus	Prefectus of Aegyptus; 161	Succeeded by Marcus Annaeus Syriacus
