= Titinia gens =

Ancient Roman plebeian family

The gens Titinia was a minor plebeian family at ancient Rome. Members of this gens are mentioned as early as the time of the decemvirs, but only a few held any magistracies, and none of them ever attained the consulship.

== Origin ==
The nomen Titinius belongs to a class of gentilicia formed using the suffix -inius, typically used to derive nomina from other gentilicia, or from surnames ending in -inus. In this instance, the name is likely derived from the nomen Titius, which in turn was formed from the praenomen Titus, and was reckoned a gentilicium of Sabine origin.

== Praenomina ==
The chief praenomina of the Titinii during the Republic were Marcus and Gaius. The earliest Titinii mentioned in history also used Lucius and Sextus, while in a later period we find Publius, Quintus, and Gnaeus. All of these were amongst the most common names at all periods of Roman history.

== Members ==
This list includes abbreviated praenomina. For an explanation of this practice, see filiation.

- Marcus Titinius, tribune of the plebs in 449 BC.
- Sextus Titinius, tribune of the plebs in 439 BC.
- Lucius Titinius Pansa Saccus, consular tribune in 400 and 396 BC.
- Marcus C. f. C. n. Titinius, magister equitum in 302 BC to Gaius Junius Bubulcus Brutus.
- Publius Titinius, legate in 200 BC, during the war against the Gauls.
- Publius Titinius Menas, a Roman citizen who brought the first barber to Rome.
- Marcus Titinius, tribune of the plebs in 193 BC.
- Gaius Titinius, tribune of the plebs in 193 BC.
- Marcus Titinius Curvus, praetor urbanus in 178 BC. He levied troops at Rome in this year, and gave an audience of the Senate to Tiberius Sempronius Gracchus and Lucius Postumius Albinus on their return from Spain.
- Marcus Titinius, praetor in 178 BC, assigned to Nearer Spain with the title of proconsul, and governed it for four years, until 174. In 171, he was accused of malversation in the province, but was acquitted.
- Gaius Titinius Gadaeus, one of the leaders of a slave revolt in Sicily; he betrayed an important fort to the praetor Publius Licinius Nerva in 103 BC.
- Marcus Titinius, a legate of Licinius Nerva during the Servile War in Sicily; he was defeated by the slaves.
- Gaius Titinius, the husband of Fannia who concealed Marius in 88 BC.
- Gnaeus Titinius, a distinguished Roman eques, who resisted the tribune Marcus Livius Drusus in 91 BC.
- Titinii, mentioned among the people of property proscribed by Sulla and murdered by Catiline in 81 BC.
- Quintus Titinius, one of the judges at the trial of Verres in 70 BC, was a brother of Gaius Fannius, a Roman eques. This Titinius carried on the business of a moneylender, and as such Cicero had dealings with him. On the breaking out of the Civil War in 49 BC, he espoused the cause of Pompey, but his son, who had been adopted by one Pontius, and who is therefore called Pontius Titinianus, sided with Caesar.
- Titinius, a centurion in the army of Cassius at the battle of Philippi in 42 BC, was sent by his commander, after his defeat by Antony, to see how Brutus had fared; but as Titinius did not return so soon as was expected, Cassius, supposing all was lost, put an end to his own life. Titinius, on his arrival, killed himself over the body of Cassius, to atone for his involuntary error.
- Titinius, legate of Octavian in his war with Sextus Pompeius.
- Gaius Titinius, a name that appears on coins, cannot be reliably connected to any of the Titinii mentioned in history.
- Titinius, a poet, is the earliest known composer of tabernariae. He survived Terence, but only fragments survive.
- Gnaeus Octavius Titinius Capito, a civil servant and writer of the late first and early second century.

== See also ==
- List of Roman gentes
- Titinius (disambiguation)

== Bibliography ==
- Marcus Tullius Cicero, Epistulae ad Atticum, In Verrem, Pro Cluentio.
- Quintus Tullius Cicero, De Petitione Consulatus (attributed).
- Diodorus Siculus, Bibliotheca Historica (Library of History).
- Titus Livius (Livy), History of Rome.
- Valerius Maximus, Factorum ac Dictorum Memorabilium (Memorable Facts and Sayings).
- Lucius Mestrius Plutarchus (Plutarch), Lives of the Noble Greeks and Romans.
- Appianus Alexandrinus (Appian), Bellum Civile (The Civil War).
- Dictionary of Greek and Roman Biography and Mythology, William Smith, ed., Little, Brown and Company, Boston (1849).
- George Davis Chase, "The Origin of Roman Praenomina", in Harvard Studies in Classical Philology, vol. VIII, pp. 103–184 (1897).
- David B. Kaufman, "Roman Barbers", in The Classical Weekly, No. 25 (March 21, 1932).
- This article incorporates text from a publication now in the public domain: Smith, William (1870). "Titinius". In Smith, William (ed.). Dictionary of Greek and Roman Biography and Mythology. Vol. 3. p. 1158.
