= Marcus Sempronius Liberalis =

2nd century Roman eques, military commander and governor

Marcus Sempronius Liberalis was a Roman eques who held a number of appointments during the reign of the Emperor Marcus Aurelius. He is known from military diplomas and non-literary papyrus.

Liberalis was born in Acholla, located in what is Tunisia. His relationship to other members of the Sempronii is unknown.

His first attested appointment was his commission as commander of the ala I Gallorum Tauriana victrix in 129/130, which at the time was stationed in Mauretania Tingitana; this may have been a step in his tres militiae. His next known appointment was as praefectus or governor of Rhaetia from at least 30 October 139 to at least as late as November or December 140.

His last known appointment was one of the most senior posts of an equestrian career, praefectus or governor of Roman Egypt from 154 to 159. It was important because Egypt provided a large share of the grain needed to feed Rome. Not only did the governor have command of the troops stationed there -- during his tenure two legions were based in Egypt, Legio III Cyrenaica and Legio XXII Deiotariana -- he managed the financial and judicial affairs. Excerpts from his assizes as he held legal hearings around Egypt have survived in a papyrus at the University of Michigan.

Political offices
Preceded by Lucius Munatius Felix	Prefectus of Aegyptus; 154-159	Succeeded by Titus Furius Victorinus
