= Claudius Athenodorus =

Roman eques

Claudius Athenodorus was a Roman eques who flourished during the reign of the emperor Domitian. He was appointed to a series of imperial offices, including praefectus annonae for the city of Rome.

Hans-Georg Pflaum noted that Athenodorus is the Greek translation of the Syrian Vaballath. This, combined with an inscription attesting that he was imperial procurator of Roman Syria during the reign of Domitian, led Pflaum to conclude Athenodorus was a native of that province. The gentilicium "Claudius" suggests that he became a citizen of Rome during the reign of emperor Claudius.

The other appointment Athenodorus is known to have held was praefectus annonae or overseer in charge of the public dole of bread for the inhabitants of Rome. Because he is the only known procurator of the imperial properties who advanced to this prefecture, it is difficult to estimate the lapse of time that could have elapsed between the two functions. Henriette Pavis d'Escurac dated his procuratorship of Syria to the earlier part of the reign of Domitian, and his prefecture of the public dole to the last eight years of Domitian's rule, between Marcus Mettius Rufus and Gaius Minicius Italus, which would be c. 88 to c. 96.

Except for these two appointments, nothing more is known of Claudius Athenodorus.
