= Gaius Maesius Tertius =

Gaius Maesius Tertius (c. 1st century – c. 2nd century) was a Roman civil servant and officer active at the beginning of the 2nd century AD. According to a military diploma issued on 14 October 109 found in Valentia Banasa in the Mauritania Tingitana province in year 109 AD he was praefectus (commander) of the ala I Hamiorum sagittariorum. In 113 AD he was subpraefectus vigilum in Rome (the first person known serving under this office). Tertius was inscribed in the Tribe Palatina.
