= Claudius Apollinaris =

Claudius Apollinaris was a man of ancient Rome who succeeded Sextus Lucilius Bassus as the commander, or praefectus classis, of Lucius Vitellius's fleet at Misenum, when Bassus defected to Vespasian's side in the year 70 AD. Apollinaris himself soon defected to Vespasian as well, and he escaped with six galleys.
