= Gnaeus Octavius Titinius Capito =

Roman knight

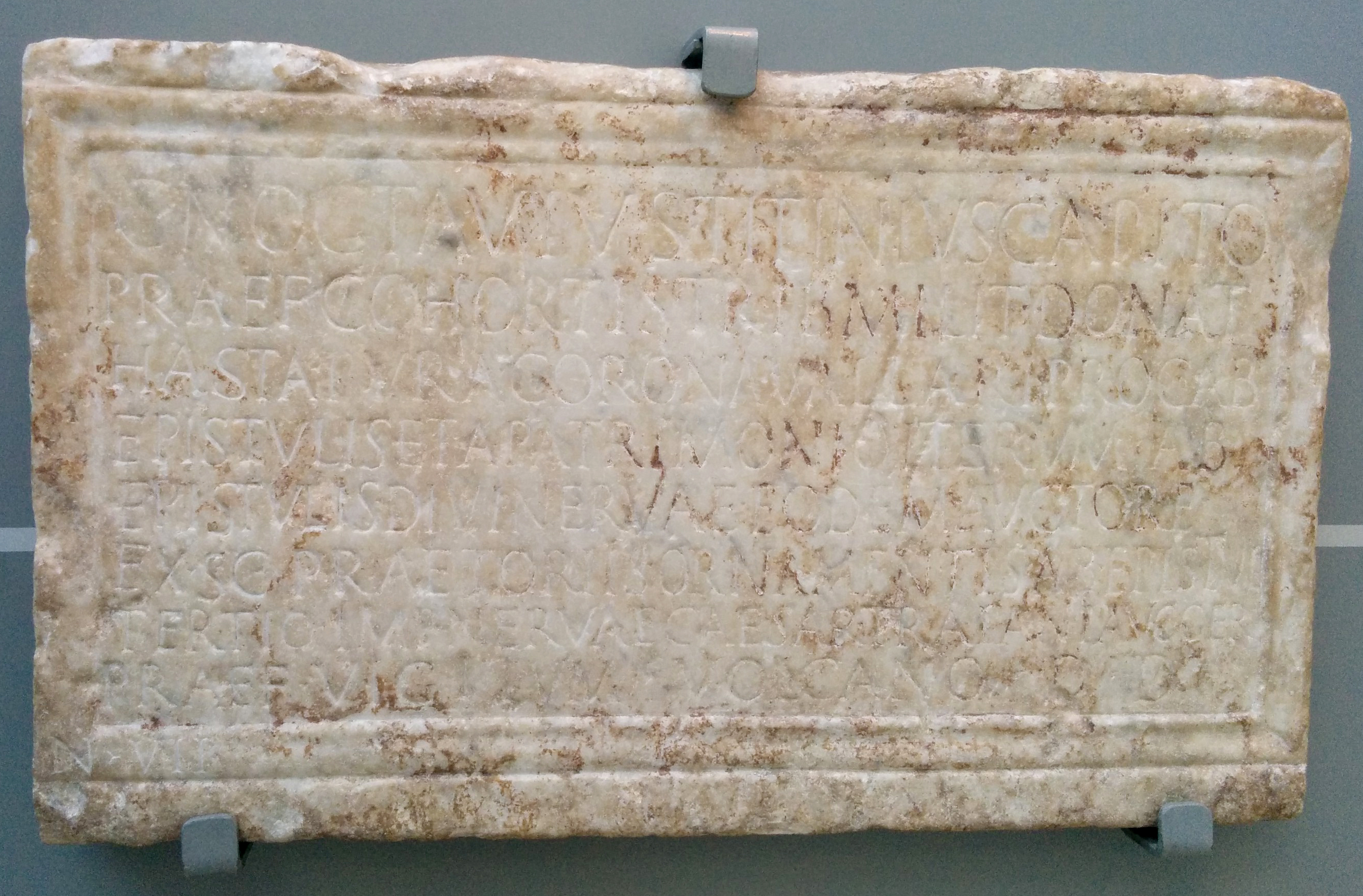
Roman Inscription showing the cursus Honorum of Gnaeus Octavius Titinius Capito

Gnaeus Octavius Titinius Capito (- 1st century, - 2nd century) was a Roman eques, officer, and civil servant active during the first and second century AD.

== Life ==
A member of the Titinia gens, he served successfully in the army, later becoming secretary ab epistulis under the Emperors Domitian, Nerva and Trajan. He ended his career of civil servant becoming Praefectus vigilum. He was a friend of Pliny the Younger, with whom he kept up a correspondence. We are left with a letter addressed by him to Pliny, where he advised his friend to devote himself to history, and with the answer of Pliny. He also wrote about the deaths of famous men, and was a supporter of literates. Moreover, he honored republican heroes by keeping in his house statues of Cato Uticensis, Brutus, and Cassius bearing elogia written by himself.

== Sources ==
- Guy Edward Farquhar Chilver (2012). "Gnaeus Octavius Titinius Capito". The Oxford Classical Dictionary (4 ed.). Oxford: Oxford University Press. ISBN 9780199545568.
- "Elogium (1)". Paulys Realencyclopädie der classischen Altertumswissenschaft (in German). Vol. 5. Leipzig: Georg Wissowa. 1905. pp. 2440–2452.
