= Decrius Calpurnianus =

Decrius Calpurnianus (died Autumn 48 AD) was a Roman Eques of the early Roman imperial period.

Decrius Calpurnianus was praefectus vigilum. He was executed, according to the Roman historian Tacitus, as well as several other distinguished Romans, as a confidant in the adultery committed by the empress Valeria Messalina with the young senator Gaius Silius in AD 48.

== Sources ==
- Arthur Stein: Decrius 2. In: Paulys Realencyclopädie der classischen Altertumswissenschaft (RE). Vol. IV,2, Stuttgart 1901, p. 2306.
