= Classis Misenensis =

Senior fleet of the imperial Roman navy

The Classis Misenensis ("Fleet of Misenum"), later awarded the honorifics praetoria and Pia Vindex, was the senior fleet of the imperial Roman navy.

== History ==
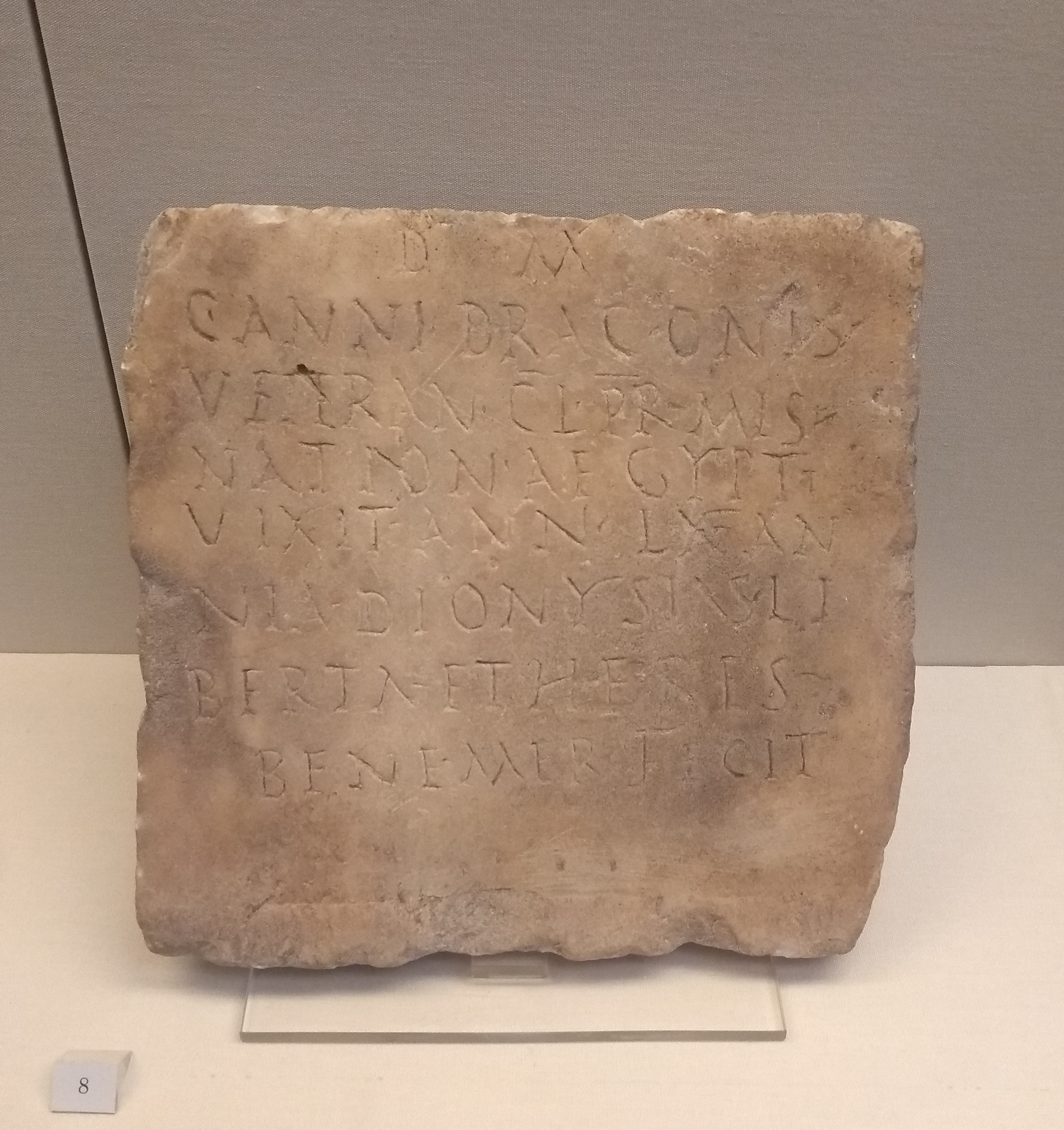
Grave stone from Cape Misenum of the sailor Gaius Annius Draco, who was born in Egypt and served in the classis Misenensis

The Classis Misenensis was founded by Augustus in 27 BC, when the fleet of Italy, until then based mostly at Ostia, was moved to the new harbour of Portus Julius at Misenum in the Bay of Naples. It was commanded by a praefectus classis, drawn from the highest levels of the equestrian class, those earning more than 200,000 sesterces a year. Its mission was to control the western part of the Mediterranean Sea and, as the honorific praetoria awarded by Vespasian for its support during the civil war of 69 suggests, the classis Misenensis, together with the Classis Ravennatis, formed the naval counterpart of the Praetorian Guard, a permanent naval force at the emperor's direct disposal.

The Classis Misenensis recruited its crews mostly from the East, especially from Egypt. Since Rome did not face any naval threat in the Mediterranean, the bulk of the fleet's crews were idle. Some of the sailors were based in Rome itself, initially housed in the barracks of the Praetorian Guard, but later given their own barracks, the Castra Misenatium near the Colosseum. There they were used to stage mock naval battles (naumachiae), and operated the mechanism that deployed the canvas canopy of the Colosseum. Among the sailors of this fleet, Nero levied the legio I Classis and used some of its leading officers in the murder of his mother Agrippina the Younger.

In 192, the Misenum fleet supported Didius Julianus, and then participated in the campaign of Septimius Severus against Pescennius Niger, transporting his legions to the East. The fleet remained active in the East for the next few decades, where the emergence of the Persian Sassanid Empire posed a new threat. In 258–260, the Classis Misenensis was employed in the suppression of a rebellion in North Africa.

In 324 the fleet's ships participated in the campaign of Constantine the Great against Licinius and his decisive naval victory in the Battle of the Hellespont. Afterwards, the bulk of the ships were moved to Constantinople, Constantine's new capital.

== Praefecti classis Misenensis ==
The following list is based on Werner Eck and Hans Lieb, "Ein Diplom für die Classis Ravennas vom 22. November 206", Zeitschrift für Papyrologie und Epigraphik, 96 (1993), pp. 86–88

Name	Time frame	Source
Tiberius Julius Optatus Pontianus	52	CIL XVI, 1 = ILS 1986; CIL X, 6318 = ILS 2815
Anicetus	?-59	Tacitus, Annales, XIV, 3
Claudius Julianus	69	Tacitus, Historiae 3.57
Sextus Lucilius Bassus	69 - 71	CIL XVI, 12; CIL XVI, 13; CIL XVI, 15; CIL XVI, 16; AE 1997, 1273 = RMD-IV 204 Tacitus, Historiae 2.100, 3.12
Claudius Apollinaris	69	Tacitus, Historiae 3.76f
Gaius Plinius Secundus	79	Pliny the Younger, Epistulae, 6.16.4
Quintus Marcius Turbo	114	CIL XVI, 60; AE 1955, 255
Julius Fronto	118-129	CIL XVI, 66; AE 2002, 1734 = RMD-V 353; AE 2008, 1756; AE 2014, 1618; AE 2014, 1619; CIL XVI, 74; AE 2005, 691
Marcus Gavius Maximus	ca. 132/3	
Marcus Calpurnius Seneca Fabius Turpio Sentinatianus	133-134	CIL XVI, 79; CIL II, 1178 = ILS 2736; AE 2005, 1717
Caecius Severus	139-140	CIL XVI, 177; AE 1977, 793 = RMD-I 38
Valerius Paetus	145	CIL XVI, 92; AE 2008, 1111
Titus Furius Victorinus	ca. 154	CIL VI, 41143 = ILS 9002
Tuticanius Capito	158-160	AE 1985, 994 = RMD-III 171; AE 1995, 1822 = RMD-IV 277; AE 1997, 1769 = RMD-V 425; AE 2006, 1855; AE 2006, 1856; AE 2006, 1858
Julius Crescens	166	CIL XVI, 122; AE 1992, 1507 = RMD-III 172
Publius Cominius Clemens	ca. 178	CIL V, 8659 = ILS 1412; AE 1890, 151; RSH-85
Lucius Julius Vehilius Gratus Julianus	ca. 183/4	CIL VI, 31856 = ILS 1327
Gnaeus Marcius Rustius Rufinus	between 190 and 208	CIL IX, 1582 = ILS 1343; CIL X, 1127
Claudius Diognetus	209	AE 1976, 794 = RMD-I 73
Valerius Datus	212	RMD-I 74
Claudius Dionysius	214	AE 1979, 626 = RMD II 131
Marcius Agrippa	217	Historia Augusta, "Vita Caracalla" 6,7
Aelius Secundus	218	AE 1991, 1359 = RMD-III 353
Appius Celer	219-221	AE 1991, 1359 = RMD-III 192; AE 1995, 1565 = RMD-IV 307
Titus Licinius Hierocletes	229	AE 1985, 821 = RMD II 133
Valerius Valens	ca. 238/40	CIL X, 3336 = ILS 3756
Gaius Julius Alexander	246	AE 1910, 36 = ILS 9221
Aelius Aemilianus	247	CIL XVI, 152
Marcus Cornelius Octavianus	ca. 260	CIL VIII, 12296 = ILS 2774; AE 1907, 4 = ILS 9006; AE 1954, 136

== List of known ships ==
The following ship names and types of the classis Misenensis have survived:

- 1 hexeres: Ops
- 1 quinquereme: Victoria
- 9 quadriremes: Fides, Vesta, Venus, Minerva, Dacicus, Fortuna, Annona, Libertas, Olivus
- 50 triremes: Concordia, Spes, Mercurius, Iuno, Neptunus, Asclepius, Hercules, Lucifer, Diana, Apollo, Venus, Perseus, Salus, Athenonix, Satyra, Rhenus, Libertas, Tigris, Oceanus, Cupidus, Victoria, Taurus, Augustus, Minerva, Parthicus, Euphrates, Vesta, Aesculapius, Pietas, Fides, Danubius, Ceres, Tibur, Pollux, Mars, Salvia, Triumphus, Aquila, Liber Pater, Nilus, Caper, Sol, Isis, Providentia, Fortuna, Iuppiter, Virtus, Castor
- 11 liburnians: Aquila, Agathopus, Fides, Aesculapius, Iustitia, Virtus, Taurus Ruber, Nereis, Clementia, Armata, Minerva

By 79 this fleet had probably nothing larger than a quadrireme in service, for Pliny the Elder, commander of the fleet, investigated the eruption of Vesuvius in a quadrireme, presumably his flagship and the largest class of vessel in the fleet.

== See also ==
- Roman navy
- Classiarius

== Sources ==
- Erdkamp, Paul, ed. (2007). A Companion to the Roman Army. Blackwell Publishing Ltd. ISBN 978-1-4051-2153-8.
- Rankov, Boris (1995). "Fleets of the Early Roman Empire, 31 BC–AD 324". In Morrison, John S.; Gardiner, Robert (eds.). The Age of the Galley: Mediterranean Oared Vessels Since Pre-Classical Times. London: Conway Maritime Press. pp. 78–85. ISBN 0-85177-554-3.
