= Titinius (poet) =

Titinius was a Roman dramatist whose productions belonged to the department of the Comoedia Togata. He is commended by Varro on account of the skill with which he developed the characters of the personages whom he brought upon the stage: "Ήθη nulli alii servare convenit quam Titinio et Terentio; πάθη vero Trabea et Attilius et Caecilius facile moverant." It has been inferred from Varro that Titinius was younger than Caecilius but older than Terence, and hence that he must have flourished about 170 BC. The names of upwards of fourteen plays together with a considerable number of short fragments, the language of which bears an antique stamp, have been preserved by the grammarians, especially Nonius Marcellus.

== See also ==
- Theatre of ancient Rome
- Titinia gens
- Titinius (disambiguation)
