= Munatia gens =

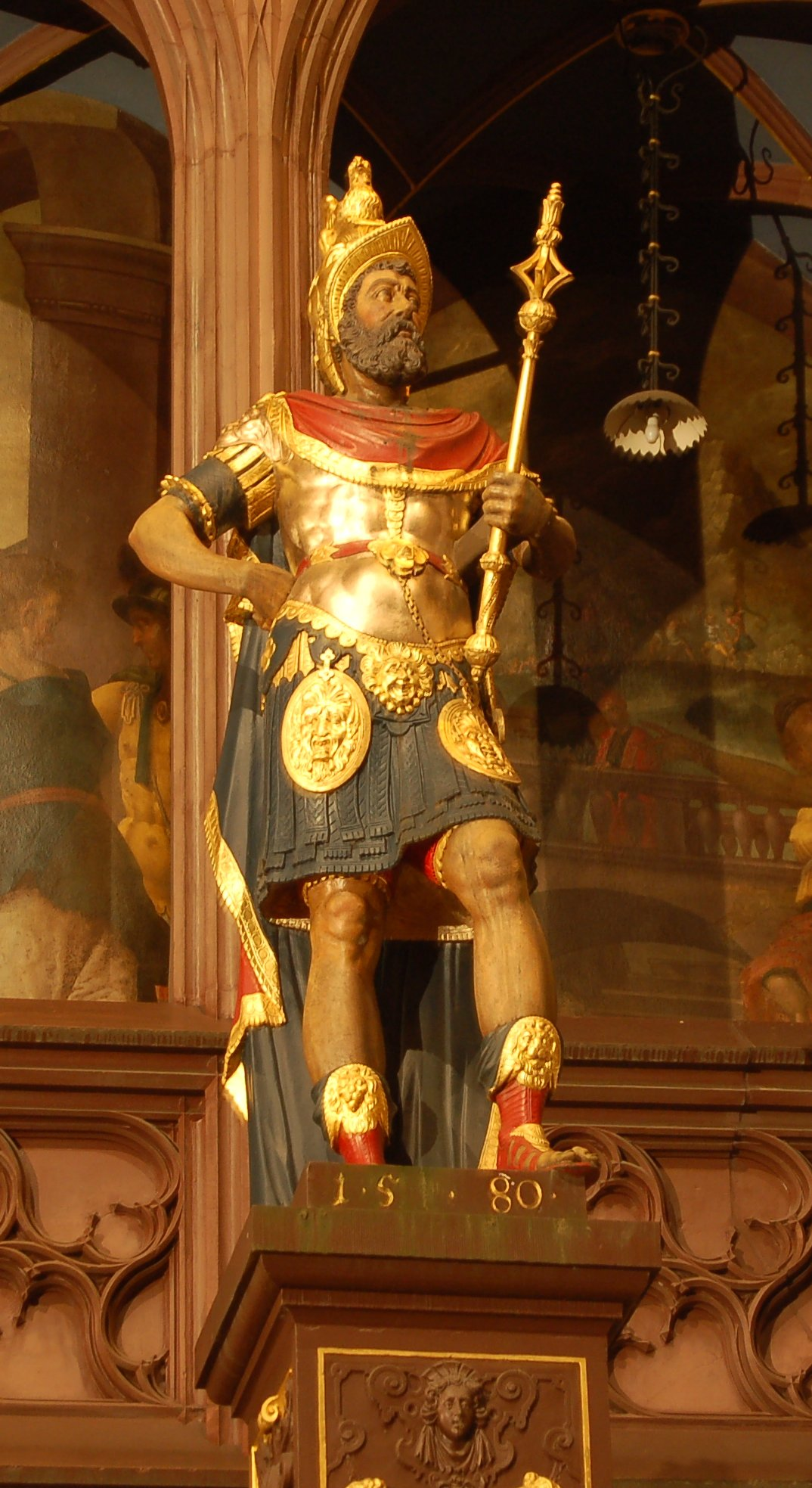
Statue of Lucius Munatius Plancus, in the Rathaus of Basel. Plancus founded the colony of Raurica, now Basel, in 43 BC. The statue, depicting Plancus in the Renaissance version of Roman armor, is dated 1580.

The gens Munatia was a plebeian family at Rome. Members of this gens are first mentioned during the second century BC, but they did not obtain any of the higher offices of the Roman state until imperial times.

== Branches and cognomina ==
The chief surnames of the Munatii under the Republic were Flaccus, Gratus, Plancus, and Rufus. Plancus, often written Plancius, denotes a person with flat feet. It was the cognomen of the most important family of the Munatii. Some of the Munatii do not appear to have borne cognomina.

== Members ==
This list includes abbreviated praenomina. For an explanation of this practice, see filiation.

=== Munatii of the Republic ===
- Gaius Munatius, appointed commissioner in 173 BC, to allot land in Liguria and Cisalpine Gaul.
- Publius Munatius, imprisoned by the triumviri capitales in an uncertain year. Munatius was said to have taken the crown from the statue of Marsyas that stood in the Roman Forum, and placed it on his own head. He appealed his sentence to the tribunes of the plebs, but was ignored.
- Munatius, a man of no consequence, who having squandered his fortune, joined the conspiracy of Catiline.
- Munatius Rufus, a close friend of Cato the Younger, with whom he quarreled. Cato's wife, Marcia, succeeded in bringing about a reconciliation between the men.
- Gaius Munatius C. f., a provincial official to whom Cicero recommended Lucius Livinius Trypho, a freedman.
- Lucius Munatius Flaccus, joined a conspiracy against Quintus Cassius Longinus, praetor in Hispania Ulterior, in 48 BC. Flaccus slew one of the praetor's lictors, and wounded Cassius, but failed to complete his mission.
- Titus Munatius, a relative of Lucius Munatius Plancus, proconsul of Gallia Narbonensis in 44 BC. Munatius received valuable intelligence from his kinsman, which he relayed to Cicero and the Roman Senate. He later joined the party of Marcus Antonius.

=== Munatii Planci ===
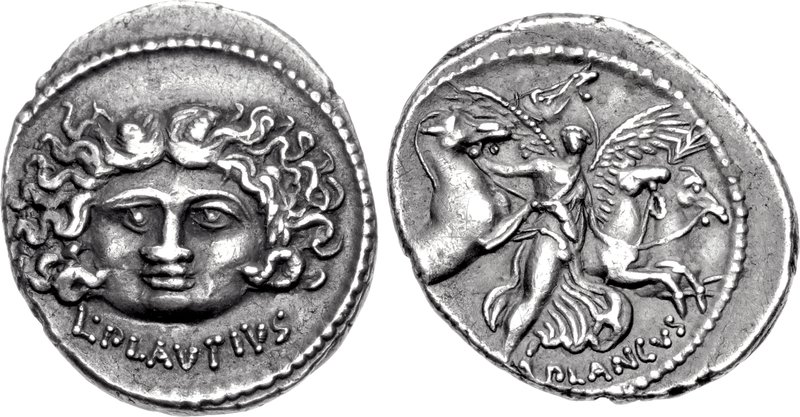
Denarius of Lucius Plautius Plancus, 47 BC. The obverse depicts a facing head of Medusa. The reverse is a reproduction of Nicomachus of Thebes' Victory in a Quadriga, which was placed in the Temple of Jupiter by Lucius Munatius Plancus, consul in 43 BC and Plautius' natural brother.

- Gnaeus Munatius Plancus, was accused by Marcus Junius Brutus about 106 BC, and defended by Lucius Licinius Crassus, the famed orator.
- Lucius Munatius L. f. L. n. Plancus, one of Caesar's most loyal lieutenants, became consul in 42 BC, after the dictator's death. On another occasion he was consul suffectus, but the year is not certain. He befriended Marcus Antonius, then Octavian, proposed the title of Augustus for him in 27 BC, and was Roman censor in 42.
- Titus Munatius L. f. L. n. Plancus Bursa, a partisan of Gnaeus Pompeius Magnus, stoked the unease which led to Pompeius being appointed consul sine collega. He was condemned for joining in the burning of the Curia Hostilia, and went into exile, but later returned. After Caesar's murder, he joined the party of Antonius.
- Gnaeus Munatius L. f. L. n. Plancus, praetor in 43 BC.
- Gaius Munatius L. f. L. n. Plancus, (Note: The Realencyclopädie der Classischen Altertumswissenschaft, followed by Broughton, makes Gaius Munatius Plancus the same as Gnaeus Munatius Plancus, praetor in 43 BC, who would otherwise be his brother. However, this identification is very uncertain, as the only sources that name the praetor call him Gnaeus, while the only sources that name the proscribed Plancus call him Gaius or Lucius.) afterward Lucius Plautius Plancus, was adopted by Lucius Plautius, whose name he assumed. He was proscribed by the Second Triumvirate, and hid near Salernum, but voluntarily gave himself up to save his slaves from being tortured to death to reveal him.
- Munatia L. f. L. n., sister of Lucius, Titus, Gnaeus, and Gaius, married Marcus Titius. He was proscribed by the triumvirs in 43 BC, but escaped to Sicily.
- Munatia (L. f. L. n.) Plancina, probably daughter of the consul Lucius, married Gnaeus Calpurnius Piso, governor of Syria under Tiberius. She and her husband were suspected of poisoning Germanicus, but Plancina was protected by the empress Livia. Accused again in AD 33, she took her own life.
- Lucius Munatius L. f. L. n. Plancus, consul in AD 13. After the death of Augustus, the senate dispatched him to deal with the legions that had revolted against Germanicus, but on his arrival he was nearly slain by the soldiers.

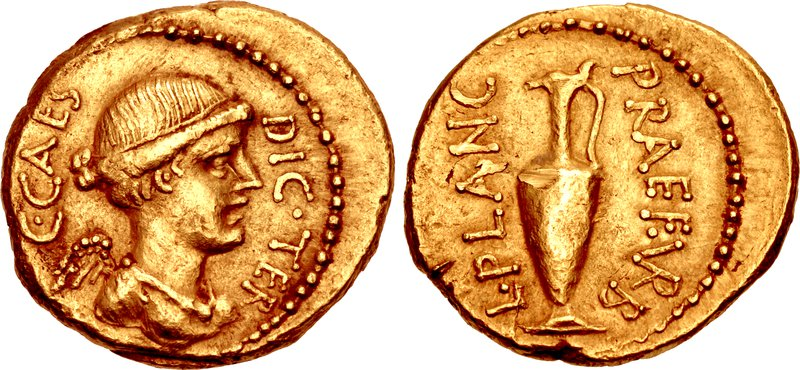
Aureus of Gaius Julius Caesar and Lucius Munatius Plancus, 45 BC. A bust of Victory is depicted on the obverse, while there is a jug on the reverse. The legends tell that Caesar is dictator for the third time, and Plancus has been appointed urban prefect.

=== Munatii of the Empire ===
- Munatius Gratus, a participant in the Pisonian conspiracy of AD 65.
- Lucius Munatius Gallus, legatus pro praetore commanding the army in Africa, AD 100.
- Marcus Munatius Popilianus, the husband of Cocceia Bassula Numisia Procula.
- Munatia M. f. Procula, mentioned in an inscription from Rome.
- Lucius Munatius Felix, governor of Egypt under Antoninus Pius.
- Gnaeus Munatius M. f. Aurelius Bassus, a soldier stationed at Colonia Claudia Victricensis in Britain.
- Gnaeus Munatius Cn. f. Bassus, perhaps the son of Aurelius Bassus.
- Quintus Munatius Celsus, governor of Mauretania Caesariensis under Caracalla.
- Marcus Munatius Sulla Cerialis, consul in AD 215.
- Marcus Munatius Sulla Urbanus, consul in AD 234, with Marcus Claudius Pupienus Maximus, the future emperor.

== See also ==
- List of Roman gentes

== Bibliography ==
- Marcus Tullius Cicero, De Oratore, Epistulae ad Atticum, Epistulae ad Familiares, In Catilinam, Philippicae, Pro Cluentio.
- Gaius Julius Caesar, Commentarii de Bello Gallico (Commentaries on the Gallic War), Commentarii de Bello Civili (Commentaries on the Civil War), De Bello Hispaniensis (On the War in Spain, attributed).
- Aulus Hirtius, De Bello Alexandrino, De Bello Africo (On the African War, attributed).
- Quintus Horatius Flaccus (Horace), Odes.
- Titus Livius (Livy), Ab Urbe Condita (History of Rome).
- Dionysius of Halicarnassus, Romaike Archaiologia.
- Strabo, Geographica.
- Marcus Velleius Paterculus, Compendium of Roman History.
- Valerius Maximus, Factorum ac Dictorum Memorabilium (Memorable Facts and Sayings).
- Lucius Annaeus Seneca (Seneca the Younger), Epistulae Morales ad Lucilium (Moral Letters to Lucilius).
- Quintus Asconius Pedianus, Commentarius in Oratio Ciceronis Pro Milone (Commentary on Cicero's Oration Pro Milone).
- Gaius Plinius Secundus (Pliny the Elder), Historia Naturalis (Natural History).
- Marcus Fabius Quintilianus (Quintilian), Institutio Oratoria (Institutes of Oratory).
- Sextus Julius Frontinus, Strategemata (Stratagems).
- Publius Cornelius Tacitus, Annales.
- Gaius Suetonius Tranquillus, De Vita Caesarum (Lives of the Caesars, or The Twelve Caesars), De Claris Rhetoribus (On the Eminent Orators).
- Plutarchus, Lives of the Noble Greeks and Romans.
- Appianus Alexandrinus (Appian), Bellum Civile (The Civil War).
- Sextus Pompeius Festus, Epitome de M. Verrio Flacco de Verborum Significatu (Epitome of Marcus Verrius Flaccus: On the Meaning of Words).
- Lucius Cassius Dio Cocceianus (Cassius Dio), Roman History.
- Gaius Julius Solinus, De Mirabilis Mundi (On the Wonders of the World).
- Wilhelm Drumann, Geschichte Roms in seinem Übergang von der republikanischen zur monarchischen Verfassung, oder: Pompeius, Caesar, Cicero und ihre Zeitgenossen, Königsberg (1834–1844).
- Dictionary of Greek and Roman Biography and Mythology, William Smith, ed., Little, Brown and Company, Boston (1849).
- Theodor Mommsen et alii, Corpus Inscriptionum Latinarum (The Body of Latin Inscriptions, abbreviated CIL), Berlin-Brandenburgische Akademie der Wissenschaften (1853–present).
- René Cagnat et alii, L'Année épigraphique (The Year in Epigraphy, abbreviated AE), Presses Universitaires de France (1888–present).
- August Pauly, Georg Wissowa, et alii, Realencyclopädie der Classischen Altertumswissenschaft (Scientific Encyclopedia of the Knowledge of Classical Antiquities, abbreviated RE or PW), J. B. Metzler, Stuttgart (1894–1980).
- Paul von Rohden, Elimar Klebs, & Hermann Dessau, Prosopographia Imperii Romani (The Prosopography of the Roman Empire, abbreviated PIR), Berlin (1898).
- T. Robert S. Broughton, The Magistrates of the Roman Republic, American Philological Association (1952).
- Michael Crawford, Roman Republican Coinage, Cambridge University Press (1974, 2001).
