= Julius Antiochus =

Julius Antiochus (3rd century AD - 4th century AD) was a 4th-century Roman official, active during the reign of the emperor Constantine I (r. 306–337). According to laws XV 14.3 (of 6 January 313), I 2.1 (of 30 December 314) and II 10.1+2 (of 1 November 319) of the Codex Theodosianus, he served in this period as praefectus vigilum. According to Ilkka Syvanne, it may be possible to associate him with the general of the same name who served in Armenia under Constantius II (r. 337–361).

== Sources ==
- Martindale, J. R.; Jones, Arnold Hugh Martin; Morris, John (1971). The prosopography of the later Roman Empire - Vol. I AD 260-395. Cambridge & New York: Cambridge University Press.
- Syvanne, Ilkka (2015). Military History of Late Rome 284-361. Barnsley: Pen and Sword. ISBN 1473871840.
