= Marcus Bassaeus Rufus =

2nd century governor of Egypt and praetorian prefect

Marcus Bassaeus Rufus was a Roman senator, who held a number of appointments during the reigns of the emperors Antoninus Pius, Marcus Aurelius and Commodus. The most notable of these were praefectus vigilum, praefectus or governor of Roman Egypt, and praetorian prefect.

Anthony Birley describes Rufus as "a tough soldier who had risen from humble Italian peasant origins". Cassius Dio records two anecdotes that emphasize his humbler beginnings. In one, Rufus had a caller while he was engaged in pruning a vine that grew upon a tree; when Rufus did not climb down at the first summons, the man had rebuked him and said: "Come now, prefect, get down." Dio explains, "That is, he had used this title in speaking to him as to one who was now bearing himself haughtily but had formerly been of lowly station; and it was precisely this title that Fortune subsequently gave him." In the second, Rufus was present when Marcus Aurelius was talking in Latin to someone in Latin, but neither the man addressed nor anyone else nearby, either, understood the emperor; Rufus then exclaimed: "No wonder, Caesar, that he does not know what you said; for he does not understand Greek either." Dio explains that even Rufus was ignorant of what Marcus Aurelius said. Karol Kłodziński notes that not only of "five praetorian prefects of the Antonines, whose full cursus honorum is known, only Marcius Turbo and Bassaeus Rufus achieved the praetorian prefecture without holding equestrian tres militiae", and in addition "both got promotion to ordo equester through the primipilat".

== Public career ==
His career is recorded in an inscription recovered at Rome, but since its publication has been lost. As mentioned, the equestrian career of Bassaeus Rufus began with him being twice primus pilus; this was followed with commission as military tribune of a cohors vigilis, then of an urban cohort, and lastly a praetorian cohort. From here he advanced to civil appointments, beginning with procurator of the imperial properties in the regions of Asturias and Galicia, then became governing procurator of the imperial province of Noricum before the end of the reign of emperor Antoninus Pius. This was followed by the procuratorship of Gallia Belgica and both Germaniae; the duties of this official included supervising the distribution of funds for the armies on the Rhine. Rufus must have distinguished himself in this appointment, for he advanced to procurator a rationibus, or overseer of the imperial secretariat in Rome.

Rufus was later promoted to praefectus vigilum at some point before 10 March 168, according to an inscription with that date. Between that date and 10 July of that year, he was promoted to prefect of Egypt. However Marcus Aurelius found he was needed in a more important position, and at some point before the death of Lucius Verus in early 169, Bassaeus Rufus was promoted to Praetorian Prefect. Shortly afterwards he was given a colleague as praetorian prefect, Marcus Macrinius Vindex.

Both were selected to help with the threat posed by the Marcomanni on the Danube frontier; the previous praetorian prefect, Titus Furius Victorinus, had been killed the year before in battle with these Germanic invaders. Nevertheless, their responsibilities included more than military matters. An inscription recovered from Saepinum (modern Sepino) records the response of Rufus and Vindex to a petition from the imperial freedman Cosmus concerning the management of the imperial flocks. Rufus is recorded as present in another case, this one heard by the emperor Marcus Aurelius, which involved his former tutor Herodes Atticus: Herodes had accused three rivals from Athens of conspiracy, and these three men appealed to Marcus at his headquarters at Sirmium. Herodes, who had shortly before the meeting lost two young slave girls when they were killed by lightning, failed to present his case properly, instead attacking him for "sacrificing me to the whim of a woman and a three-year-old child!" Rufus, who watched all this, believed only one conclusion was possible: Herodes wanted to die.

Under the two prefects Rufus and Vindex, victories followed for the Romans. Although Vindex met with death in 172, Rufus distinguished himself: the lost Roman inscription states he received dona militaria appropriate to his rank. Rufus is known to have accompanied Marcus Aurelius to the front in July 175, after which the emperor awarded him a further distinction: consularia ornamenta. This is the equivalent of the consulship for non-Senators, and was commonly granted to praetorian prefects who had a successful tenure. Rufus received this during the triumph Marcus Aurelius celebrated on his return to Rome 23 December 176. Bassaeus Rufus retired from public life not long after this.

Political offices
Preceded by Quintus Baienus Blassianus	Prefectus of Aegyptus; 168-169	Succeeded by Gaius Calvisius Statianus
