= Plotius Firmus =

Roman knight and senator (fl. 1st century AD)

Plotius Firmus (fl. 1st century AD) was a Roman knight and senator who flourished in the sixties of the first century AD. He started his career in the army as a simple soldier, and in 69 AD, during the reign of Galba he was praefectus vigilum in Rome, helping Otho to oust the emperor. After Galba's seizure of power, he was acclaimed by the soldiers praefectus praetorio, and remained quite popular with the military. After Otho's defeat at Bedriacum he encouraged the depressed Emperor who wanted to quit his power to persevere. Despite that, Otho killed himself, and Plotius found him in his chamber lying in his blood.After the suicide of his patron, Plotius tried to rapproach himself with Vitellius, but was prevented to do that by his soldiers. It cannot be excluded that he managed to be pardoned later, but after the end of the 69 AD crisis there are two possible hypotheses: he could either have been the adoptive father or father of C. Tullius Capito Pomponianus Plotius Firmus, or under Vespasian he could have been adopted by the senator Gaius Tullius Capito Pomponianus, taking himself the name Gaius Tullius Capito Pomponianus Plotius Firmus. Thereby he gained entry into the ordo senatorius, and was immediately sent to the military district of Numidia as legate of the Legio III Augusta.

In 84, he was appointed consul suffectus for the nundinum from September to October 84.

== Sources ==
- Justinus Klass: Plotius 2. In: Paulys Realencyclopädie der classischen Altertumswissenschaft (RE). Vol. XXI,1, Stuttgart 1951, p. 592–593
- Paul Gallivan, "The Fasti for A. D. 70–96", Classical Quarterly, 31, 1981, pp. 190, 197, 216.
