= Classis Ravennas =

Roman fleet based at Ravenna

The Classis Ravennas ("Fleet of Ravenna"), later awarded the honorifics praetoria and Pia Vindex, was the second most senior fleet of the imperial Roman Navy after the Classis Misenensis.

== History ==
Ravenna had been used for ship construction and as a naval port at least since the Roman civil wars, but the permanent classis Ravennas was established by Caesar Augustus in 27 BC . It was commanded by a praefectus classis, drawn from the highest ranks of the equestrian class, those with a net worth more than 200,000 sesterces, and its mission was to control the Adriatic Sea and perhaps the eastern part of the Mediterranean Sea. As the honorific praetoria, awarded by Vespasian for its support during the civil war of AD 69, suggests, together with the classis Misenensis, it formed the naval counterpart of the Praetorian Guard, a permanent naval force at the emperor's direct disposal.

Its home port of Classis (modern Classe), which was named after the fleet, was built under Augustus, and included a canal, the Fossa Augusta, which united the port with the lagoons of the interior, as well as with the river Po to the north. Naval arsenals and docks stretched along the Fossa, in a complex that reached 22 km (14 mi) in length. According to a passage by Cassius Dio, related by Jordanes, the harbour could accommodate 250 ships.

The classis Ravennas recruited its crews mostly from the East, especially from Egypt. Since Rome did not face any naval threat in the Mediterranean, the bulk of the fleet's crews was idle. Some of the sailors were based in Rome itself, initially housed in the barracks of the Praetorian Guard, but later given their own barracks, the Castra Ravennatium across the Tiber. There they were used to stage mock naval battles (naumachiae), and operated the mechanism that deployed the canvas canopy of the Colosseum. In 70, Emperor Vespasian also levied the legio II Adiutrix from the marines of classis Ravennas.

In the civil war of 192-193, the fleet supported Septimius Severus, and, together with the classes Misenensis, it participated in the campaign against Pescennius Niger, transporting his legions to the East. The fleet remained active in the East for the next few decades, where the emergence of the Persian Sassanid Empire posed a new threat that required frequent reinforcements to be ferried.

In 324 the fleet's ships participated in the campaign of Constantine the Great against Licinius and his decisive naval victory in the Battle of the Hellespont. Afterwards, the bulk of the ships were moved to Constantinople, where emperor Constantine had moved the capital of the Roman Empire.

== praefecti classis Ravennatis ==
The following list is based on Werner Eck and Hans Lieb, "Ein Diplom für die Classis Ravennas vom 22. November 206", Zeitschrift für Papyrologie und Epigraphik, 96 (1993), pp. 85f

Name	Time frame	Source
Publius Palpellius Clodius Quirinalis	AD 56	CIL V, 533 = ILS 2702; Tacitus, Annales 13.30
Marcus Aurelius Regulus	reign of Nero	CIL VI, 3150
Lucius Aemilius Sullectinus	reign of Nero	CIL XIII, 1770 = RMD-V 449
Sextus Lucilius Bassus	69 (and 71?)	CIL XVI, 14 = ILS 1991; Tacitus, Historiae 2.100
Cornelius Fuscus	69	Tacitus, Historiae 3.12
Lucius Cornelius Gratus	100	AE 1989, 315 = RMD-III 142
Marcus Ulpius Marcellus	119	AE 2012, 1958
Lucius Numerius Albanus	127	CIL XVI, 72
Marcus Gavius Maximus	ca. 131/2	
Marcus Calpurnius Seneca Fabius Turpio Sentinatianus	before 134	CIL II, 1178 = ILS 2736; CIL II, 1267
Fabius Sabinus	139	AE 2007, 1786
Valerius Paetus	c. 142	AE 1995, 1824 = RMD-IV 264; AE 2004, 1921 = RMD-V 392
? Marcus Sempronius Liberalis	143/144	ZPE-207-232
Titus Furius Victorinus	ca. 150	CIL VI, 31856 = ILS 9002
Tuticanius Capito	152	CIL XVI, 100
Quintus Baienus Blassianus	ca. 160	CIL XIV, 5341
Publius Cominius Clemens	ca. 175	CIL V, 175 = ILS 1412; RSH-85
Lucius Julius Vehilius Gratus Julianus	ca. 184/5	CIL VI, 31856 = ILS 1327
Gnaeus Marcius Rustius Rufinus	between 190 and 210	CIL X, 1127
Marcus Aquilius Felix	between 190 and 210	CIL X, 6657 = ILS 1387; AE 1945, 80
Aemilius Sulleptinus	202	AE 2001, 2161 = RMD-V 449
Claudius Diognetus	206-209	AE 1993, 1789 = RMD-III 189; AE 1976, 794 = RMD-I 73
Marcus Gongius Nestorianus	213/217	CIL XVI, 138
Aurelius Elpidephorus	221	AE 2012, 1946
Valerius Oclatius	225	AE 1999, 1363 = RMD-IV 311
J[u]lius [---]ucianus	249	CIL XVI, 154
Vibius Seneca	after 250	AE 1968, 189; cf. I. Eph. 3.737
Voltinius Saloninus	3rd C.	AE 1979, 290

== List of known ships ==
The following ship names and types of the classis Ravennas have survived:

- 2 quinqueremes: Augustus, Victoria.
- 6 quadriremes: Fortuna, Mercurius, Neptunus, Padus, Vesta, Victoria.
- 28 triremes: Aesculapius, Apollo, Aquila, Archinix, Ariadna, Augustus, Castor, Concordia, Costantia, Danae, Danubius, Diana, Felicitas, Hercules, Mars, Mercurius, Minerva, Neptunus, Nereis, Pax, Pietas, Pinnata, Providentia, Silvanus, Triumphus, Venus, Virtus, Victoria.
- 5 liburnians: Ammon, Diana, Pinnata, Satyra, Varvarina.
- 5 other vessels: Clementia, Danubius, Hercules, Mercurius, Victoria.

== See also ==
- Roman navy
- Classiarius

== Sources ==
- Erdkamp, Paul, ed. (2007). A Companion to the Roman Army. Blackwell Publishing Ltd. ISBN 978-1-4051-2153-8.
- Rankov, Boris (1995). "Fleets of the Early Roman Empire, 31 BC–AD 324". In Morrison, John S.; Gardiner, Robert (eds.). The Age of the Galley: Mediterranean Oared Vessels Since Pre-Classical Times. London: Conway Maritime Press. pp. 78–85. ISBN 0-85177-554-3.
