= Ab epistulis =

Chancellor's office in the Roman Empire

Ab epistulis was the chancellor's office in the Roman Empire with responsibility for the emperor's correspondence. The office sent mandata (instructions) to provincial governors and other officials.

Ab epistulis wrote in Latin (ab epistulis latinis) and in Greek (ab epistulis graecis), and composed the short responses to petitions on behalf of the emperor. Holders of the position usually had a particular vocation for literary matters.

== Notable ab epistulis ==
Augustus punished his secretary Thallus "for divulging the contents of a letter". Caligula dictated a letter to an ab epistulis. Narcissus apparently worked as ab epistulis, because he was in charge of the grammata of Claudius against Agrippina. Beryllus was the ab epistulis graecis of Nero. The famous biographer Suetonius Tranquillus was ab epistulis to Hadrian, according to the Historia Augusta until he was replaced for too-close relations with Empress Sabina.

One of the leading rhetoricians of this time, Alexander Peloplaton, was Marcus Aurelius's ab epistulis in the 170s. Marcus was impressed by the orator Hadrian of Tyre, so he offered him the job ab epistulis to recognise his excellence. Aspasius of Ravenna was a Greek orator, who between AD 211 and 216 served as ab epistulis. Aelius Antipater was the ab epistulis of the emperor Caracalla, who defined him "my friend and teacher, entrusted with the composition of Greek letters". Marcius Agrippa was a cognitionibus and ab epistulis of Caracalla.

== Bibliography ==
- Millar, Fergus (2005). Rome, the Greek World, and the East: Government, Society, and Culture in the Roman Empire. Vol. 2. Univ of North Carolina Press. p. 504. ISBN 9780807863695.
