= Praefectus vigilum =

Chief of watchmen of ancient Rome

The praefectus vigilum (lit. 'prefect of the watchmen', pl.: praefecti vigilum) was, starting with the reign of the Emperor Augustus, the commander of the city guards in Rome (cohortes vigilum or vigiles), who were responsible for maintaining peace and order at night--a kind of fire and security police. Although less important than the other prefects, the office was considered a first step in order to reach an important position in the imperial administration.

== Description ==
=== Headquarters ===
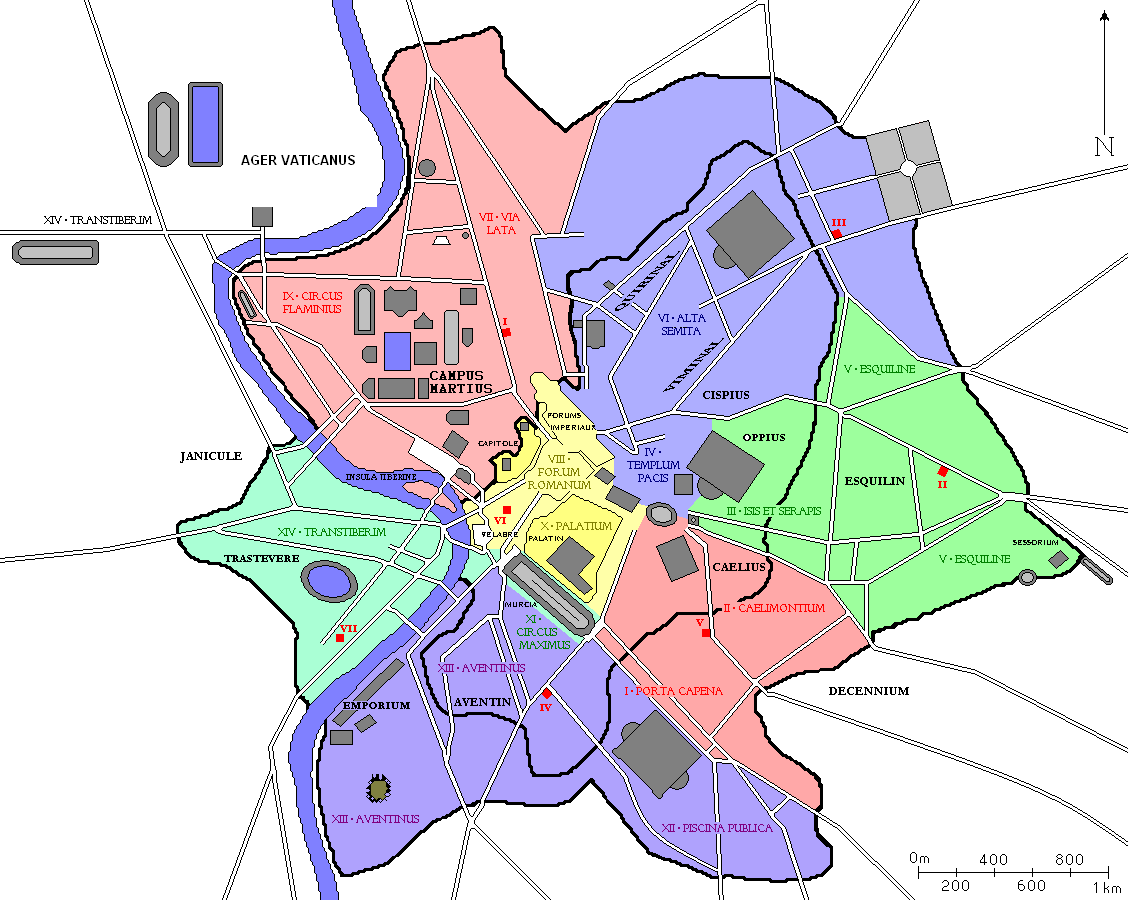
Plan of imperial Rome with the seven districts controlled by the cohorts and the position of each cohort

The offices of the praefectus vigilum were located in the Campus Martius, perhaps in the quadriportico of the theatre of Balbus (along the via Lata), inside the barracks of the First Cohort of Vigiles (Latin: statio primae cohortis vigilum). The reason to think that is that all the dedications found in the remains of these barracks are inscribed in the name of the prefect. It was in this building that the praefectus vigilum had his offices and his courtroom and it was from there that he left every night to carry out the statutory rounds.

=== Powers and duties ===
Without the participation of the Senate or the Roman people, the praefectus vigilum was appointed by the Emperor for an indefinite period and just as arbitrarily removed again. He supervised the fire prevention and fire fighting service in the city of Rome. He was also responsible for maintaining order in the streets at night. The Prefect was vested with both military (he was the head of the corps) and civil (judicial) powers, the latter giving him jurisdiction over arsonists, burglars, thieves, robbers and fences. He could impose light sentences (lashes or sticks) but important cases were transferred to the responsibility of the prefect of the city (praefectus urbi). His staff therefore consisted of two types of personnel, the first military (officers and non-commissioned officers) and the second civilian (regular administrative staff). Each night, the prefect must personally lead one of the surveillance rounds and circulate in the town throughout the night. He had the right to search private homes to check whether fire safety standards were being respected. The praefectus vigilum was assisted by a subpraefectus and tribuni, who on their part were backed by civil servants. From the end of the fourth century onwards, the organisation of the Corps was modified. The prefect of the watchmen was placed under the orders of the prefect of the city, of whom he became one of the heads of department.

=== Prestige of the function ===
The Prefect of Vigils was not a magistrate, but a member of the equestrian order and an imperial commissioner (prefect) appointed by the emperor. Later this position was also filled by senators. His position was considered inferior to the other prefectures of Rome, like the praefectus urbi, annonae and praetorio, which were considered more prestigious. It was considered a first step for knights seeking to climb the ladder of public offices.

== The subprefectus vigilum ==
=== In Rome ===
From the 2nd century onwards, under the reign of Trajan, the prefect had more and more legal powers and the presence of a sub-prefect became necessary. One of the first sub-prefects was Gaius Maesius Tertius, appointed in 113. The sub-prefect of the vigiles had his own offices, similar to those of his chief of service, but with a smaller staff. When necessary, he replaced the prefect. The position of sub-prefect represented one of the centenarii of the career of the procurator (procurator centenarius was the governor of a part of a province). The position was accessible through the regular career but primipili could also access it directly. According to Hans-Georg Pflaum, a subpraefectus vigilum got a wage of 100,000 sestertii.

=== In Ostia ===
Under Claudius, a corps of vigiles was detached from the garrison of Rome and stationed in the port of Ostia. This detachment was temporarily placed under the orders of a sub-prefect during the 3rd century, who was himself under the orders of the prefect of the Vigiles of Rome. There would then have been two sub-prefects of the vigiles, one in Rome and the other in Ostia.

== History ==
=== Republican Age ===
During the Republic, the firefighting service was limited to groups of slaves made available by wealthy individuals, such as one set up by Marcus Licinius Crassus and one set up by Marcus Egnatius Rufus while aedile in 21 BC. Their number, less than 600 "firemen", remained very insufficient in the face of the risk of fire which increased with the accelerated urbanisation of the city from the end of the Republic.

=== Creation of the vigiles urbani ===
The night watches were reorganised by Augustus in 6 AD because of the frequent fires in the city, which were especially dangerous at night. He created a larger and better (militarily) organised corps, the vigiles urbani. They were led by the praefectus vigilum and divided into seven cohorts (of 560 or 1,000 men each), each covering two of the fourteen city districts (regiones), and each led by a tribunus. The vigiles were mainly recruited among the freedmen, and therefore enjoyed a lower standing than the regular army, but the corps was also open to citizens of the provinces of the Empire and later to Roman citizens.

The troops received accommodation in the city and, although initially paid from the state treasury, the large sums needed soon forced the emperor to demand new taxes or increase existing taxes dedicated to financing the corps.

The vigiles were distributed throughout all quarters of the city, kept watch at night and ensured that fires were quickly detected and extinguished. As fire guards, they were equipped with rope ladders, fire hooks and other extinguishing equipment and trained to climb from wall to wall.

=== The praefectus vigilum under the Julio-Claudian dynasty ===
The first known praefectus vigilum dates back to the middle reign of Emperor Tiberius, and during the period of existence of the cohortes vigilum (about three centuries) only 43 prefects are known. Among these, only seven are mentioned by historians, and all for reasons unrelated to their duty. As the commander of a significant force directly available in Rome, the praefectus vigilum became important as early as during the reign of Emperor Tiberius, where his confidant Lucius Aelius Seianus, when he lost favour with the emperor, was arrested by officials of this office. Under Emperor Claudius, the praefectus vigilum was executed in 48 for being involved in an attempted coup.

==== Neronian Fire ====
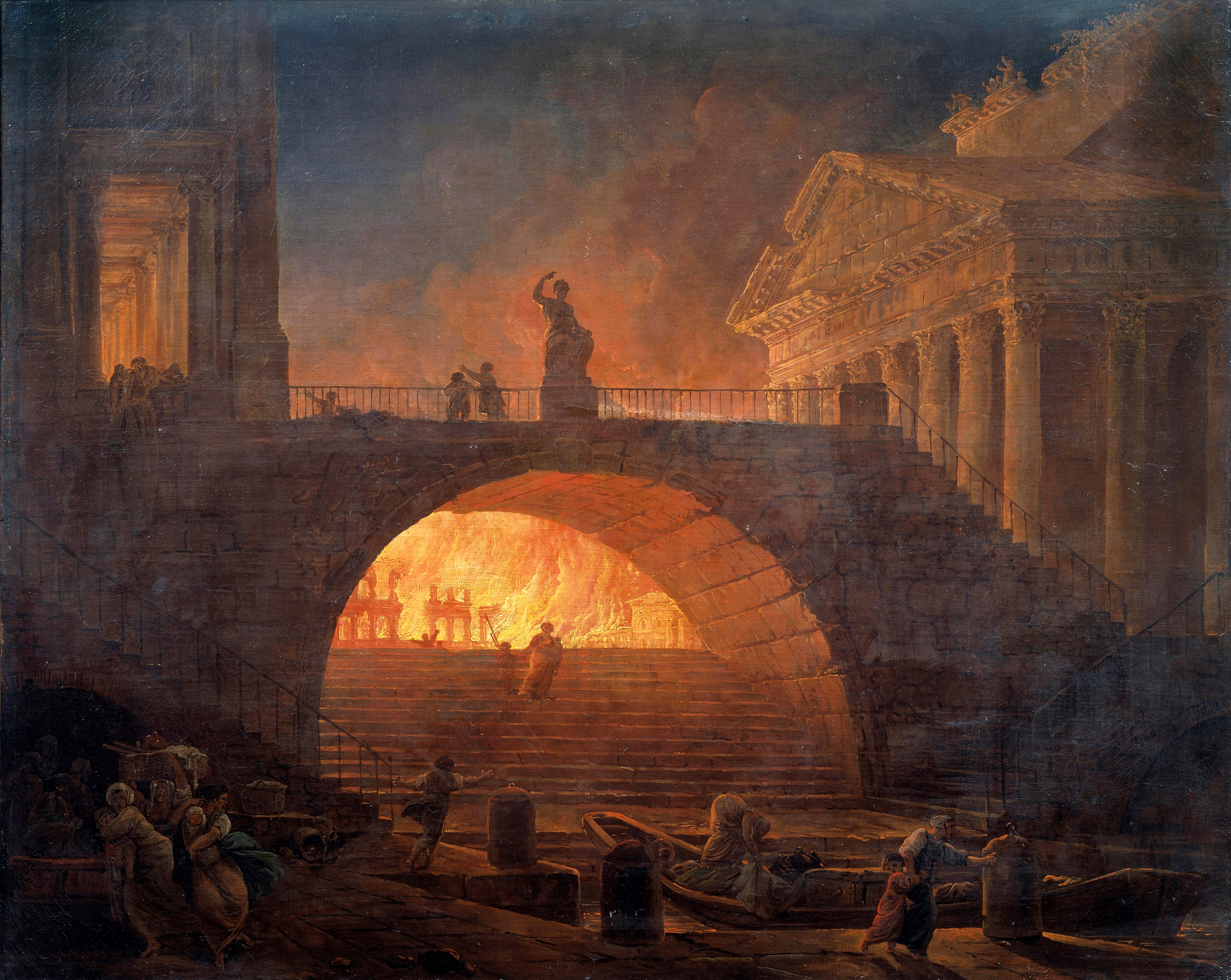
The Fire of Rome by Hubert Robert

It is noteworthy that no ancient author mentions the praefectus vigilum who was in office during the great Neronian fire of 64. Until two years earlier, the office had been held by Ofonius Tigellinus, who had been appointed praefectus praetorio. It is therefore possible that at the time of the fire the office was vacant or that the person in charge (probably Plotius Firmus) was still inexperienced. Moreover, Tigellinus would certainly have brought with him the best of his collaborators among the fire brigade after his promotion, depriving the new praefectus of valuable assistants. This could explain why Tigellinus took command of the operations against the fire, using also the Praetorian Guards, and managed to bring it under control after six days. When the fire broke out again, he was reduced to the extreme measure of demolishing the buildings that had not yet been touched by the flames (including his possessions) in a last-ditch attempt to stop the fire.

=== After the 2nd century ===
The office existed under later emperors, but it was not a permanent one. Starting under Gordianus III (r. 238–244), the vigiles could receive further duties in the military: the Praefectus Vigilum could accomplish such duties in the provinces after being appointed dux. This has been recorded for the first time in 241–242 and is known from a letter written in 248–249 by Philip the Arab and his homonymous son and co-ruler, dispatched to the Praefectus Vigilum.

The office also existed in Constantinople in the later imperial period.

== Known praefecti vigilum ==
This is a list of the known praefecti vigilum. (Note: The vast majority of the periods or years in which they were in office came from Sablayrolles (1996), Appendix 1.) Only 43 prefects were known as of 1992. The main reason for this is that the fasti with regard to this office are largely incomplete. Consequently, identification is possible mainly through epigraphic findings and secondary through classical sources.

=== Julio-Claudian dynasty (2 BC – AD 68) ===
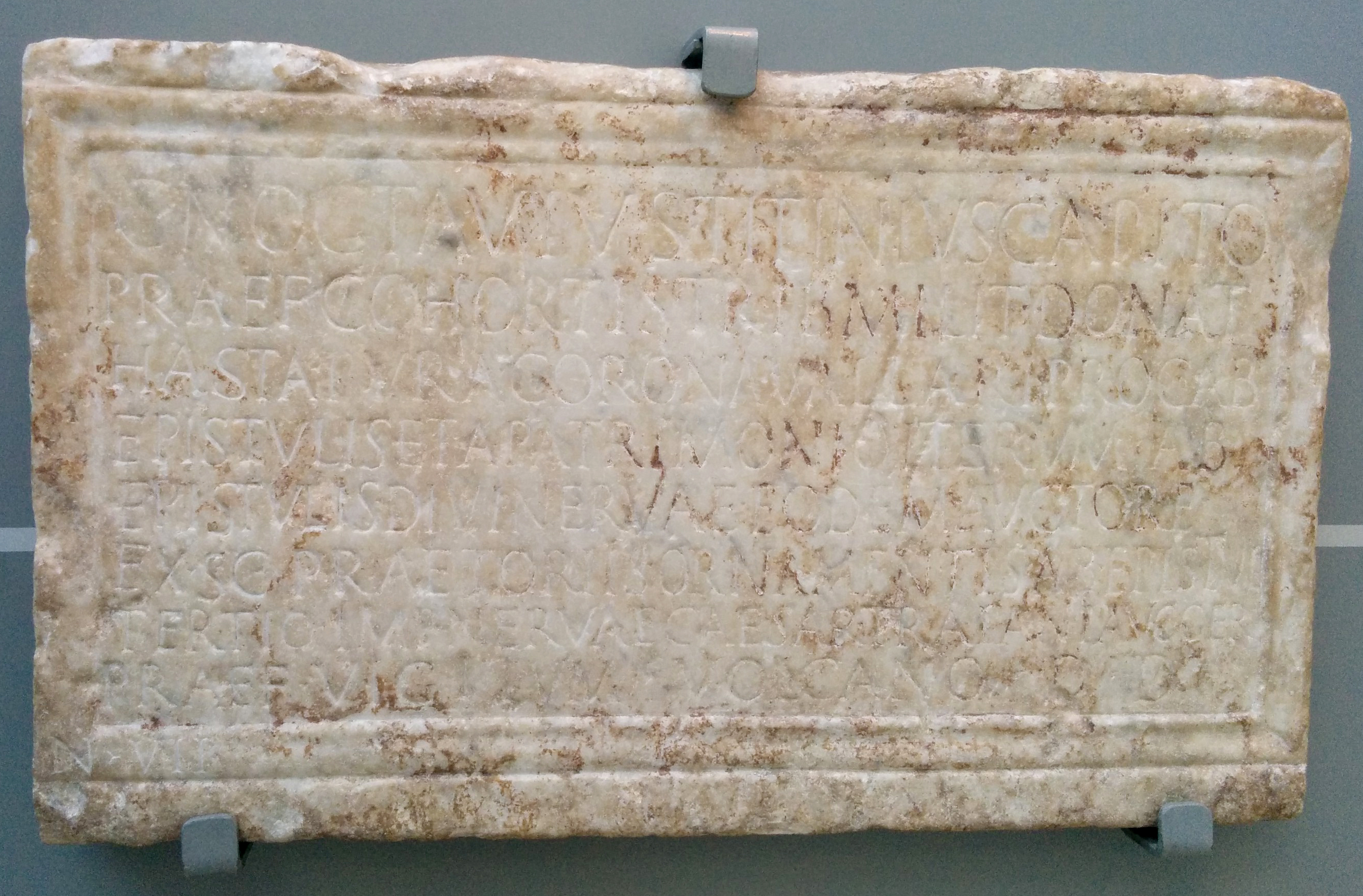
Roman Inscription showing the cursus honorum of Gnaeus Octavius Titinius Capito, praefectus vigilum under Trajan

- Before 31: Naevius Sutorius Macro
- 31: Publius Graecinius Laco
- ? – 48: Decrius Calpurnianus
- 48 – 51: Julius Pelignus
- Before 44: Cornelius Laco
- ? – 54: Laelianus
- [55 – 60]: Annaeus Serenus.
- 60? – 62: Gaius Ofonius Tigellinus

=== Year of the Four Emperors (AD 68 – 69) ===
- ? – 69: Plotius Firmus

=== Flavian dynasty (AD 69 – 96) ===
- [69 – 79]: Gaius Tettius Cassianus Priscus
- [71 – 130]: Sextus Sammius Voltina
- 92: Sextus Procilius Papirianus (dubious)

=== Five Good Emperors to Didius Julianus (AD 96 – 193) ===
- Before 102 – ?: Gnaeus Octavius Titinius Capito
- At least 111 – 113: Quintus Rammius Martialis
- [117 – 138]: Titus Haterius Nepo (attributed)
- 149: [Con?]cors
- At least 156-158: Gaius Tattius Maximus
- ? – 158: Titus Furius Victorinus
- [161 – 166]: Umbricius Aemilianus
- 166 – 168 circa: Marcus Bassaeus Rufus
- 175 (attested): Quintus Cervidius Scaevola
- 178 – 180: Tiberius Claudius Vibianus Tertullus
- 181 (attested): Sempronius Laetus
- 190 (attested): Aelius Julianus
- 191 (attested): Marcus Clodius Catullus

=== Severan dynasty (AD 193 – 235) ===
- 193 – 196: Gaius Fulvius Plautianus
- [197 – 202?]: Titus Flavius Pomptina Magnus
- 203 – 205: Junius Rufinus
- March 205 – 208: Gnaeus Marcius Rustius Rufinus
- 208 – 211: Gaius Julius Quintilianus
- 212 (attested): Quintus Cerellius Apollinaris
- Summer 213 (attested): Lucius Valerius Datus
- 215 – 217: Quintus Marcius Dioga
- 217 (attested): Valerius Titanianus
- 218? – 222: Gordius
- 222 – ?: Gaius Julius Paternus
- 226 (attested): Aelius Florianus

=== Crisis of the Third Century (AD 235 – 285) ===
- [235 – 238]: Herennius Modestinus
- 239 – 242: Gnaeus Domitius Philippus
- 242 – 243: Valerius Valens
- 244 (attested): Faltonius Restitutianus.
- 259 (attested): Lucius Petronius Taurus Volusianus
- 269 (attested): Julius Placidianus

=== Tetrarchy to Constantine I (AD 285 – 324) ===
- 314? – 326: Julius Antiochus
- Shortly before 330?: Av... Maximilianus

=== Late Empire (AD 324 – 476) ===
- [324 – 337]: Postumius Isidorus
- [333 – 337]: Rupilius Pisonianus
- [367 – 375]: Flavius Maximus
- [375 – 400]: Publius Aelius Apollinaris

=== Uncertain Years ===
- P. Cassius ...
- 2nd Century: Anonymous
- 3rd Century, between Severan dynasty and Tetrarchy: Aur(elius) Concord[ius]
- [...]mo

== Sources ==
- Wilhelm Adolf Becker; Joachim Marquardt (1849). Handbuch der römischen Alterthümer (in German). Vol. II.3. Leipzig.
- William Smith (Ed.): Dictionary of Greek and Roman Antiquities. Boston, 2. Ed. 1859. Sub voce„Exercitus, Cohortes Vigilum“. p. 510.
- Hans-Georg Pflaum: Les carrières procuratoriennes équestres sous le Haut-Empire Romain, Paris 1960, Vol. 1
- Roy E. Hollady (1962). "The Vigiles of ancient Rome". Michigan State university.
- Homo, Léon (1971). Rome impériale et l'urbanisme dans l'Antiquité. L'évolution de l'humanité (in French). Albin Michel.
- Robert Sablayrolles (1996). "Libertinus miles. Les cohortes de vigiles". Publications de l'École Française de Rome. 224 (in French). 224 (1). Rome.
- Miriam T. Griffin: Seneca. A Philosopher in Politics. Clarendon Paperbacks, 1992. Appendix: Annaeus Serenus as Prefect of the Watch. ISBN 0-19-814774-0.
- Miriam T. Griffin (2000). Nero. The End of a Dynasty. Routledge. ISBN 978-0415214643.
- Vogler, Chantal (2007). François Vion-Delphin; François Lassus (eds.). "La lutte contre les incendies dans la Rome impériale". Les hommes et le feu de l'antiquité à nos jours (in French). Presses Universitaires de Franche-Comté: 199–211.
- Salles, Catherine (2010). "Les pompiers de Rome". L'Archéologue. february/march (in French). 106. Archéologie nouvelle: 60–62.
- Lefebvre, Sabine (2011). L'administration de l'empire romain d'Auguste à Dioclétien (in French). Armand Colin.
