= Praefectus annonae =

Manager of the grain supply to Roman cities

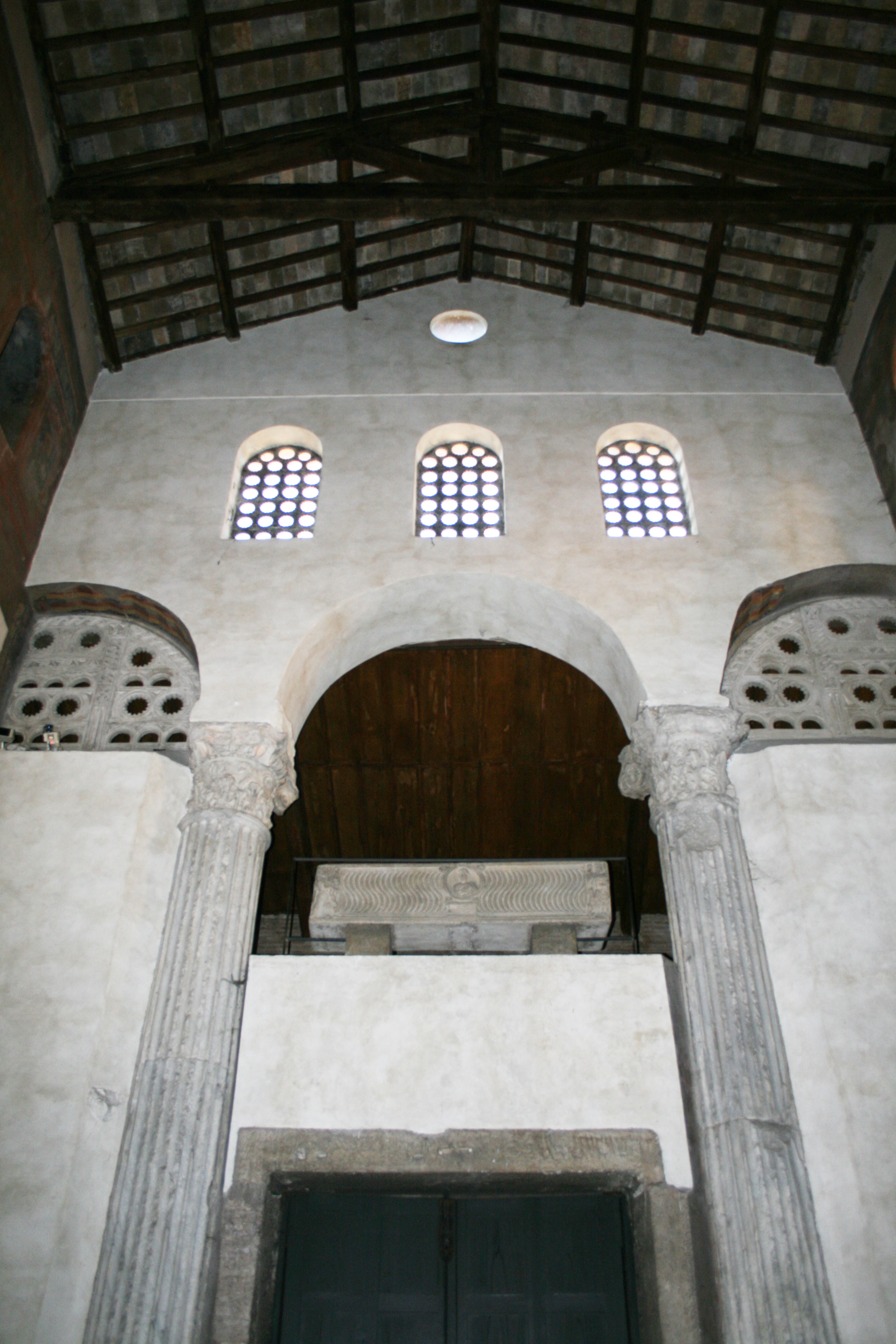
The columns of the statio annonae are now part of the church of Santa Maria in Cosmedin, Rome. Another statio was located near the Crypta Balbi.

The praefectus annonae ("prefect of the provisions"), also called the praefectus rei frumentariae ("prefect of the grain supply"), was a Roman official charged with the supervision of the grain supply to the city of Rome. Under the Republic, the job was usually done by an aedile. However, in emergencies, or in times of extraordinary scarcity, someone would be elected to the office, and would take charge of supplying the entire city with provisions.

Lucius Minucius Augurinus, the accuser of Spurius Maelius, was the first individual appointed to this office, serving from 439 BC. During the early 60s BC, following the sacking of the port of Ostia by pirates, Pompey held the powers of the office. Around 7 BC, the first Roman Emperor, Augustus, followed this example, and after vesting himself with these powers, specified that two former praetors should be appointed each year to carry out the functions of this office. Augustus transferred powers from the aediles to this office, and specified that all holders of the office be members of the Equestrian order. Augustus also specified that these officers were to be aided by an adjutor (from the second century termed a subpraefectus). Later, Augustus specified that the praefecti should be of consular rank. After Augustus' reign, one person would usually hold this office, frequently for a span of several years. This continued until the fall of the Roman Empire.

During the later Empire, further praefecti annonae were established for the city of Alexandria (Egypt) and the province of Africa, the two chief sources of grain for the provisioning of Rome.

== List of known praefecti annonae urbis Romae ==
The entries from AD 14 to 337 are based on Henriette Pavis d'Escurac, La préfecture de l'annone, service administratif impérial d'Auguste à Constantin.

- Gaius Turranius (AD 14–48)
- Pompeius Paulinus (c. 49–54)
- Faenius Rufus (55–62)
- Gaius Poppaeus Sabinianus (c. 62–65)
- Arrius Varus (70)
- Gaius Valerius Paulinus (c. 71–73)
- Lucius Julius Ursus (c. 74–76)
- Gaius Tettius Cassianus Priscus (?76–79/80)
- Lucius Laberius Maximus (c. 80–82)
- Marcus Mettius Rufus (before 88)
- Claudius Athenodorus (c. 95)
- Gaius Minicius Italus (between 95 and 100)
- Servius Sulpicius Similis (between 103 and 107)
- Marcus Rutilius Lupus (between 107 and 111)
- Claudius Julianus (between 118 and 138) (Note: Addressee of a rescript of Hadrian; otherwise unknown.)
- Gaius Junius Flavianus (c. 138)
- Lucius Valerius Proculus (142–144)
- Marcus Petronius Honoratus (between 144 and 147)
- Tiberius Claudius Secundinus Lucius Statius Macedo (after 147)
- Lucius Volusius Maecianus (150s)
- Quintus Baienus Blassianus (between 150 and 161) (Note: Dating Blassianus here instead of c. 133, following Bastianini, "Lista dei prefetti d'Egitto dal 30^{a} al 299^{p}", p. 297, No. 1.)
- Titus Furius Victorinus (before 159)
- Titus Flavius Titianus (between 161 and 164)
- Ulpius Saturninus (166?)
- Titus Flavius Piso (c. 177)
- Lucius Julius Vehilius Gratus Julianus (until 189)
- Papirius Dionysius (189–190)
- Claudius Julianus (c. 201)
- Quintus Marcius Dioga (between 211 and 217)
- Claudius (c. 218)
- Domitius Ulpianus (31 March 222 - 1 December 222)
- Gaius Attius Alcimus Felicianus (2nd quarter 3rd century)
- Caecina Largus (1 February 250)
- Flavius Arabianus (between 270 and 275)
- Hostilius Antipater (between 268 and 328)
- Flavius Domitianus (end 3rd century–beginning 4th century)
- Manilius Rusticianus (307 or 309–310)
- Scribonius (between 286 and 312)
- Aurelius Victorianus (313?)
- Gaius Caelius Saturninus (after 312)
- Profuturus (318–319)
- Mastichianus (326)
- Neratius Cerealis (328)
- Lucius Crepereius Madalianus (337–341)
- Marcus Maecilius Memmius Furius Baburius Caecilianus Placidus (before 340)
- Lucius Aurelius Avianius Symmachus (340–350)
- Antiochus (350–400)
- Publius Attius Clementinus (350–400)
- Flavius Hesychius (361–363)
- Maximus (365)
- Julianus (366)
- Aurelianus (367)
- Maximinus (368–370)
- Ursicinus (372)
- Sempronius Faustus (375–378)
- Proculus Gregorius (377)
- Herculius (383–388)
- Nicetius (385)
- Ragonius Vincentius Celsus (before 389)
- Numerius Projectus (393–394)
- Caecilianus (396–397)
- Petronius (400–500)
- Acholius Abydius (400–600)
- Vitalius (403)
- Flavius Alexander Cresconius (425–450)
- Achilles (450–550)
- Sabinus (522)
- Paschasius (533–537) (Note: Cassiodorus addressed a letter to him. He is probably not the same man as the vir spectabilis involved in a property dispute in 507/511. See Martindale, John R., ed. (1992). The Prosopography of the Later Roman Empire: Volume III, AD 527–641. Cambridge: Cambridge University Press. p. 969. ISBN 0-521-20160-8. and Martindale, John R., ed. (1980). The Prosopography of the Later Roman Empire: Volume II, AD 395–527. Cambridge: Cambridge University Press. p. 835. ISBN 0-521-20159-4.)

== List of known praefecti annonae urbis Alexandriae ==
- Claudius (349)
- Flavius Soterichus (350/450)

== List of known praefecti annonae Africae ==
- Amabilianus (315-316)
- Isidorus (368/375)
- Demetrianus (369-372)

== Bibliography ==
- Titus Livius (Livy), History of Rome.
- Lucius Cassius Dio, Roman History.
- Digesta, or Pandectae (The Digest).
- Barthold Georg Niebuhr, The History of Rome, Julius Charles Hare and Connop Thirlwall, trans., John Smith, Cambridge (1828).
- A. H. M. Jones & J. R. Martindale, eds., The Prosopography of the Later Roman Empire (abbreviated PLRE), Cambridge University Press (1971–1992).
- Guido Bastianini, "Lista dei prefetti d'Egitto dal 30^{a} al 299^{p}", in Zeitschrift für Papyrologie und Epigraphik, vol. 17 (1975).
- Henriette Pavis d'Escurac, La préfecture de l'annone, service administratif impérial d'Auguste à Constantin (Bibliothèque des Écoles françaises d'Athènes et de Rome, No. 226), École française de Rome, Rome (1976).
- Peter Eich, Zur Metamorphose des politischen Systems in der römischen Kaiserzeit. Die Entstehung einer „personalen Bürokratie“ im langen dritten Jahrhundert [On the metamorphosis of the political system in the Roman imperial period. The emergence of a ‘personal bureaucracy’ in the long third century]. Klio Beihefte, New Series, vol. 9. Berlin: Akademie-Verlag, ISBN 3-05-004110-2, esp. pp. 189-210.
- Andreina Magioncalda, "La carriera di l. Iulius Ursus e le alte prefetture equestri nel I sec. D.C.", in Cahiers du Centre Gustave Glotz, No. 23, pp. 113–129 (2012).
