= Marcius Agrippa =

Late 2nd/early 3rd century Roman freedman and senator

Marcius Agrippa (fl. late 2nd/early 3rd century) was originally a slave serving as a beautician. He later became a freedman in some unknown way and then (illegally) started to encroach upon the rank of Equestrian, serving as advocatus fisci (an important official of the imperial treasury) during the reign of Septimius Severus. His impersonation of a man of higher rank was discovered shortly afterwards, and the emperor exiled him to an island. He was called back to Rome by the emperor Caracalla, probably given a grant of ingenuitas, (i.e., an official declaration that he had the rights and legal status of one who had been born free) and he was elevated to senatorial rank. He was appointed by the emperor Macrinus in 217, first to the government of Pannonia and afterwards to that of Dacia.

Agrippa is almost certainly the same person as the Marcius Agrippa, Roman admiral (likely of the Misenum fleet), who is mentioned by the Augustan histories "as privy to the death of Antoninus Caracallus."

== See also ==
- List of slaves
