= Titus Furius Victorinus =

Roman eques, governor and praetorian prefect (died 168)

Titus Furius Victorinus (died AD 168) was a Roman eques who held a number of appointments during the reigns of the Emperors Antoninus Pius and Marcus Aurelius. The most prominent of these offices were praefectus vigilum, praefectus or governor of Roman Egypt, and praetorian prefect.

== Early career ==
The career of Furius Victorinus is known from an inscription found at Rome, which also informs us that the praenomen of his father was Lucius, and that he was a member of the tribe Palatina. His first appointment was a commission as military tribune or commander of the cohort I Augusta Bracarum which was stationed at the time in Roman Britain. This was followed by another commission as military tribune, this time with Legio II Adiutrix, at the time stationed at Aquincum (modern Budapest). A third commission, this time as praefectus or commander of ala Frontoniana which was stationed in Dacia. These were the usual commissions that comprise the equestrian tres militiae.

From this point Victorinus held a series of civil appointments. The first was a procurator of the XL Gallica; next was procurator or overseer of imperial properties in the Hispanic and Gaullic provinces; then he was appointed procurator ludimagni or overseer of the imperial gladiator school. Victorinus then returned to military duties, first commissioned as praefectus Classis praefecti Ravennas, or commander of the Classis Ravennas (the Roman fleet based at Ravenna), then promoted to praefectus Classis praefecti Misenensis, or commander of the Classis Misenensis (the Roman fleet based at Misenum). These were the two major Roman navies.

== Later career ==
Victorinus then returned to Rome, where he was appointed procurator a rationibus, or head of the Imperial secretariat. It may be surprising that a man who had held so many military postings would advance to the head of that department; however, Fergus Millar notes that typically "men with full military and civilian equestrian careers" were appointed to this post. This was followed by his appointment to praefectus vigilum, or overseer of the nightwatch of Rome. Victorinus then advanced to prefect of Egypt, which was a sensitive position for Egypt contributed a large share of Rome's grain needs; he held this post from 159 to 160.

Upon the death of the praetorian prefect Gaius Tattius Maximus, Victorinus was summoned to Rome to replace Maximus, along with Sextus Cornelius Repentinus. Both were present at the deathbed of emperor Antoninus Pius (7 March 161). Marcus Aurelius, who had held imperium with Antoninus Pius, promoted his brother Lucius Verus to the purple; he selected Furius Victorinus to be Verus' pretorian prefect, and the man accompanied Verus to the Eastern provinces in 162. Victorinus distinguished himself in the Parthian War, receiving dona militaria in the form of "three Crowns, four headless spears, and four siege standards". In the spring of 168, Victorinus was one of the generals leading Roman forces north against the Marcomanni, who were attempting to cross the Danube and invade Roman territory. It was at this point that the Historia Augusta reports cryptically, "The prefect Furius Victorinus was lost and the army had perished." Anthony Birley notes that while "it has been often assumed that the prefect and the troops had been killed in battle", he points out that there is no other indication that the guard under Victorinus had been engaged in fighting. "On the other hand," Birley continues, "the other sources paint a consistent picture of enormous losses from plague among the armies of Rome." Hence, it is possible that disease took Victorinus' life, as well as destroying the army.

The war against the Marcomanni continued nevertheless. Marcus Bassaeus Rufus, who had recently been promoted to prefect of Egypt, was called back to Rome and put in place of the deceased Furius Victorinus, where he proved to be equal to the challenge.

Political offices
Preceded by Marcus Sempronius Liberalis	Prefectus of Aegyptus; 159-160	Succeeded by Lucius Volusius Maecianus
