= Sextus Lucilius Bassus =

Led the legion Legio X Fretensis in the Great Jewish Revolt

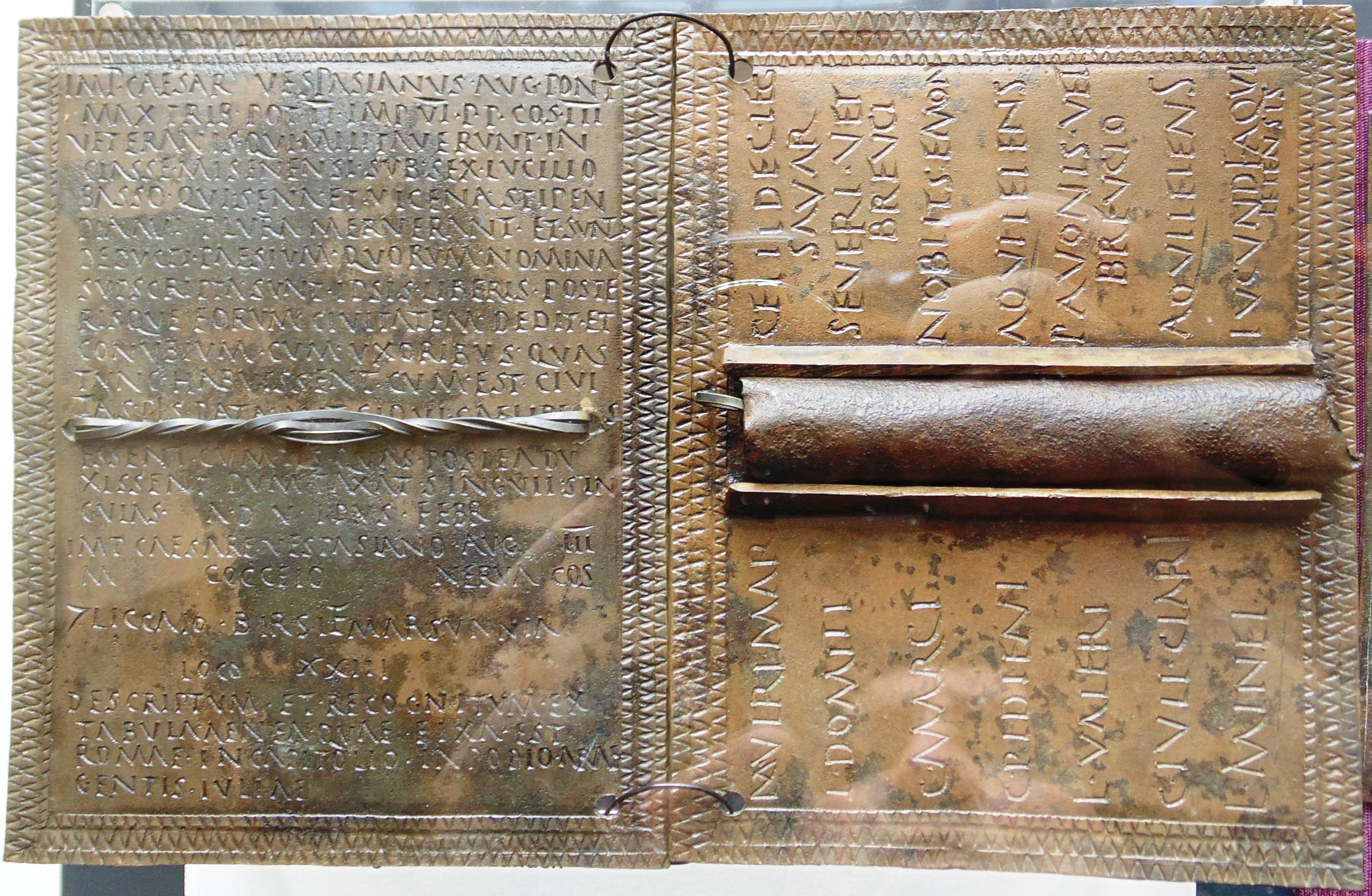
- Military diploma RMD-04, 00204, dated February 9th 71, attesting him as prefect of the Classis Misenensis

Legate of Iudaea
- In office 71–72
- Preceded by: Sextus Vettulenus Cerialis
- Succeeded by: Lucius Flavius Silva

Personal details
- Born: c. 1st century
- Died: 72 CE Masada

Sextus Lucilius Bassus was the 2nd Roman legate appointed by Emperor Vespasian to Judaea Province in 71.

== Biography ==
Assigned to eliminate the remaining resistance after the First Jewish–Roman War in the province, he led the legion Legio X Fretensis, destroying the Jewish strongholds Herodium and Machaerus on their march to the siege of Masada.

Bassus fell ill and died on the way, however, and was replaced by Lucius Flavius Silva in late 72.

Before his appointment to Iudaea, Bassus was prefect of the Classis Ravennas and the Classis Misenensis and betrayed Vitellius by siding with Vespasian during the Year of the Four Emperors (69).

== See also ==
- Gens Lucilia

Political offices
Preceded by Sextus Vettulenus Cerialis	Legate of Iudaea; 71–72	Succeeded by Lucius Flavius Silva
