= Adrianus =

2nd-century AD Greek writer

Adrianus of Tyre (Ancient Greek: Αδριανός, c. 113 – 193 AD), also written as Hadrian and Hadrianos, was a sophist of ancient Athens who flourished under the emperors Marcus Aurelius and Commodus. Adrianus was the pupil of Herodes Atticus, and obtained the chair of philosophy at Athens during the lifetime of his master, which does not seem to have impaired their mutual regard; Herodes declared that the unfinished speeches of his scholar were "the fragments of a colossus," and Adrianus showed his gratitude by a funeral oration which he pronounced over the ashes of his master.

Philostratus recounts a story of Adrianus' trial and acquittal for the murder of a begging sophist who had insulted him: Adrianus had retorted by styling such insults δήγματα κόρεων, but his pupils were not content with weapons of ridicule. Marcus Aurelius met Adrianus on a visit to Athens, invited him to Rome, and honored with his friendship: the emperor even condescended to set the thesis of a declamation for him. After the death of Aurelius he became the private secretary of Commodus. His died at Rome at the age of 80, not later than 192 AD, if Philostratus' account is true that Commodus (who was assassinated at the end of that year) sent him a letter on his death-bed.

The Suda lists Adrianus' works as Declamations, Metamorphoses (7 books), On Types of Style (5 books), On Distinctive Features in the Issues (3 books), letters, epideictic speeches, Phalaris, and Consolation to Celer. Of these works only three declamations are extant.

== Footnotes ==
=== Other sources ===
- Philostratus, Lives of the Sophists
- S. Rothe, Kommentar zu ausgewahlten Sophistenviten des Philostratos (Heidelberg 1988) 87–126.
