= 180s =

Decade

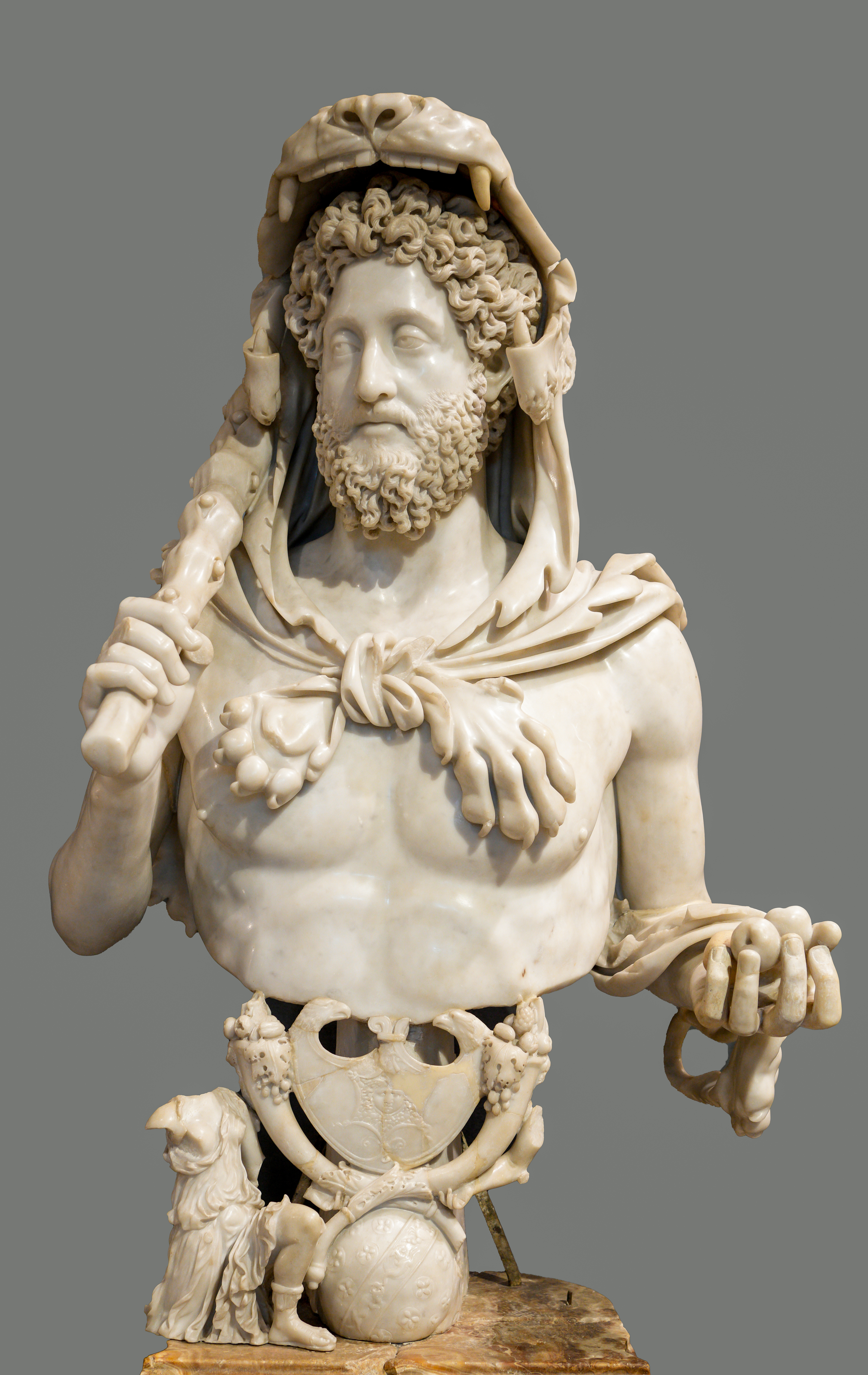
Commodus become sole Roman emperor after Marcus Aurelius's death in 180, marking the end of the Pax Romana.

The 180s decade ran from January 1, 180, to December 31, 189.

== Events ==
=== 180 ===
==== By place ====
====== Roman Empire ======
- The Quadi are chased westwards, deeper into Germania. The Praetorian prefect, Tarutenius Paternus, achieves a decisive victory against the Germanic tribes.
- March 17 – Emperor Marcus Aurelius dies after a week's illness at his camp in Vindobona (modern Vienna). He is succeeded by his son Commodus (age 18).
- The Era of the Five Good Emperors ends.
- Rome creates a 4-mile wide buffer zone by the Danube.
- Work begins in Rome on the building of the Column of Marcus Aurelius.
- 180–395 – Late Empire in Rome.
- Northern British from beyond Hadrian's Wall invade the North of modern-day England, causing Emperor Commodus to allow swathes of Northern cities to establish city walls.
- Cassius Dio arrives in Rome and becomes a Senator

====== Europe ======
- The Goths reach the banks of the Black Sea.

====== Oceania ======
- Lake Taupō in New Zealand erupts, forming ash clouds as far as China and Europe.

==== By topic ====
====== Arts and sciences ======
- In his Methodus Medendo, Greek physician Galen describes the connection between paralysis and the severing of the spinal cord.
- Galen's popular work on hygiene is published.

====== Religion ======
- July 17 – Twelve Christian inhabitants of Scillium in Numidia are executed in Carthage (also in North Africa) (known as the Scillitan Martyrs) – they had refused to swear an oath to the Emperor.
- Commodus creates an official cult of the Zoroastrian god Mithra.

=== 181 ===
==== By place ====
====== Roman Empire ======
- Imperator Lucius Aurelius Commodus and Lucius Antistius Burrus become Roman Consuls.
- The Antonine Wall is overrun by the Picts in Britannia (approximate date).

====== Asia ======
- Nanhai inspector Kong Zhi led thousands of residents to join Liang Long's rebellion against the Han dynasty.
- June: Liang Long is captured and beheaded, and his rebellion is suppressed by general Zhu Juan.

====== Oceania ======
- The volcano associated with Lake Taupō in New Zealand erupts, one of the largest on Earth in the last 5,000 years. The effects of this eruption are seen as far away as Rome and China.

=== 182 ===
==== By place ====
====== Roman Empire ======
- Emperor Commodus escapes death at the hands of assassins, who have attacked him at the instigation of his sister Lucilla and a large group of senators. He puts many distinguished Romans to death on charges of being implicated in the conspiracy; Lucilla is exiled to Capri.

=== 183 ===
- In Jiaozhi (present-day northern Vietnam), during the Second Era of Northern Domination, the local army launches a coup, captures the governor, and subsequently executes him. After the coup, Emperor Ling appoints a new Jiaozhi governor, who brings peace to the region, and is praised by the residents.

=== 184 ===
==== By place ====
====== China ======
- The Yellow Turban Rebellion and Liang Province Rebellion break out in China.
- The Disasters of the Partisan Prohibitions ends.
- Zhang Jue leads the peasant revolt against Emperor Ling of Han of the Eastern Han dynasty. Heading for the capital of Luoyang, his massive and undisciplined army (360,000 men), burns and destroys government offices and outposts.
- June – Ling of Han places his brother-in-law, He Jin, in command of the imperial army and sends them to attack the Yellow Turban rebels.
- Winter – Zhang Jue dies of illness while his brothers Zhang Bao and Zhang Liang are killed in battles against Han imperial forces. The Yellow Turban rebels become scattered.
- Last (6th) year of Guanghe era and the start of Zhongping era of the Eastern Han dynasty.

====== Korea ======
- King Gogukcheon (Gaonanwu) of Goguryeo (Gaogouli) pushes Chinese armies back to Liaodong.
- Beolhyu becomes king of Silla.

=== 185 ===
==== By place ====
====== Roman Empire ======
- Nobles of Britain demand that Emperor Commodus rescind all power given to Tigidius Perennis, who is eventually executed.
- Publius Helvius Pertinax is made governor of Britain and quells a mutiny of the British Roman legions who wanted him to become emperor. The disgruntled usurpers go on to attempt to assassinate the governor.
- Tigidius Perennis, his family and many others are executed for conspiring against Commodus.
- Commodus drains Rome's treasury to put on gladiatorial spectacles and confiscates property to support his pleasures. He participates as a gladiator and boasts of victory in 1,000 matches in the Circus Maximus.

====== China ======
- Zhi Yao, a Kushan Buddhist monk of Yuezhi ethnicity, translates Buddhist texts into the Chinese language during the Han dynasty.
- February – The rebels of the Yellow Turban are defeated by the imperial army, but only two months later, the rebellion breaks out again. It spreads to the Taihang Mountains on the western border of Hebei Province.

==== By topic ====
====== Art and Science ======
- Cleomedes discovers the refraction of light by the Earth's atmosphere.
- A supernova now known as SN 185 is noted by Chinese astronomers in the Astrological Annals of the Houhanshu, making it the earliest recorded supernova.

====== Religion ======
- Irenaeus writes that there are only four Gospels (approximate date).

=== 186 ===
==== By place ====
====== Roman Empire ======
- Peasants in Gaul stage an anti-tax uprising under Maternus.
- Roman governor Pertinax escapes an assassination attempt, by British usurpers.

====== New Zealand ======
- The Hatepe volcanic eruption extends Lake Taupō and makes skies red across the world. However, recent radiocarbon dating by R. Sparks has put the date at 233 AD ± 13 (95% confidence).

=== 187 ===
==== By place ====
====== Roman Empire ======
- Septimius Severus marries Julia Domna (age 17), a Syrian princess, at Lugdunum (modern-day Lyon). She is the youngest daughter of high-priest Julius Bassianus – a descendant of the Royal House of Emesa. Her elder sister is Julia Maesa.
- Clodius Albinus defeats the Chatti, a highly organized German tribe that controlled the area that includes the Black Forest.

==== By topic ====
====== Religion ======
- Olympianus succeeds Pertinax as bishop of Byzantium (until 198).

=== 188 ===
==== By place ====
====== Roman Empire ======
- Publius Helvius Pertinax becomes pro-consul of Africa from 188 to 189.

====== Japan ======
- Queen Himiko (or Shingi Waō) begins her reign in Japan (until 248).

=== 189 ===
==== By place ====
====== Roman Empire ======
- Plague (possibly smallpox) kills as many as 2,000 people per day in Rome. Farmers are unable to harvest their crops, and food shortages bring riots in the city.

====== China ======
- Liu Bian succeeds Emperor Ling, as Chinese emperor of the Han dynasty.
- Dong Zhuo has Liu Bian deposed, and installs Emperor Xian as emperor.
- Two thousand eunuchs in the palace are slaughtered in a violent purge in Luoyang, the capital of Han.

==== By topic ====
====== Arts and sciences ======
- Galen publishes his "Treatise on the various temperaments" (aka On the Elements According to Hippocrates).

====== Religion ======
- Pope Victor I succeeds Pope Eleuterus as the fourteenth pope, the first from Africa.
- Demetrius of Alexandria becomes Patriarch of Alexandria.
- Pantaenus, who was sent by the bishop of Alexandria to India to preach Christianity, meets with little success.

== Significant people ==
- Commodus, Roman Emperor

== Births ==
180

- Ardashir I, founder of the Sasanian Empire (d. 242)
- Johanan bar Nappaha, Jewish rabbi (d. 279)
- Julia Soaemias, mother of Elagabalus (d. 222)
- Sima Fu, Chinese prince and statesman (d. 272)

181

- April 2 – Xian of Han, Chinese emperor (d. 234)
- Zhuge Liang, Chinese chancellor and regent (d. 234)

182

- July 5 – Sun Quan, Chinese emperor of the Eastern Wu state (d. 252)
- Zhu Ran, Chinese general of the Eastern Wu state (d. 249)

183

- January 26 – Lady Zhen, wife of the Cao Wei state Emperor Cao Pi (d. 221)
- Hu Zong, Chinese general, official and poet of the Eastern Wu state (d. 242)
- Liu Zan (Zhengming), Chinese general of the Eastern Wu state (d. 255)
- Lu Xun, Chinese general and politician of the Eastern Wu state (d. 245)

184

- Guo Nüwang, Chinese empress of the Cao Wei state (d. 235)
- Origen, Christian scholar and theologian (approximate date)
- Sun Yi, Chinese general (d. 204)
- Wang Xiang, Chinese official and politician (d. 268)

185

- Liu Ji (or Jingyu), Chinese official and minister (d. 233)
- Origen, Christian scholar and theologian (approximate date)
- Wang Xiang, Chinese minister of the Cao Wei state (d. 269)

186

- Ma Liang, Chinese official of the Shu Han state (d. 222)

187

- Cao Pi, Chinese emperor of the Cao Wei state (d. 226)
- Gu Shao, Chinese official and politician (d. 218)

188

- April 4 – Caracalla (or Antoninus), Roman emperor (d. 217)
- Lu Ji (or Gongji), Chinese official and politician (d. 219)
- Sun Shao, Chinese general of the Eastern Wu state (d. 241)

189

- March 7 – Publius Septimius Geta, Roman emperor (d. 211)
- Ling Tong, Chinese general of the Eastern Wu state (d. 217)
- Zhang Chunhua, Chinese noblewoman and aristocrat (d. 247)

== Deaths ==
180

- March 17 – Marcus Aurelius, Roman emperor (b. 121)
- Aulus Gellius, Roman author and grammarian (b. 125 AD)
- Gaius, Roman jurist and writer (approximate date)
- Hegesippus, Christian chronicler and writer (b. 110)
- Lucian of Samosata, Syrian rhetorician (b. 125 AD)
- Melito of Sardis, bishop of Sardis (approximate date)
- Pinytus, bishop of Knossos (approximate date)

181

- Aelius Aristides, Greek orator and writer (b. 117)
- Cao Jie, Chinese court eunuch and official

182

- Lucilla, Roman empress and daughter of Marcus Aurelius
- Marcus Ummidius Quadratus, Roman politician (b. 138)
- Saoterus, Bithynian Greek freedman and chamberlain
- Ummidia Cornificia Faustina, Roman noblewoman (b. 141)

184

- June 6 – Qiao Xuan (or Gongzu), Chinese official (b. 110)
- Adalla of Silla, Korean ruler (House of Park)
- Zhang Jue, Chinese leader of the Yellow Turban Rebellion

185

- April 21 – Apollonius the Apologist, Christian apologist
- Pharasmanes III (or P'arsman), Georgian king of Iberia
- Tigidius Perennis, Roman praetorian prefect (executed)

186

- April 21 – Apollonius the Apologist, Christian martyr
- Bian Zhang, Chinese official and general (b. 133)
- Paccia Marciana, Roman noblewoman (approximate date)
- Sohaemus, Roman client king of Armenia

187

- Chen Shi, Chinese official and politician (b. 104)
- Maternus, Gaulish rebel leader (approximate date)
- Pertinax, bishop of Byzantium

188

- March 17 – Julian, pope and patriarch of Alexandria
- Fa Zhen (or Gaoqing), Chinese scholar (b. AD 100)
- Lucius Antistius Burrus, Roman politician (executed)
- Ma Xiang, Chinese rebel leader (approximate date)
- Publius Atilius Aebutianus, Roman prefect (executed)
- Shusun Tong, Chinese official and ritual specialist
- Qiangqui, Chinese ruler of the southern Xiongnu

189

- May 13 – Ling of Han (or Liu Hong), Chinese emperor (b. 156)
- May 24 – Eleutherius, bishop of Rome (or Catholic Church)
- September 22 – He Jin, Chinese Grand Marshal and regent
- Ding Yuan (or Jian Yang), Chinese official and warlord
- Jian Shuo, Chinese eunuch leader (Ten Attendants)
- Lingsi (or He), Chinese empress of the Han dynasty
- Xiaoren, Chinese empress dowager of the Han dynasty
