= Roman Empire (TV series) =

American drama series

- Genre: Historical drama Documentary
- Written by: Jeremiah Murphy; Peter Sherman; Brian Burstein (season 2); John Ealer (season 2); Steve Loh (season 2)
- Directed by: Richard Lopez; John Ealer (season 2)
- Starring: Sean Bean; Aaron Jakubenko; Ditch Davey; Ido Drent
- Countries of origin: United States; Australia
- Original language: English
- No. of seasons: 3
- No. of episodes: 15

Production
- Cinematography: Miltj on Kam
- Production company: Stephen David Entertainment

Original release
- Network: Netflix
- Release: November 11, 2016 – April 5, 2019

Roman Empire is a television docudrama based on historical events of the Roman Empire. The show is in the anthology format with each season presenting an independent story. Season 1, "Reign of Blood", is a six-part story about Emperor Commodus. Jeremiah Murphy and Peter Sherman collaborated on writing the first season, with Richard Lopez directing. It premiered on Netflix on November 11, 2016. Season 2, "Master of Rome", premiered on July 27, 2018; it is a five-part story about the rise of Dictator Julius Caesar and the fall of the Roman Republic. Season 3, "The Mad Emperor", premiered on Netflix on April 5, 2019, and is a four-part story about Emperor Caligula.

The series was produced by Netflix as a Netflix original series, though it frequently reuses footage from other programs, including Ancient Rome: The Rise and Fall of an Empire (2006).

== Cast ==
=== Season 1: Reign of Blood ===
- Sean Bean as Narrator
- Aaron Jakubenko as Commodus
- Lisa Chappell as Faustina the Younger
- Ella Becroft as Bruttia Crispina
- Edwin Wright as Cassius Dio
- Genevieve Aitken as Marcia
- Jared Turner as Cleander
- John Bach as Marcus Aurelius
- Tai Berdinner-Blades as Lucilla
- Calum Gittins as Saoterus
- Mike Edward as Narcissus

=== Season 2: Master of Rome ===
- Steve West as Narrator
- Ditch Davey as Julius Caesar
- Tim Carlsen as Mark Antony
- Natalie Medlock as Servilia
- Ben Black as Brutus
- Stephen Lovatt as Pompey
- Wesley Dowdell as Crassus
- Andrew Robertt as Cato
- Taylor Hall as Young Caesar
- Jessica Green as Cleopatra
- Errol Shand as Vercingetorix
- Phoenix Connolly as Julia
- Mana Hira Davis as Spartacus
- Greg Stockwell as Roman Senator

=== Season 3: The Mad Emperor ===
- Steve West as Narrator
- Ido Drent as Caligula
- Craig Walsh-Wrightson as Tiberius
- Kelson Henderson as Claudius
- Colin Moy as Cassius
- Teressa Liane as Agrippina
- Leon Wadham as Tiberius Gemellus
- Michael Morris as Naevius Sutorius Macro
- Molly Leishman as Livilla
- Elizabeth Dowden as Drusilla
- Jay Simon as Senator Regulus

== Episodes ==
As Roman Empire is an anthology series, each season tells its own story, and each season has its own title.

Season	Episodes	Originally released
1	6	November 11, 2016
2	5	July 27, 2018
3	4	April 5, 2019

=== Season 1 (2016) ===
The first season is named Commodus: Reign of Blood, and consists of six episodes. It became available for streaming on November 11, 2016.

No. overall	No. in season	Title	Directed by	Written by	Original release date
1	1	"Born in the Purple"	Richard Lopez	Jeremiah Murphy	November 11, 2016
Lucilla, the older sister of Commodus, has no chance of becoming a female head of state. With the premature news of her husband's death, Faustina rushes to Roman Egypt to back the governor Avidius Cassius's usurpation.
2	2	"The Making of an Emperor"	Richard Lopez	Peter Sherman	November 11, 2016
The marriage of Commodus to Bruttia Crispina has a strategic value of strengthening his bond with the senatorial class in Rome. Following the advice of Cleander and Saoterus, Commodus ends the campaigns in Germania after his father's death.
3	3	"Enemy of the Senate"	Richard Lopez	Jeremiah Murphy	November 11, 2016
Commodus bankrolls gladiatorial fights by taxing the Senate. This angers key members of the Senate such as Cassius Dio and Quintianus who plots with Lucilla against Commodus.
4	4	"Rome is Burning"	Richard Lopez	Peter Sherman	November 11, 2016
Commodus exiles his sister Lucilla on the island of Capri. Cleander begins selling Senate seats. When his wife Crispina does not produce an heir, Commodus banishes her to Capri; at the same time, Commodus takes on an extra-marital lover Marcia who herself is still married to Eclectus.
5	5	"Fight for Glory"	Richard Lopez	Jeremiah Murphy	November 11, 2016
Commodus asks Narcissus to train him as a gladiator.
6	6	"14 Days of Blood"	Richard Lopez	Peter Sherman	November 11, 2016
Marcia fails in poisoning Commodus. All the Senators are scared of being executed by Commodus at any moment. Commodus becomes the first and only Roman emperor to fight as a gladiator. At the end, Narcissus assassinates Commodus. The Year of the 5 Emperors (193) ensues. Afterwards, Narcissus is executed. Also, the next emperor Didius Julianus executes Marcia. The Senator Cassius Dio survives and chronicles the events of his times. Dio is a Roman and writes his account in the Greek language which had become the language of the educated Romans even in the western half--like Marcus Aurelius.

=== Season 2 (2018) ===
The second season is named Julius Caesar: Master of Rome, and consists of five episodes. It became available for streaming on July 27, 2018.

No. overall	No. in season	Title	Directed by	Written by	Original release date
7	1	"The Triumvirate"	John Ealer	Steve Loh	July 27, 2018
Crassus defeats the army of Spartacus at the Battle of the Silarius River, Italia, in 71 BCE.
8	2	"The Great Conqueror"	John Ealer	Steve Loh	July 27, 2018
Vercingetorix wants to form a pan-Gallic confederacy (today's France, Belgium, Luxembourg, Switzerland, and Monaco) to stand in the way of Caesar's army.
9	3	"Crossing the Rubicon"	John Ealer	Steve Loh	July 27, 2018
After Caesar crosses the Rubicon, Pompey, the consul presiding over the Roman Senate, doesn't have an army under his control in the Rome area. So, Pompey rushes to the east in the region of Greece to request that the scattered Roman armies not allied with Caesar come to his aid to make a stand against Caesar at the Battle of Pharsalus.
10	4	"Queen of the Nile"	John Ealer	Steve Loh	July 27, 2018
Ptolemy XIII Theos Philopator executes the recently-arrived Pompey in Alexandria. Caesar forms an alliance with Cleopatra against her brother and husband Ptolemy XIII.
11	5	"The Ides of March"	John Ealer	Steve Loh	July 27, 2018
Caesar returns to Rome and convinces the Senate to declare him a dictator for 10 years. Cleopatra makes a state visit to Rome and announces that Caesarion is Caesar's son. After becoming dictator in perpetuity, Caesar plans to invade Parthia like Crassus.

=== Season 3 (2019) ===
The third season is named Caligula: The Mad Emperor, and consists of four episodes. It became available for streaming on April 5, 2019.

No. overall	No. in season	Title	Directed by	Written by	Original release date
12	1	"The Rightful Heir"	John Ealer	Steve Loh	April 5, 2019
Drusus, the son of Tiberius, is the heir apparent to become the Caesar (Roman Emperor).
13	2	"A New Hope"	John Ealer	Steve Loh	April 5, 2019
Tiberius designates his grandson Gemellus and Caligula as co-heirs in his will. Caligula is initially very popular in Rome because of the very favorable reputation of his famous father Germanicus who had waged successful campaigns in Germania. Macro supplants Sejanus as the prefect of the Praetorian Guard. Upon becoming the Roman Emperor, Caligula orders the killing of Gemellus. He also revives gladiatorial fights. Caligula appoints Claudius, his uncle, as his co-consul (the Roman Republic had 2 consuls at a time). The 3 sisters of Caligula, (1) Agrippina, (2) Drusilla, and (3) Livilla gain prominence in Caligula's court.
14	3	"In Search of an Heir"	John Ealer	Steve Loh	April 5, 2019
Caligula orders the killing of Macro, the Praetorian Guard Prefect. Caligula has intercourse with all three of his sisters. His intercourses with Agrippina doesn't produce a child. On the other hand, his intercourse with his sister Drusilla makes her pregnant who dies in childbirth without producing a baby. Caligula declared the deceased Drusilla a Roman goddess a la Juno which was uncommon as Roman had no precedent of declaring deceased female figures goddesses. Having caused outrage in Roman society where incest was extremely taboo, Caligula degrades himself more by behaving out of character with his royal station. He married a Caesonia, a woman already 8 months pregnant with another man. Their offspring is a daughter. Lepidus, Livilla, and Agrippina conspire in the Plot of the Three Daggers.
15	4	"Descent into Madness"	John Ealer	Steve Loh	April 5, 2019
Agrippina exposes the Plot of the Three Daggers to Caligula even though it was her brainchild. All three of the participants are apprehended by the Praetorian Guard. With the approval of Caligula's uncle Claudius, Cassius Chaerea leads the Praetorian Guard in assassinating the unstable Caligula.

== Production ==
The first series was filmed in 2015 at Studio West in West Auckland, New Zealand. Filming for the second season took place in 2017.

== Historical people and events ==
=== Commodus: Reign of Blood ===
- Commodus was Roman Emperor from AD 180 to AD 192. He also ruled as co-emperor with his father Marcus Aurelius from 177 until his father's death in 180.
- Marcus Aurelius was Roman Emperor from 161 to 180. He ruled with Lucius Verus as co-emperor from 161 until Verus' death in 169. Marcus Aurelius was the last of the so-called Five Good Emperors. He was a practitioner of Stoicism, and his Greek-language writing, commonly known as the Meditations, is the most significant source of the modern understanding of ancient Stoic philosophy.
- Faustina the Younger was a daughter of Roman Emperor Antoninus Pius. She was a Roman Empress and wife to her maternal cousin Marcus Aurelius. Though Roman sources give a generally negative view of her character, she was held in high esteem by soldiers and her own husband and was given divine honors after her death.
- Lucilla was the second daughter and third child of Roman Emperor Marcus Aurelius and an elder sister to future Roman Emperor Commodus.
- Avidius Cassius was a Roman general and usurper who briefly ruled Egypt and Syria in 175.

=== Julius Caesar: Master of Rome ===
- Julius Caesar (12 July 100 BC – 15 March 44 BC), a politician, general, and later, dictator; the season's central argument is that Julius Caesar was assassinated because wealthy and conservative elites wanted to block Caesar's reforms.
- Pompey, politician and military leader who, while as ambitious as Caesar, and despite having been his son-in-law, chose to ally himself with the optimates in opposing Caesar and supporting the traditional Roman Republic.
- Crassus, the richest man in Rome, who rose to political prominence following his victory over the slave revolt led by Spartacus, sharing the consulship with his rival Pompey
- Servilia, the mother of Marcus Junius Brutus and former lover of Caesar
- Brutus, a Roman politician whose relationship with Caesar is deeply complex
- Mark Antony, an hedonistic Roman general and politician; while Caesar was away in Egypt, Antony remained in Rome to restore order but quickly caused Rome to fall into a state of anarchy.
- Cleopatra, the last ruler of Egypt.
- Vercingetorix, king of the Arverni tribe; he leads the Gauls in a revolt against Rome

=== Caligula: The Mad Emperor ===
- Caligula
- Gaius Caesar Augustus Germanicus (31 August 12AD – 24 January 41AD)
- Claudius
- Cassius Chaerea

== See also ==
- Gladiator, a 2000 fictionalized film telling of the life of Commodus.
- Rome, a fictional account of the fall of the Republic.
- The Fall of the Roman Empire, another fictionalized telling of the life of Commodus.
