= Tigidia gens =

Ancient Roman family

The gens Tigidia was an obscure plebeian family at ancient Rome. The only member of this gens to appear in history was Sextus Tigidius Perennis, prefect of the praetorian guard early in the reign of Commodus, but others are known from inscriptions.

== Origin ==
The nomen Tigidius belongs to a large class of gentilicia formed using the suffix -idius, originally derived from cognomina ending in -idus, but later regarded as a regular gentile-forming suffix.

== Members ==
This list includes abbreviated praenomina. For an explanation of this practice, see filiation.

- Tigidius Communius, named in an inscription from Cales in Campania, dating between the late first century BC and the early first century AD.
- Gaius Tigidius Barbarus Pines, buried at Tarentum in Calabria, aged fifty, in a tomb dating from the first half of the first century.
- Sextus Tigidius Orestes, one of the Seviri Augustales at Narona in Dalmatia, listed in an inscription from the first or second century.
- Tigidius, dedicated a tomb at the present site of Carassai, formerly part of Picenum, dating between the late first century and the middle of the second, for Attia Rufina.
- Sextus Tigidius Perennis, named praetorian prefect in AD 182, alongside Publius Tarrutenius Paternus. After the fall of Paternus, Perennis assumed control of the government by perusading Commodus to spend his time pursuing pleasure and debauchery. Perennis used his power to enrich himself and dispose of his enemies, (Note: So according to Herodian and the Historia Augusta, but Cassius Dio has a more favourable opinion, reporting that Perennis had been a powerful restraining influence on Commodus, and that his chief fault was in failing to intercede on behalf of his colleague, Paternus.) but he suddenly fell from power over his conduct regarding the soldiers in Britain, and was put to death, along with his son.
- Lucius Tigidius Proculus, buried at Risinium in Dalmatia in a tomb dedicated by his sister, Tigidia Tertulla, dating between the middle of the second century, and the end of the third.
- Tigidia Tertulla, dedicated a tomb at Risinium, dating between the middle of the second century and the end of the third, for her brother, Lucius Tigidius Proculus.

=== Undated Tigidii ===
- Tigidius, the father of Julia Aesiva, a woman buried at Augusta Treverorum in Gallia Belgica, in a tomb dedicated by her husband, Speratius Socralis.
- Tigidia Sex. f. Accepta, buried at Firmum Picenum in Picenum.

== See also ==
- List of Roman gentes

== Bibliography ==
- Lucius Cassius Dio, Roman History.
- Herodianus, Tes Meta Marcon Basileas Istoria (History of the Empire from the Death of Marcus Aurelius).
- Aelius Lampridius, Aelius Spartianus, Flavius Vopiscus, Julius Capitolinus, Trebellius Pollio, and Vulcatius Gallicanus, Historia Augusta (Lives of the Emperors).
- Dictionary of Greek and Roman Biography and Mythology, William Smith, ed., Little, Brown and Company, Boston (1849).
- Theodor Mommsen et alii, Corpus Inscriptionum Latinarum (The Body of Latin Inscriptions, abbreviated CIL), Berlin-Brandenburgische Akademie der Wissenschaften (1853–present).
- René Cagnat et alii, L'Année épigraphique (The Year in Epigraphy, abbreviated AE), Presses Universitaires de France (1888–present).
- George Davis Chase, "The Origin of Roman Praenomina", in Harvard Studies in Classical Philology, vol. VIII, pp. 103–184 (1897).
- Paul von Rohden, Elimar Klebs, & Hermann Dessau, Prosopographia Imperii Romani (The Prosopography of the Roman Empire, abbreviated PIR), Berlin (1898).
- Hermann Finke, "Neue Inschriften", in Berichte der Römisch-Germanischen Kommission, vol. xvii, pp. 1–107, 198–231 (1927).
- Anna and Jaroslav Šašel, Inscriptiones Latinae quae in Iugoslavia inter annos MCMXL et MCMLX repertae et editae sunt (Inscriptions from Yugoslavia Found and Published between 1940 and 1960), Ljubljana (1963–1986).
