= Tarrutenia gens =

Ancient Roman family

The gens Tarrutenia or Tarutenia was an obscure plebeian family at ancient Rome. Only a few members of this gens are mentioned in history, but others are known from inscriptions. The most illustrious of the Tarrutenii was probably Publius Tarrutenius Paternus, a jurist of the late second century, who was praetorian prefect during the reign of Commodus.

== Members ==
- Publius Tarrutenius Cogitatus, named in an inscription from Augusta Taurinorum in Liguria.
- Tarutenius Januarius, made an offering at Savaria in Pannonia Superior, dating between the middle of the second century and the end of the third.
- (Tarrutenius?) Marcianus, the father of a certain Maximilianus who was one of the senate's emissaries to Honorius at Ravenna in AD 409, and who upon his return was captured by the Visigoths under Alaric. Marcianus ransomed his son for the sum of 30,000 solidi. The son's identification with Tarrutenius Maximilianus is very uncertain.
- Tarrutenius Maximilianus, a man of senatorial rank, was the father-in-law of Anicius Acilius Glabrio Faustus, who honored him and his achievements during his consulship in AD 438. He might be Maximilianus, the son of Marcianus, who was ransomed from Alaric in AD 409.
- Publius Tarrutenius Paternus, the secretary in charge of Marcus Aurelius' Latin correspondence, was sent by the emperor as an emissary to the Cotini. That tribe had offered to fight against the Marcomanni, but after Paternus' arrival, they forgot their promise, and mistreated the Roman emissary. Paternus was later known as a jurist, and the author of De Re Militari, a work on military law, cited by the Digest. Vegetius considered him an authority on the subject. He was praetorian prefect under Commodus, and may have been executed on a charge of treason, although the sources differ on this.
- Tarutenia Paulina, likely a noblewoman, is mentioned in an inscription found near Praeneste in Latium.
- Publius Tarrutenius Proculus, a native of Augusta Taurinorum, was a soldier in the Legio II Adiutrix. He was buried at Aquincum in Pannonia Inferior, aged seventy-seven, with a monument built by Quintus Cornelius Felix, the prefect of the cornicularii, out of the legacy left him by Proculus, and dating from the first half of the second century.

== See also ==
- List of Roman gentes

== Bibliography ==
- Lucius Cassius Dio, Roman History.
- Aelius Lampridius, Aelius Spartianus, Flavius Vopiscus, Julius Capitolinus, Trebellius Pollio, and Vulcatius Gallicanus, Historia Augusta (Lives of the Emperors).
- Publius Vegetius Renatus, De Re Militari.
- Zosimus, Historia Nova (New History).
- Theodor Mommsen et alii, Corpus Inscriptionum Latinarum (The Body of Latin Inscriptions, abbreviated CIL), Berlin-Brandenburgische Akademie der Wissenschaften (1853–present).
- Paul von Rohden, Elimar Klebs, & Hermann Dessau, Prosopographia Imperii Romani (The Prosopography of the Roman Empire, abbreviated PIR), Berlin (1898).
