= Gaius Aufidius Victorinus =

2nd century Roman senator, general and governor

Gaius Aufidius Victorinus was a Roman senator and general of the second century. A friend of the Emperor Marcus Aurelius and the son-in-law of the advocate and orator Marcus Cornelius Fronto, he was twice consul and governor of several Roman provinces.

== Career ==
Victorinus came from Pisaurum in Umbria. He was a student of Fronto at the same time as Marcus Aurelius, where their friendship began.

In 155 Victorinus became suffect consul, then from c. 162 to c. 166 he was governor of Germania Superior, where he was commissioned to repulse the invading Chatti, which he did successfully. Two letters Fronto wrote to him while governor survive. In the first, Fronto petitions for his help in getting a position for the rhetorician Antoninus Aquila. In the second, Fronto updates Victorinus about his two sons, whom Victorinus had left with Fronto while in Germania Superior.

After his tenure in Germania Superior, Victorinus became governor of Dacia (168/9), then Hispania Baetica (probably 170/1) and Hispania Tarraconensis (171-172). Victorinus then held the Proconsulate of Africa (c. 173/5) and between 177 and 179 was governor of Syria. In the last year of his tenure as Urban prefect (probably from 179 to 183), Victorinus was consul a second time with Commodus as his colleague.

At the death of Marcus Aurelius and the beginning of Commodus' tenure, Victorinus was still in high esteem, but Cassius Dio suggests that Commodus, probably at the instigation of the powerful Praetorian prefect Sextus Tigidius Perennis, sought to kill Victorinus.

== Family ==
Victorinus married Fronto's daughter Gratia. They had at least three sons. One died at the age of three in Germania Superior while Victorinus was governor of that province. The other two are Marcus Aufidius Fronto (consul ordinarius 199) and Gaius Aufidius Victorinus (consul ordinarius 200).

Political offices
Preceded by Gaius Julius Severus, and Marcus Junius Rufinus Sabinianus as consules ordinarii	Consul of the Roman Empire; 155 with Marcus Gavius Appalius	Succeeded by Antius Pollio, and Minicius Opimianus as consules suffecti
Preceded by Marcus Petronius Sura Mamertinus, and Quintus Tineius Rufus as consules ordinarii	Consul of the Roman Empire; 183 with Commodus IV	Succeeded by Lucius Tutilius Pontianus Gentianus, and ignotus as consules suffecti
