= Quintus Tineius Demetrius =

Roman governor of Egypt from 189 to 190

Quintus Tineius Demetrius was a Roman eques who is known to have held imperial appointments during the reign of the Emperor Commodus. He is known from inscriptions and surviving documents written on papyrus.

The most important appointment Demetrius held was praefectus or governor of Roman Egypt, where he is attested in office from 23 August 189 to 17 August 190. His primary concern as governor of Egypt was to safeguard the harvest and delivery of grain to the populace of Rome, but surviving documents from his administration show his responsibilities extended further. Foremost was the processing of the provincial census (apographa), which was held once every 14 years. Letters survive Demetrius wrote to one Dioskoros concerning shortages in a granary, possibly the one at Karanis.

Political offices
Preceded by Marcus Aurelius Papirius Dionysius	Prefectus of Aegyptus; 189-190	Succeeded by Claudius Lucilianus
