= Marcus Aurelius Cleander =

Freedman and favourite of emperor Commodus (died 190)

- Born: Phrygia (modern-day Turkey)
- Died: 190; Rome, Italy
- Military career
- Allegiance: Roman Empire
- Service years: 182–190
- Rank: Praetorian prefect
- Commands: Praetorian Guard

Marcus Aurelius Cleander (Greek: Μᾶρκος Αὐρήλιος Κλέανδρος; died 19 April 190), commonly known as Cleander, was a Roman freedman who gained extraordinary power as chamberlain and favourite of the emperor Commodus, rising to command the Praetorian Guard and bringing the principal offices of the Roman state into disrepute by selling them to the highest bidder. His career is narrated by Dio Cassius, Herodian and the Historia Augusta.

== Career ==
Cleander's date of birth is unknown but according to Herodian he was a Phrygian and "one of the slaves offered for sale by the public auctioneer for the benefit of the state"; according to Dio Cassius he was sold in Rome as one of a consignment of slaves to be a pack-carrier. By 182 however he had risen high enough to be an official of the Imperial household, and had married the Emperor's mistress Damostratia. Cleander was instrumental in the death of Commodus's favourite, the chamberlain Saoterus, attaining his position and soon enjoying the emperor's full confidence. He began to plot against the Praetorian Prefect Tigidius Perennis, who exercised the chief responsibilities of government since the indolent Commodus preferred not to concern himself with administration.

In 184 he enabled a detachment of soldiers from Britain brought to Italy to suppress banditry, to denounce Perennis to the Emperor. Commodus gave them permission to execute the Prefect. Cleander proceeded to concentrate power in his own hands and to enrich himself by becoming responsible for all public offices: he sold and bestowed entry to the Roman Senate, army commands, governorships and, increasingly, even the suffect consulships. Early in 188 Cleander disposed of the current praetorian prefect, Atilius Aebutianus, and himself took over supreme command of the Praetorians with the rank of a pugione (dagger-bearer) with two praetorian prefects subordinate to him. Now at the zenith of his power, he continued to sell public offices to the highest bidder as his private business. The climax came in the year 190 which had 25 suffect consuls—a record in the 1,000-year history of the Roman consulship—all appointed by Cleander (they included the future Emperor Septimius Severus). Cleander shared the proceeds with the Emperor, but also used some of it for buildings and other public works.

In April 190 Rome was afflicted by a food shortage, which the praefectus annonae Papirius Dionysius, in charge of the grain supply, contrived to make worse than it actually was and who laid the blame on Cleander. During the seventh horse-race of the ludi Ceriales in the Circus Maximus, a group of children incited the audience to riot against Cleander. In response, he sent the Praetorian Guard to put down the disturbances but Pertinax, the praefectus urbi (city prefect of Rome), despatched the vigiles Urbani to oppose them. Cleander fled to Commodus for protection, but the mob followed him calling for his head. At the urging of his mistress Marcia, Commodus had Cleander beheaded and his son killed. All of this likely had transpired on 19 April 190.

As Edward Gibbon relates it,

The people... demanded with angry clamors the head of the public enemy. Cleander, who commanded the Praetorian Guards, ordered a body of cavalry to sally forth and disperse the seditious multitude. The multitude fled with precipitation towards the city; several were slain, and many more were trampled to death; but when the cavalry entered the streets their pursuit was checked by a shower of stones and darts from the roofs and windows of the houses. The footguards, who had long been jealous of the prerogatives and insolence of the Praetorian cavalry, embraced the party of the people. The tumult became a regular engagement and threatened a general massacre. The Praetorians at length gave way, oppressed with numbers; and the tide of popular fury returned with redoubled violence against the gates of the palace, where Commodus lay dissolved in luxury, and alone unconscious of the civil war... Commodus started from his dream of pleasure and commanded that the head of Cleander should be thrown out to the people. The desired spectacle instantly appeased the tumult...

This mirrored the previous incident in which the legions of Britain had demanded and received the death of Perennis, because of which the mob realized that it had every chance of success.

== Modern interpretations ==
- Cleander figures as a character in the 1964 film epic The Fall of the Roman Empire, where he is played by Mel Ferrer. He is depicted as a sinister blind man who poisons Commodus's father, the Emperor Marcus Aurelius. He thereafter remains a background presence throughout the film and is shown in one scene at the occasion of Commodus's death, by which time the historical Cleander had been dead for two years.
- In the 2016 six-part docu-series Roman Empire: Reign of Blood, Cleander was played by Jared Turner.
