= Papirius Dionysius =

Roman eques, official and jurist (died c.190)

Marcus Aurelius Papirius Dionysius (died c. 190) was a Roman eques and jurist who held a number of military and civilian positions during the reign of the Emperors Marcus Aurelius and his son Commodus, including praefectus annonae, or overseer of the grain rations for Rome.

The career of Papirius Dionysius is partially documented in an incomplete inscription recovered from Antium. It attests several positions he held: prefectus vehiculorum, or director of the public post; sacerdos confarreationum et diffarreationum, or official responsible for conducting the ancient form of Roman marriage; and member the advisory board (consilium principis) to the emperor as legal adviser (centenario consiliario Augusti). Due to the incomplete nature of the text, we cannot be certain of the order or date of these positions, except that they were earlier in his career than the major one he held -- praefectus annonae.

It was in this office that he intrigued to bring the downfall of the praetorian prefect Marcus Aurelius Cleander. Dionysius abused his office to artifice an impending famine in Rome by deliberately withholding the grain reserves. This led to a revolt in the Circus Maximus during a horse race, when the crowd was convinced that Cleander was responsible for the lack of food, who then marched to where the emperor Commodus was. To appease the crowd, he had Cleander and his son executed. However, Dionysius did not enjoy his success for very long, as the emperor Commodus later ordered his death.

While some authorities believe he was also prefect or governor of Roman Egypt, it is unclear whether Papirius Dionysius actually held the office: while Guido Bastianini includes Dionysius in his list of prefects, dating his tenure to around 188, in a footnote he admits that his prefecture "has not been attested by any papyrological or epigraphic source in Egypt", while noting that "Dionysius, slandered by Cleander, was dismissed before he even reached Alexandria; see the case of Sutorius Macro, in 38".

Political offices
Preceded by Marcus Aurelius Verrianus	Prefectus of Aegyptus c. 188	Succeeded by Quintus Tineius Demetrius
