= Publius Atilius Aebutianus =

Roman equestrian officer (died 188 CE)

- Born: Unknown; Asseria, Dalmatia
- Died: 188 CE; Rome, Roman Empire
- Military career
- Allegiance: Roman Empire
- Branch: Praetorian Guard
- Service years: 185–188
- Rank: Praetorian prefect
- Commands: Praetorian Guard

Publius Atilius Aebutianus (died 188 CE) was a Roman equestrian officer who served as Praetorian prefect during the reign of Emperor Commodus, from 185 until his death. He succeeded Sextus Tigidius Perennis and was later executed by the emperor's chamberlain, Marcus Aurelius Cleander.

== Early life and career ==
Aebutianus was likely born in Asseria, a town in Dalmatia (modern-day Croatia). His prominence is attested by an inscription from Asseria, honoring him as patronus of the town, indicating his high status and influence.

== Praetorian Prefect ==
Aebutianus was appointed praetorian prefect in 185 CE, following the execution of his predecessor, Perennis. The praetorian prefect commanded the elite Praetorian Guard, the emperor's personal bodyguard, and played a central role in imperial administration.

== Downfall and death ==
In 188 CE, Aebutianus was implicated in a conspiracy involving Lucius Antistius Burrus, a senator and former praetorian prefect. The emperor's chamberlain, Cleander, accused Aebutianus of plotting to depose Commodus. He was executed on Cleander’s orders, after which Cleander assumed control of the Praetorian Guard.

== Legacy ==
Aebutianus is primarily known through inscriptions from Asseria, which attest to his high status. His brief tenure as praetorian prefect illustrates the volatile nature of Roman imperial politics under Commodus.

== See also ==
- Praetorian Guard
- Commodus
- Marcus Aurelius Cleander
- Sextus Tigidius Perennis
