= Narcissus (wrestler) =

Roman wrestler and assassin of Emperor Commodus

Narcissus (born 2nd century A.D.) was a Roman athlete, likely a wrestler, from the 2nd century AD. He assassinated the Roman Emperor Commodus in 192 AD.

== Life and work ==
Narcissus was employed as a wrestling partner and personal trainer to Commodus in order to train him for his self-indulgent appearances in the Colosseum as a gladiator.

In AD 192, several senators, led by Praetorian prefect Quintus Aemilius Laetus, recruited Narcissus to assassinate the emperor after a previous failed attempt by the conspirators.

On 31 December 192, Commodus's concubine and conspirator Marcia poisoned Commodus's wine. The poison failed, so Narcissus entered Commodus's bedchamber. Commodus was supposedly in a drunken stupor after Marcia had poisoned him and Narcissus proceeded to strangle Commodus in his bathtub or, according to Herodian, in his bed.

== Death ==
Narcissus was executed during the series of civil wars after Commodus's death.
