= Publius Tarrutenius Paternus =

2nd century Roman soldier, senator and praetorian prefect

Publius Tarrutenius Paternus was a Roman eques who flourished during the reign of emperor Marcus Aurelius. He achieved several military successes, leading first to his appointment as praetorian prefect and subsequently to his adlection into the Roman Senate. Paternus was accused of treason by Aurelius' son and successor Commodus, and executed.

== Career ==
Paternus first appears as ab epistulis Latinis for emperor Marcus Aurelius, who had entered into negotiations with the Cotini to ally with them against their neighbors the Marcomanni. According to Cassius Dio, the Cotini not only failed to negotiate in good faith "but even treated Paternus himself shamefully, thereby bringing about their own destruction later." Anthony Birley dates this event to the year 171. Following the emperor's victory over the Marcomanni and the Quadi the following year, Marcus Aurelius waged a punitive action against the Cotini. Paternus must have distinguished himself in this fighting, for he is attested as having received consular ornaments.

Paternus is next documented as one of the witnesses to the Tabula Banasitana, a bronze tablet dated to 6 July 177, which records the grant of Roman citizenship to a family in Mauretania Tingitana. The witnesses are drawn from the Imperial amici or senior courtiers, who include consular senators such as Marcus Gavius Squilla Gallicanus, Manius Acilius Glabrio Gnaeus Cornelius Severus, and Titus Sextius Lateranus; senior eques such as the former praetorian prefect Marcus Bassaeus Rufus, the current pretorian prefect Sextus Tigidius Perennis, praefectus vigilum Quintus Cervidius Scaevola, and praefectus annonae Titus Flavius Piso—as well as Tarrutenius Paternus.

By the time of Marcus Aurelius' death in 180, Paternus had been appointed praetorian prefect, serving as the colleague of Bassaeus Rufus. A few years later he was executed on the orders of the new emperor Commodus. The primary sources contradict each other about Paternus' fall: Dio Cassius claims Paternus was innocent of any treasonous act towards Commodus, stating that "if he had plotted against Commodus, as he was accused of doing, could easily have killed him while he himself was still in command of the Pretorians; but he had not done so." On the other hand, the Historia Augusta claims that Paternus provided advice to Marcus Ummidius Quadratus Annianus and Lucilla, Commodus' sister, in their unsuccessful plot to kill Commodus. When the plot was uncovered, Paternus managed to evade being caught up in the executions that followed. However, when Commodus' freedman Saoterus was killed by members of the Praetorian Guard, who blamed him for Commodus' unpopularity with the populace, Tigidius Perennis managed to portray Paternus as the instigator of the crime. As a result, Paternus, Salvius Julianus, whose son was betrothed to Paternus' daughter, and Paternus' friend the current ab epistulis Latinis Vitruvius Secundus were also executed. Anthony Birley is inclined to accept the account of the Historia Augusta over that of Cassius Dio, noting that Salvius Julianus' kinsman Didius Julianus, who was governor of Germania Inferior at the time, was accused with being complicit with Salvius in treason against Commodus, but managed to clear himself and was allowed to withdraw to his native Milan.

== Writings ==
Paternus was known to have written on Roman Law, but little is known about those works or their contents. Extracts from the work appear in Justinian's Digest; Aemilius Macer and Vegetius call him "diligentissimus juris militaris adsertor." A literary work in four books attributed to him has survived with the title De re militari; however, it was probably written by an anonymous writer under his name.
