= Maternus (rebel) =

Roman rebel during the reign of Commodus

Maternus was a former soldier of the Roman Empire who rebelled during the reign of Commodus.

In around 186, Maternus deserted from the army in Gaul, persuading many others to join him. The rebels sacked villages and later cities in Gaul and Spain while recruiting prisoners to their cause. They eventually dispersed when an enraged Commodus ordered an army to be raised against them. He later infiltrated Rome to attempt to assassinate Commodus at the spring festival of Cybele, but he was betrayed, seized, and beheaded.

There is a play based upon the story of Maternus as told by Herodian.
