= Lucilla =

Roman empress from 164 to 169

- Augusta
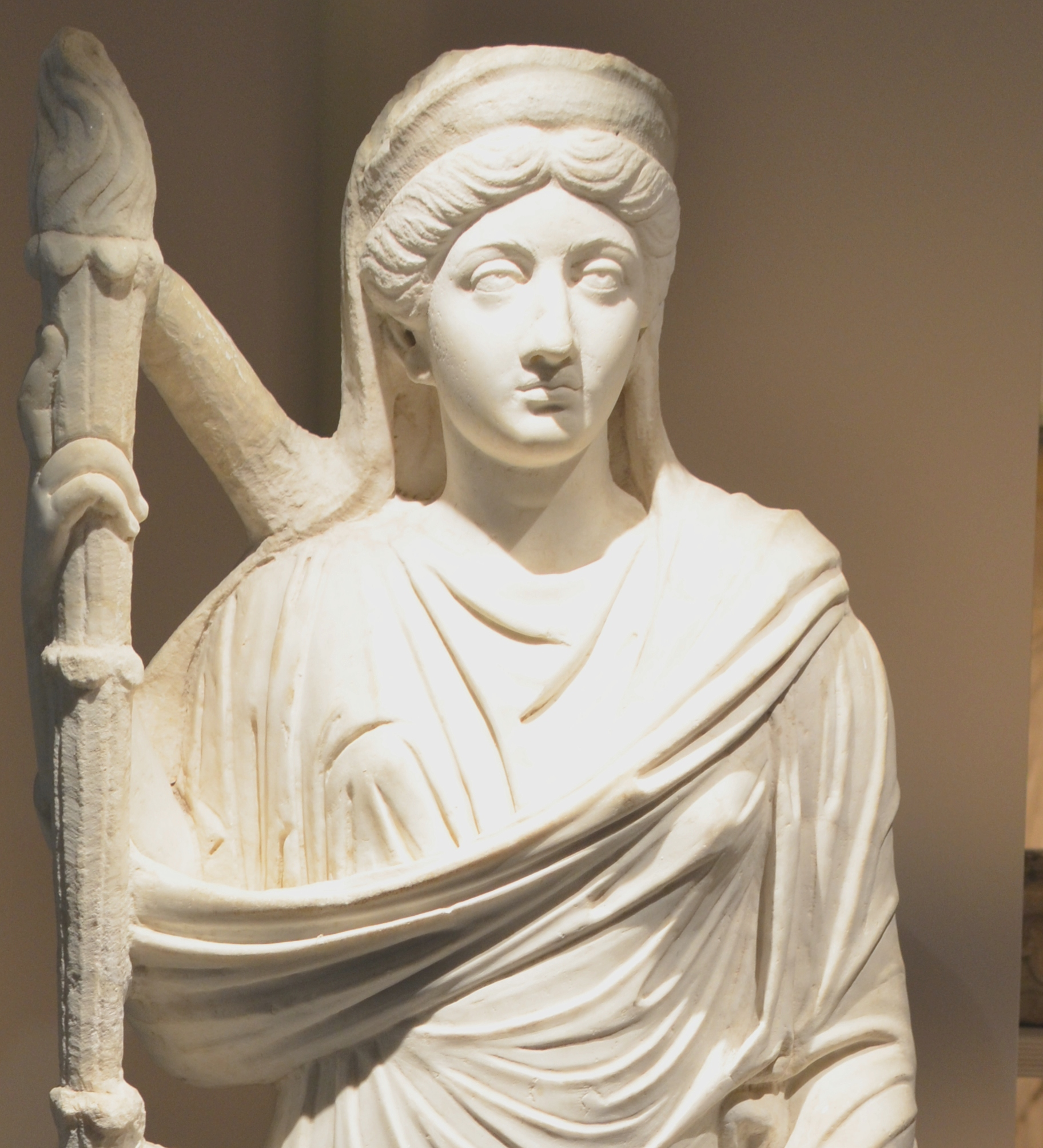
- Marble statue of Lucilla depicted as Ceres, 150–200 AD (Bardo National Museum, Tunisia)

Roman empress
- Tenure: 164 – 169
- Born: 7 March, between 148 and 150; Rome, Italy
- Died: 182 (aged 32–34); Capri, Italy
- Spouse: Lucius Verus (m. 164, died 169) Claudius Pompeianus (m. 169)
- Issue: Aurelia Lucilla; Lucilla Plautia; Lucius Verus; Aurelius Pompeianus
Names
- Annia Aurelia Galeria Lucilla
Regnal name
- Annia Aurelia Galeria Lucilla Augusta
- House: Nerva–Antonine Dynasty
- Father: Marcus Aurelius
- Mother: Faustina the Younger

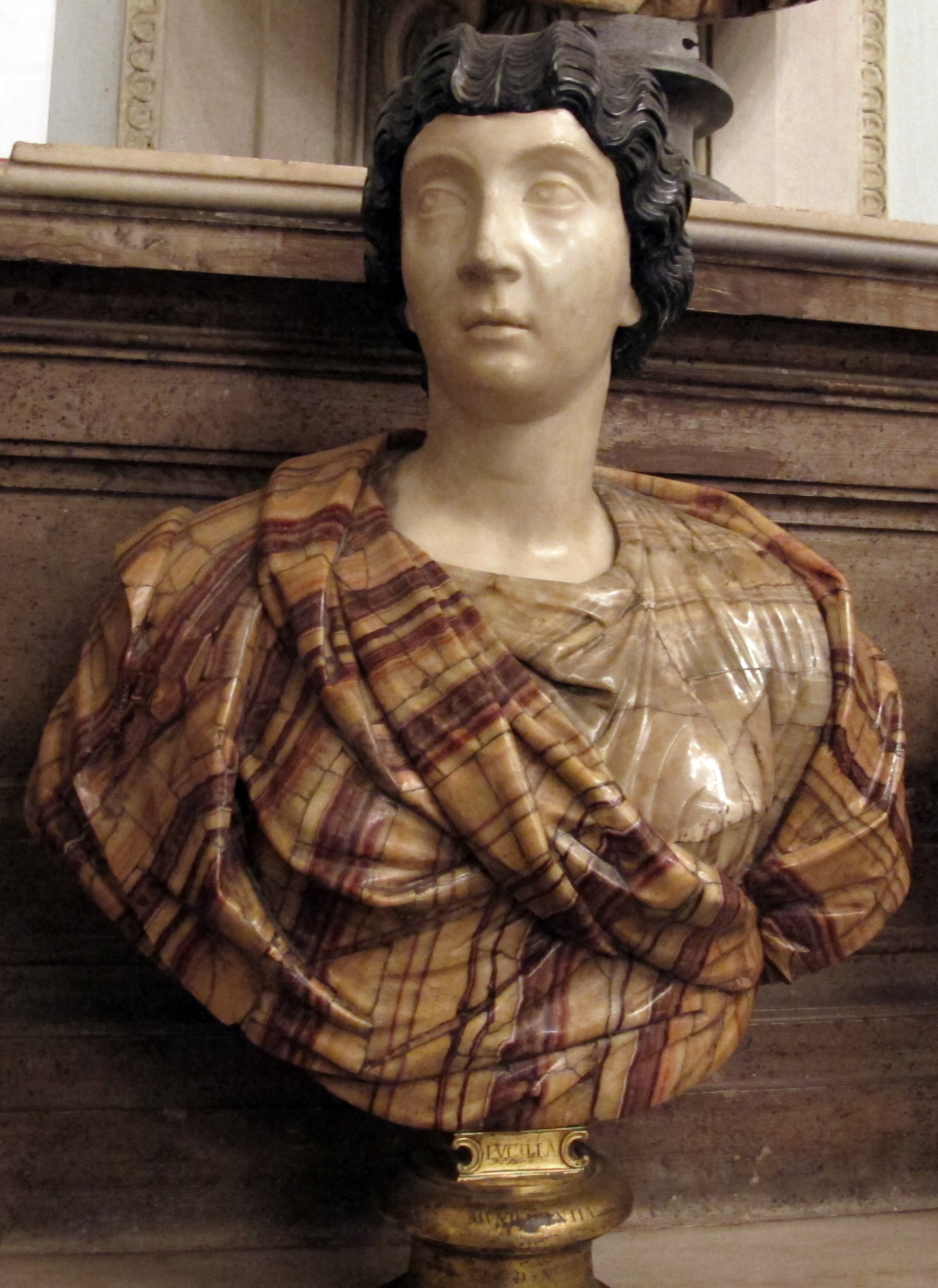
A female bust, possibly depicting Lucilla, 160-180 AD

Annia Aurelia Galeria Lucilla or Lucilla (7 March 148 or 150 – 182) was the second daughter of Roman emperor Marcus Aurelius and Roman empress Faustina the Younger. She was the wife of her father's co-ruler and adoptive brother Lucius Verus and an elder sister to later emperor Commodus. Commodus ordered Lucilla's execution after a failed assassination and coup attempt when she was about 33 years old.

== Early life ==
Born and raised in Rome into the empire's ruling family, Lucilla was a younger twin with her elder brother Gemellus Lucillae, who died around 150. Lucilla's maternal grandparents were Roman emperor Antoninus Pius and Roman empress Faustina the Elder and her paternal grandparents were Domitia Lucilla and praetor Marcus Annius Verus.

== Marriages and ascension to Empress ==
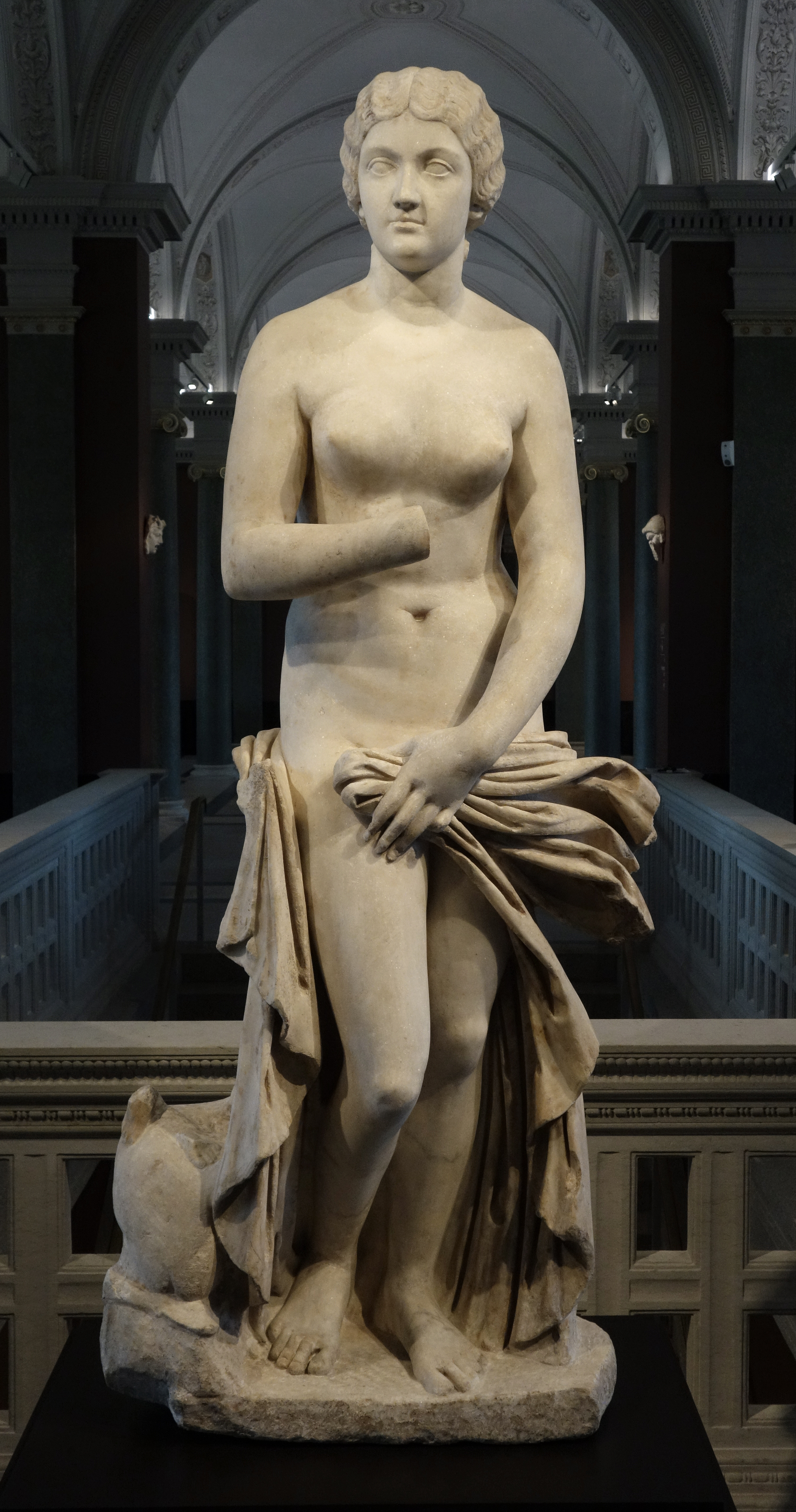
Statue of Lucilla depicted as Venus (Skulpturensammlung, Dresden)

In 161, when she was between 11 and 13 years old, Lucilla's father arranged a marriage for her with his co-ruler Lucius Verus. Verus, 18 years her senior, became her husband three years later in Ephesus in 164. At this marriage, she received her title of Augusta and became a Roman empress. At the same time, Marcus Aurelius and Lucius Verus were fighting a Parthian war in Syria.

Lucilla and Lucius Verus had three children:

- Aurelia Lucilla was born in 165 in Antioch
- Lucilla Plautia
- Lucius Verus

Aurelia and Lucius died young.

Lucilla was an influential and respectable woman and she enjoyed her status. She spent much time in Rome, while Verus was away from Rome much of the time, fulfilling his duties as a co-ruler. Lucius Verus died around 168/169 while returning from the war theater in the Danube region, and as a result, Lucilla lost her status as empress.

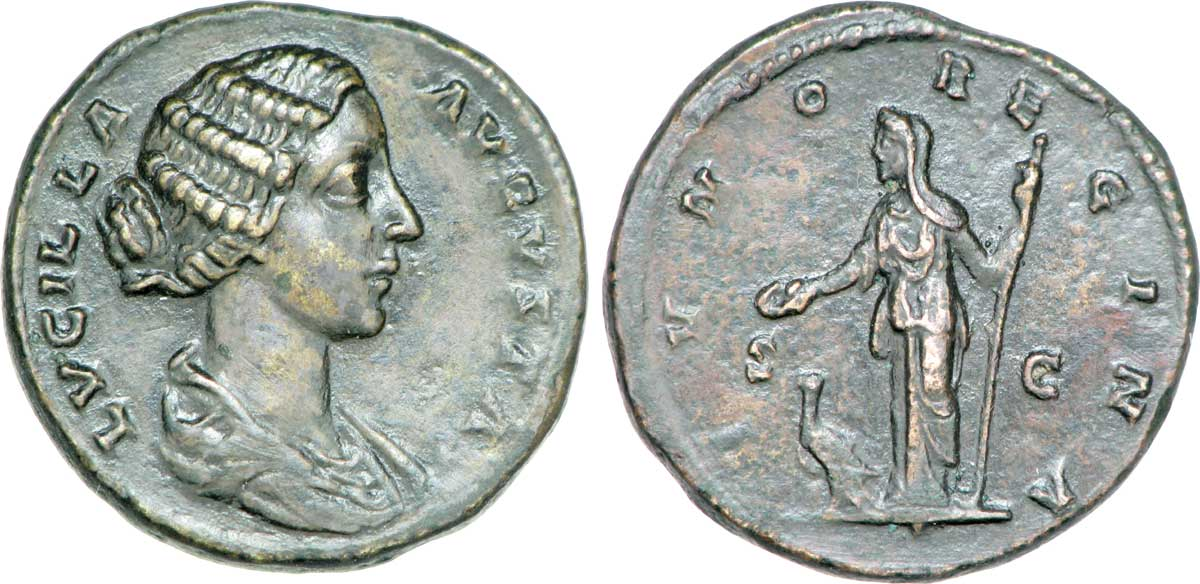
Dupondius depicting Lucilla Augusta (obverse) and Juno Regina with a peacock (reverse)

As an unattached link to Emperor Aurelius and to the late co-emperor Verus and because of her royal-born offspring, Lucilla was not destined for a long widowhood. A short time later, in 169, her father arranged a second marriage for her with Tiberius Claudius Pompeianus Quintianus from Antioch. He was a Syrian Roman who was twice consul and a political ally to her father, but Lucilla and her mother were against the marriage as a less than ideal match, partly because Quintianus was at least twice Lucilla's age, but also because he was not of her own Roman nobilis social rank though he was descended from rulers in the East. They married nonetheless and, about a year later, in 170, had a son named Pompeianus.

== Rise of Commodus ==
In 172, Lucilla and Quintianus accompanied Marcus Aurelius to Vindobona (now Vienna) in support of the Danube military campaign and were with him on 17 March 180, when Aurelius died and Commodus became the new emperor. The change ended any hope of Lucilla becoming empress again and she and Quintianus returned to Rome.

Lucilla was not happy living the quiet life of a private citizen in Rome, and hated her sister-in-law Bruttia Crispina. Over time, Lucilla became very concerned with her brother Commodus' erratic behaviour and its resulting effect on the stability of the empire.

== Plot to assassinate Commodus ==
In light of her brother's unstable rule, in 182 Lucilla became involved in a plot to assassinate Commodus and replace him with her husband and herself as the new rulers of Rome. Her co-conspirators included Publius Tarrutenius Paternus the Praetorian prefect, her daughter Plautia from her first marriage, a nephew of Quintianus also called Quintianus, and her paternal cousins, the former consul Marcus Ummidius Quadratus Annianus and his sister Ummidia Cornificia Faustina.

Quintianus' nephew, brandishing a dagger or sword, bungled the assassination attempt. As he burst forth from his hiding place to commit the deed, he boasted to Commodus "Here is what the Senate sends to you", giving away his intentions before he had the chance to act. Commodus's guards were faster than Quintianus and the would-be assassin was overpowered and disarmed without injuring the emperor.

Commodus ordered the deaths of Quintianus' nephew and of Marcus Ummidius Quadratus Annianus, and banished Lucilla, her daughter, and Ummidia Cornificia Faustina to the Italian island of Capri. He sent a centurion there to execute them later that year. Her son Pompeianus was later murdered by Caracalla.

== In popular culture ==
- In the 1964 film The Fall of the Roman Empire, Lucilla is played by Sophia Loren, her part in the film's plot bearing only a very loose relation to Lucilla's real life.
- In the 2000 film Gladiator and its 2024 sequel, Lucilla is played by Connie Nielsen.
- In the 2016 six-part docuseries Roman Empire: Reign of Blood, Lucilla is played by Tai Berdinner-Blades.

== Nerva–Antonine family tree ==
Nerva–Antonine family tree

Q. Marcius Barea Soranus | Q. Marcius Barea Sura | Antonia Furnilla | M. Cocceius Nerva | Sergia Plautilla | P. Aelius Hadrianus
Titus (r. 79–81) | Marcia Furnilla | Marcia | Trajanus Pater | Nerva (r. 96–98) | Ulpia (Note: Sister of Trajan's father: Giacosa (1977), p. 7.) | Aelius Hadrianus Marullinus
Flavia (Note: Giacosa (1977), p. 8.) | Marciana (Note: Levick (2014), p. 161.) | C. Salonius Matidius (Note: Husband of Ulpia Marciana: Levick (2014), p. 161.) | Trajan (r. 98–117) | Plotina | P. Acilius Attianus | P. Aelius Afer (Note: Giacosa (1977), p. 7.) | Paulina Major (Note: DIR contributor (Herbert W. Benario, 2000), "Hadrian".)
Lucius Mindius (2) | Libo Rupilius Frugi (3) | Salonia Matidia (Note: Giacosa (1977), p. 9.) | L. Vibius Sabinus (1) (Note: Husband of Salonia Matidia: Levick (2014), p. 161.)
Paulina Minor | L. Julius Ursus Servianus (Note: Smith (1870), "Julius Servianus".)
Matidia Minor | Sabina | Hadrian (Note: Smith (1870), "Hadrian", pp. 319–322.) (r. 117–138) | Antinous (Note: Lover of Hadrian: Lambert (1984), p. 99 and passim; deification: Lambert (1984), pp. 2–5, etc.)
C. Fuscus Salinator I | Julia Serviana Paulina
M. Annius Verus (Note: Husband of Rupilia Faustina: Levick (2014), p. 163.) | Rupilia Faustina (Note: Levick (2014), p. 163.) (Note: It is uncertain whether Rupilia Faustina was Frugi's daughter by Salonia Matidia or another woman.) | Boionia Procilla | Cn. Arrius Antoninus
L. Ceionius Commodus | Appia Severa | C. Fuscus Salinator II
L. Caesennius Paetus | Arria Antonina | Arria Fadilla (Note: Levick (2014), p. 162.) | T. Aurelius Fulvus
L. Caesennius Antoninus | L. Commodus | Plautia | unknown (Note: Levick (2014), p. 164.) | C. Avidius Nigrinus
M. Annius Verus | Calvisia Domitia Lucilla (Note: Wife of M. Annius Verus: Giacosa (1977), p. 10.) | Fundania (Note: Wife of M. Annius Libo: Levick (2014), p. 163.) | M. Annius Libo | Faustina | Antoninus Pius (r. 138–161) | L. Aelius Caesar | Avidia
Cornificia | Marcus Aurelius (r. 161–180) (Note: Giacosa (1977), p. 10.) | Faustina Minor | Aurelia Fadilla | Lucius Verus (r. 161–169) (1) | Ceionia Fabia | Plautius Quintillus (Note: Husband of Ceionia Fabia: Levick (2014), p. 164.) | Q. Servilius Pudens | Ceionia Plautia
Cornificia Minor (Note: Levick (2014), p. 117.) | M. Petronius Sura | Commodus (r. 177–192) | Fadilla | M. Annius Verus Caesar | Ti. Claudius Pompeianus (2) | Lucilla | M. Plautius Quintillus | Junius Licinius Balbus | Servilia Ceionia
Petronius Antoninus | L. Aurelius Agaclytus (2) | Aurelia Sabina | L. Antistius Burrus (1) | Plautius Quintillus | Plautia Servilla | C. Furius Sabinus Timesitheus | Maecia Faustina | Junius Licinius Balbus?
Furia Sabinia Tranquillina | Gordian III (r. 238–244)

- (1) = 1st spouse
- (2) = 2nd spouse
- (3) = 3rd spouse
- Reddish-purple indicates emperor of the Nerva–Antonine dynasty
  lighter purple indicates designated imperial heir of said dynasty who never reigned
  grey indicates unsuccessful imperial aspirants
  bluish-purple indicates emperors of other dynasties
- dashed lines indicate adoption; dotted lines indicate love affairs/unmarried relationships
- Small Caps = posthumously deified (Augusti, Augustae, or other)

Notes:

Except where otherwise noted, the notes below indicate that an individual's parentage is as shown in the above family tree.

References:
- DIR contributors (2000). "De Imperatoribus Romanis: An Online Encyclopedia of Roman Rulers and Their Families".
- Giacosa, Giorgio (1977). Women of the Caesars: Their Lives and Portraits on Coins. Translated by Holloway, R. Ross. Milan: Edizioni Arte e Moneta. ISBN 0-8390-0193-2.
- Lambert, Royston (1984). Beloved and God: The Story of Hadrian and Antinous. New York: Viking. ISBN 0-670-15708-2.
- Levick, Barbara (2014). Faustina I and II: Imperial Women of the Golden Age. Oxford University Press. ISBN 978-0-19-537941-9.
- Smith, William, ed. (1870). Dictionary of Greek and Roman Biography and Mythology.
