= Saoterus =

Emperor Commodus's palace chamberlain (died 182)

Saoterus (Greek: Σαώτερος ὁ Νικομηδεύς; died 182) was a Bithynian Greek freedman from Nicomedia who served as the Roman Emperor Commodus's palace chamberlain (a cubiculo). His career is sketched by Herodian, Dio Cassius and the Historia Augusta. Commodus preferred to exercise his rule through palace officials and Saoterus was the first of these; Saoterus was seen as in the Emperor's favour at the outset of his reign, as he accompanied Commodus in his chariot when he made his ceremonial entry into Rome on 22 October 180. Commodus placed him in a high position in his government, resulting in resentment from noble senatorial families. The Historia Augusta, apparently drawing on the testimony of Marius Maximus, insinuates that Commodus had a homosexual infatuation with Saoterus. After the attempt on Commodus's life in 182, Saoterus was implicated in the plot by the praetorian prefect Tigidius Perennis, and was murdered by the freedman Cleander, who succeeded him as chamberlain.
