= Sextus Tigidius Perennis =

Praetorian prefect to Roman emperor Commodus (died 185)

- Died: 185; Rome
- Military career
- Allegiance: Roman Empire
- Service years: ??–185
- Rank: Praetorian prefect
- Commands: Praetorian Guard

Sextus Tigidius Perennis (died 185) served as Praetorian Prefect under the Roman emperor Commodus. Perennis exercised an outsized influence over Commodus and was the effective ruler of the Roman Empire. In 185, Perennis was implicated in a plot to overthrow the emperor by his political rival, Marcus Aurelius Cleander, and executed on the orders of Commodus.

== Sources ==
Herodian, Cassius Dio, and the Augustan History provide conflicting accounts of the rise and fall of Perennis, but all three agree on the essential points of his powerful position under Commodus and his swift execution in 185. His name also appears among the signatories on the Tabula Banasitana, dated to 177.

== Rise to power ==
Perennis perhaps served as praefectus annonae during the reign of Marcus Aurelius. The precise date of his elevation to Praetorian Prefect is uncertain. Herodian's account indicates that he did not assume the post until the accession of Commodus, but it is possible that he served as the junior partner of Publius Tarrutenius Paternus as early as 177. Paternus was alleged to have displeased Commodus by ordering the death of the emperor's lover and friend Saoterus for his questionable involvement in an assassination plot headed by Lucilla and Marcus Ummidius Quadratus Annianus. Whatever the extent of his involvement in the removal of Paternus, Perennis thenceforth wielded enormous power as the lone prefect.

== Career under Commodus ==
Herodian describes how Perennis capitalized on Commodus's distrust of the Roman Senate (following the aforementioned assassination attempt to which the Senate was linked) by destroying many powerful Senators and claiming their wealth as his own. So too was Perennis thought to have held ambitions of military power: soldiers were given lavish gifts in an attempt to seduce them to his cause, and his sons were appointed to commanding army roles. The Augustan History suggests Perennis also persuaded Commodus to allow him political control, freeing the Emperor for his more hedonistic personal pursuits.

== Downfall ==
Herodian wrote that Perennis began to plot against Commodus. Gifts from his newly acquired fortune were to curry favor with the army and his sons were secretly recruiting additional forces in anticipation of the coming revolt. Before they could act, however, the plot was exposed. First, during a public festival honoring Capitoline Jupiter, an unknown person took the stage before the performers and warned the emperor and the assembled crowd of Perennis' plans. He wasn't believed, and Perennis had him executed. Later, a group of soldiers came to Commodus and relayed the details of the plot, and showed him coins with Perennis' portrait that they had stolen from one of prefect's sons. The emperor had him and his sons executed. Also instrumental in Perennis' downfall was Marcus Aurelius Cleander, who would go on to fulfill a similar role in the next period of Commodus's reign.
