= Commodus =

Roman emperor from 177 to 192

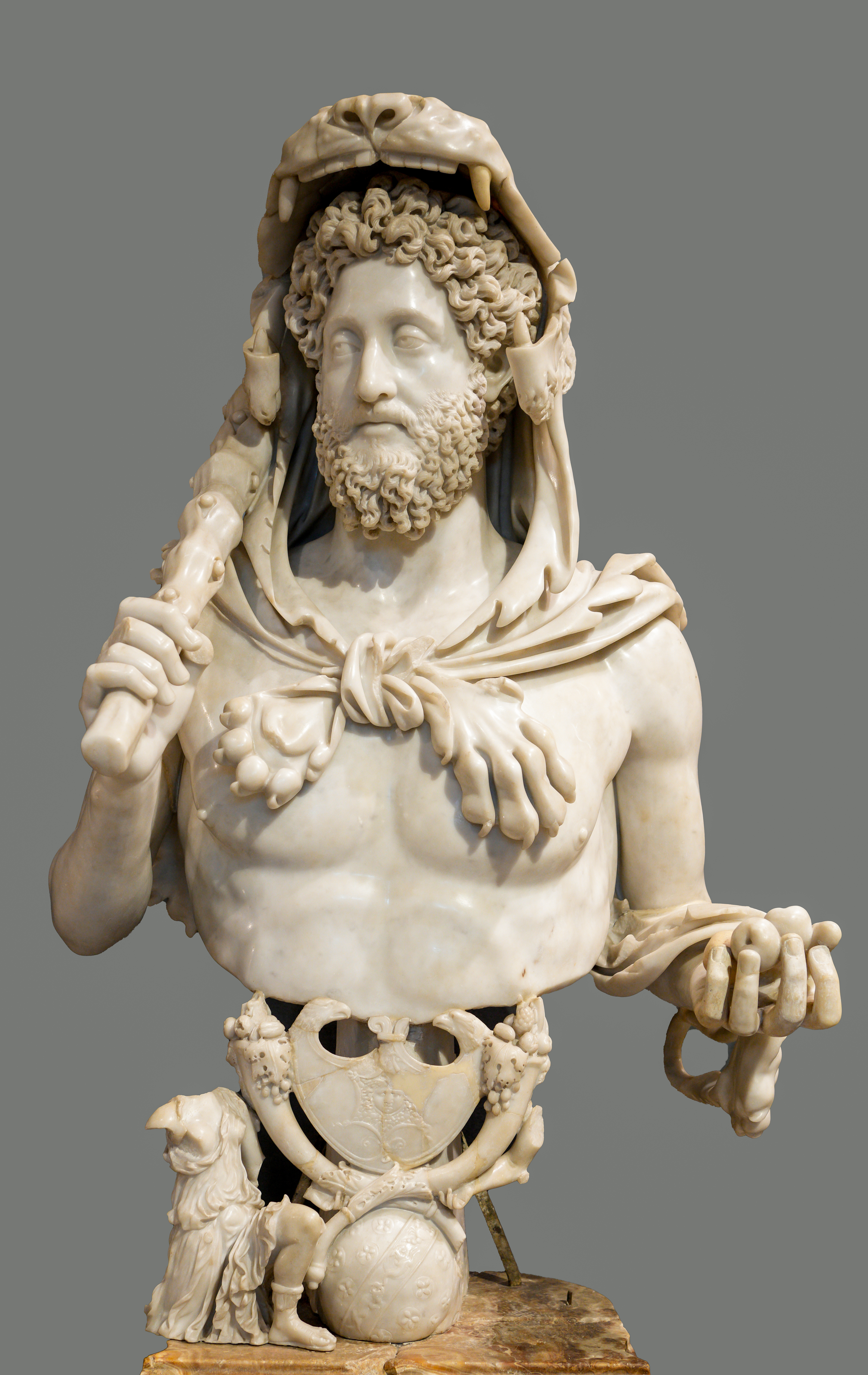
- Commodus as Hercules (AD 192), Capitoline Museums, Rome, one of the most famous Roman sculptures.

Roman emperor
- Reign: early 177 – 31 December 192 (senior from 17 March 180)
- Predecessor: Marcus Aurelius
- Successor: Pertinax
- Co-emperor: Marcus Aurelius (177–180)
- Born: 31 August 161; Lanuvium, near Rome, Roman Italy
- Died: 31 December 192 (aged 31); Rome, Italy
- Burial: Hadrian's Mausoleum
- Spouse: Bruttia Crispina
Names
- Lucius Aelius Aurelius Commodus; Marcus Aurelius Commodus Antoninus
- Dynasty: Nerva–Antonine
- Father: Marcus Aurelius
- Mother: Faustina the Younger

Commodus (/ˈkɒmədəs/; Latin: [ˈkɔmmɔdʊs]; 31 August 161 – 31 December 192) was Roman emperor from 177 to 192, first serving as nominal co-emperor under his father Marcus Aurelius and then ruling alone from 180. Commodus's sole reign is commonly thought to mark the end of the Pax Romana, a golden age of peace and prosperity in the history of the Roman Empire.

Commodus accompanied his father during the Marcomannic Wars in 172 and on a tour of the Eastern provinces in 176. The following year, he became the youngest emperor and consul up to that point, at the age of 16. His sole reign saw less military conflict than that of Marcus Aurelius, but internal intrigues and conspiracies abounded, goading Commodus to an increasingly dictatorial style of leadership. This culminated in his creating a deific personality cult, including his performances as a gladiator in the Colosseum. Throughout his reign, Commodus entrusted the management of affairs to his palace chamberlain and praetorian prefects, namely Saoterus, Perennis, and Cleander.

Commodus was assassinated by the wrestler Narcissus in 192, ending the Nerva–Antonine dynasty. He was succeeded by Pertinax, the first claimant in the tumultuous Year of the Five Emperors.

== Early life and rise to power (161–180) ==
Lucius Aelius Aurelius Commodus was born on 31 August 161 in Lanuvium, near Rome. He was the son of the reigning emperor, Marcus Aurelius, and Aurelius' first cousin, Faustina the Younger, the youngest daughter of Emperor Antoninus Pius, who had died only a few months before. Commodus had a twin brother, Titus Aurelius Fulvus Antoninus, who died in 165. On 12 October 166, Commodus was made caesar together with his younger brother, Marcus Annius Verus. The latter died in 169 having failed to recover from an operation, which left Commodus as Marcus Aurelius's sole surviving son.

He was looked after by his father's physician, Galen, who treated many of Commodus's common illnesses. Commodus received extensive tutoring from a multitude of teachers with a focus on intellectual education. Among his teachers, Onesicrates, Antistius Capella, Titus Aius Sanctus, and Pitholaus are mentioned.

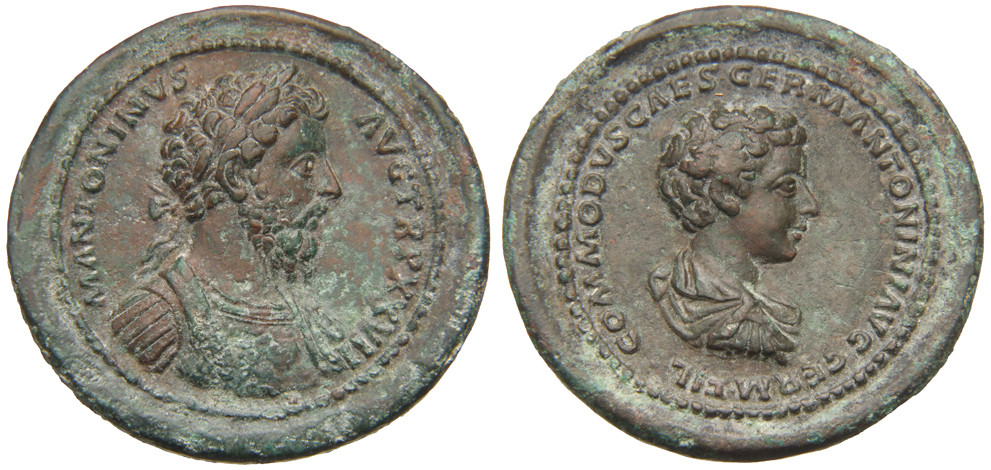
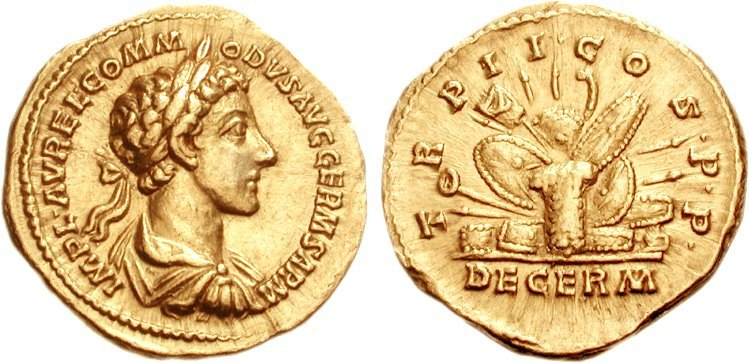
Left: Medallion depicting the caesar Commodus (right) with his father Marcus (left), AD 172
Right: Aureus of Commodus as co-augustus, AD 177

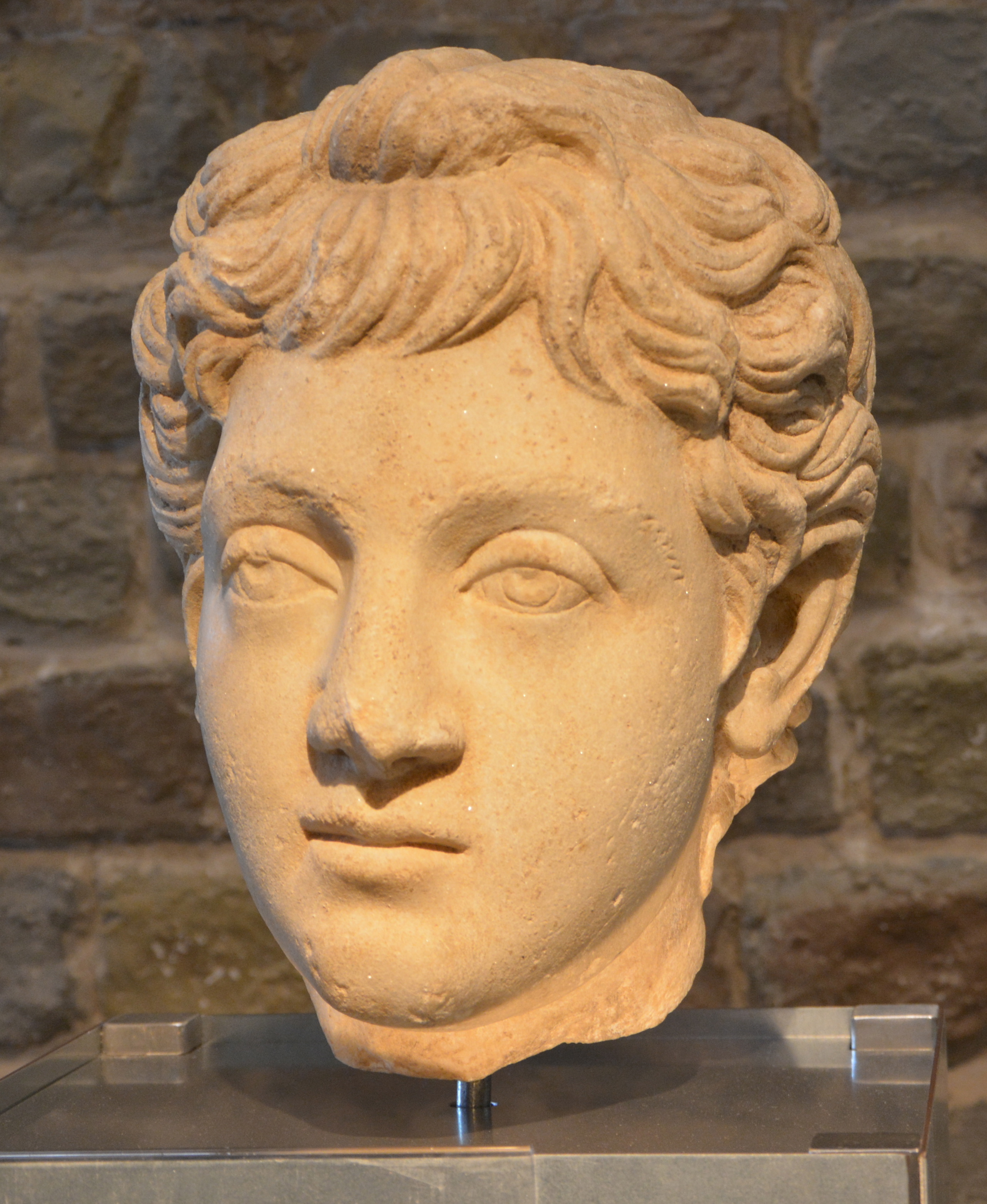
Commodus c. 170–175 AD, Romano-Germanic Museum.

Commodus is known to have been at Carnuntum, the headquarters of Marcus Aurelius during the Marcomannic Wars, in 172. It is presumed that there, on 15 October 172, he was given the victory title Germanicus, in the presence of the army. The title suggests Commodus was present at his father's victory over the Marcomanni. On 20 January 175, Commodus entered the College of Pontiffs, the starting point of a career in public life.

In 175, Avidius Cassius, Governor of Syria, declared himself emperor following rumours that Marcus Aurelius had died. Having been accepted as emperor by Syria, Palestina and Egypt, Cassius carried on his rebellion even after it had become obvious Marcus was still alive. During the preparations for the campaign against Cassius, Commodus assumed his toga virilis on the Danubian front on 7 July 175, thus formally entering adulthood. Cassius, however, was killed by one of his centurions before the campaign against him could begin. Commodus subsequently accompanied his father on a lengthy trip to the Eastern provinces, during which he visited Antioch. The Emperor and his son then travelled to Athens, where they were initiated into the Eleusinian Mysteries. They then returned to Rome in the autumn of 176.

Marcus Aurelius was the first emperor since Vespasian to have a legitimate biological son, though he himself was the fifth in the line of the so-called Five Good Emperors, also known as the Adoptive Emperors, each of whom had adopted his successor. Commodus was the first (and until 337, the only) emperor "born in the purple," meaning during his father's reign.

On 27 November 176, Marcus Aurelius bestowed the title of Imperator on Commodus. Modern authors often use this date as the beginning of his reign, but the exact chronology of events is uncertain. Commodus is first mentioned as Augustus (emperor) on 17 June 177, but he reckoned his reign back to his salutation in 176. For instance, he assumed the tribunicia potestas (tribunician power) around February 177, but in April 177 he started to backdate this event to November 176.

On 23 December 176, the two imperatores celebrated a joint triumph. On 1 January 177, Commodus became consul for the first time, which made him, aged 15, the youngest consul up to that time (the minimum age for the consulship was around 30). He subsequently married Bruttia Crispina before accompanying his father to the Danubian front once more in 178. Marcus Aurelius died there on 17 March 180, leaving the 18-year-old Commodus as sole emperor.

== Sole reign (180–192) ==
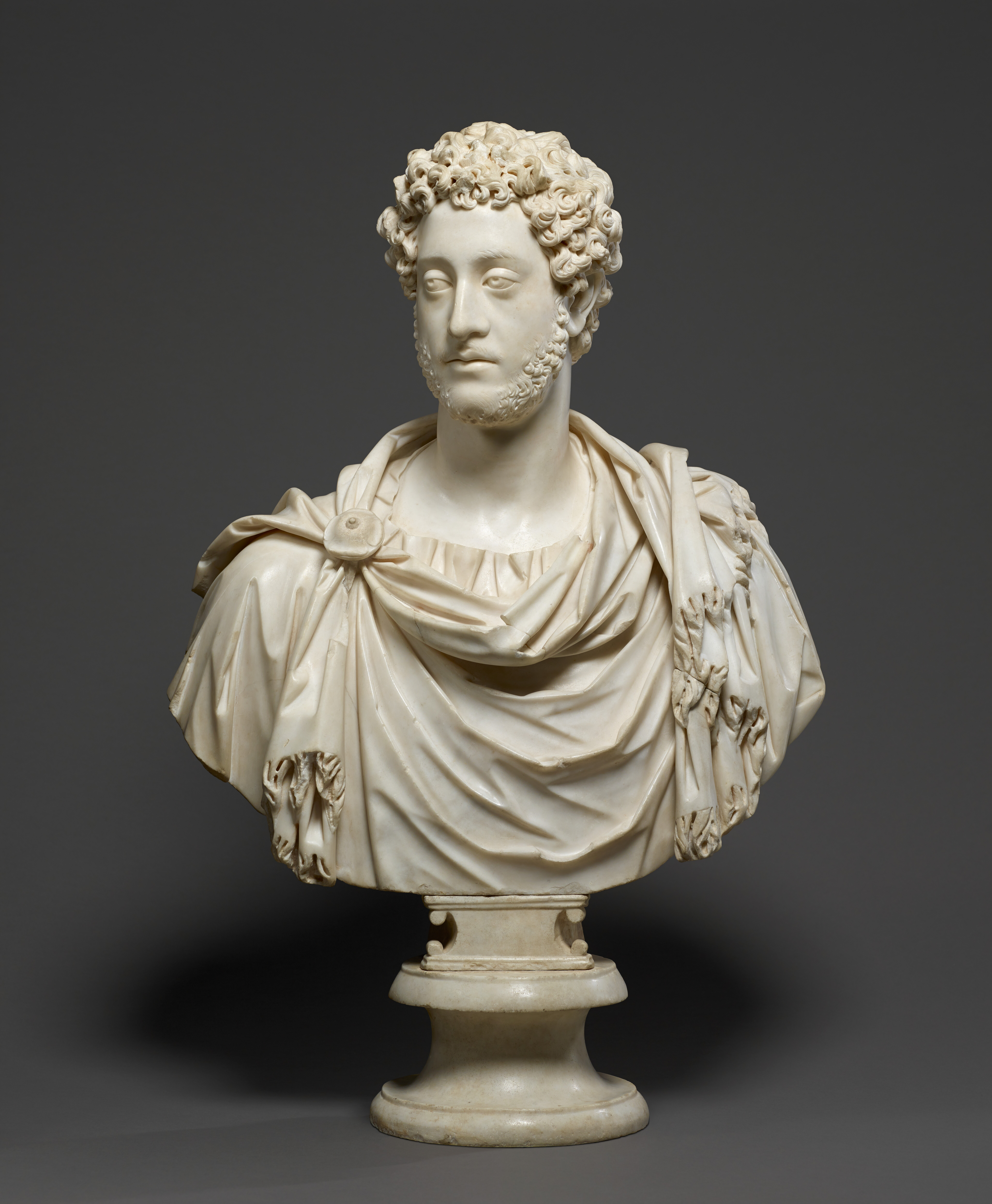
Commodus c. 180 AD, Getty Museum.

Upon his ascension, Commodus devalued the Roman currency. He reduced the weight of the denarius from 96 per Roman pound to 105 per Roman pound (3.85 grams to 3.35 grams). He also reduced the silver purity from 79 percent to 76 percent – the silver weight dropping from 2.57 grams to 2.34 grams. In 186, he further reduced the purity and silver weight to 74 percent and 2.22 grams respectively, being 108 to the Roman pound. His reduction of the denarius during his rule was the largest since the empire's first devaluation during Nero's reign.

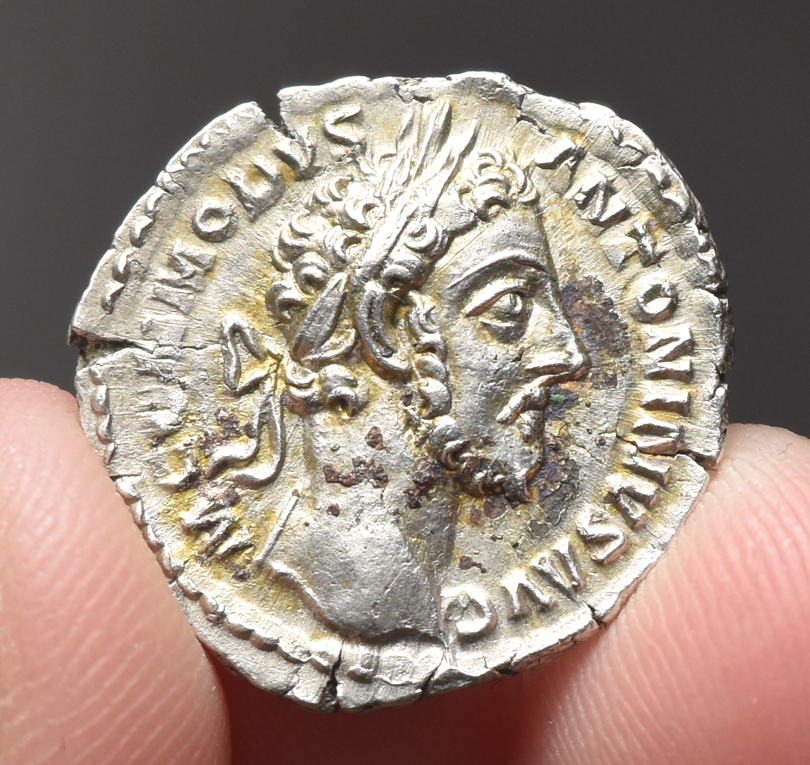
The obverse image of a silver denarius depicting Roman Emperor Commodus (177–192)

Whereas the reign of Marcus Aurelius had been marked by almost continuous warfare, Commodus's rule was comparatively peaceful in the military sense, but was also characterised by political strife and the increasingly arbitrary and capricious behaviour of the emperor himself. In the view of Cassius Dio, his accession marked the descent "from a kingdom of gold to one of iron and rust".

Despite his notoriety, and considering the importance of his reign, Commodus's years in power are not well chronicled. The principal surviving literary sources are Herodian, Cassius Dio (a contemporary and sometimes first-hand observer and Senator during Commodus's reign, whose reports for this period survive only as fragments and abbreviations), and the Historia Augusta (untrustworthy because of its character as a work of literature rather than of history, with elements of fiction embedded within its biographies; in the case of Commodus, it probably embroiders what the author found in reasonably good contemporary sources).

Commodus remained with the Danube armies for only a short time before negotiating a peace treaty with the Danubian tribes. He then returned to Rome and celebrated a triumph for the conclusion of the wars on 22 October 180. Unlike the preceding emperors Trajan, Hadrian, Antoninus Pius, and Marcus Aurelius, he seems to have had little interest in the business of administration. He tended throughout his reign to leave the practical running of the state to a succession of favourites, beginning with Saoterus, a freedman from Nicomedia who had become his chamberlain.

Dissatisfaction with this state of affairs led to a series of conspiracies and attempted coups, which in turn eventually provoked Commodus to take charge of affairs, which he did in an increasingly dictatorial manner. Nevertheless, though the senatorial order came to hate and fear him, the evidence suggests he remained popular with the army and the common people for much of his reign, not least because of his lavish shows of largesse (recorded on his coinage) and because he staged and took part in spectacular gladiatorial combats. He was not an inspired combatant. He killed animals by bow, standing above the arena. When he fought fellow gladiators, they would purposely submit. During this period Rome's economy declined.

One of the ways he paid for his donatives (imperial handouts) and mass entertainments was to tax the senatorial order. On many inscriptions, the traditional order of the two nominal powers of the state, the Senate and People (Senatus Populusque Romanus) was provocatively reversed (Populus Senatusque...).

=== Conspiracies of 182 ===
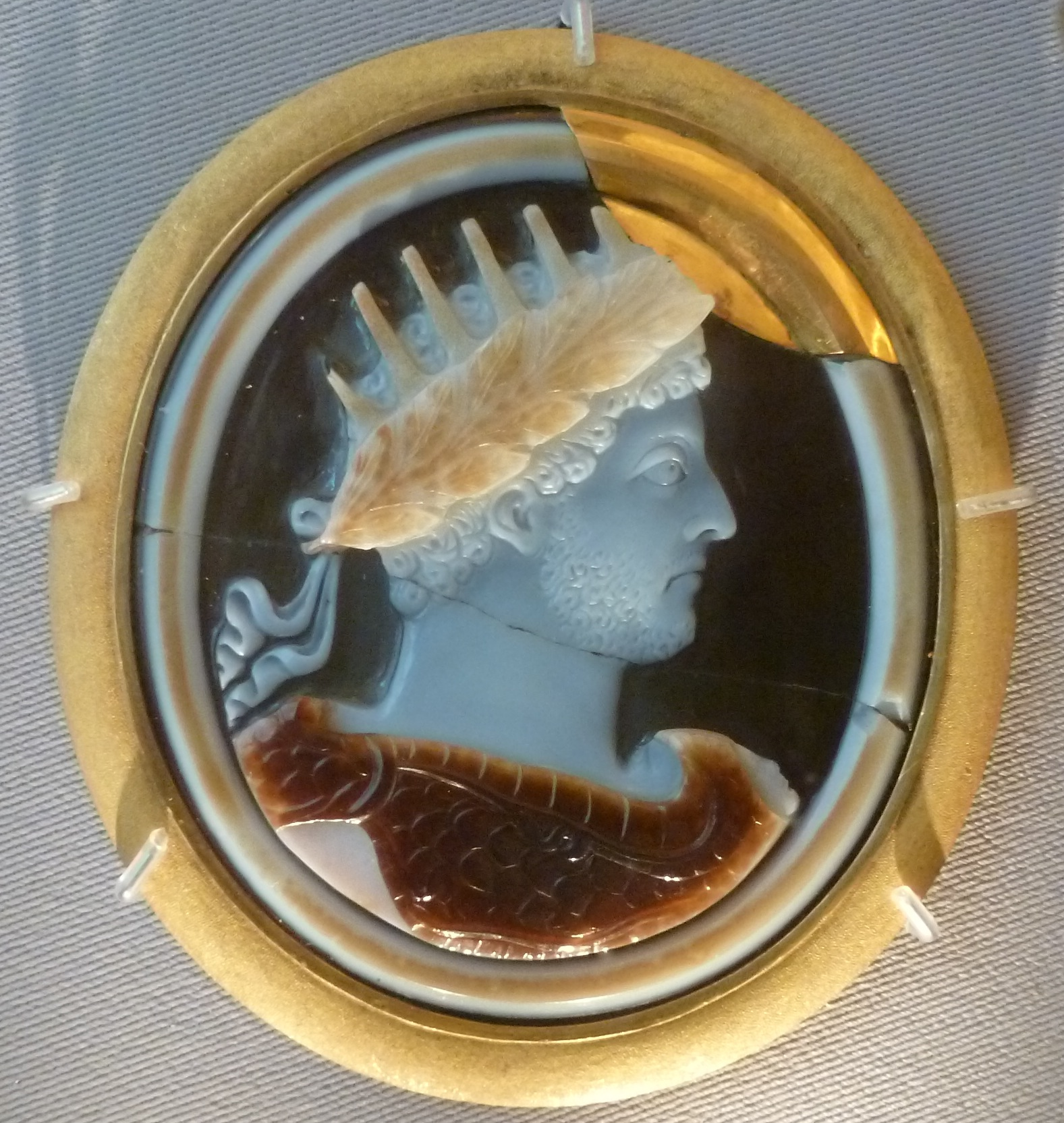
Commodus with attributes of Helios, Apollo, and Jupiter, late 2nd century AD, sardonyx cameo relief, Hermitage Museum, St. Petersburg

At the outset of his reign, Commodus, aged 18, inherited many of his father's senior advisers, notably Tiberius Claudius Pompeianus (the second husband of Commodus's eldest sister Lucilla), his father-in-law Gaius Bruttius Praesens, Titus Fundanius Vitrasius Pollio, and Aufidius Victorinus the Prefect of the City of Rome. He also had four surviving sisters, all of them with husbands who were potential rivals. Lucilla was over ten years his senior and held the rank of Augusta as the widow of her first husband, Lucius Verus.

The first crisis of the reign came in 182, when Lucilla engineered a conspiracy against her brother. Her motive is alleged to have been the envy of the Empress Crispina. Lucilla's husband, Pompeianus, was not involved, but two men alleged to have been her lovers, Marcus Ummidius Quadratus Annianus (the consul of 167, also her first cousin) and Appius Claudius Quintianus, attempted to murder Commodus as he entered a theater. They failed to kill him and were seized by the emperor's bodyguard.

Quadratus and Quintianus were executed. Lucilla was exiled to Capri and later killed. Pompeianus retired from public life. One of the two praetorian prefects, Publius Tarrutenius Paternus, had actually been involved in the conspiracy but his involvement was not discovered until later. In the meantime, he and his colleague, Sextus Tigidius Perennis, were able to arrange for the murder of Saoterus, the hated chamberlain.

Commodus took the loss of Saoterus badly, and Perennis now seized the chance to advance himself by implicating Paternus in a second conspiracy, one apparently led by Publius Salvius Julianus, the son of the jurist Salvius Julianus and betrothed to Paternus' daughter. Salvius and Paternus were executed along with a number of other prominent consulars and senators. Didius Julianus, the future emperor and a relative of Salvius Julianus, was dismissed from the governorship of Germania Inferior.

==== Cleander ====
After the murder of the powerful Saoterus, Perennis took over the reins of government and Commodus found a new chamberlain and favourite in Cleander, a Phrygian freedman who had married one of the emperor's mistresses, Demostratia. Cleander was in fact the person who had murdered Saoterus. After these attempts on his life, Commodus spent much of his time outside Rome, mostly on the family estates at Lanuvium. As he was physically strong, his chief interest was sport: he took part in horse racing, chariot racing, and combat with beasts and men, mostly in private but occasionally in public.

=== Dacia and Britain ===
Commodus was inaugurated in 183 as consul with Aufidius Victorinus as colleague and assumed the title Pius. War broke out in Dacia: few details are available, but it appears two future contenders for the throne, Clodius Albinus and Pescennius Niger, both distinguished themselves in the campaign. Also, in Britain in 184, the governor Ulpius Marcellus re-advanced the Roman frontier northward to the Antonine Wall, but the legionaries revolted against his harsh discipline and acclaimed another legate, Priscus, as emperor.

Priscus refused to accept their acclamation, and Perennis had all the legionary legates in Britain cashiered. On 15 October 184, at the Capitoline Games, a Cynic philosopher publicly denounced Perennis before Commodus. The philosopher's tale was considered false and he was immediately put to death. According to Cassius Dio, Perennis, though ruthless and ambitious, was not personally corrupt and was a generally good administrator.

However, the following year a detachment of soldiers from Britain (they had been drafted to Italy to suppress brigands) also denounced Perennis to the emperor as plotting to make his own son emperor (they had been enabled to do so by Cleander, who was seeking to dispose of his rival), and Commodus gave them permission to execute him as well as his wife and sons. The fall of Perennis brought a new spate of executions: Aufidius Victorinus committed suicide. Ulpius Marcellus was replaced as governor of Britain by Pertinax. Brought to Rome and tried for treason, Marcellus narrowly escaped death.

=== Cleander's zenith and fall (185–190) ===
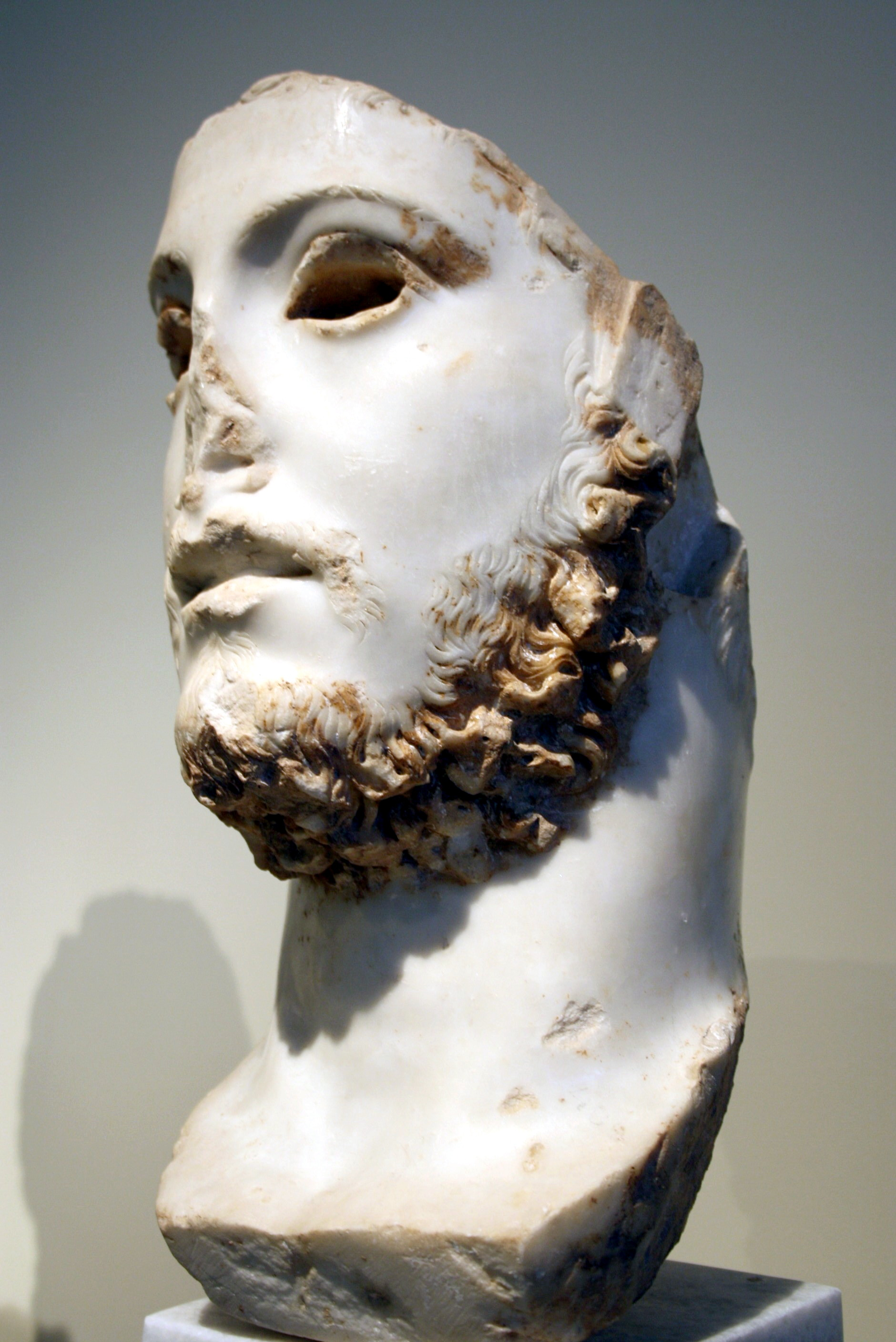
Remnant of a Roman bust of a youth with a blond beard, perhaps Commodus, who is said to have always dyed his hair and used gold dust. National Archaeological Museum, Athens

Cleander proceeded to concentrate power in his own hands and to enrich himself by taking responsibility for all public offices. He sold (and bestowed entry to) Senate seats, army commands, governorships, and increasingly, suffect consulships, to the highest bidder. Unrest rose throughout the empire, with large numbers of army deserters causing trouble in Gaul and Germany. Pescennius Niger dealt with the deserters in Gaul in a military campaign. The revolt in Brittany was put down by two legions brought over from Britain.

In 187, one of the leaders of the deserters, Maternus, came from Gaul intending to assassinate Commodus at the Festival of the Great Goddess in March but was betrayed and executed. In the same year, Pertinax unmasked a conspiracy by two enemies of Cleander, Antistius Burrus (one of Commodus's brothers-in-law) and Arrius Antoninus. As a result, Commodus appeared more rarely in public, preferring to live on his estates.

Early in 188, Cleander disposed of the current praetorian prefect, Atilius Aebutianus, and took over supreme command of the Praetorian Guard with the new title of ā pūgiōne ("in charge of the dagger"), with two praetorian prefects subordinate to him. Now at the zenith of his power, Cleander continued to sell public offices as his private business. The climax came in the year 190, which had 25 suffect consuls—a record in the 1,000-year history of the Roman consulship—all appointed by Cleander (they included the future Emperor Septimius Severus).

In the spring of 190, Rome was afflicted by a food shortage, for which the praefectus annonae Papirius Dionysius, the official actually in charge of the grain supply, contrived to lay the blame on Cleander. At the end of June, a mob demonstrated against Cleander during a horse race in the Circus Maximus: he sent the Praetorian Guard to put down the disturbances, but Pertinax, who was now City Prefect of Rome, dispatched the Vigiles Urbani to oppose them. Cleander fled to Commodus, who was at Laurentum in the house of the Quinctilii, for protection, but the mob followed him calling for his head.

At the urging of his mistress Marcia, Commodus had Cleander beheaded and his son killed. Other victims at this time were the praetorian prefect Julius Julianus, Commodus's cousin Annia Fundania Faustina, and his brother-in-law Mamertinus. Papirius Dionysius was executed, too. In AD 191, Commodus took more of the reins of power, though he continued to rule through a cabal consisting of Marcia, his new chamberlain Eclectus, and the new praetorian prefect Quintus Aemilius Laetus.

=== Megalomania (190–192) ===
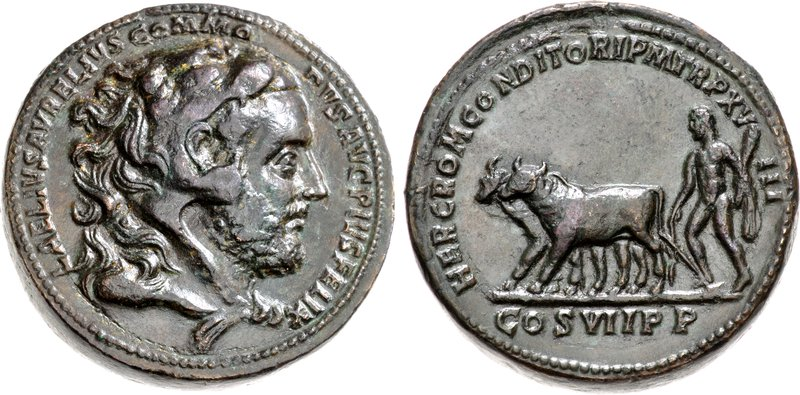
Medallion of Commodus depicting him as Hercules, AD 192.

In opposition to the Senate, in his pronouncements and iconography, Commodus had always stressed his unique status as a source of god-like power, liberality, and physical prowess. Innumerable statues around the empire were set up portraying him in the guise of Hercules, reinforcing the image of him as a demigod, a physical giant, a protector, and a warrior who fought against men and beasts (see § Commodus and Hercules and § Commodus the Gladiator below). Moreover, as Hercules, he could claim to be the son of Jupiter, the supreme god of the Roman pantheon. These tendencies now increased to megalomaniacal proportions. Far from celebrating his descent from Marcus Aurelius, the actual source of his power, he stressed his own personal uniqueness as the bringer of a new order, seeking to re-cast the empire in his own image.

During 191, the city of Rome was extensively damaged by a fire that raged for several days, during which many public buildings including the Temple of Pax, the Temple of Vesta, and parts of the imperial palace were destroyed.

Perhaps seeing this as an opportunity, early in 192 Commodus, declaring himself the new Romulus, ritually re-founded Rome, renaming the city Colonia Lucia Annia Commodiana. All the months of the year were renamed to correspond exactly with his (now twelve) names: Lucius, Aelius, Aurelius, Commodus, Augustus, Herculeus, Romanus, Exsuperatorius, Amazonius, Invictus, Felix, and Pius. The legions were renamed Commodianae, the fleet which imported grain from Africa was termed Alexandria Commodiana Togata, the Senate was entitled the Commodian Fortunate Senate, his palace and the Roman people themselves were all given the name Commodianus, and the day on which these reforms were decreed was to be called Dies Commodianus.

Thus, he presented himself as the fountainhead of the Empire, Roman life, and religion. He also had the head of the Colossus of Nero adjacent to the Colosseum replaced with his own portrait, gave it a club, placed a bronze lion at its feet to make it look like Hercules Romanus, and added an inscription boasting of being "the only left-handed fighter to conquer twelve times one thousand men".

=== Assassination (192) ===
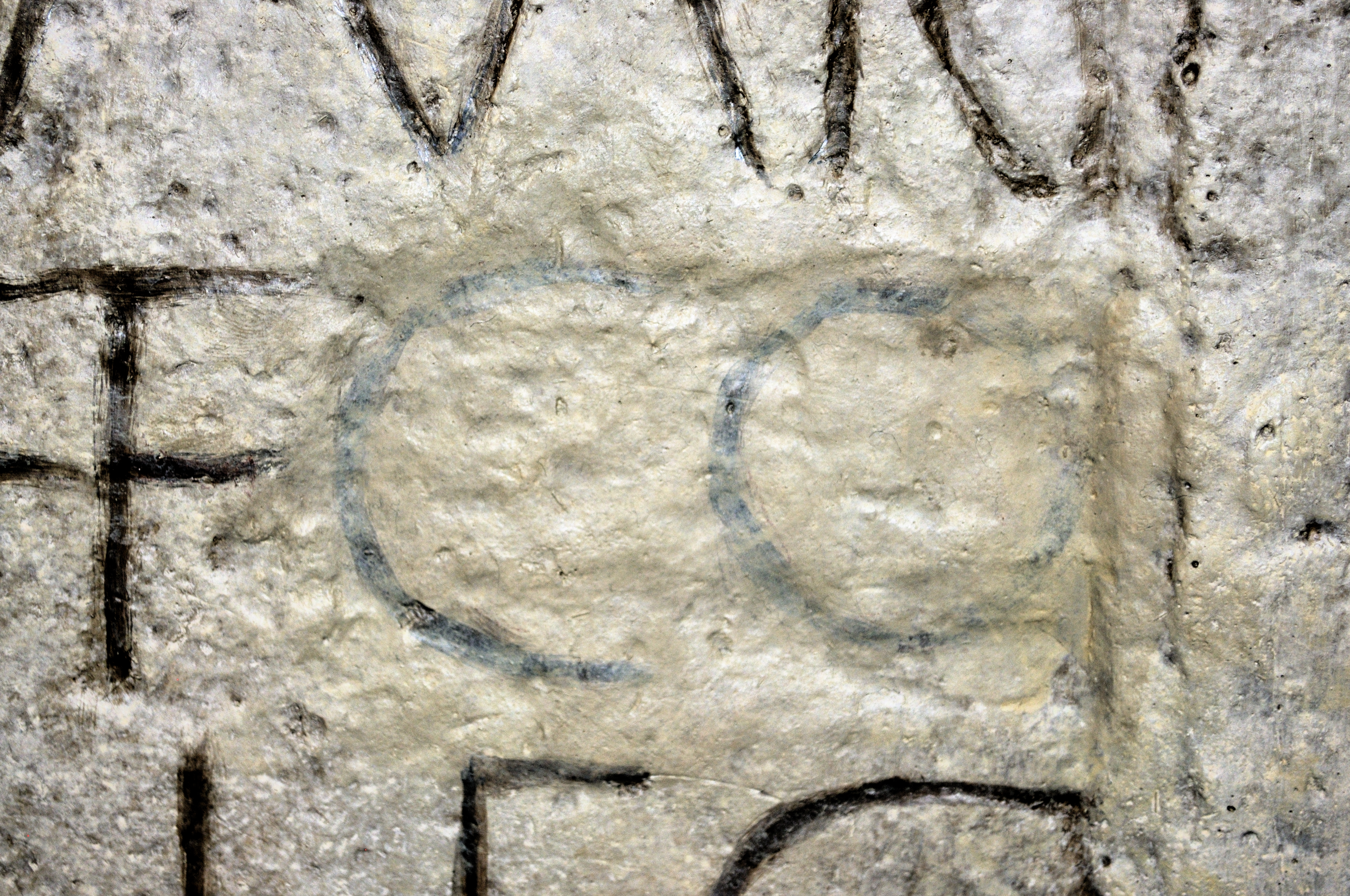
Damnatio memoriae of Commodus on an inscription in the Museum of Roman History in Osterburken, Germany. The abbreviation "CO" has been restored with paint.

In November 192, Commodus held Plebeian Games, in which he shot hundreds of animals with arrows and javelins every morning, and fought as a gladiator every afternoon, winning all the fights. In December, he announced his intention to inaugurate the year 193 as both consul and gladiator on 1 January.

When Marcia found a list of people Commodus intended to have executed, she discovered that she, the prefect Laetus, and Eclectus were on it. The three of them plotted to assassinate the emperor. On 31 December, Marcia poisoned Commodus's food, but he vomited up the poison, so the conspirators sent his wrestling partner Narcissus to strangle him in his bath.

Upon his death, the Senate declared him a public enemy (a de facto damnatio memoriae) and restored the original name of the city of Rome and its institutions. Statues of Commodus were demolished. His body was buried in the Mausoleum of Hadrian.

Commodus's death marked the end of the Nerva–Antonine dynasty. Commodus was succeeded by Pertinax, whose reign was short; he became the first claimant to be usurped during the Year of the Five Emperors.

In 195, the emperor Septimius Severus, trying to gain favour with the family of Marcus Aurelius, rehabilitated Commodus's memory and had the Senate deify him.

== Character and physical prowess ==
=== Character and motivations ===
Cassius Dio, a first-hand witness, describes him as "not naturally wicked but, on the contrary, as guileless as any man that ever lived. His great simplicity, however, together with his cowardice, made him the slave of his companions, and it was through them that he at first, out of ignorance, missed the better life and then was led on into lustful and cruel habits, which soon became second nature."

His recorded actions do tend to show a rejection of his father's policies, his father's advisers, and especially his father's austere lifestyle, and an alienation from the surviving members of his family. It seems likely that he was raised in an atmosphere of Stoic asceticism, which he rejected entirely upon his accession to sole rule.

After repeated attempts on Commodus's life, Roman citizens were often killed for making him angry. One such notable event was the attempted extermination of the house of the Quinctilii. Condianus and Maximus were executed on the pretext that while they were not implicated in any plots, their wealth and talent would make them unhappy with the current state of affairs. Historian Aelius Lampridius recorded another event taking place at the Roman baths at Terme Taurine, where a young Commodus ordered an attendant to be thrown into an oven after he had found his bathwater to be lukewarm, although a sheep skin was secretly substituted by a slave to replicate the burnt smell, sparing the attendant's life.

=== Changes of name ===
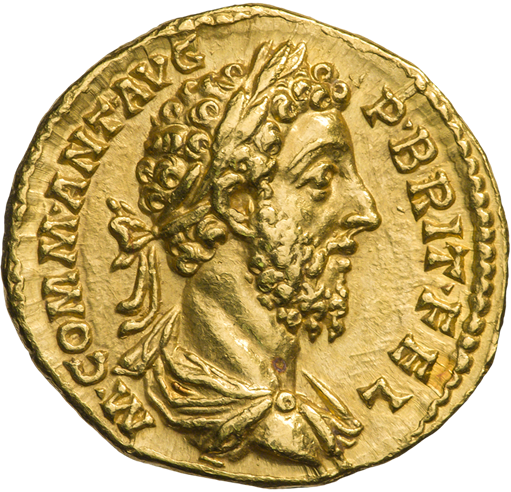

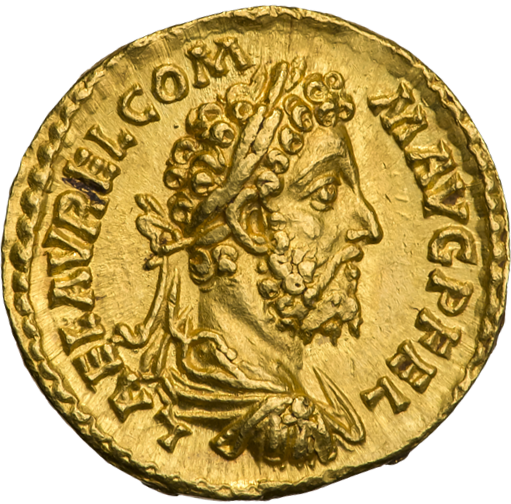
Two aurei of AD 186 and 192 showing Commodus' change from "Marcus Aurelius Commodus Antoninus" to his original "Lucius Aelius Aurelius Commodus"

His original name was Lucius Aelius Aurelius Commodus. On his father's death in 180, Commodus changed this to Marcus Aurelius Commodus Antoninus, before changing back to his birth name in 191. Later that year he adopted as his full style Lucius Aelius Aurelius Commodus Augustus Herculeus Romanus Exsuperatorius Amazonius Invictus Felix Pius (the order of some of these titles varies in the sources). "Exsuperatorius" (the supreme) was a title given to Jupiter, and "Amazonius" identified him again with Hercules.

An inscribed altar from Dura-Europos on the Euphrates shows that Commodus's titles and the renaming of the months were disseminated to the farthest reaches of the Empire; moreover, that even auxiliary military units received the title Commodiana, and that he claimed two additional titles: Pacator Orbis (pacifier of the world) and Dominus Noster (Our Lord). The latter eventually would be used as a conventional title by Roman emperors, starting about a century later, but Commodus seems to have been the first to assume it.

=== Commodus and Hercules ===
Disdaining the more philosophic inclinations of his father, Commodus was extremely proud of his physical prowess. The historian Herodian, a contemporary, described Commodus as an extremely handsome man. As mentioned above, he ordered many statues to be made showing him dressed as Hercules with a lion's hide and a club. He thought of himself as the reincarnation of Hercules, frequently emulating the legendary hero's feats by appearing in the arena to fight a variety of wild animals. He was left-handed and very proud of the fact. Cassius Dio and the writers of the Augustan History say that Commodus was a skilled archer, who could shoot the heads off ostriches in full gallop, and kill a panther as it attacked a victim in the arena.

=== Commodus the gladiator ===
Commodus also had a passion for gladiatorial combat, which he took so far as to take to the arena himself, dressed as a secutor. The Romans found Commodus's gladiatorial combat to be scandalous and disgraceful. According to Herodian, spectators of Commodus thought it unbecoming of an emperor to take up arms in the amphitheater for sport when he could be campaigning against barbarians among other opponents of Rome. The consensus was that it was below his office to participate as a gladiator. Popular rumors spread alleging he was not actually the son of Marcus Aurelius, but of a gladiator his mother Faustina had taken as a lover at the coastal resort of Caieta.

Cassius Dio claimed that citizens of Rome who lacked feet (either through accident or illness) were taken to the arena, where they were tethered together for Commodus to club to death while pretending they were giants. Dio also wrote that it was Commodus's custom to privately use deadly weapons to fight, murdering and maiming his opponents.

Commodus was also known for fighting exotic animals in the arena, often to the horror and disgust of the Roman populace. According to Cassius Dio, Commodus once killed 100 lions in a single day. Later, he decapitated a running ostrich with a specially designed dart and afterward carried his sword and the bleeding head of the dead bird over to the Senators' seating area, and motioned to suggest that they were to be next. Dio notes that the targeted senators actually found this more ridiculous than frightening, and chewed on laurel leaves to conceal their laughter. On other occasions, Commodus killed three elephants on the floor of the arena by himself, and a giraffe.

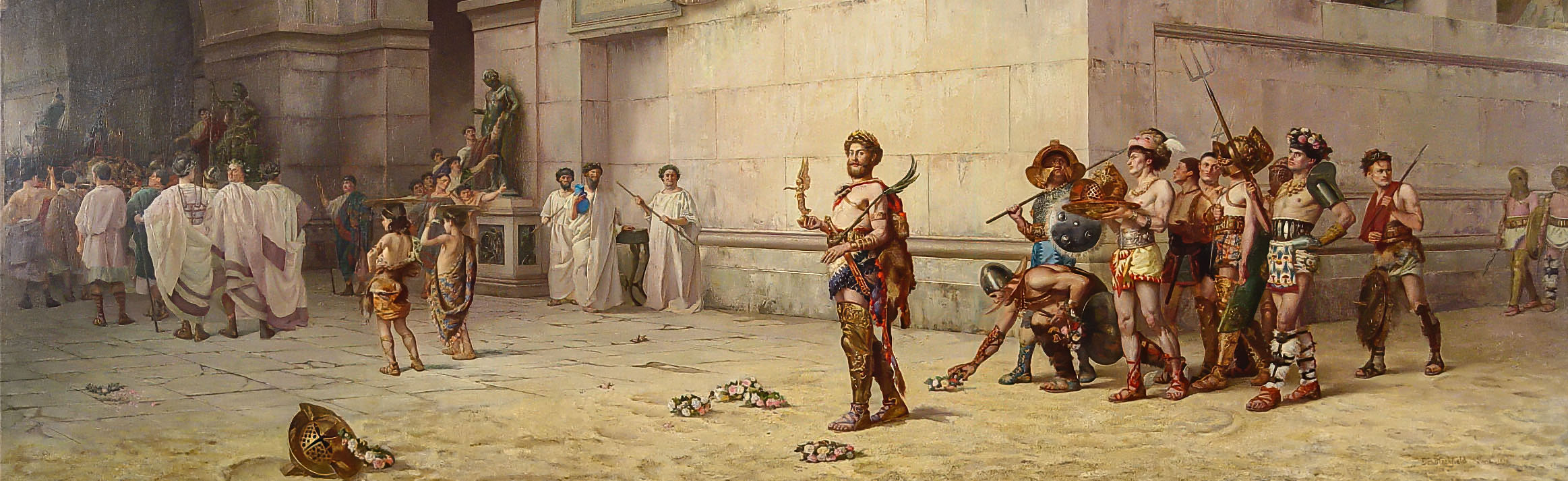
The Emperor Commodus Leaving the Arena at the Head of the Gladiators (detail) by Edwin Blashfield (1848–1936), Hermitage Museum and Gardens, Norfolk, Virginia.

== In popular culture ==
- An evil and highly narcissistic Commodus is portrayed by Canadian actor Christopher Plummer in the classic epic film The Fall of the Roman Empire (1964), directed by Anthony Mann. This film depicts all of this emperor's reign, from the death of Marcus Aurelius until his own death while fighting against the fictional hero Livius.
- In the Best Picture winner Gladiator (2000), a fictionalized Commodus serves as the main antagonist of the film. He is played by Joaquin Phoenix, who received a Best Supporting Actor nomination at the 73rd Academy Awards.
- Commodus appears in the Horrible Histories song "Evil Emperors", alongside Caligula, Elagabalus, and Nero, a parody of "Bad".
- The 2017 docu-drama miniseries Roman Empire: Reign of Blood retells his story. In this version, Narcissus kills Commodus in a duel after learning that the Emperor's arena opponents had been armed only with edgeless swords. At first, Narcissus strangles Commodus, but ultimately kills him by piercing his heart with a blunt sword. Aaron Jakubenko portrays Commodus in the series.
- Commodus appears as one of the antagonists in the popular young adult fiction novel series The Trials of Apollo. He is revealed as having become a minor god after his death and has survived into modern times, along with two other Roman emperors, Caligula and Nero.

== Nerva–Antonine family tree ==
Nerva–Antonine family tree

Q. Marcius Barea Soranus	Q. Marcius Barea Sura	Antonia Furnilla	M. Cocceius Nerva	Sergia Plautilla	P. Aelius Hadrianus
Titus (r. 79–81)	Marcia Furnilla	Marcia	Trajanus Pater	Nerva (r. 96–98)	Ulpia (Note: Sister of Trajan's father: Giacosa (1977), p. 7.)	Aelius Hadrianus Marullinus
Flavia (Note: Giacosa (1977), p. 8.)	Marciana (Note: Levick (2014), p. 161.)	C. Salonius Matidius (Note: Husband of Ulpia Marciana: Levick (2014), p. 161.)	Trajan (r. 98–117)	Plotina	P. Acilius Attianus	P. Aelius Afer (Note: Giacosa (1977), p. 7.)	Paulina Major (Note: DIR contributor (Herbert W. Benario, 2000), "Hadrian".)
Lucius Mindius (2)	Libo Rupilius Frugi (3)	Salonia Matidia (Note: Giacosa (1977), p. 9.)	L. Vibius Sabinus (1) (Note: Husband of Salonia Matidia: Levick (2014), p. 161.)
Paulina Minor	L. Julius Ursus Servianus (Note: Smith (1870), "Julius Servianus".)
Matidia Minor	Sabina	Hadrian (Note: Smith (1870), "Hadrian", pp. 319–322.) (r. 117–138)	Antinous (Note: Lover of Hadrian: Lambert (1984), p. 99 and passim; deification: Lambert (1984), pp. 2–5, etc.)
C. Fuscus Salinator I	Julia Serviana Paulina
M. Annius Verus (Note: Husband of Rupilia Faustina: Levick (2014), p. 163.)	Rupilia Faustina (Note: Levick (2014), p. 163.) (Note: It is uncertain whether Rupilia Faustina was Frugi's daughter by Salonia Matidia or another woman.)	Boionia Procilla	Cn. Arrius Antoninus
L. Ceionius Commodus	Appia Severa	C. Fuscus Salinator II
L. Caesennius Paetus	Arria Antonina	Arria Fadilla (Note: Levick (2014), p. 162.)	T. Aurelius Fulvus
L. Caesennius Antoninus	L. Commodus	Plautia	unknown (Note: Levick (2014), p. 164.)	C. Avidius Nigrinus
M. Annius Verus	Calvisia Domitia Lucilla (Note: Wife of M. Annius Verus: Giacosa (1977), p. 10.)	Fundania (Note: Wife of M. Annius Libo: Levick (2014), p. 163.)	M. Annius Libo	Faustina	Antoninus Pius (r. 138–161)	L. Aelius Caesar	Avidia
Cornificia	Marcus Aurelius (r. 161–180) (Note: Giacosa (1977), p. 10.)	Faustina Minor	Aurelia Fadilla	Lucius Verus (r. 161–169) (1)	Ceionia Fabia	Plautius Quintillus (Note: Husband of Ceionia Fabia: Levick (2014), p. 164.)	Q. Servilius Pudens	Ceionia Plautia
Cornificia Minor (Note: Levick (2014), p. 117.)	M. Petronius Sura	Commodus (r. 177–192)	Fadilla	M. Annius Verus Caesar	Ti. Claudius Pompeianus (2)	Lucilla	M. Plautius Quintillus	Junius Licinius Balbus	Servilia Ceionia
Petronius Antoninus	L. Aurelius Agaclytus (2)	Aurelia Sabina	L. Antistius Burrus (1)	Plautius Quintillus	Plautia Servilla	C. Furius Sabinus Timesitheus	Maecia Faustina	Junius Licinius Balbus?
Furia Sabinia Tranquillina	Gordian III (r. 238–244)

- (1) = 1st spouse
- (2) = 2nd spouse
- (3) = 3rd spouse
- Reddish-purple indicates emperor of the Nerva–Antonine dynasty
  lighter purple indicates designated imperial heir of said dynasty who never reigned
  grey indicates unsuccessful imperial aspirants
  bluish-purple indicates emperors of other dynasties
- dashed lines indicate adoption; dotted lines indicate love affairs/unmarried relationships
- Small Caps = posthumously deified (Augusti, Augustae, or other)

Notes:

Except where otherwise noted, the notes below indicate that an individual's parentage is as shown in the above family tree.

References:
- DIR contributors (2000). "De Imperatoribus Romanis: An Online Encyclopedia of Roman Rulers and Their Families".
- Giacosa, Giorgio (1977). Women of the Caesars: Their Lives and Portraits on Coins. Translated by Holloway, R. Ross. Milan: Edizioni Arte e Moneta. ISBN 0-8390-0193-2.
- Lambert, Royston (1984). Beloved and God: The Story of Hadrian and Antinous. New York: Viking. ISBN 0-670-15708-2.
- Levick, Barbara (2014). Faustina I and II: Imperial Women of the Golden Age. Oxford University Press. ISBN 978-0-19-537941-9.
- Smith, William, ed. (1870). Dictionary of Greek and Roman Biography and Mythology.

== See also ==
- List of Roman emperors

== Sources ==
- "Lucius Aurelius Commodus" . Encyclopædia Britannica. Vol. 6 (9th ed.). 1878. pp. 207–208.
- "Commodus, Lucius Aelius Aurelius" . Encyclopædia Britannica. Vol. 6 (11th ed.). 1911. p. 777.

Commodus Nerva–Antonine dynasty Born: 31 August 161 Died: 31 December 192
Regnal titles
Preceded by Marcus Aurelius	Roman emperor 180–192	Succeeded by Pertinax
Political offices
Preceded by T. Pomponius Proculus Vitrasius Pollio; M. Flavius Aper II as ordinary consuls	Roman consul 177 with Marcus Peducaeus Plautius Quintillus	Succeeded by Ser. Cornelius Scipio Salvidienus Orfitus, Domitius Velius Rufus as ordinary consuls
Preceded by Ser. Cornelius Scipio Salvidienus Orfitus, Domitius Velius Rufus as ordinary consuls	Roman consul 179 with Publius Martius Verus	Succeeded by T. Flavius Claudianus, L. Aemilius Iuncus as suffect consuls
Preceded by L. Fulvius Rusticus G. Bruttius Praesens II, Sex. Quintilius Condianus as ordinary consuls	Roman consul 181 with Lucius Antistius Burrus	Succeeded by M. Petronius Sura Mamertinus, Q. Tineius Rufus as ordinary consuls
Preceded by Marcus Petronius Sura Mamertinus, Q. Tineius Rufus as ordinary consuls	Roman consul 183 with Gaius Aufidius Victorinus	Succeeded by L. Tutilius Pontianus Gentianus, ignotus as suffect consuls
Preceded by Triarius Maternus, Ti. Claudius M. Appius Atilius; Bradua Regillus Atticus	Roman consul 186 with Marcus Acilius Glabrio II	Succeeded by L. Novius Rufus, L. Annius Ravus as suffect consuls
Preceded by Domitius Iulius Silanus, Q. Servilius Silanus as suffect consuls	Roman consul 190 with Marcus Petronius Sura Septimianus	Succeeded by L. Septimius Severus, Apuleius Rufinus as suffect consuls
Preceded by Popilius Pedo Apronianus, M. Valerius Bradua Mauricus as ordinary consuls	Roman consul 192 with Publius Helvius Pertinax	Succeeded by Q. Pompeius Sosius Falco, G. Julius Erucius Clarus Vibianus as ordinary consuls
