= List of governors of Roman Egypt =

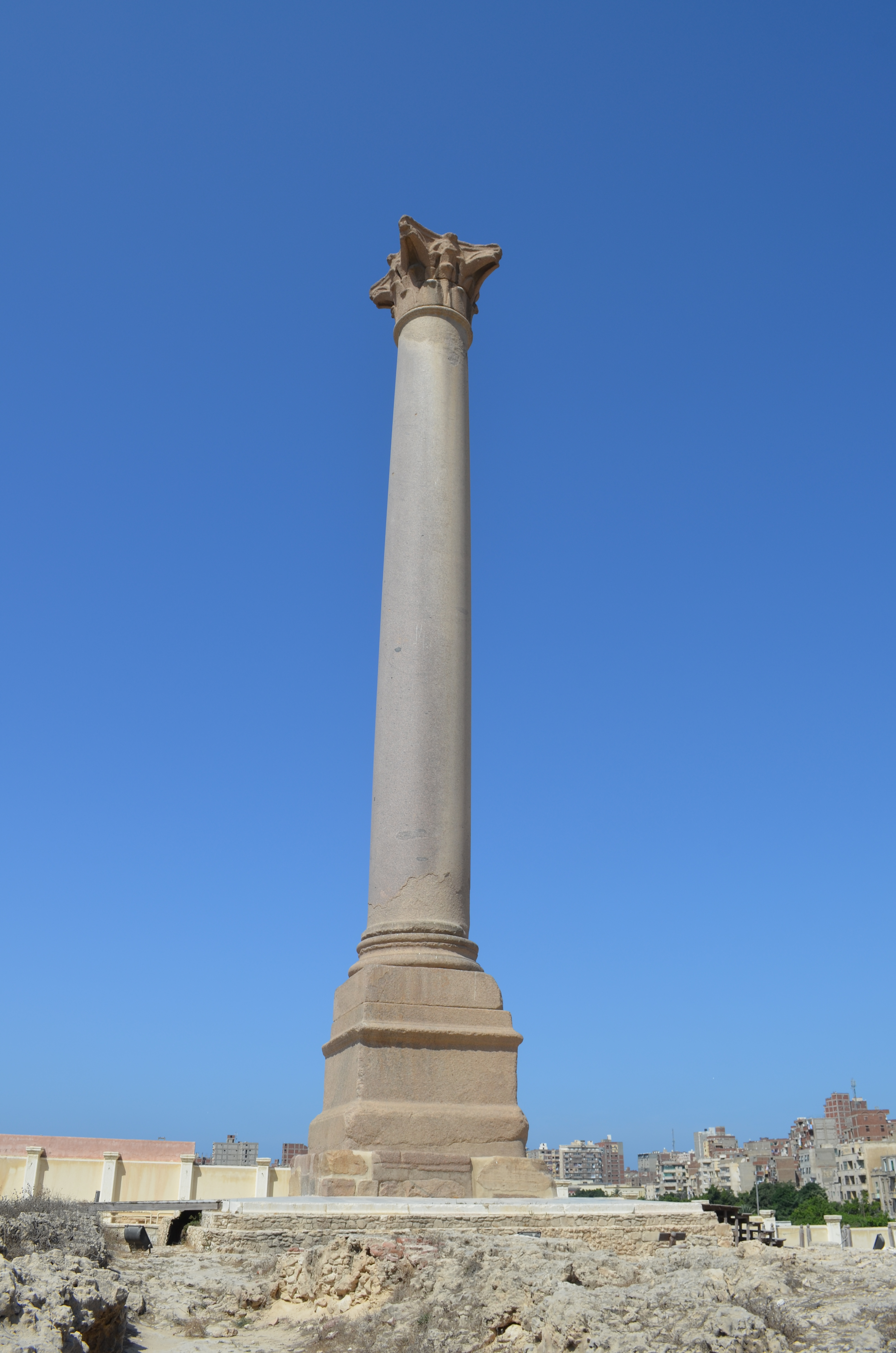
"Pompey's Pillar", erected in Alexandria by the governor Aristius Optatus in the reign of Diocletian (r. 284–305)

During the Roman Empire, the governor of Roman Egypt (praefectus Aegypti) was a prefect who administered the Roman province of Egypt with the delegated authority (imperium) of the emperor.

Egypt was established as a Roman province in consequence of the Battle of Actium, where Cleopatra as the last independent ruler of Egypt and her Roman ally Mark Antony were defeated by Octavian, the adopted heir of the assassinated Roman dictator Julius Caesar. Octavian then rose to supreme power with the title Augustus, ending the era of the Roman Republic and installing himself as princeps, the so-called "leading citizen" of Rome who in fact acted as an autocratic ruler. Although senators continued to serve as governors of most other provinces (the senatorial provinces), especially those annexed under the Republic, the role of Egypt during the civil war with Antony and its strategic and economic importance prompted Augustus to ensure that no rival could secure Aegyptus as an asset. He thus established Egypt as an imperial province, to be governed by a prefect he appointed from men of the equestrian order.

As Egypt was a special imperial domain, a rich and strategic granary, where the Emperor enjoyed an almost pharaonic position unlike any other province or diocese, its head was styled uniquely Praefectus Augustalis, indicating that he governed in the personal name of the emperor, the "Augustus". The praefectus Aegypti was considered to hold the highest ranking equestrian post during the early empire. Later, the post would fall second to that of the praetorian command, but its position remained highly prestigious.

A prefect of Egypt usually held the office for three or four years. An equestrian appointed to the office received no specialized training, and seems to have been chosen for his military experience and knowledge of Roman law and administration. Any knowledge he might have of Egypt and its arcane traditions of politics and bureaucracy—which Philo of Alexandria described as "intricate and diversified, hardly grasped even by those who have made a business of studying them from their earliest years"—was incidental to his record of Roman service and the emperor's favor.

== 1st century ==
Unless otherwise noted, governors from 30 BC to AD 260 are taken from Guido Bastianini, "Lista dei prefetti d'Egitto dal 30^{a} al 299^{p}", Zeitschrift für Papyrologie und Epigraphik, 17 (1975), pp. 263–321, 323–328

- 30–26 BC: Gaius Cornelius Gallus
- 26–24 BC: Aelius Gallus
- 24–22 BC: Gaius Petronius or Publius Petronius
- 13–12 BC: Publius Rubrius Barbarus
- 7–4 BC: Gaius Turranius
- AD 2–3: Publius Octavius
- 3–10: Quintus Ostorius Scapula
- 10–11: Gaius Julius Aquila
- 11–12: Lucius Antonius Pedo
- 12–14: Marcus Magius Maximus
- c. 15: Lucius Seius Strabo
- c. 15: Aemilius Rectus
- 16–32: Gaius Galerius
- c. 32: Vitrasius Pollio (died in office)
- c. 32: Hiberus (Vice prefect)
- 33–38: Aulus Avilius Flaccus
- circa 38: Quintus Naevius Cordus Sutorius Macro
- 38–41: Gaius Vitrasius Pollio
- 41–42: Lucius Aemilius Rectus
- between 42 and 45: Marcus Heius
- 45–48: Gaius Julius Postumus
- 48–52: Gnaeus Vergilius Capito
- c. 54: Lucius Lusius Geta
- 55–59: Tiberius Claudius Balbillus Modestus
- 60–62: Lucius Julius Vestinus
- 63–66: Gaius Caecina Tuscus
- 66–69: Tiberius Julius Alexander
- 70: Lucius Peducaeus Colo(nus?)
- 71–73: Tiberius Julius Lupus
- c. 74: Gaius Valerius Paulinus
- 75–76: [S]ept[imius?] Nu[...]
- 76/77 or 77/78: Lucius Julius Ursus
- 78–79: Gaius Aeterius Fronto
- 80–82: Gaius Tettius Cassianus Priscus
- 83–84: Lucius Laberius Maximus
- 85–88: Gaius Septimius Vegetus
- 89–92: Marcus Mettius Rufus
- 92–93: Titus Petronius Secundus
- 94–98: Marcus Junius Rufus
- 98–100: Gaius Pompeius Planta

== 2nd century ==
- 100–103: Gaius Minicius Italus
- 103–107: Gaius Vibius Maximus
- 107–112: Servius Sulpicius Similis
- 113–117: Marcus Rutilius Lupus
- 117–119: Quintus Rammius Martialis
- 120–124: Titus Haterius Nepos
- 126: Petronius Quadratus (Note: O.W. Reinmuth disagrees, dating Quadratus between 180 and 190.)
- 126–133: Titus Flavius Titianus
- 133–137: Marcus Petronius Mamertinus
- 137–142: Gaius Avidius Heliodorus
- 142–143: Gaius Valerius Eudaemon
- 144–147: Lucius Valerius Proculus
- 147–148: Marcus Petronius Honoratus
- 150–154: Lucius Munatius Felix
- 154–159: Marcus Sempronius Liberalis
- 159–160: Titus Furius Victorinus
- 161: Lucius Volusius Maecianus
- 161–164: Marcus Annaeus Syriacus
- 164–167: Titus Flavius Titianus
- 167–168: Quintus Baienus Blassianus
- 168–169: Marcus Bassaeus Rufus
- 170–176: Gaius Calvisius Statianus
- 176: Gaius Caecilius Salvianus (Vice prefect)
- 176–179 Titus Pactumeius Magnus
- 179–180: Titus Aius Sanctus
- c. 181: Titus Flavius Piso
- 181–183: Decimus Veturius Macrinus
- c. 184:Vernasius Facundus
- 185: Titus Longaeus Rufus
- 185–187: Pomponius Faustinianus
- 188: Marcus Aurelius Verrianus
- c. 188: Marcus Aurelius Papirius Dionysius
- 189–190: Quintus Tineius Demetrius
- 190: Claudius Lucilianus
- 192: Larcius Memor
- 192–194: Lucius Mantennius Sabinus
- 195–196: Marcus Ulpius Primianus
- 197–200: Quintus Aemilius Saturninus

== 3rd century ==
Names and dates after 260 are taken from the Prosopography of the Later Roman Empire. Dates given are those in which the prefects are known to have held office, but not necessarily when they started or ended their terms.

- 200–203: Quintus Maecius Laetus
- 203–206: Claudius Julianus
- 206–211: Tiberius Claudius Subatianus Aquila
- 212–213: Lucius Baebius Aurelius Juncinus
- 214–215: Marcus Aurelius Septimius Heraclitus (executed by Caracalla)
- 216: Aurelius Antinous (vice prefect)
- 216–217: Lucius Valerius Datus
- 218: Julius Basilianus
- 218–219: Callistianus
- 219–221: Geminius Chrestus
- 222: Lucius Domitius Honoratus
- 222–223: Marcus Aedinius Julianus
- 224: Marcus Aurelius Epagatus
- 224–225: Tiberius Claudius Herennianus
- 229–230: Claudius Masculinus
- 231: Marcus Aurelius Zeno Januarius
- 232–237: Maebius Honoratianus
- c. 240: Lucius Lucretius Annianus
- 241–242: Gnaeus Domitius Philippus
- 242–245: Aurelius Basileus
- 245–248: Gaius Valerius Firmus
- 249–250: Aurelius Appius Sabinus
- 251–252: Faltonius Restitutianus
- 252–253: Lissenius Proculus
- 253: Septimius [...]
- 253: Lucius Titinius Clodianus
- 253–256: Titus Magnius Felix Crescentillianus
- 257–258: Ulpius Pasion
- c. 258: Claudius Theodorus
- 258–262: Lucius Mussius Aemilianus
- 262–263: Aurelius Theodotus
- 264 July 23: Gaius Claudius Firmus
- 266 March 28: Cussonius I[...]
- 267 March 16–July 15: Juvenius Genialis
- 269/270: Tenagino Probus
- before 271: Statilius Ammianus
- 271: Julius Marcellinus
- 274 February 8: Gaius Claudius Firmus
- mid/late 3rd century: Aurelius Proculinus
- 279/280: [..]le[.]ius
- 280 November 7: Sallustius Hadrianius
- 283: Celerinus
- 283 November 2–284 May 21: Pomponius Januarianus
- 284/286: Marcus Aurelius Diogenes
- 277/285: Aurelius Mercurius
- before 287: Peregrinus
- 287 October 24–290 February/March: Gaius Valerius Pompeianus
- 291–292: Titius Honoratus
- Late third century?: Heraclius
- Late third/early fourth century: [...]elius
- Late third/early fourth century: Unknown
- Late third/early fourth century?: [.]banus
- 297 March 16: Aristius Optatus
- 297 September: Aurelius Achilleus
- 299: Aelius Publius

== 4th century ==
- 303/311: (?)Apollonius(?)
- c. 303: (?)Eustratius(?)
- 303/306: (?)Armenius(?) (comes in Egypt)
- 303 February 28–306 May 29: Clodius Culcianus
- 307: Sossianus Hierocles
- 308: Valerius Victorinus
- 308 September–309 June 22: Aelius Hyginus
- c. 310: Titinnius Clodianus
- 312 August 18: Aurelius Ammonius
- 314: Julius Julianus
- before 328: Aurelius Apion
- 328 June 8–329 April 6: Septimius Zenius
- 330: Flavius Magnilianus
- 331: Florentius
- 331–332: Flavius Hyginus
- 333–335: Paterius
- 335 September–337: Philagrius (first term)
- (337?–)338: Antonius Theodorus
- 338–340: Philagrius (second term)
- 341–343: Longinus
- 344: Palladius
- 345–352: Nestorius
- 353–354: Sebastianus
- 355–356 February 11: Maximus
- 356 June 10–357: Cataphronius
- 357–359: Parnassius
- 359 (for three months): Italicianus
- 359–361: Faustinus
- before 361: Hermogenes
- early–mid 4th century?: Himerius
- 361 November 30–362 February 4: Gerontius
- 362 October–363 September 16: Ecdicius Olympus
- 364: Hierius
- 364: Maximus
- 364–366 July 21: Flavianus
- 366–367: Proclianus
- 367/375: Unknown
- 367 January 27–370 October 6: Eutolmius Tatianus (Note: First governor to be styled "Augustal prefect". PLRE 1, p. 876)
- 370–371: Olympius Palladius
- 371–374: Aelius Palladius
- 376?: (?)Publius(?)
- 379: (?)Bassianus(?)
- 379: (?)Hadrianus(?)
- 380 March 17: Julianus
- 381(–382?): (?)Antoninus(?)
- 382 May 14: Palladius
- 383 April 29–May 8: Hypatius (first term)
- 384 February 4: Optatus
- 384 December 20–386 June 16: Florentius
- 386 July 25–November 30: Paulinus
- 387: Eusebius
- 388 April 30: Ulpius Erythrius
- 388–390 February 18: Alexander
- 391 June 16: Evagrius
- 392 April: Hypatius (second term)
- 392 5 May–July 30: Potamius
- late 4th century: Damonicus
- late 4th century: Theodorus
- 396 February 5: Gennadius Torquatus
- 396 March 20–30: Remigius
- 397 June 17–November 24: Archelaus
- 398/404: (?)Paulacius(?)

== 5th century ==
- 403/404: Pentadius
- 403/404: Euthalius
- 415: Orestes
- early 5th century: Unknown
- c. 420/430: Theodorus
- 422 September 7?: Callistus
- ealy/mid 5th century: Aelianus
- 435 January 29: Cleopater
- 443 June 25: Charmosynus
- 451: Theodorus
- 453: Florus
- 457: Nicolaus
- 468 August 20–469 September 7: Flavius Alexander
- 475–476: Boethius
- 477: Anthemius
- c. 478/480: Theoctistus
- 482: Theognostus
- 482: Pergamius
- 482: Apollonius
- 482/490: Eutrechius
- 487 March 23: Theodorus
- 487: Arsenius
- 5th/6th century: [...]anus

== 6th century ==
An administrative reform in late 538 or early 539 led to the title praefectus Aegypti being replaced by dux et augustalis Alexandriae. Both titles were held in succession by Rhodon.

- 501: Eustathius
- 516: Theodosius
- 518/523: Flavius Strategius
- 520: Licinius
- 527/548: Zeno
- 535: Dioscorus
- 538: Rhodon
- 538/539–c. 542: Liberius
- c. 542: Ioannes Laxarion
- 545/546(–551?): Hephaestus (Note: John Stewart, disagreeing with Henri Munier and the PLRE, dates Hephaestus' tenure to 527.)
- c. 560: Flavorinus
- c. 566: Germanus Iustinus
- mid 6th century: Iulianus
- 582: Ioannes (first term) (Note: The dates of Ioannes and Paulus' tenures are only given as "late 6th century" in the PLRE. The years provided here are from John Stewart's African states and rulers.)
- c. 585: Paulus
- c. 588: Ioannes (second term)
- c. 592: Constantinus
- 598/600: Menas
- 602: Petrus Iustinus (Note: The PLRE, disagreeing with John Stewart and Henri Munier, lists Petrus and Iustinus/Iustinas as two different prefects.)
- 609: Ioannes
- (610?)–617: Nicetas

== Sassanian Occupation ==
#	Governor	Start	End	Termination
–	Benjamin (Patriarch-Prefect)	616	628	
1	Shahrbaraz	618	before 621	
2	Sahralanyozan	ca. 621	625?	
3	Shahrbaraz	ca. 626?	ca. 628	Egypt recorded as being under Shahrbaraz's control when he concluded his agreement with Heraclius on withdrawal of Persian troops

== Second Byzantine Period (628–642) ==
#	Governor	Start	End	Termination
–	Cyrus (Patriarch-Prefect)	631	end of 640	It is unclear whether the Patriarch of Alexandria Cyrus, contrary to ecclesiastical canons, also held the title dux et augustalis Alexandriae. More likely, he became the de facto governor of Egypt through an imperial commission that granted him immense secular authority. His first term ended when he was recalled and exiled by Emperor Heraclius.
1	Unknown	628	629	
2	Anastasius	629	14 September 641	The PLRE states that Anastasius "may have been dux et augustalis of Alexandria, but this is not certain". His term ended when Cyrus and Theodorus returned from Constantinople
–	Cyrus (Patriarch-Prefect)	14 September 641	21 March 642	Second term. Died in office
3	Theodorus	14 September 641	17 September 642	Left Egypt with all remaining Roman troops

== See also ==
- Lists of ancient Roman governors
- Lists of rulers of Egypt

== Sources ==
- Butler, Alfred J. (1978) [1902]. The Arab Conquest of Egypt and the Last Thirty Years under Roman Dominion (PDF). Oxford University Press. ISBN 0-19-821678-5.
- Martindale, John R.; Jones, A. H. M.; Morris, John, eds. (1971). The Prosopography of the Later Roman Empire: Volume I, AD 260–395. Cambridge: Cambridge University Press. ISBN 0-521-07233-6.
- Martindale, John R., ed. (1980). The Prosopography of the Later Roman Empire: Volume II, AD 395–527. Cambridge: Cambridge University Press. ISBN 0-521-20159-4.
- Martindale, John R., ed. (1992). The Prosopography of the Later Roman Empire: Volume III, AD 527–641. Cambridge: Cambridge University Press. ISBN 0-521-20160-8.
- Meyendorff, John (1989). Imperial unity and Christian divisions: The Church, AD 450–680. St. Vladimir's Seminary Press. ISBN 978-0881410556.
- Munier, Henri (1932). Précis de l'histoire d'Egypte par divers historiens et archéologues. Vol. 2. Institut Français d'Archéologie Orientale.
- Stewart, John (2006). African States and Rulers (Third ed.). London: McFarland. ISBN 0-7864-2562-8.
