= Appius =

Latin personal name

Appius (Latin pronunciation: [ˈappɪ.ʊs]), feminine Appia, is a Latin praenomen, or personal name, usually abbreviated Ap. or sometimes App., and best known as a result of its extensive use by the patrician gens Claudia. The praenomen also gave rise to the patronymic gens Appia.

== Origin and meaning ==
As with many praenomina, there is no satisfactory explanation of the meaning of Appius. The origin of the name has been obscured by the fact that it is chiefly known from its association with gens Claudia, and was borne by no other major figures in Roman history. Titus Livius relates the story of how, in the early days of the Roman Republic, a wealthy Sabine by the name of Attius Clausus emigrated to Rome from the town of Cures, together with his family and retainers, and was admitted to the patriciate. He subsequently Latinized his name, becoming Appius Claudius. The Claudii became one of the greatest of the Roman gentes, supplying numerous magistrates over several centuries.

The Claudian gens was also one of the proudest and most conservative families at Rome, nearly always siding with the aristocratic party against the plebs and the more reform-minded amongst the patricians. Many of them were known as much by the praenomen Appius as by the nomen Claudius, and the most famous of Roman roads, the Via Appia, or Appian Way, was named for its builder, Appius Claudius Caecus.

For this reason, it is often said that the Claudii, who made constant use of the name Appius, were the only family to use that praenomen, and that it must have been a Latinization of the Oscan praenomen Attius or Attus. However, the name was by no means unique to the Claudian gens. During a political crisis in the middle of the 5th century BC, the Capitol was seized by a force of political refugees and slaves in a brief revolt led by Appius Herdonius. Herdonius was a Sabine, like the ancestors of the Claudii, but his name shows that Appius had an existence independent of that gens.

During the later years of the Republic, and continuing into Imperial times, the praenomen Appius was used by several plebeian gentes, including the Annii, Junii, Modii, Popidii, Saufeii, Silvii, and Villii. It must also have been used by the ancestors of gens Appia. Thus, it would be more accurate to say that the Claudii were the only patrician family to make regular use of the name. It may well have been more widespread amongst the plebeians, although most of the names that have come down to us from the period of the early Republic are from the leading patrician houses.

As for whether Appius was introduced to Latin through contact with the Sabines or other Oscan-speaking peoples, it cannot be determined whether it was originally Oscan, or whether it belongs to the class of praenomina that were common to the Latin, Oscan, and Umbrian languages. It may be that when Attius Clausus adopted a Latin name, he chose a praenomen that was the Latin cognate of his own, or that he chose the Latin praenomen that sounded the closest.

Appius was unique in that it was never passed on to emancipated slaves, a Roman freedman of an Appius would instead take on the praenomen of the emancipator's father; hence P. Clodius App. l. Eros.

== People with the name ==
Notable people with the name include:

- Appius Claudius Crassus (5th century BC), decemvir of the Roman Republic
- Appius Claudius Caecus (4th and 3rd century BC), politician and builder of the Appian Way
- Appius Claudius Caudex (264 BC), consul
- Appius Claudius Pulcher (consul 212 BC)
- Appius Claudius Pulcher (consul 185 BC)
- Appius Claudius Pulcher (consul 135 BC)
- Appius Claudius Pulcher (praetor 88 BC)
- Appius Claudius Pulcher (praetor 57 BC)
- Appius Claudius Pulcher (consul 38 BC)
- Gaius Octavius Appius Suetrius Sabinus (fl. 3rd century), a Roman senator and military officer

== See also ==
- Roman naming conventions
  - List of Roman nomina
  - List of Roman cognomina
