= Gaius Vitrasius Pollio (prefect AD 41) =

Roman eques

Gaius Vitrasius Pollio was a Roman eques who flourished during the reign of the emperor Claudius. He was appointed to the important office of praefectus or governor of Roman Egypt from AD 38 to 41.

The Vitrasii came from Cales. Pollio is considered the son of Vitrasius Pollio, who was praefectus of Roman Egypt around the year 32.

Upon arriving in Alexandria, Vitrasius Pollio had to deal with the aftermath of the Alexandrian riots of 38, which had been suppressed by his predecessor, Aulus Avilius Flaccus. Both sides in the riots, the Greeks and the Jews living in Alexandria, petitioned Pollio with their grievances; Pollio referred the matter to Claudius. A copy of the emperor's reply has survived in a papyrus found in the Fayyum.

Pollio and the commander of the cohors Ituraeorum, Lucius Eienus Saturninus, erected a dedication to the emperor Caligula 28 April 39 at Syene. When he returned to Rome, Vitrasius Pollio brought several pieces of porphyry stone he had quarried in Egypt, hoping to introduce an interest in that material. According to Pliny the Elder, it failed to attract sufficient interest.

Political offices
Preceded by Quintus Naevius Cordus Sutorius Macro	Prefectus of Aegyptus; 38–41	Succeeded by Lucius Aemilius Rectus
