= Firmus (disambiguation) =

Firmus (died 273) was a usurper during the reign of Aurelian.

Firmus may also refer to:

== People ==
- Firmus (4th-century usurper) (died 375)
- Firmus and Rusticus, 3rd century saints
- Gaius Valerius Firmus (fl. 3rd century), Roman eques
- Plotius Firmus (fl. 1st century), Roman knight and senator

== Other uses ==
- Firmus Energy, a Northern Ireland energy company
- Firmus Piett, a fictional character in Star Wars
