= Similis =

Similis may refer to:

- similis (Latin, 'similar'), a Latin word commonly used in systematic names
- Servius Sulpicius Similis (died c. 125), Roman governor
