= Decimus Veturius Macrinus =

Roman eques and praetorian prefect

Decimus Veturius Macrinus was a Roman eques who is known to have held imperial appointments under both emperors Commodus and Septimius Severus. He is best known for being governor of Roman Egypt under Commodus and praetorian prefect under Severus.

Although J. E. H. Spaul offers a possible career path for him, the earliest appointment known for Macrinus is as praefectus of Mauretania Tingitana; an altar he dedicated to the spirit of the Emperor Commodus, found at Volubilis, is dated to 13 October 180. This poses a problem, as has long been recognized, for his promotion to procurator began no later than 7 April 181 -- an impossibly quick rise through the ranks! Eric Birley suggested, based on a fragment of an inscription that records the name of a governor of Mauretania whose name began with a "D", that Macrinus was procurator Augusti utriusque Mauretaniae, which would put him in an appropriately senior post. Another suggestion was that there were two Veturii Macrini, which Spaul dismisses as "less likely". The solution Spaul proposes was that Macrinus had proven himself prior to his appointment to Mauretania Tingitana as qualified for the governorship of Egypt, but an experienced hand was needed to settle matters in that province. He points to the evidence of the altar, which addresses one Canarta as "principe constituto genti Baquatium": Macrinus' primary assignment as governor was evidently to secure Canarta's place as king of the Baquates, and enroll him as son of the emperor Commodus.

In any case, Macrinus is attested as governor of Egypt from 181 through 183. He then was unemployed by the imperial service until after the death of Commodus. It is in 193 that we hear of him again: according to the Historia Augusta, Macrinus was recruited by Septimus Severus to be his praetorian prefect. The beleaguered emperor Didius Julianus offered to make both Severus his co-emperor and Macrinus his third praetorian prefect, sending one of his prefects, Tullius Crispinus, to Severus with the message; Severus did not trust the intentions of his rival, and had Crispinus put to death. Anthony Birley notes that at this time Macrinus "cannot have been a young man", and had risen through the ranks as had Severus' other appointment for praetorian prefect, Flavius Juvenalis. It is not clear how long Macrinus held this last position: by the time Severus appointed his old friend Gaius Fulvius Plautianus praetorian prefect (no later than 8 June 197), we hear no more of either Macrinus or Juvenalis.

Political offices
Preceded by Titus Flavius Piso	Prefectus of Aegyptus; 181 − 183	Succeeded by Vernasius Facundus
