= Vitrasius Pollio =

1st century AD governor of the Roman province of Egypt

Vitrasius Pollio (died AD 32) was a member of the equestrian class who was prefect or governor of the imperial province of Egypt. He died in office, and was replaced by an imperial freedman Hiberus until another eques, Aulus Avilius Flaccus, could arrive from Rome.

Pollio is the earliest attested member of the Vitrasii. His son Gaius Vitrasius Pollio was prefect of Roman Egypt between the years 38 and 41.

Political offices
Preceded by Gaius Galerius	Prefect of Aegyptus c. 32	Succeeded by Hiberus
