= Baquates =

People living in Mauretania Tingitana

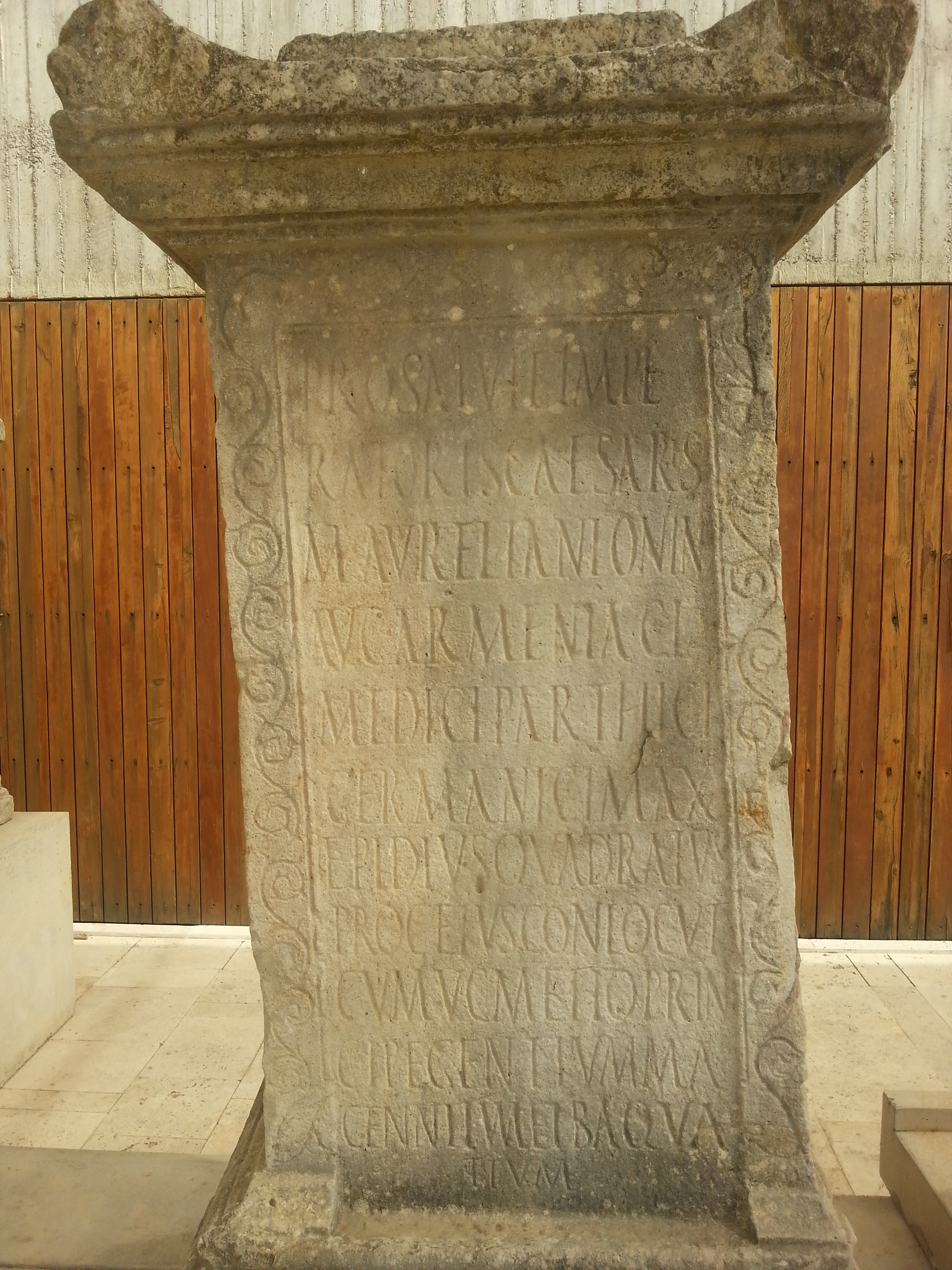
Monument commemorating the peace between the Romans and the Baquates under Ucmet (c.175)

The Baquates were a people living in Mauretania Tingitana under the Roman Empire. They are known from Greek and Latin literary sources and inscriptions of the second through fourth centuries AD.

== Location ==
There is conflicting data about the location of the Baquates in the literary sources. The sources are divided over whether they lived in the far south or east of the province of Mauretania Tingitana. Ptolemy mentions the Baquates twice in his Geography (c. 150) under two different spellings. He has the Bakouatai living north of the Makanitai and the Ouakouatai living to the east of the Banioubai. The Antonine Itinerary (3rd century) places the Baquates and Makanitai in the south of Mauretania Tingitana. In one passage in his Cosmography (late 4th century), Julius Honorius places the Baquates south of the Makanitai beyond the Bou Regreg, agreeing with the Itinerary. In another passage, however, he has them living much further east and north, just beyond the Moulouya river, which divides their land from that of the Bavares.

Inscriptions place them in the vicinity of Volubilis in the Middle Atlas. They were probably a semi-nomadic mountain people who wintered in the valleys below. The epigraphic evidence suggests that the Baquates may have been employed by the Romans as federates in the east far from their home territory in the south, perhaps guarding communications between the two Mauretanias.

== Affinity ==
The Antonine Itinerary classifies the Baquates as "barbarians". The Liber generationis mundi (early 4th century) classifies the Baccuates alongside the Makanitai as Mauri, distinguishing them from the Bavares, which it classifies as Afri. The Verona List includes the Mauri bacuates among the barbarians who were under the authority of the Roman emperor in Mauretania.

== History ==
The history of relations between the Baquates and Romans can be partially reconstructed from inscriptions. There are fifteen known inscriptions that mention the Baquates. The earliest dates to between 117 and 122. A further eleven inscriptions from between 140 and 280 record meetings (colloquia) between the Baquates and the Roman authorities, six of which expressly concern the renewal of peace or of federate status.

Between 117 and 122, during the reign of the Emperor Hadrian, the Baquates raided Cartennas in the province Mauretania Caesariensis. During the succeeding reign of Antoninus Pius (138–161), the leader of the Baquates, Tuccuda, bore the title of princeps (prince) and used the Roman nomen Aelius. This indicates that he had been granted Roman citizenship and recognition as a client ruler. He dedicated an inscription to Antoninus, although whether he received his recognition from him or his predecessor is unknown.

The regular peace agreements during the following decades hint at a recurring state of war between the Baquates and Romans. In an inscription from between 173 and 175 the Baquates are found in alliance the Makanitai and in another from 235 with the Bavares. Their alliance with the Makanitai probably dates from before 168. Together they were responsible for the destruction of a Roman garrison town near Volubilis, which prompted the Romans to wall the city. At the time the Baquates' princeps was named Ucmet. He was not a Roman citizen. By 175, peace had been restored, but it had to be renewed again in 180. At that time, the Romans appointed a new princeps, granted him citizenship and took his son as a hostage to Rome. The responsible Roman procurator, Titus Flavius Piso, was promoted to prefect of Egypt. This arrangement broke down at some point before 200, because in that year a new peace agreement had to be negotiated with a princeps who was not a citizen (and whose father and predecessor as princeps had not been a citizen either).

The cause of friction between the Baquates and Romans was probably the expansion of Volubilis and the Roman occupation of lands the Baquates used as pasture. In 235, two Roman legati were dispatched with troops to crush the alliance between the Baquates and Bavares. A series of four colloquia between 239 and 245 indicate intense negotiations. The inscriptions of 277 and 280 signal a change in the status of the Baquates. Their leader is titled rex (king), indicating a rise in status, while the Roman officials are of lower rank than before, suggesting less hostility between the parties. The inscription of 280 refers to the peace as "perennial". In 284, the Roman army evacuated Volubilis, but the city was not attacked. It is most likely that the pacts of 277 and 280 concerned the impending evacuation and secured the safety of the Romanized inhabitants of the city. With the evacuation, the Baquates were probably able to take back control of their pastureland, reducing the potential for conflict.
