= Spurinna =

Spurinna may refer to:

- Titus Vestricius Spurinna (c. 24–after 105 AD), two-time Roman consul and friend of Pliny the Younger
- Members of the gens Spurinnia
- Spurinna, a haruspex who warned Julius Caesar about the Ides of March
