= Basilianus =

Basilianus may refer to:

- Julius Basilianus (fl. 218), Roman governor of Egypt
- Basilianus (beetle), beetle genus in the family Passalidae
