= Titus Aius Sanctus =

2nd century governor of Roman Egypt and consul

Titus Aius Sanctus was a Roman eques, who held several important imperial appointments then was later promoted to senatorial rank. Sanctus was consul suffectus around 185.

Paul Leunissen suggests that Sanctus came from the Italian Peninsula, speculating Sanctus was from Campania. Fergus Millar speculates that Sanctus was Commodus' teacher of rhetoric, whom the Historia Augusta calls Ateus or Attius Sanctus.

An inscription on a cippus found at Rome provides the later portion of his cursus honorum. The first attested appointment Sanctus held was ab epistulis Graecis or secretary of his Greek language correspondence; according to Millar this post formed part of the immediate entourage of the emperor. This was followed by an appointment as procurator rationis privatae, which was followed by promotion to a rationibus, the top post in the imperial secretariat. Sanctus was then appointed praefectus or governor of Roman Egypt; Giudo Bastiani dates his tenure from 179 to 180.

At some point after he returned from Egypt, Sanctus was adlected inter praetores by the emperor Commodus into the Senate. He is next attested as praefectus aerari, which was followed by his ascension to the consulate. Aius Sanctus was appointed to procurator alimentorum, which Leunissen dates to around 185/186; it is unclear whether he held this appointment before or after his consulate, although most men Leunissen lists in this appointment held it afterwards.

Political offices
Preceded by Titus Pactumeius Magnus	Prefectus of Aegyptus; 179-180	Succeeded by Titus Flavius Piso
