= Gaius Valerius Firmus =

Roman eques

Gaius Valerius Firmus was a Roman eques who held a number of military and civilian positions in the third century AD, most importantly praefectus or governor of Roman Egypt during the reign of the Emperor Philip the Arab.

Firmus is attested as governor of Egypt from May 245 to at least as late as 248; his successor, Aurelius Appius Sabinus is first attested in office September 249. His primary concern as governor of Egypt was to safeguard the harvest and delivery of grain to the populace of Rome, but surviving letters from his administration show his responsibilities extended further. One is a petition by Aurella Ammonarium that he appoint Aurelius Pluatmmon her guardian in accordance with the Lex Julia et Titia. Another is a request by one Aurelia Firmus dated 26 April 246 to depart Egypt from Pharos to return home to Side. A third, dated to 17 July of the same year, concerns the appointment of Aurelius Isidorus to serve as the deputy of Aurelius Bios (surnamed Ammonius) while Isidorus was meeting with Firmus about the assessment of the nome.

His life after he stepped down as praefectus is a blank.

Political offices
Preceded by Aurelius Basileus	Prefectus of Aegyptus; 245-248	Succeeded by Aurelius Appius Sabinus
