= Quintus Maecius Laetus =

Roman eques

Quintus Maecius Laetus was a Roman eques who flourished during the reign of the emperor Septimius Severus and his sons. He was appointed to a series of imperial offices, including praefectus or governor of Roman Egypt, and praetorian prefect. He is also known to have been consul in the year 215 as the colleague of Marcus Munatius Sulla Cerialis.

The origins of Maecius Laetus are unknown. He is documented to have been governor of Roman Egypt from 200 to 203. Eusebius alludes to a persecution of Christians during his prefecture, dating it to the tenth year of Septimius Severus' reign.

In 205 Laetus, together with Aemilius Papinianus, succeeded Gaius Fulvius Plautianus as praetorian prefect, remaining in this office until as late as 211. As a tribute to his loyalty and skill, he was adlected into the Senate, and afterwards acceded to the consulate. It is unclear whether Maecius Laetus had earlier received consular ornaments or was adlected inter consulares.

Political offices
Preceded by Quintus Aemilius Saturninus	Prefect of Egypt; 200–203	Succeeded by Claudius Julianus
Preceded by Lucius Valerius Messalla, and Gaius Octavius Appius Suetrius Sabinus	Consul of the Roman Empire; 215 with Marcus Munatius Sulla Cerialis	Succeeded by Publius Catius Sabinus II, and Publius Cornelius Anullinus
