= Marcus Rutilius Lupus =

2nd century Roman eques, official and governor of Egypt

Marcus Rutilius Lupus was a Roman eques who was active during the reign of emperor Trajan. He was appointed to a series of imperial offices, the most important of which was praefectus or governor of Roman Egypt. It was while he was governor of Egypt that a Jewish uprising known as the Kitos War began. Although Lupus successfully contained the initial revolt in Alexandria, he had to call for reinforcements from the central authorities for assistance, and the revolt was eventually crushed with enormous loss of life and property. Lupus also extended his protection to non-rebellious Jewish residents of Alexandria.

It is thought that Lupus came from Beneventum (modern Benevento), home of a number of Rutilii Lupi. One member of this family is named in the Tabula alimentaria Ligurum Baebianorum as an absentee landlord owning property in at least two pagi, where he was represented by a vilicus. Mommsen first suggested that the landowner was the same person as the eques, an identification that Arthur Stein first disagreed with, but came to accept.

== Career ==
Lupus is known to have been the Praefectus annonae, or overseer of the public dole of bread to the citizens of Rome; a bronze weight found in Ostia Antica during the excavations of the House of the Hunting Mosaic (Casa del mosaico dela caccia) bears his name. Based on this artifact, his tenure has been dated as running from around AD 107 to 111. This prefecture was the second highest position for Roman equites.

His next appointment was Prefect of Egypt, which he is attested as holding from 113 to 117. Although his primary concern as governor was to safeguard the harvest and delivery of grain to the populace of Rome, while prefect Lupus also oversaw several architectural projects in the province, including a new portico in the Oasis of Thebes that was dedicated to Isis and Serapis. The portico was constructed in the same style as the temple at Panopolis in the Thebaid, built under his predecessor Servius Sulpicius Similis. The portico displayed the following inscription:

For the fortune of the Lord Emperor Caesar Nerva Trajanus, the best, Augustus, Germanicus, Dacicus, under Marcus Rutilius Lupus, praefect of Egypt. To Sarapis and Isis, the most great gods, the inhabitants of Cysis, having decreed the building of the pylon, did it in token of their piety. In the year 19 of the Emperor Caesar Nerva Trajanus, the best, Augustus, Germanicus, Dacicus, the first of Pachon.

== Role in the brick industry ==
According to research by Bloch, Stienby and Setälä, Marcus Rutilius Lupus was one of the most important persons in the history of the Roman brick industry, and is credited with the introduction of consular dating to the urban stamps in 110. During the first decade of the second century, Rutilius, being a landowner and already a brick producer in Rome, started exploiting clay deposits near present-day Vatican known as figlinae Brutianae. Production continued there until his death, perhaps around 123. Bricks from his workshops were used in the construction of the horrea or warehouses where the imported grain was stored.

He also acquired other clay-lands, respectively figlinae Naevianae and figlinae Narnienses.

== Sources ==
- P.A. Brunt, "The Administrators of Roman Egypt", Journal of Roman Studies, 65 (1975), pp. 124–147.

== Notes ==
Political offices
Preceded by Servius Sulpicius Similis	Prefect of Egypt; 113–117	Succeeded by Quintus Rammius Martialis
