= Gaius Turranius =

Roman eques

Gaius Turranius was a Roman eques who flourished during the reign of the emperors Augustus, and Tiberius. He was appointed to a series of imperial offices, most notably the prefecture of Roman Egypt and later that of grain.

His home city was Gades (now Cádiz). In 7 BC, Turranius was appointed to prefect of Egypt and held that position until 4 BC. One of his acts in office has survived: an edict ordering the registration of Egyptian priests and what services they provide so "I may make an examination of them. Those not of the priestly order shall be removed from office without delay." The Flight into Egypt of Mary, Joseph and Jesus, is thought to have taken place during his tenure.

Turranius is attested as praefectus annonae when Tiberius succeeded Augustus on the later's death in AD 14. He is attested again in that post in 48, during the reign of Claudius. According to Seneca the Younger, Caligula relieved him from that post on account of his great age, upon which Turranius ordered his family to mourn him as if he were dead; this only ended when Claudius restored him to his prefecture.

Political offices
Preceded by Publius Rubrius Barbarus	Prefect of Aegyptus; 7 BC–4 BC	Succeeded by Publius Octavius
