= Gaius Aeterius Fronto =

Roman eques

Governor of Roman Egypt
- In office 78–79
- Preceded by: Lucius Julius Ursus
- Succeeded by: Gaius Tettius Cassianus Priscus

Personal details
- Born: c. 1st century Roman Empire
- Died: c. 1st century Roman Empire
- Occupation: Ancient Roman politician

Gaius Aeterius Fronto was a Roman eques who held a number of appointments during the reigns of the emperor Vespasian, the most important of which was praefectus or governor of Roman Egypt.

There is some controversy over the reading of his gentilicium. Louis Robert had read his name in the inscription on a bronze vase from Alexandria as "Literius", in accordance with the text of Josephus' Bellum Judaicum in some manuscripts; however, other manuscripts read "Aeterius", which is a possible reading of the bronze vase, and clearly attested in an unpublished specimen from the Oxyrhynchus Papyri according to John Rea. The current consensus is that "Aeterius" is the correct reading.

Fronto's first mention in history was following the capture of Jerusalem in AD 70. Josephus mentions that Fronto was present with troops drawn from the legions stationed in Egypt, namely Legio XXII Deiotariana and Legio III Cyrenaica, and afterwards Titus delegated to him the responsibility to pass judgment over the Jewish survivors.

He is next appears as governor of Egypt, where he is attested from 78 to 79. He have no further information about Aeterius Fronto's life after he stepped down from the prefectureship.

Political offices
Preceded by Lucius Julius Ursus	Prefectus of Aegyptus; 78-79	Succeeded by Gaius Tettius Cassianus Priscus
