= Juvenius Genialis =

Emperor of Gallienus

Juvenius Genialis was a Roman eques who is known to have held imperial appointments during the reign of the Emperor Gallienus. He is known from surviving documents written on papyrus.

The most important appointment Genialis held was praefectus or governor of Roman Egypt, where he is attested in office in 267: his predecessor, Cussonius, is attested in office in March 266, while his earliest known successor, Tenagino Probus, assumed office no earlier than 270. Genialis' primary concern as praefectus was to safeguard the harvest and delivery of grain to the populace of Rome, but surviving documents from his administration show his responsibilities extended further. One document is a petition, written by Aurelia Sarapias, asking that her brother Aurelius Sarapion be appointed guardian for her daughter.

Political offices
Preceded by Cussonius I[...]	Prefectus of Aegyptus c. 267	Succeeded by Tenagino Probus
