= Lucius Laberius Maximus =

1st century Roman governor and praetorian prefect

- Born: Lanuvium
- Died: Unknown
- Military career
- Allegiance: Roman Empire
- Service years: 84
- Rank: Praetorian prefect
- Commands: Praetorian Guard
- Other work: Prefect of Egypt in 83

Lucius Laberius Maximus was a governor of Roman Egypt in 83 CE, and prefect of the imperial bodyguard, known as the Praetorian Guard, during the reign of Roman Emperor Domitian, in 84 CE.

Prior to achieving these positions, Laberius Maximus had also successfully completed a term as Praefectus annonae, or the prefect in charge of the grain supply of Rome. Maximus attained all three of the highest offices open to members of the equestrian class.

== Family ==
Maximus was the son of another Lucius Laberius Maximus, who served as an aedile of Lanuvium.

The name of Maximus' wife is not known; however, his son has been identified. Manius Laberius Maximus, was a significant senator and military figure during the reigns of the Emperors Domitian and Trajan. Through this son Maximus was the paternal grandfather of the rich heiress Laberia Hostilia Crispina and ancestor to the Roman Empress Bruttia Crispina.

== Sources ==
Political offices
Preceded by Gaius Tettius Cassianus Priscus	Prefect of Egypt; 83	Succeeded by Gaius Septimius Vegetus
