= Gaius Tettius Cassianus Priscus =

1st century Roman imperial official and provincial governor

Governor of Roman Egypt
- In office 80–82
- Preceded by: Gaius Aeterius Fronto
- Succeeded by: Lucius Laberius Maximus

Personal details
- Born: c. 1st century Roman Empire
- Died: c. 1st century Roman Empire
- Occupation: Ancient Roman politician

Gaius Tettius Africanus Cassianus Priscus was a Roman eques who held a number of appointments during the reigns of the emperor Vespasian and his sons. Pavis d'Escurac observes that Priscus is the only known eques to hold the ranks of both praefectus vigilum (commander of the vigiles or night watch), praefectus annonae (overseer of the grain supply of Rome); Priscus was also praefectus or governor of Roman Egypt.

His progression through these three senior appointments is documented in an inscription in Asisium, now at the church di S. Pietro in Assisi, in which he is saluted at "most devout and munificent for the homeland and citizens". His name on this inscription is recorded as Gaius Tettius C.f. Ouf(entia) Africanus.

We have little information on the dates, let alone about the facts, of his tenure as commander of the vigiles or overseer of the annonae. Since his successor as praefectus annonae, Lucius Laberius Maximus, is known to have held that office in the year 80, it follows Priscus held it before that year, and commanded the vigiles for a period in the 70s.

In contrast, we are better informed about Priscus' term as governor of Egypt, which he held from 80 to 82. We have an inscription concerning a dedication he made for the emperor Titus, dated to no later than 28 August 81. Graffiti on one of the Colossi of Memnon dated to 2 December 82, gives us the name of his wife, Funisulana Vettula.

Political offices
Preceded by Gaius Aeterius Fronto	Prefectus of Aegyptus; 80-82	Succeeded by Lucius Laberius Maximus
