= Marcus Munatius Sulla Cerialis =

Roman senator (died 219)

Marcus Munatius Sulla Cerialis (died 219) was a Roman senator, who was active during the early third century AD.

He was governor of Noricum, where he is attested by an inscription dated to around 210/212. He was consul in the year 215 as the colleague of Quintus Maecius Laetus.

Where the family of Cerialis originated is a mystery; Paul Leunissen, in his prosopography of Roman consuls and other officials, includes him in a list of four consuls whose family origins are unknown, although in another passage Leunissen suggests that Cerialis is from the Italian Peninsula. Andreas Krieckhaus notes that his cognomen "Sulla" indicates Sulla Cerialis claimed descent from the Republican dictator Sulla, but offers no suggestion how he is related to him.

Concerning his cursus honorum, only one of his appointments is known: governor of the imperial province of Cappadocia, which he held under the emperor Macrinus from the year 217. Cassius Dio records that he was executed by Elagabalus in 219.

He may be the father of Marcus Munatius Sulla Urbanus, consul in 234.

Political offices
Preceded by Lucius Valerius Messalla, and Gaius Octavius Appius Suetrius Sabinus	Consul of the Roman Empire; 215 with Quintus Maecius Laetus	Succeeded by Publius Catius Sabinus II, and Publius Cornelius Anullinus
