= Lucius Julius Ursus =

Late 1st century Roman equite, senator and provincial governor

Tiberius Julius Lupus

Governor of Roman Egypt
- In office 76/77–76/78
- Preceded by: [[[S]ept[imius?] Nu[...]]]
- Succeeded by: Gaius Aeterius Fronto

Personal details
- Born: c. 1st century Roman Empire
- Died: c. 1st century Roman Empire
- Occupation: Ancient Roman politician

Lucius Julius Ursus (1st century AD) was a relative of the Flavian dynasty, who was originally one of the equites who held several imperial appointments, but afterwards was promoted to the Roman Senate. He was suffect consul three times: once under Domitian and twice under Trajan.

== Life ==
Ursus was the younger brother of Tiberius Julius Lupus; their father was Julius Lupus, the brother-in-law of the praetorian prefect Marcus Arrecinus Clemens and uncle of Arrecina Tertulla, the wife of the emperor Titus.

This connection led to Ursus being appointed to the three top equestrian posts: Praefectus annonae, or prefect of the grain supply for Rome, then praetorian prefect (81-83 AD), and governor of Roman Egypt (83-84 AD). Upon returning to Rome from Egypt, Arrecina Tertulla convinced her brother-in-law Domitian to grant a consulship to Ursus. He held the fasces for the first time in the nundinium July–August 84 AD; his colleague has not been identified.

According to Dio Cassius, Ursus was a member of Domitian's inner circle at the beginning. When Domitian, early in his reign, planned on having his wife Domitia executed for infidelity, it was Ursus who convinced him not to do so. Later, after Domitian returned home victorious from his campaigns in Germania, Ursus is recorded as "failing to show pleasure" and narrowly avoided being executed for this. After this, Ursus held no important administrative posts during Domitian's reign, but Jones believes he remained an important member of the imperial court.

Ursus must not have been too closely associated with Domitian, for after that emperor's assassination and the ascension of Trajan, Ursus was suffect consul twice more: as the colleague of Trajan in the nundinium March 98 AD; and replacing Trajan as suffect consul for January–February 100 AD with Sextus Julius Frontinus as his colleague.

== Adoption ==
Ronald Syme has argued that Ursus adopted Servius Julius Servianus, suffect consul in 90 AD, and afterwards Servianus used the name Lucius Julius Ursus Servianus, thus continuing the lineage; no scholar has spoken against this identification, and it has been considered accepted by all. Servianus remained close to the center of power, being part of the imperial courts of Trajan and Hadrian until his death.

Political offices
Preceded by Domitian X Gaius Oppius Sabinus as ordinary consuls	Roman consul 84 (suffect) with ignotus	Succeeded by Gaius Tullius Capito Pomponianus Plotius Firmus; Gaius Cornelius Gallicanus as suffect consuls
Preceded by Sextus Julius Frontinus II as suffect consul	Roman consul II; 98 (suffect) with Trajan II	Succeeded by Titus Vestricius Spurinna II as suffect consul
Preceded by Trajan III; Sextus Julius Frontinus III as ordinary consuls	Roman consul III; 100 (suffect) with Sextus Julius Frontinus III	Succeeded by Marcus Marcius Macer; Gaius Cilnius Proculus as suffect consuls
