= Claudius Julianus =

Roman eques and jurist

Claudius Julianus was a Roman eques and jurist who held a number of military and civilian positions during the reign of the Emperor Septimius Severus, most importantly praefectus or governor of Roman Egypt. His relationship to other Claudii Juliani is unknown.

Julianus is attested as praefectus annonae, or overseer of the grain rations for Rome by two inscriptions: one recovered from Rome dated January 21, 201, erected by Tiberius Julius Balbillus; and a Greek inscription found at Fiumicino, dated to the period 198–202. Julianus is the first prefect who bore the title of perfectissimus virus. He may also be the Julianus who wrote the famous letter addressed to the navicularii marini at Arles, who bore the title of praefectus annonae. The text of this letter was preserved in an inscription was found at Der el Kamar in modern Lebanon.

Although some authorities believe they are two separate men, starting with Arthur Stein this Claudius Julianus has been identified as the praefectus of Egypt from 203 to 206. His primary concern as governor of Egypt was to safeguard the harvest and delivery of grain to the populace of Rome, but surviving papers from his administration show his responsibilities extended further: emperor Septimius Severus had in addition charged him to reorganize the finances of the province. His life is a blank after he completed his service in Egypt.

Political offices
Preceded by Quintus Maecius Laetus	Prefectus of Aegyptus; 203-206	Succeeded by Tiberius Claudius Subatianus Aquila
