= Publius Octavius (Prefect of Egypt) =

Roman governor

Publius Octavius was a Roman governor during the time of emperor Augustus, in the early Roman Empire.

== Prefect of Egypt ==
Octavius served as the prefect of Egypt from around 4 BC to AD 3. He was preceded by Gaius Turanius Gracilus (c. 7 – 4 BC) and succeeded by Publius Ostorius Scapula (AD 3 – 10).

S. Rappoport refers to: "The small temple of Isis, at Tentyra, behind the great temple of Hâthor, was either built or finished in this reign, and it was dedicated to the goddess, and to the honour of the emperor as Jupiter Liberator, in a Greek inscription on the cornice, in the thirty-first year of the reign, when Publius Octavius was prefect of the province". In the text the author starts the reign of Augustus in 30 BC, which would make his 31st year equal to AD 2.

== Attestation ==
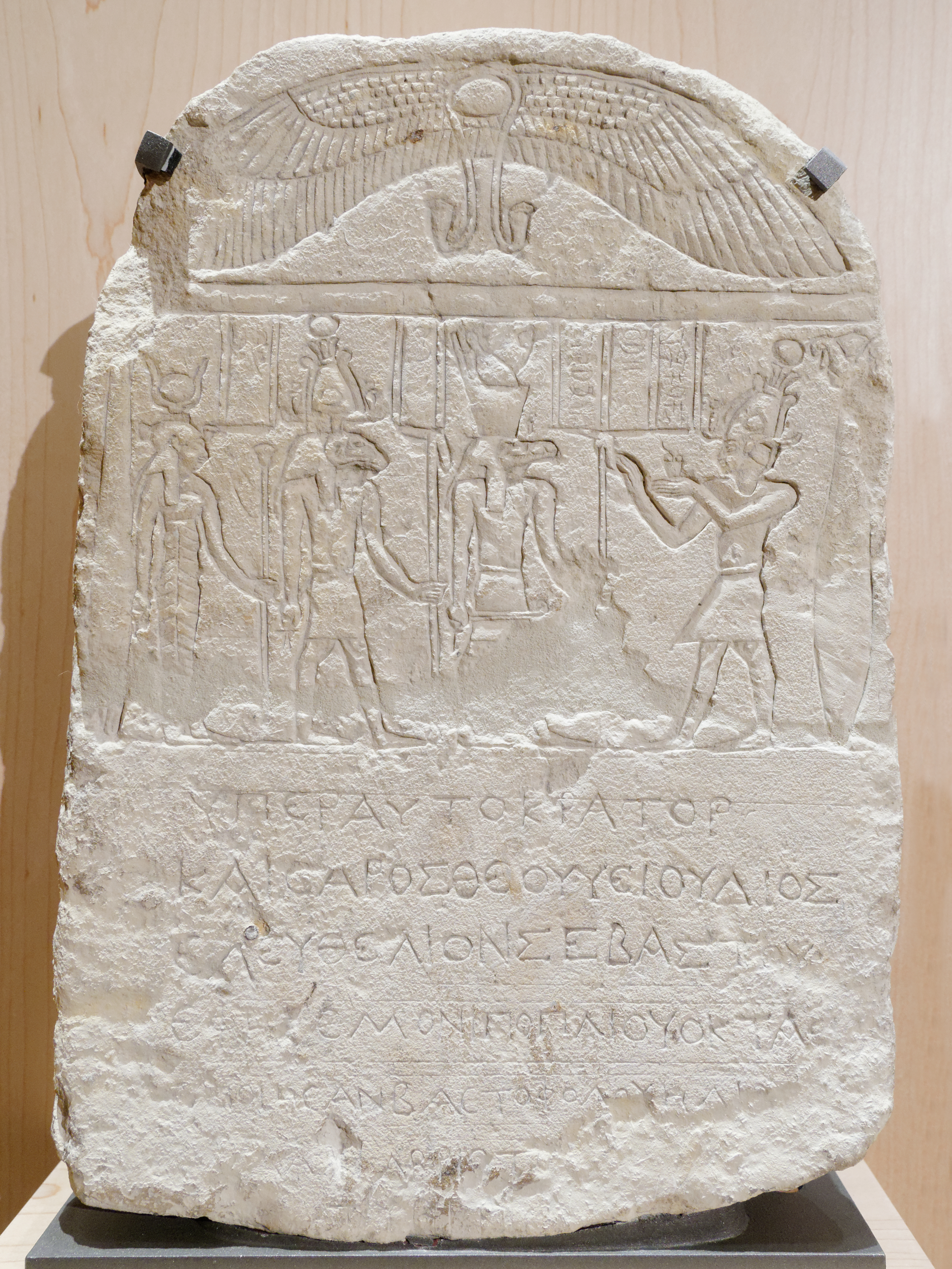
Stela August Egyptian gods Louvre E22039

From Medînet el-Faiyûm (Crocodilopolis-Arsinoë) a round-topped stela showing Augustus making offerings of incense to Sobek-Re, Lord of Shedet, with Greek dedication dated to the time of prefect Publius Octavius.

== See also ==
- List of governors of Roman Egypt

== Literature ==
- Roger S. Bagnall, "Publius Petronius, Augustan Prefect of Egypt," Yale Classical Studies 28 (1985) 85–93
- Hildegard Temporini, Aufstieg und Niedergang der römischen Welt, Parte 2, Walter de Gruyter, 1988, ISBN 0-89925-228-1, p. 365.
- S. Rappoport() History Of Egypt From 330 B.C. To The Present Time, Volume 11 (of 12)

Political offices
| Preceded by Gaius Turranius | Prefect of Aegyptus; 4 BC - 3 AD | Succeeded by Publius Ostorius Scapula |
