= Gaston Wiet =

French orientalist (1887–1971)

Gaston Wiet (18 December 1887, in Paris – 20 April 1971, in Neuilly-sur-Seine) was a 20th-century French orientalist.

== Biography ==
Wiet graduated from the Institut national des langues et civilisations orientales, and with a law degree, was boarder at the Institut Français d'Archéologie Orientale of Cairo in 1909–1911. As an assistant professor in Lyon, where he taught Arabic and Turkish, then a professor in Cairo, he was drafted in 1914, assigned to the Armée d'Orient as a second lieutenant. He ended the war with the rank of captain, decorated by the Serbian government.

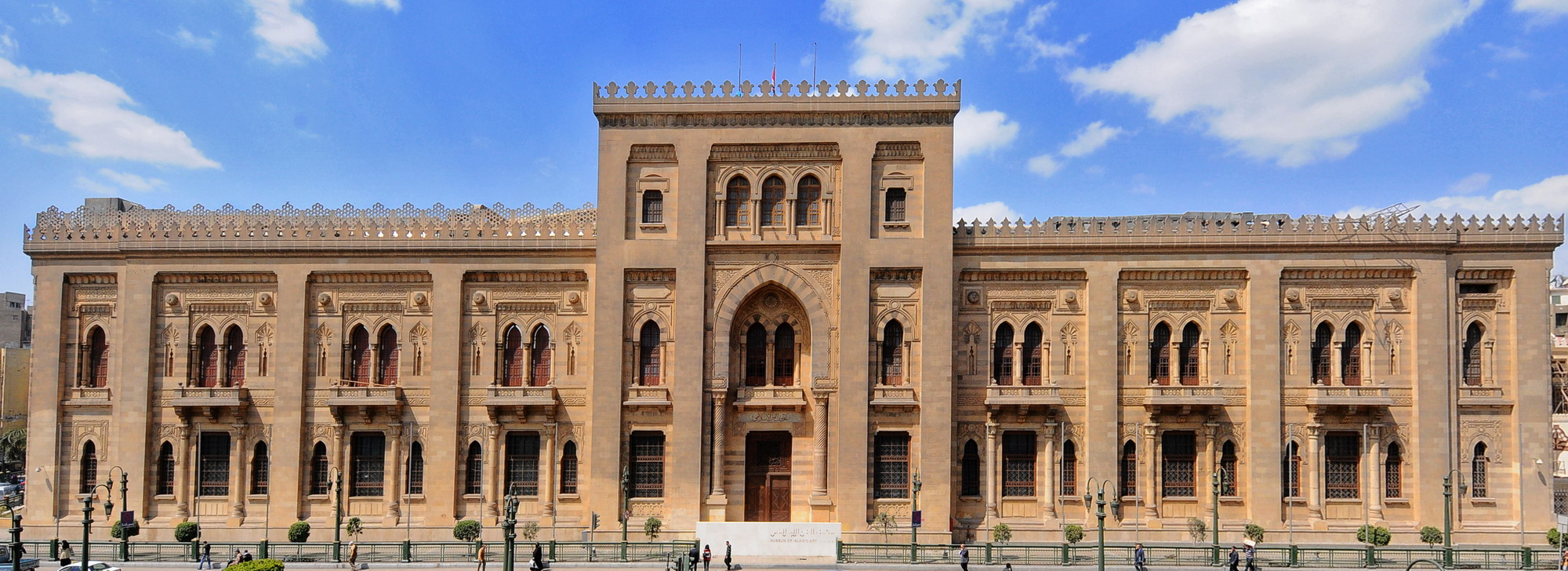
Museum of Islamic Art, Cairo today.

In 1919, he resumed his teaching activities in Lyon and Paris. In 1926 he was appointed director of the Museum of Islamic Art, a position he held until 1951. He wrote 14 of the 35 volumes of the catalog of the museum, of which he did much to enrich the collections, particularly in the areas of items of furniture and epigraphy.

In 1940, Wiet became, in Cairo, one of the most ardent supporters of Free France and général de Gaulle.

On his return to France in 1951, Wiet was appointed professor at the Collège de France (chair of Arabic language and literature), a position he held until 1959. In 1957, he was elected a member of the Académie des Inscriptions et Belles-Lettres.

== Selected bibliography ==
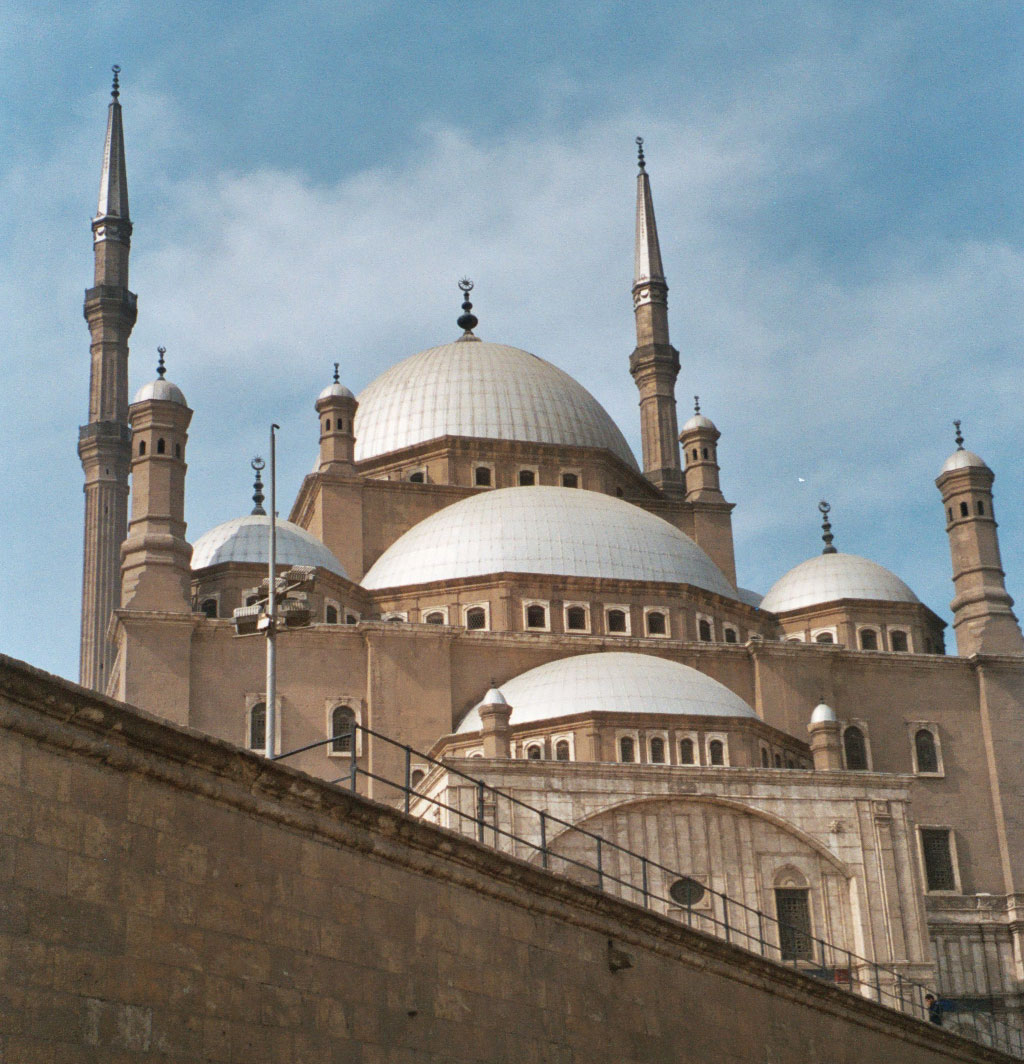
Cairo. Muhammad Ali of Egypt mosque.

- Maspero, J.; Wiet, G. (1919). MIFAO 36 1e série fasc.2 - Matériaux pour servir à la géographie de l'Égypte (in French). Cairo: Impr. de l'Institut français d'archéologie orientale.
- Wiet, G. (1930). MIFAO 52 - Matériaux pour un Corpus Inscriptionum Arabicarum Part 1 Égypte. T. 2 (in French). Cairo: Impr. de l'Institut français d'archéologie orientale.
- 1931: Répertoire chronologique d'épigraphie arabe, founded by Étienne Combe, Jean Sauvaget and Gaston Wiet, Cairo, Institut français d'archéologie orientale.
- Wiet, G. (1932). MIE 19 - Les biographies de Manhal Safi (in French). Cairo: Impr. de l'Institut français d'archéologie orientale.
- Munier, H.; Wiet, G. (1932). Précis de l'histoire d'Egypte par divers historiens et archéologues (in French). Vol. 2. Cairo: Impr. de l'Institut français d'archéologie orientale.
- 1932: Les mosquées du Caire, with Louis Hautecoeur, Paris, E. Leroux, 2 vol. (Reprint Hachette, 1966).
- Wiet, G. (1935). MIE 26 - L'épigraphie arabe de l'exposition d'art persan du Caire (in French). Cairo: Impr. de l'Institut français d'archéologie orientale.
- L'Égypte arabe, de la conquête arabe à la conquête ottomane (642–1517), Paris, Société d'histoire nationale, 1937.
- 1937: Le livre des pays (Kitâb al-Bouldân) by Ya'qûbî, presentation and translation by Gaston Wiet, Cairo, Institut français d'archéologie orientale.
- 1942: Mémoires sur l'Égypte, année 1791, Trécourt, Jean-Baptiste, edited and annotated by Gaston Wiet, Cairo, Institut Français d'Archéologie Orientale.
- Wiet, G. (1947). MIE 52 - Soieries persanes (in French). Cairo: Impr. de l'Institut français d'archéologie orientale.
- 1952: Leçon inaugurale faite le 4 décembre 1951, Collège de France, chaire de langue et littérature arabes, Paris, Collège de France.
- 1955: Ibn Iyâs, Muḥammad ibn Ahmad, Journal d'un bourgeois du Caire, chronique d'Ibn Iyâs, translated and annotated by Gaston Wiet, Paris, S.E.V.P.E.N., (Bibliothèque générale de l'École pratique des hautes études).
- 1959: Le minaret de Djâm : la découverte de la capitale des sultans ghorîdes : XIIe-XIIIe, with André Maricq, (foreword by Daniel Schlumberger), Paris, Klincksieck, (Mémoires de la Délégation archéologique française en Afghanistan, XVI).
- 1961: Gaston Wiet, Grandeur de l'Islam, de Mahomet à François Ier, Paris, Éditions de la Table ronde. (Reprint Éditions Kontre Kulture, 2014)
- 1964–1965: La configuration de la terre (Kitab Surat al-Ard) by Ibn Hauqal, translations and notes by Gaston Wiet and J.H. Kramers, Paris, Maisonneuve et Larose, 2 vol.
- 1966: Introduction à la littérature arabe, Paris, Maisonneuve et Larose.
