= Ragonia gens =

Ancient Roman family

The gens Ragonia was a plebeian family at ancient Rome. Members of this gens are first mentioned in the early decades of the Empire, but they did not become prominent until the time of Commodus, in the late second century, from which period several of them attained positions of high distinction in the Roman state.

== Origin ==
The nomen Ragonius belongs to a class of gentilicia formed using the suffix -onius, typically of plebeian origin, and frequently of Oscan ancestry. Such names were originally formed from cognomina ending in -o, but once they became common, -onius came to be regarded as a regular gentile-forming suffix, and was used in cases where it had no morphological justification.

The origin of Ragonius is obscure, but Chase suggests a possible etymological relationship to raga, a variation of braca, a harness, or, in the plural, breeches. The occurrence of the Etruscan gentilicia Urinatius and Larcius, and the Latin Tuscenius in the nomenclature of two of the earlier Ragonii might point to an Etruscan origin, but given the period at which they appear, in all probability they refer to ancestors of this family in the female line.

== Branches and cognomina ==
The Ragonii used a variety of common surnames, including Celer, swift, Celsus, tall, Clarus, bright or famous, and Priscus, elder. The only distinct family of this gens passed down the surnames Quintianus and Venustus for several generations; Quintianus was probably an old agnomen, originally belonging to someone who was adopted out of the gens Quinctia, while Venustus, which entered the family through the female line, was applied to someone charming or attractive.

== Members ==
This list includes abbreviated praenomina. For an explanation of this practice, see filiation.

- Ragonius Celer, the epistrategus, or military commander, serving under Titus Vitrasius Pollio, governor of Egypt in AD 31 and 32.
- Lucius Ragonius L. f. Urinatius Larcius Quintianus, held a number of important positions during his career, serving at various times as quaestor, praetor, legate of the fourteenth legion, and proconsul of Africa; he was consul in an uncertain year early in the reign of Commodus.
- Ragonius Celsus, said by Spartianus to have governed the Gauls during the reign of Septimius Severus. A letter mentioned by Spartianus and addressed to the emperor is probably fictitious.
- Numerius Ragonius Priscus, a soldier in the fifth cohort of the vigiles at the beginning of the third century, serving in the century of Marcus Mummius Verinus.
- Lucius Ragonius L. f. L. n. Urinatius Tuscenius Quintianus, one of the flamines, and consul in an uncertain year, circa AD 210. He married Flavia Venusta.
- Lucius Ragonius L. f. L. n. Venustus, consul in AD 240. He was probably the father or grandfather of Lucius Ragonius Quintianus, the consul of AD 289.
- Ragonius Clarus, governor of Illyricum during the reign of Valerian, whose letter to the emperor, mentioned by Trebellius Pollio, is likely an invention of the author.
- Lucius Ragonius (L. f. L. n.) Quintianus, consul in AD 289, during the reign of Diocletian.
- Ragonius Vincentius Celsus, a senator mentioned in an inscription dating to AD 389, was praefectus annonae according to inscriptions found at Ostia.
- Lucius Ragonius Venustus, performed a taurobolium, the sacrifice of a bull in honour of the Magna Mater, in AD 390.

== See also ==
- List of Roman gentes

== Bibliography ==
- Lucius Cassius Dio Cocceianus (Cassius Dio), Roman History.
- Aelius Lampridius, Aelius Spartianus, Flavius Vopiscus, Julius Capitolinus, Trebellius Pollio, and Vulcatius Gallicanus, Historia Augusta (Augustan History).
- Dictionary of Greek and Roman Biography and Mythology, William Smith, ed., Little, Brown and Company, Boston (1849).
- Theodor Mommsen et alii, Corpus Inscriptionum Latinarum (The Body of Latin Inscriptions, abbreviated CIL), Berlin-Brandenburgische Akademie der Wissenschaften (1853–present).
- Paul von Rohden, Elimar Klebs, & Hermann Dessau, Prosopographia Imperii Romani (The Prosopography of the Roman Empire, abbreviated PIR), Berlin (1898).
- Xavier Loriot, "Les consuls ordinaires de l'année 240 de notre ère" (The Consules Ordinarii of the Year 240 of Our Era), in Zeitschrift für Papyrologie und Epigraphik, vol. 12 (1973).
- Olli Salomies, Adoptive and Polyonymous Nomenclature in the Roman Empire, Societas Scientiarum Fennica, Helsinki (1992).
