= Geminius Chrestus =

Roman eques

Geminius Chrestus was a Roman eques who flourished during the earlier part of the third century AD. He was appointed to a series of military and civilian imperial offices, including praefectus or governor of Roman Egypt, and praetorian prefect.

Crestus is attested as governor of Egypt from August 219 to perhaps as late as 221; his successor, Lucius Domitius Honoratus is first attested in office in June 222.

His primary concern as governor of Egypt was to safeguard the harvest and delivery of grain to the populace of Rome, but surviving letters from his administration show his responsibilities extended further. One letter relates to the registration of a boat by one Aurelius Ptolemaeus on behalf of his young son. Following the death of the emperor Elagabalus (February 222), Chrestus was nominated or confirmed praetorian prefect along with Julius Flavianus by Elagabalus' successor, Alexander Severus. Both men were military experts, but Alexander decided to appoint the jurist Ulpian as their supervisor; as Ulpian had no military skills the choice aroused some resentment among the Praetorian Guard. According to Zosimus, Mamea learned of an attempt to overthrow Ulpian and had the attackers put to death, while Ulpian himself, according to Cassius Dio, had Flavian and Crestus put to death in late 222. Julius Paulus was appointed as Ulpian's colleague.

Political offices
Preceded by Callistianus	Prefect of Egypt; 219–221	Succeeded by Lucius Domitius Honoratus
