= Manius Acilius Aviola =

Roman statesman

Manius Acilius Aviola was a Roman senator who served as Consul ordinarius in 239 as the colleague of Emperor Gordian III. He is considered a son of the Manius Acilius Aviola who is mentioned as being present as a child at the meetings of the Arval Brethren for the years 183 and 186; as well as the descendant of the homonymous consul of AD 122.

Aviola may have owed being appointed the consul posterior to the young emperor Gordian due to his role as a leader of the senatorial opposition to Maximinus Thrax, as well as to distract senatorial ire at the murder of the patricians Pupienus and Balbinus, whom the Senate had appointed as emperors only to be murdered by partisans of Gordian.

Political offices
Preceded by Fulvius Pius, Pontius Proculus Pontianus	Consul of the Roman Empire; 239 with Gordian III	Succeeded by Gaius Octavius Appius Suetrius Sabinus, Lucius Ragonius Venustus
