= Flavianus (prefect of Egypt) =

Roman governor of Egypt

Flavianus was a Roman civil official who served as governor or prefect of Egypt (praefectus Aegypti) from 364 to 366. He was a native of Illyricum, the only one since the emperor Constantine I to hold the office. Flavianus was apparently already serving in some administrative capacity in Egypt, perhaps as praeses, before succeeding Maximus as prefect in 364. On 5 May 365 he received from the emperor Valens an edict on banished bishops, and on 8 June he sent the emperor a report seeking instructions on how to deal with the trinitarian bishop Athanasius. On 5 October 365, Flavianus, alongside the dux Victorinus, tried to arrest Athanasius, who escaped. On 1 February 366, he was instructed, through the notary Brasidas, to desist and allow Athanasius to return. Flavianus was succeeded as prefect after 21 July by Proclianus.

Political offices
| Preceded by Maximus | Prefect of Egypt; 364–366 | Succeeded by Proclianus |
