= Titus Longaeus Rufus =

Roman eques

Titus Longaeus Rufus was a Roman eques who is known to have held imperial appointments during the reign of the Emperor Commodus. He is known from inscriptions and surviving documents written on papyrus.

He is attested as holding two of the most important civil offices reserved to equites. The first was praefectus or governor of Roman Egypt, which he held for several months in 185. His primary concern as governor of Egypt was to safeguard the harvest and delivery of grain to the populace of Rome, but surviving documents from his administration show his responsibilities extended further. One records that he imposed a requisition of 20,000 artabae of barley upon a village in the Patemite nome. Another records a legal dispute he heard, involving one Dionysia and her father Chairemon: originally Dionysia and her father were at odds over money, but Chairemon then attempted to dissolve his daughter's marriage in order to gain control of both her property and dowry; although Longaeus Rufus ruled in Dionysia's favor, the dispute returned to court to be heard by his successor as praefectus, Pomponius Faustinianus.

Rufus then returned to Rome to serve as Praetorian prefect; this is attested by an inscription recovered in Alexandria that mentions both Longaeus Rufus and Titus Voconius Af[...], praefectus legionis or commander of Legio II Traiana Fortis, which was part of the garrison of Roman Egypt.

Political offices
Preceded by Vernasius Facundus	Prefectus of Aegyptus; 185	Succeeded by Pomponius Faustinianus
