= Gaius Cornelius Gallicanus =

Roman soldier

Gaius Cornelius Gallicanus was a Roman soldier of the equestrian class whom Vespasian adlected into the Roman Senate for his loyalty during the Year of the Four Emperors.

Following his adlectio, Gallicanus was governor of Baetica in AD 79/80, and shortly afterwards of Gallia Lugdunensis, succeeding Titus Tettienus Serenus in 80, until 83. He was appointed suffect consul for the nundinium of September-October 84 with Gaius Tullius Capito Pomponianus Plotius Firmus as his colleague. The pinnacle of his career was as proconsul of Africa for the period 98/99. Upon return to Italy, he was appointed curator of the alimenta for Veleia, a program that provided public funds to care for poor children in Central Italy.

Political offices
Preceded by Lucius Julius Ursus, and ignotus as suffect consuls	Suffect consul of the Roman Empire; 84 with Gaius Tullius Capito Pomponianus Plotius Firmus	Succeeded by ignotus, and Gallus as suffect consuls
