= Lucius Lusius Geta =

1st-century AD Roman politician, praetorian prefect and provincial governor

Lucius Lusius Geta (/ˈɡɛtə/ GHET-ə; fl. 1st-century AD) was a Roman politician in the 1st century AD.

== Biography ==
=== Praetorian Prefect ===
Lusius Geta belonged to the equestrian order. He was Emperor Claudius' praetorian prefect in AD 48, during the crisis of Messalina's conspiracy against Claudius. According to Tacitus, Claudius' advisors lacked confidence in Lusius Geta, thinking him too easily influenced; therefore, Claudius' chief advisor Narcissus temporarily relieved Lusius Geta of command after then-Empress Valeria Messalina entered into a bigamous marriage with Gaius Silius in an apparent conspiracy to overthrow her husband as Emperor. (See Valeria Messalina#Downfall, death and aftermath.)

However, Lusius Geta maintained the confidence of Claudius himself and remained in office as praetorian prefect until AD 51, although he shared his position with Rufrius Crispinus. In AD 51 Claudius' fourth wife Agrippina, fearing that Geta and Crispinus favored Messalina's son and imperial heir Britannicus more than her own son Nero, had the pair replaced by Sextus Afranius Burrus.

=== Prefect of Egypt ===
In 54, Claudius appointed Geta governor of Egypt (praefectus Alexandreae et Aegypti). He held this post from March 29 to November 17 of that year, when Nero (who had succeeded Claudius on October 13) recalled him to Rome.

Political offices
Preceded by Gnaeus Vergilius Capito	Prefect of Egypt c. 54	Succeeded by Tiberius Claudius Balbilus
