= Hiberus =

1st century AD Roman freedman who was briefly governor of Egypt

Hiberius (fl. 1st century AD) was an imperial freedman who assumed the duties of praefectus or governor of Roman Egypt for a few months in AD 32, from the premature death of Vitrasius Pollio to the arrival from Rome of Aulus Avilius Flaccus. He may have been a slave to Antonia Minor, wife of Drusus.

Besides Hiberus, only one other freedman served as governor of Egypt, Marcus Aurelius Epagathus.

Political offices
Preceded by Vitrasius Pollio	Prefect of Aegyptus c. 32	Succeeded by Aulus Avilius Flaccus
