= Titus Flavius Piso =

Roman eques

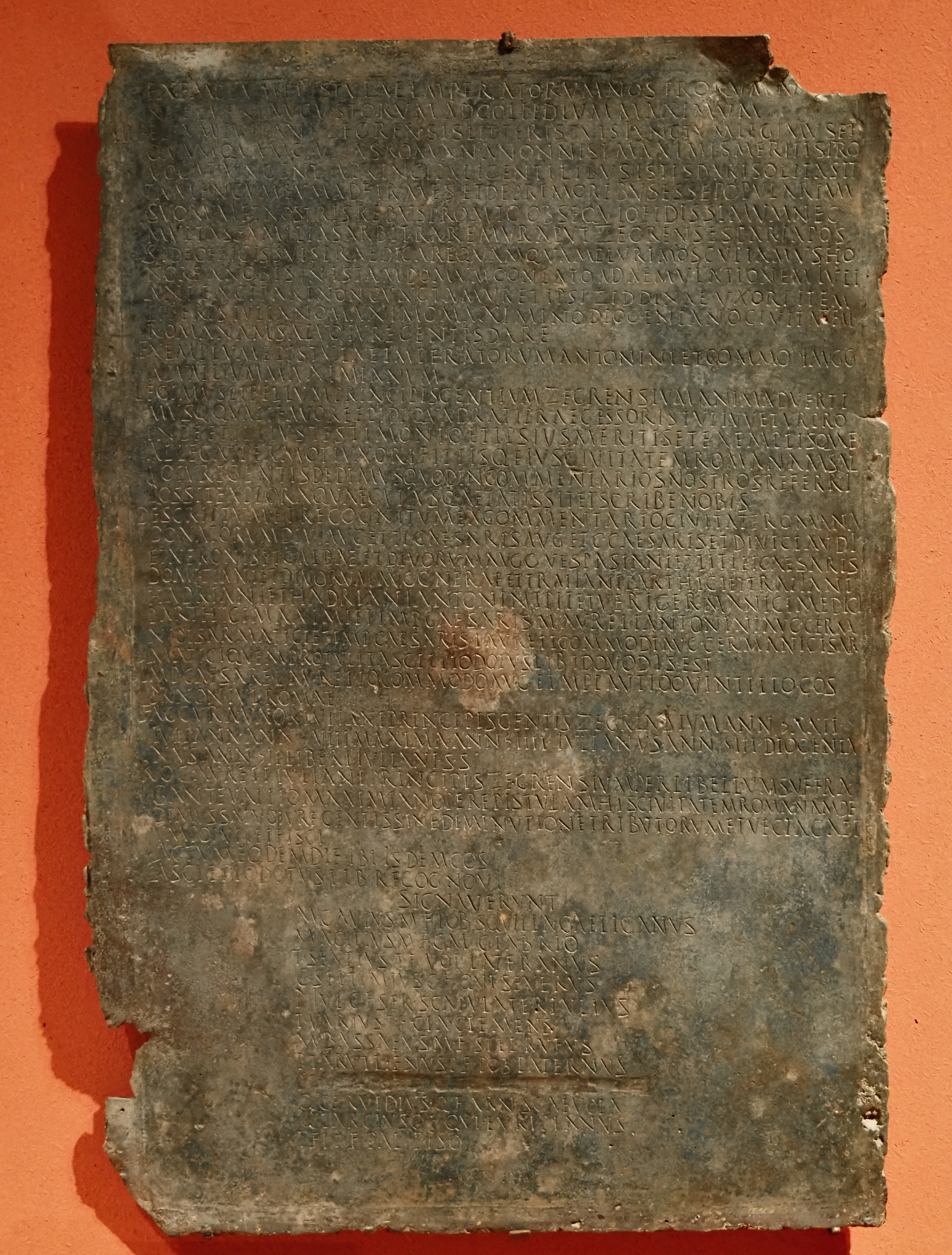
- Tabula Banasitana AE 1971, 534, dated July 6th 177, attesting him as member of the consilium principis of Marcus Aurelius

Titus Flavius Piso was a Roman eques who held at least two senior postings during the reign of the Emperors Marcus Aurelius and Commodus.

Few details of Piso's life before these two senior postings are known. One source preserves his full name Titus Flavius T.f. Pal(atina) Piso, which provides the praenomen of his father, Titus.

The first appointment Piso is known to have held is Praefectus annonae, the official responsible for the food supply of Rome. Two sources attest to this. The first is as one of the witnesses to the Tabula Banasitana, a bronze tablet dated to 6 July 177, which records the grant of Roman citizenship to a family in Mauretania Tingitana. The witnesses are drawn from the Imperial amici or senior courtiers, who include consular senators such as Marcus Gavius Squilla Gallicanus, Manius Acilius Glabrio Gnaeus Cornelius Severus, and Titus Sextius Lateranus; senior eques such as the former praetorian prefect Marcus Bassaeus Rufus, the current pretorian prefect Sextus Tigidius Perennis, prefect of the vigiles Quintus Cervidius Scaevola, and Publius Tarrutenius Paternus—as well as Flavius Piso. The second source attesting his appointment is the inscription on a statue base from Ostia Antica dated 12 May 179.

The second posting Piso held was praefectus or governor of Roman Egypt. Titus Flavius Piso held this office around the year 181.

Political offices
Preceded by Titus Aius Sanctus	Prefectus of Aegyptus; 181	Succeeded by Decimus Veturius Macrinus
