= Pinarius Valens =

Roman nobleman

Pinarius Valens was a Roman nobleman mentioned in the Historia Augusta as an older relative of Pupienus, whom the Senate elected co-emperor with Balbinus in March 238. After Pupienus ascended to the throne, he appointed Valens as praetorian prefect. His fate after the murder of the two emperors in June is unknown.
