= Philagrius (prefect of Egypt) =

Roman state official

Flavius Philagrius (Ancient Greek: Φλαούιος Φιλάγριος; fl. 330–350) was a Roman state official under the emperors Constantine I and his son Constantius II. He served two terms as governor of Egypt (335–37 and 338–40), and finally as governor of Pontus in northern Anatolia. During his term of office in Egypt, he threatened and helped exile the trinitarian bishop of Alexandria, Athanasius, on behalf of the Arians, and throughout his career he acted in support of the Arian cause against adherents of the creed of Nicaea.

== Biography ==
Flavius Philagrius (Φλαούιος Φιλάγριος) was a native of Cappadocia, and apparently belonged to an upper-class family, for, like other members of the elite in the eastern Roman provinces, he studied at Athens. Before 335 he served as a rationalis, a senior fiscal official. In 335 the Emperor Constantine appointed Philagrius as prefect (governor) of Egypt. He was the first man of senatorial rank to hold that office; the previous holders had all belonged to the equestrian order. That year, Philagrius, an Arian, assisted the Synod of Tyre in its proceedings against Athanasius, the trinitarian bishop of Alexandria. Athanasius accused Philagrius of obtaining evidence against him by threatening witnesses.

As prefect Philagrius probably oversaw a general collection of corn to supply Constantine's abortive invasion of Persia in 337, though he seems to have left office already before the Emperor's death on 22 May. He was reappointed in 338 by Constantine's son, Constantius II, to carry out the deposition of Athanasius and further the interests of the Arian party there. The prefect removed Athanasius from his see in March 339 (though he failed to arrest him) and replaced him with the fellow Cappadocian Gregory. Philagrius responded to resistance in the city by plundering and setting ablaze a church belonging to the former bishop's adherents.

In 343–344 Philagrius is attested as a comes at the court of Emperor Constantius. Following the ecumenical council of Serdica in 343, he used his position to support the Arians at Philippopolis and Adrianople in Thrace. Later in the decade he served as governor of Bithynia and Capaddocia (vicar of Pontica), with his main role there being to maintain local supply lines for the war against Persia in the eastern border. In 348, during his term of office, he helped the famous Antiochene rhetor Libanius in a lawsuit, and from then on the two became friends. He was still in office in 350, when Paul, a former bishop of Constantinople whom the Emperor had banished, died at Cucusus (Göksun), in his province.

Philagrius was married, and died before 358. He had a brother who served as governor (praeses) of Augustamnica in Egypt.

== Citations ==
Political offices
Preceded by Paternus	Prefect of Egypt; 335–337	Succeeded by Flavius Antonius Theodorus
Preceded by Flavius Antonius Theodorus	Prefect of Egypt; 338–340	Succeeded by Longinus
