= Marcus Munatius Sulla Urbanus =

Roman senator

Marcus Munatius Sulla Urbanus was a Roman senator of the 3rd century. He was consul for the year 234 as the colleague of the future emperor Pupienus. Sulla Urbanus is known entirely from inscriptions, which only attest to his consulate.

While he was always known as the colleague of the later emperor, his name was only known incompletely from a fragment of a fasti or list of magistrates recovered at Ostia Antica as [Su]lla Urbanus. More recently, two military diplomas have been published which provide his full name as Marcus Munatius Urbanus.

Based on the names, and the time between the consulates, Andreas Krieckhaus raises the possibility that Sulla Urbanus is the son of Marcus Munatius Sulla Cerialis, consul in 215. Krieckhaus admits that his cognomen "Sulla" indicates Sulla Urbanus claimed descent from the Republican dictator Sulla, but has no suggestion how he or his possible father are related to him.

Political offices
Preceded by Lucius Valerius Maximus; Gnaeus Cornelius Paternus	Roman consul 234 with Marcus Clodius Pupienus Maximus II	Succeeded by Gnaeus Claudius Severus; Lucius Titus Claudius Quintianus
