= Pomponius Januarianus =

Late 3rd-century Roman official and consul

Pomponius Januarianus (fl. 3rd century) was an aristocrat who held a number of imperial appointments, most notably consul in AD 288.

== Biography ==
Originally a member of the Equestrian order, Januarianus served as the Praefectus Aegypti from 282 to 284 under the emperor Numerian. He transferred his loyalty to the incoming emperor Diocletian, who rewarded him with advancement into high office. Sometime between 284 and 289, Januarianus was adlected into the Roman senate, and served as Praetorian prefect to Diocletian at some point.

In 288 Januarianus was granted the office of consul posterior as the colleague of the emperor Maximian. Either during his time as consul or immediately after his replacement by a suffect consul, he was appointed the Praefectus Urbi of Rome, a position he held from 27 February 288 until sometime in AD 289.

== Sources ==
- Barnes, Timothy David (1981), Constantine and Eusebius, Harvard University Press
- Bastianini, Guido (1975). "Lista dei prefetti d'Egitto dal 30^{a} al 299^{p}". Zeitschrift für Papyrologie und Epigraphik (in Italian). 17: 263–321, 323–328. JSTOR 20180880.
- Martindale, John R.; Jones, A. H. M.; Morris, John, eds. (1971). The Prosopography of the Later Roman Empire: Volume I, AD 260–395. Cambridge: Cambridge University Press. ISBN 0-521-07233-6.

Political offices
Preceded by Celerinus	Prefectus of Aegyptus; 283-284	Succeeded by Marcus Aurelius Diogenes
Preceded by Gaius Aurelius Valerius Diocletianus III, and Marcus Aurelius Valerius Maximianus	Consul of the Roman Empire; 288 with Marcus Aurelius Valerius Maximianus II	Succeeded by Marcus Magrius Bassus, and Lucius Ragonius Quintianus
