= Lucius Valerius Datus =

Third century Roman eques and governor of Egypt

Lucius Valerius Datus was a Roman eques who flourished during the reign of the emperor Septimius Severus and his sons. He held a series of imperial offices, most notably praefectus or governor of Roman Egypt from 216 to 217.

Appointed to his prefecture in Egypt by Caracalla, Datus was slow in recognizing that emperor's replacement by Macrinus. Literary sources date his ascension to 11 April 217; surviving papyri from imperial offices in Egypt are dated to years of Caracalla's reign as late as 30 June of that year, and the earliest to Macrinus' reign is dated to 17 July. A surviving papyrus document shows Datus was still in office 18 July 217.

According to Cassius Dio Macrinus had Valerius Datus executed, doubtlessly for this delay. The date of his death falls somewhere between 18 July 217 and 6 April 218, the earliest known date of his successor, Julius Basilianus.

Political offices
Preceded by Aurelius Antinous	Prefect of Egypt; 216–217	Succeeded by Julius Basilianus
