= Lucius Ragonius Venustus =

Roman aristocrat

Lucius Ragonius Venustus (fl. 3rd century) was an aristocrat of the Roman Empire. He was appointed consul ordinarius in 240. X. Loriot describes Ragonius Venustus as an example of the "new generation of clarissimi" that emerged under the reign of Alexander Severus. As the son and grandson of consuls, he attained the consulate without necessarily having served as military tribune, legate of a legion, or provincial governor, unlike his colleague Gaius Octavius Appius Suetrius Sabinus.

Loriot has traced the origins of his family. The gens Ragonia had their origins in Opitergium in Venetia et Histria. Ragonius Venustus' first ancestor to gain fame was L. Ragonius L. f. Urinatius Larcius Quintianus, who was appointed suffect consul under Commodus not long after AD 180. Larcius Quintianus' son was Lucius Ragonius Urinatius Tuscenius Quintianus, suffect consul around 210 and flamen; holding this priesthood implies Tuscenius Quintianus was also a patrician. Tuscenius Quintianus and his wife, Flavia T. f. Venusta, were the parents of Ragonius Venustus.

Loriot suggests that the consul prior of 289, Lucius Ragonius Quintianus, is either Ragonius Venustus' son, or more likely, his grandson. Another likely descendant is Lucius Ragonius Venustus who performed a taurobolium in 390.

== See also ==
- Ragonia gens

Political offices
| Preceded by Marcus Antonius Gordianus; Manius Acilius Aviola | Consul of the Roman Empire; 240 with Gaius Octavius Appius Suetrius Sabinus | Succeeded by Marcus Antonius Gordianus II; Clodius Pompeianus |
