= Rubrena gens =

Family in ancient Rome

The gens Rubrena, probably the same as Rubrenia, was an obscure plebeian family at ancient Rome. Members of this gens are mentioned in the time of Juvenal, but very few appear in history. At least one obtained the consulship some time in the latter part of the third century AD, but little else is known of this family.

== Origin ==
The nomen Rubrenus seems to belong to a class of names derived from other gentilicia using the suffix -enus in place of -inus, a Latin ending that would be more typical of cognomina. The name was most likely derived from Rubrius, from ruber, red or ruddy. The form Rubrenius, found in one inscription, may be an error, or simply an attempt to give the name a more regular ending.

== Branches and cognomina ==
The only Rubrenus mentioned in ancient authors bore the surname Lappa, a bur, belonging to a large class of cognomina derived from everyday objects, plants, and animals. The nomenclature of the consul Rubrenus, evidently inherited from a number of other families, included the common surnames Priscus, elder, and Proculus, an old praenomen, said by some of the Roman antiquarians to have been given to a child born while his father was abroad, but perhaps originally a diminutive of Proca, a name known from Roman mythology as one of the Kings of Alba Longa. Magianus, a surname derived from the Magia gens, seems to have been passed down among the Rubreni for several generations. Other surnames, including Phorus and Hylas, were of Greek origin.

== Members ==
This list includes abbreviated praenomina. For an explanation of this practice, see filiation.

- Lucius Rubrenius Hylas, dedicated a monument at Rome to his friend, Aurelia Gresia.
- Marcus Rubrenus Phorus, the husband of Saturnina, with whom he dedicated a tomb to their children at Rome.
- Rubrenus Lappa, a contemporary of Juvenal, who describes Lappa as a tragic poet of such reduced circumstances that he pawned his cloak in order to sustain himself, while working on a tragedy about Atreus.
- Rubrenus, held a number of magistracies, including praefectus frumenti dandi, (Note: The prefect in charge of the distribution of grain to the poor.) tribune of the plebs, quaestor urbanus, tribune of the second legion, and one of the decemviri stlitibus judicandis. He married Triaria Magia Secundilla, and was the father of Marcus Rubrenus Magianus, who dedicated a monument to him at Antioch in Syria, in the late first or early second century AD.
- Marcus Rubrenus Magianus, the son of Rubrenus and Triaria Magia Secundilla, dedicated a monument to his father at Antioch.
- Marcus Rubrenus Virius Priscus Pomponianus Magianus Proculus, held a number of important magistracies in the mid third century. He was one of the salii collini, patron of the colony at Atina, and curator of the colonies at Formia and Minturnae in Latium, held the consulship in an uncertain year, and was proconsul of Africa. His daughter, Junia Arria Rufina, dedicated a monument to him at Atina.

== See also ==
- List of Roman gentes

== Bibliography ==
- Decimus Junius Juvenalis, Satirae (Satires).
- Dictionary of Greek and Roman Biography and Mythology, William Smith, ed., Little, Brown and Company, Boston (1849).
- Theodor Mommsen et alii, Corpus Inscriptionum Latinarum (The Body of Latin Inscriptions, abbreviated CIL), Berlin-Brandenburgische Akademie der Wissenschaften (1853–present).
- René Cagnat et alii, L'Année épigraphique (The Year in Epigraphy, abbreviated AE), Presses Universitaires de France (1888–present).
- George Davis Chase, "The Origin of Roman Praenomina", in Harvard Studies in Classical Philology, vol. VIII, pp. 103–184 (1897).
- John C. Traupman, The New College Latin & English Dictionary, Bantam Books, New York (1995).
