= Gnaeus Vergilius Capito =

Governor of Roman Egypt from AD 48 to 52

Gnaeus Vergilius Capito was a Roman eques who flourished during the reign of the emperor Claudius. He was appointed to the important office of praefectus or governor of Roman Egypt from AD 48 to 52. His inscription erected at the Temple of Hibis at the Kharga Oasis is considered one of the best known in Egypt.

His primary concern as governor of Egypt was to safeguard the harvest and delivery of grain to the populace of Rome, but surviving letters from his administration show his responsibilities extended further. A pair of letters concern a dispute over the parentage a child; when the decision of the strategus was ignored, Capito was petitioned to enforce the ruling. A third letter from Capito dated 24 April 52 releases a weaver stricken with cataracts from the burdens of liturgy.

His inscription at the Temple of Hibis concerns travelling officials abusing the privileges of their rank. An older interpretation of this inscription believed it concerned these officials making extortionate demands upon the local population for accommodations, provisions and transport; this was a widely documented problem throughout the history of the Roman Empire. However Naphtali Lewis has shown that the abuses Capito had legislated against was not to protect the populace, but the public funds; he was prohibiting both excessive or inappropriate spending as well as claiming fictitious expenses.

Political offices
Preceded by Gaius Julius Postumus	Prefectus of Aegyptus; 48–52	Succeeded by Lucius Lusius Geta
