= Tiberius Claudius Subatianus Aquila =

Roman eques

Tiberius Claudius Subatianus Aquila was a Roman eques who flourished during the reign of the emperor Septimius Severus and his sons. He was appointed to a series of imperial offices, including praefectus or governor of Roman Mesopotamia and Roman Egypt.

Aquila was born in the North African town of Cuicul. He is known to have been the brother of Tiberius Claudius Subatianus Proculus, suffect consul in either 210 or 211; their father may have been the epistrategos Sabatianus Aquila mentioned in P. Oxy. 2708

Little is known about his career beyond the two prefectures he held for the emperor. It can be assumed that during the latest civil war Aquila sided with Septimius Severus: as Kennedy writes, "After a protracted civil war the first tasks of the victor must always have been to reward his partisans." He was appointed prefect of Mesopotamia; Kennedy argues he was the first prefect of that province and dates this appointment to c. 195. Anthony Birley notes that both Aquila and Proculus were two of a number of men from North Africa that Septimus Severus promoted to powerful positions during his reign.

His next imperial appointment was prefect of Roman Egypt: his tenure has been dated to have started after November 204 and extended as late as January/February 211. Eusebius mentions that Aquila, while governor of Roman Egypt, persecuted Christians, executing several of them. These included students of the theologian Origen.

Political offices
Preceded by Claudius Julianus	Prefect of Egypt; 200–203	Succeeded by Lucius Baebius Aurelius Juncinus
