= Lucius Mantennius Sabinus =

Roman eques

Lucius Mantennius Sabinus was a Roman eques who is known to have held imperial appointments during the reign of the Emperor Commodus. Sabinus was appointed prefect of the Roman province of Egypt by Pertinax to consolidate the latter's control over this vital source of grain for the city of Rome. His tenure ran from 192 to 194.

Sabinus' explicit connection to Pertinax and his supporters is not clear. However, Anthony Birley observes that "it was perhaps no coincidence that his [Sabinus'] wife came from Praeneste, where Pertinax's father-in-law Flavius Sulpicianus had estates."

== Further readings ==
- Anthony Birley, "The coups d'état of the year 193", Bonner Jahrbücher, 169 (1969), pp. 59-77

Political offices
Preceded by Larcius Memor	Prefectus of Aegyptus; 192-194	Succeeded by Marcus Ulpius Primianus
