= Henri Munier =

French bibliographer and coptic specialist (1884-1945)

Henri Munier (14 July 1884, Meursault (Côte-d'Or) – 19 August 1945, Cairo) was a 20th-century French bibliographer and scholar of Coptic culture.

== Biography ==
The grandson of Antoine Mourès, publisher of François Auguste Ferdinand Mariette, and son of Jules Munier, a journalist based in Cairo, Henri Munier spent the first years of his life in Burgundy, where he studied Literature.

In 1908, he was hired by Gaston Maspero, Director General of Antiquities in Egypt, as head of the Library of the new museum, which opened four years earlier. He engaged in an important work of bibliography by creating catalogs and museum index, especially Egyptology, Coptic language and archeology.

In 1924, whereas Egyptian nationality had been established (up to then Egyptians were subjects of the Ottoman Empire), civil servants could not be foreigners. King Fuad then appointed him Secretary of the Royal Geographical Society. There he continued his research in bibliography and geography. With father Bovier-Lapierre, Munier created the museum of Ethnography still opened to visits.

== Works ==
=== Egyptology ===
- Index des Annales du Service des Antiquités de l'Égypte, volumes 1 to 30, in 1912, 1921, 1931.
- Catalogue général du Service des Antiquités Égyptiennes au Musée de Caire # 9201-934, Le Caire, 1916.
- Catalogue de la Bibliothèque du Musée Égyptien du Caire, 1927-1928.

=== Geography ===
- Bulletins de la Société Royale de Géographie : voir tomes 14 à 21 (1925 to 1942)
- Géographie Historique publiée sous la direction de H Lorin, tome 2, Le Caire, 1929.

=== History ===
- Bonaparte en Égypte, Hier et Aujourd'hui, Revue du Monde Égyptien, # 12, November 1921.
- Tables de la Description de l'Égypte 1 vol in-8° de X-382, Le Caire, 1943.
- In Précis de l'Histoire d'Égypte, t. II : "L'Égypte byzantine de Dioclétien à la conquête Arabe",(p. 1–106) and (p. 295–301), Le Caire, 1932.
- in L'Égypte de Boissonas et Coll., (p. 135–144), Paris 1932.

=== Coptic archeology ===
- Numerous articles in Annales du Service des Antiquités d'Égypte between 1914 and 1924.
- Numerous articles in Bulletin de l'Institut Français d'Archéologie Orientale between 1916 and 1918.
- Numerous articles in Bulletin de la Société Archéologique d'Alexandrie, # 20 from 1924, # 22 from 1926, # 30 from 1936.
- Numerous articles in Bulletin de l'Association des Amis des Églises et de l'Art Copte (renamed Bulletin de la Société d'Archéologie Copte)

== Bibliography ==
- Munier, H. (1916). Manuscrits coptes (in French). Cairo: Impr. de l'Institut français d'archéologie orientale.
- Munier, H.; Wiet, G. (1932). Précis de l'histoire d'Egypte par divers historiens et archéologues (in French). Vol. 2. Cairo: Impr. de l'Institut français d'archéologie orientale.
- Annales du Service des Antiquités Égyptiennes tome 48, p. 285 à 298.
- Jean-Edouard Goby, Henri Munier Bibliographe et coptisant, Le Caire, Imprimerie Française, 1951.
- Musée du Caire, Bibliothèque, Réf : AD 308, 310, 312, 313, 524, et G 38.
- Documents des familles Munier et Costagliola.
- Informations de J. Grosdidier de Matons à Washington et de P. Costagliola à Besançon
