= Rubria gens =

Ancient Roman family

The gens Rubria was a plebeian family at ancient Rome. Members of this gens are first mentioned in the time of the Gracchi, but they did not rise to prominence until imperial times. The first of the Rubrii to obtain the consulship was Rubrius Gallus, some time before AD 68.

== Origin ==
The nomen Rubrius is derived from the Latin ruber, red or ruddy. Chase classifies it among those gentilicia that either originated at Rome, or cannot be shown to have come from anywhere else. The nomen Rubrena was probably derived from it using the suffix -enus, which was typically applied to form names from other gentilicia.

== Praenomina ==
The Rubrii used a variety of praenomina, including Gaius, Lucius, Marcus, Publius, Quintus, and Titus, all of which were among the most common names throughout Roman history.

== Branches and cognomina ==
The Rubrii of the Republic bore the cognomina Dossenus, Ruga, and Varro, of which Dossenus is known only from coins. Other surnames are found in imperial times. A number of Rubrii had no cognomen. Of these, Gallus, a cockerel, and Nepos, grandson, seem to have represented distinct families, each of whom rose to the consulship during the latter part of the first century.

== Members ==
This list includes abbreviated praenomina. For an explanation of this practice, see filiation.

- Gaius Rubrius C. f., one of the senators named in the Senatus Consultum de Agro Pergameno, an inscription tentatively dated about 123 BC. (Note: But according to some scholars, a generation later.) He might be the same as Gaius Rubrius, tribune of the plebs in 122.
- Gaius Rubrius, tribune of the plebs in 122 BC, introduced the lex Rubria, establishing a colony at Carthage, as part of the ambitious program of reforms proposed by Gaius Gracchus. He was probably also the author of the lex Rubria Acilia, together with his colleague, Manius Acilius Glabrio.
- Quintus Rubrius Varro, described by Cicero as an enthusiastic prosecutor in the law courts, was one of those outlawed by Sulla in 88 BC, along with Gaius Marius.
- Rubrius, an ally of Verres, whose intelligence led Verres to the house of Philodamus at Lampsacus, where Rubrius' men attempted to seize his host's beautiful daughter, and Rubrius himself scalded Philodamus by pouring boiling water on him. A riot ensued in which Verres barely escaped with his life, but his influence was such that Philodamus and his son were executed for the murder of Verres' lictor.
- Publius Rubrius, prosecuted Quintus Apronius, a notorious plunderer who flourished under the government of Verres in Sicily.
- Quintus Rubrius, an eques, and one of the wealthy residents of Sicily, whom Verres sought to influence by bestowing gifts and honours upon him. Cicero contrasts Rubrius' courage, dignity, and virtue with the sordid character and conduct of Verres.
- Rubrius, propraetor in Macedonia circa 67 BC. Cato was a military tribune in his command.
- Rubria, mentioned by Cicero as the mother of his friend, Gaius Papirius Carbo.
- Lucius Rubrius, a senator captured by Caesar at Corfinium early in the Civil War. Caesar released him unharmed.
- Marcus Rubrius, one of Cato's companions at Utica, where Cato fell on his sword after the Battle of Thapsus.
- Rubrius Ruga, one of the assassins of Caesar in 44 BC. It is uncertain whether he should be identified with the senator Lucius Rubrius, or perhaps Marcus Rubrius, the friend of Cato.
- Lucius Rubrius, a resident of Casinum, left his estate to Marcus Antonius.
- Publius Rubrius M. f. Barbarus, governor of Egypt circa 13 to 12 BC.
- Rubria, claimed an estate at Mediolanum in the time of Augustus; her claim was denied on the grounds that she was an impostor.
- Rubrius, an eques accused of perjuring himself before the deified Augustus, early in the reign of Tiberius. The emperor decided that Augustus would have to be the judge of whether he had been wronged, and what penalty to exact.
- Rubrius Fabatus, one of the equites suspected of having conspired with Sejanus. After the latter's downfall, when his associates were being imprisoned, Rubrius was apprehended near the Strait of Sicily, where it was thought he might be attempting to flee to Parthia. He escaped punishment due largely to the emperor's forgetfulness.
- Titus Rubrius Nepos, either the colleague of, or an assistant to Aulus Didius Gallus, when the latter was curator aquarum, or superintendent of the aqueducts, from AD 38 to 49.
- Rubria Ichmas, perhaps a freedwoman, was nurse to the daughters of the prefect Barbarus, and was buried at Rome, aged fifty, with a monument from Daphnus, the storehouse keeper of Titus Rubrius Nepos.
- Rubrius Pollio, commander of a cohort of the Praetorian Guard during the reign of Claudius. As a sign of favour, Rubrius was permitted a seat in the senate whenever the emperor was in attendance.
- Rubrius, a physician active at Rome, probably in the early or middle first century. Pliny relates that he earned two hundred and fifty thousand sestertii per year, a very large amount.
- Rubrius, an actor mentioned by Pliny the Elder, who bore a striking resemblance to Lucius Munatius Plancus, whose namesake he became.
- Rubria, a Vestal Virgin, whom Nero debauched, in violation of her vow of celibacy.
- Rubrius Gallus, consul before AD 68, was an ally of Otho, and then of Vespasian. He convinced Aulus Caecina Alienus, one of the generals of Vitellius, to espouse Vespasian's side, but his soldiers refused to join him, and put Caecina in chains. Vespasian sent Rubrius against the Sarmatians, whom he defeated. He may have been the father of Gaius Rubrius Gallus, consul suffectus circa AD 101.
- Titus Rubrius Aelius Nepos, consul suffectus from the Kalends of September in AD 79.
- Rubrius Gallus, consul suffectus circa AD 101.

== See also ==
- List of Roman gentes

== Bibliography ==
- Marcus Tullius Cicero, Brutus, Epistulae ad Familiares, In Verrem, Philippicae.
- Gaius Julius Caesar, Commentarii de Bello Civili (Commentaries on the Civil War).
- Dionysius of Halicarnassus, Romaike Archaiologia.
- Titus Livius (Livy), History of Rome.
- Valerius Maximus, Factorum ac Dictorum Memorabilium (Memorable Facts and Sayings).
- Gaius Plinius Secundus (Pliny the Elder), Historia Naturalis (Natural History).
- Flavius Josephus, Bellum Judaïcum (The Jewish War).
- Publius Cornelius Tacitus, Annales, Historiae.
- Lucius Mestrius Plutarchus (Plutarch), Lives of the Noble Greeks and Romans.
- Gaius Suetonius Tranquillus, De Vita Caesarum (Lives of the Caesars, or The Twelve Caesars).
- Appianus Alexandrinus (Appian), Bellum Civile (The Civil War).
- Lucius Cassius Dio Cocceianus (Cassius Dio), Roman History.
- Gaius Julius Solinus, De Mirabilis Mundi (On the Wonders of the World).
- Dictionary of Greek and Roman Biography and Mythology, William Smith, ed., Little, Brown and Company, Boston (1849).
- Theodor Mommsen et alii, Corpus Inscriptionum Latinarum (The Body of Latin Inscriptions, abbreviated CIL), Berlin-Brandenburgische Akademie der Wissenschaften (1853–present).
- René Cagnat et alii, L'Année épigraphique (The Year in Epigraphy, abbreviated AE), Presses Universitaires de France (1888–present).
- George Davis Chase, "The Origin of Roman Praenomina", in Harvard Studies in Classical Philology, vol. VIII, pp. 103–184 (1897).
- Paul von Rohden, Elimar Klebs, & Hermann Dessau, Prosopographia Imperii Romani (The Prosopography of the Roman Empire, abbreviated PIR), Berlin (1898).
- T. Robert S. Broughton, The Magistrates of the Roman Republic, American Philological Association (1952–1986).
- E. Mary Smallwood, Documents Illustrating the Principates of Nerva, Trajan, and Hadrian, Cambridge University Press (1966).
- Paul A. Gallivan, "Some Comments on the Fasti for the Reign of Nero", in Classical Quarterly, vol. 24, pp. 290–311 (1974), "The Fasti for A.D. 70–96", in Classical Quarterly, vol. 31, pp. 186–220 (1981).
- Judith R. Ginsburg, "Nero's Consular Policy", in American Journal of Ancient History, vol. 6 (1981).
- John C. Traupman, The New College Latin & English Dictionary, Bantam Books, New York (1995).
