= Praetorian prefect =

High office in the Roman Empire

The praetorian prefect (Latin: praefectus praetorio; Greek: ἔπαρχος/ὕπαρχος τῶν πραιτωρίων) was a high office in the Roman Empire established by Emperor Augustus in 2 BC. Originating as the commander of the Praetorian Guard, the office gradually acquired extensive legal and administrative functions, with its holders becoming the Emperor's chief aides. Under Constantine I, the office was much reduced in power and transformed into a purely civilian administrative post, while under his successors, territorially defined praetorian prefectures emerged as the highest-level administrative division of the Empire. The prefects again functioned as the chief ministers of the state, with many laws addressed to them by name. In this role, praetorian prefects continued to be appointed by the Eastern Roman Empire (and the Ostrogothic Kingdom) until the reign of Heraclius in the 7th century AD, when wide-ranging reforms reduced their power and converted them to mere overseers of provincial administration. The last traces of the prefecture disappeared in the Byzantine Empire by the 840s.

The term praefectus praetorio was often abbreviated in inscriptions as "PR PR" or "PPO".

== History ==
=== Commander of the Praetorian Guard ===
Under the empire the praetorians or imperial guards were commanded by one, two, or even three praefects (praefecti praetorio), who were chosen by the emperor from among the equites and held office at his pleasure. From the time of Alexander Severus the post was open to senators also, and if an equestrian was appointed he was at the same time raised to the senate. Down to the time of Constantine, who deprived the office of its military character, the prefecture of the guards was regularly held by tried soldiers, often by men who had fought their way up from the ranks. In course of time the command seems to have been enlarged so as to include all the troops in Italy except the corps commanded by the city praefect (cohortes urbanae).

The special position of the praetorians made them a power in their own right in the Roman state, and their prefect, the praefectus praetorio, soon became one of the more powerful men in this society. The emperors tried to flatter and control the praetorians, but they staged many coups d'état and contributed to a rapid rate of turnover in the imperial succession. The praetorians thus came to destabilize the Roman state, contrary to their purpose. The praetorian prefect became a major administrative figure in the later empire, when the post combined in one individual the duties of an imperial chief of staff with direct command over the guard also. Diocletian greatly reduced the power of these prefects as part of his sweeping reform of the empire's administrative and military structures.

=== Transformation to administrator ===
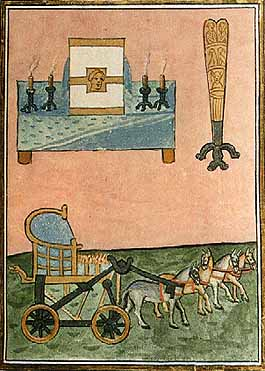
The insignia of the praetorian prefect of Illyricum, as depicted in the Notitia Dignitatum: the ivory inkwell and pen case (theca), the codicil of appointment to the office on a blue cloth-covered table, and the state carriage.

In addition to his military functions, the praetorian prefect came to acquire jurisdiction over criminal affairs, which he exercised not as the delegate but as the representative of the emperor. By the time of Diocletian he had become a kind of grand-vizier as the emperor's vice-regent and 'prime minister.' Constantine removed active military command in 312. The prefect remained as chief quarter-master general responsible for the logistical supply of the army. The prefect was the chief financial officer whose office drew up the global imperial budget. His office drew up the state liturgical obligations laid on the richer inhabitants of the Empire. He ceased to be head of administration which had to be shared with the master of the offices attached to the palace. Constantine in 331 confirmed that from the sentence of the praetorian praefect there should be no appeal. A similar jurisdiction in civil cases was acquired by him not later than the time of Septimius Severus. Hence a knowledge of law became a qualification for the post, which under Marcus Aurelius and Commodus, but especially from the time of Severus, was held by the first jurists of the age, (e.g. Papinian, Ulpian, Paulus) and, under Justinianus, John the Cappadocian, while the military qualification fell more and more into the background.

The tetrarchy reform of Diocletian (c. 296) multiplied the office: there was a praetorian prefect as chief of staff (military and administrative)—rather than commander of the guard—for each of the two Augusti, but not for the two Caesars. Each praetorian prefect oversaw one of the four quarters created by Diocletian, which became regional praetorian prefectures for the young sons of Constantine ca 330 A.D. From 395 there were two imperial courts, at Rome (later Ravenna) and Constantinople, but the four prefectures remained as the highest level of administrative division, in charge of several dioceses (groups of Roman provinces), each of which was headed by a Vicarius.

Under Constantine I, the institution of the magister militum deprived the praetorian prefecture altogether of its military character but left it the highest civil office of the empire.

=== Post-imperial era ===
With the fall of the western part of the Empire into the hands of warlords, these, in order to have support in their new domains, recognized the supremacy of the emperor of the eastern part, reuniting at least de iure the Empire under him, the prefectures were maintained as a way of delimiting the new viceroyalties:

- First Flavius Odoacer and later Flavius Theodoricus were granted the prefecture of Italy;
- Louis I was recognized as the prefect of Gaul (which served him as a pretext to seize the Visigoths' territories in Gaul);
- the Visigoths were recognized for their dominion over the prefecture of Hispania;
- and the Vandals theirs over Africa.

This recognition would be maintained until the rise of Justinian I, who ended the Ostrogothic and Vandal domains, but continued to recognize the Franks (as they were both Catholics) and the Visigoths (due to the lack of strength to continue the Recuperatio Imperii, but managing to establish a pro-Byzantine king, Athanagild, and the conquest of Spania).

== List of known prefects of the Praetorian Guard ==
The following is a list of all known prefects of the Praetorian Guard, from the establishment of the post in 2 BC by Augustus until the abolishment of the Guard in 312. The list is presumed to be incomplete due to the lack of sources documenting the exact number of persons who held the post, what their names were and what the length of their tenure was. Likewise, the Praetorians were sometimes commanded by a single prefect, as was the case with for example Sejanus or Burrus, but more often the emperor appointed two commanders, who shared joint leadership. Overlapping terms on the list indicate dual command.

=== Julio-Claudian dynasty (2 BC – AD 68) ===
Prefect	Tenure	Emperor served
Publius Salvius Aper	2 BC –??	Augustus
Quintus Ostorius Scapula	2 BC – ??	Augustus
Publius Varius Ligur	??	Augustus
Lucius Seius Strabo	??–15	Augustus, Tiberius
Lucius Aelius Sejanus	14–31	Tiberius
Quintus Naevius Sutorius Macro	31–38	Tiberius, Caligula
Marcus Arrecinus Clemens	38–41	Caligula
Lucius Arruntius Stella	38–41	Caligula
Rufrius Pollio	41–44	Claudius
Catonius Justus	41–43	Claudius
Rufrius Crispinus	43–51	Claudius
Lucius Lusius Geta	44–51	Claudius
Sextus Afranius Burrus	51–62	Claudius, Nero
Lucius Faenius Rufus	62–65	Nero
Gaius Ofonius Tigellinus	62–68	Nero
Gaius Nymphidius Sabinus	65–68	Nero

=== Year of the Four Emperors (AD 68–69) ===
Prefect	Tenure	Emperor served
Cornelius Laco	68–69	Galba
Plotius Firmus	69	Otho
Licinius Proculus	69	Otho
Publius Sabinus	69	Vitellius
Alfenius Varus	69	Vitellius
Junius Priscus	69	Vitellius

=== Flavian dynasty (AD 69–96) ===
Prefect	Tenure	Emperor served
Arrius Varus	69–70	Vespasian
Marcus Arrecinus Clemens	70–71	Vespasian
Tiberius Julius Alexander (?)	69–??	Vespasian
Titus Flavius Vespasianus	71–79	Vespasian
Lucius Julius Ursus	81–83	Domitian
Cornelius Fuscus	81–87	Domitian
Lucius Laberius Maximus	83–84	Domitian
Casperius Aelianus	84–94	Domitian
Titus Flavius Norbanus	94–96	Domitian
Titus Petronius Secundus	94–97	Domitian

=== Five Good Emperors to Didius Julianus (AD 96–193) ===
Prefect	Tenure	Emperor served
Casperius Aelianus	96–98	Nerva
Sextus Attius Suburanus	98–101	Trajan
Tiberius Claudius Livianus	101–117?	Trajan
Publius Acilius Attianus	117–120	Trajan, Hadrian
Servius Sulpicius Similis	112–123	Trajan, Hadrian
Gaius Septicius Clarus	120–123	Hadrian
Quintus Marcius Turbo	120–137	Hadrian
Marcus Petronius Mamertinus	138–143	Hadrian, Antoninus Pius
Marcus Gavius Maximus	138–158	Hadrian, Antoninus Pius
Gaius Tattius Maximus	158–160	Antoninus Pius
Sextus Cornelius Repentinus	160–166/7	Antoninus Pius
Titus Furius Victorinus	159–168	Antoninus Pius, Marcus Aurelius
Titus Flavius Constans	c. 168	Marcus Aurelius
Marcus Macrinius Vindex	168–172	Marcus Aurelius
Marcus Bassaeus Rufus	168–177	Marcus Aurelius
Publius Tarrutenius Paternus	by 179–182	Marcus Aurelius, Commodus
Sextus Tigidius Perennis	180–185	Commodus
Pescennius Niger	c. 185	Commodus
Marcius Quartus	185	Commodus
Titus Longaeus Rufus	185–187	Commodus
Publius Atilius Aebutianus	185–187	Commodus
Marcus Aurelius Cleander	187–189	Commodus
Lucius Julius Vehilius Gratus Julianus	188–189	Commodus
Regillus	189	Commodus
Motilenus	190	Commodus, Pertinax, Didius Julianus
Quintus Aemilius Laetus	192–193	Commodus, Pertinax, Didius Julianus
Titus Flavius Genialis	193	Didius Julianus
Tullius Crispinus	193	Didius Julianus

=== Severan dynasty (AD 193–235) ===
Prefect	Tenure	Emperor served
Flavius Juvenalis	193–197?	Didius Julianus, Septimius Severus
Decimus Veturius Macrinus	193–197?	Didius Julianus, Septimius Severus
Gaius Fulvius Plautianus	197–205	Septimius Severus
Quintus Aemilius Saturninus	200	Septimius Severus
Marcus Aurelius Julianus	c. 200/205	Septimius Severus, Caracalla
Marcus Flavius Drusianus	c. 204/204	Septimius Severus, Caracalla
Aemilius Papinianus	205–211	Septimius Severus, Caracalla
Quintus Maecius Laetus	205–215?	Septimius Severus, Caracalla
Valerius Patruinus	211?–212	Caracalla
Gnaeus Marcius Rustius Rufinus	212–217	Caracalla
Marcus Oclatinius Adventus	215–217	Caracalla
Marcus Opellius Macrinus	214–217	Caracalla
Ulpius Julianus	217–218	Macrinus
Julianus Nestor	217–218	Macrinus
Julius Basilianus	218	Elagabalus
Publius Valerius Comazon	218–221	Elagabalus
Flavius Antiochianus	221–222	Elagabalus
Flavianus	222–2??	Alexander Severus
Geminius Chrestus	222–2??	Alexander Severus
Gnaeus Domitius Annius Ulpianus	222–223/228	Alexander Severus
Lucius Domitius Honoratus	223–2??	Alexander Severus
Marcus Aedinius Julianus	223–2??	Alexander Severus
Marcus Attius Cornelianus	c. 230	Alexander Severus
Julius Paulus	228–235	Alexander Severus

=== Crisis of the Third Century (AD 235–285) ===
Prefect	Tenure	Emperor served
Vitalianus	238	Maximinus Thrax
Annullinus	2??–238	Maximinus Thrax
Pinarius Valens	238	Pupienus; Balbinus
Domitius	before 240 – 2??	Gordian III
Gaius Furius Sabinius Aquila Timesitheus	241–244	Gordian III
Gaius Julius Priscus	242–246	Gordian III; Philip the Arab
Philip the Arab	243–244	Gordian III
Quintus Herennius Potens	249–251	Decius?
Successianus	254–255/260	Valerian
Silvanus	2?? – c. 260	Gallienus
Lucius Petronius Taurus Volusianus	c. 260	Gallienus
Callistus Ballista	260–261	Macrianus, Quietus
Marcus Aurelius Heraclianus	268	Gallienus
Julius Placidianus	c. 270	Aurelian
Marcus Annius Florianus	275–276	Tacitus
Marcus Aurelius Carus	276–282	Probus
Lucius Flavius Aper	284	Numerian
Marcus Aurelius Sabinus Julianus	c. 283? – c. 284	Carinus
Titus Claudius Aurelius Aristobulus	285	Carinus; Diocletian

=== Tetrarchy to Constantine I (AD 285–324) ===
Prefect	Tenure	Emperor served
Afranius Hannibalianus	286/292	Diocletian
Asclepiades	303	(at Antioch)
Pomponius Januarianus	285/286	Maxentius
Julius Asclepiodotus	290–296	Diocletian; Constantius Chlorus
Constantius Chlorus	?? – ??	Diocletian
Manlius Rusticianus	306–310	Maxentius
Gaius Ceionius Rufius Volusianus	309–310	Maxentius
Ruricius Pompeianus	3??–312	Maxentius
Tatius Andronicus	310	Galerius
Pompeius Probus	310–314	Licinius
Petronius Annianus	315–317	Constantine I
Julius Julianus	315–324	Licinius
Junius Annius Bassus	318–331	Constantine I

== See also ==
For praetorian prefects after the reformation of the office by emperor Constantine I, see:

- Praetorian prefecture of Italy
- Praetorian prefecture of Gaul
- Praetorian prefecture of the East
- Praetorian prefecture of Illyricum

A further prefecture was established by emperor Justinian I in the 6th century:

- Praetorian prefecture of Africa
