= Quintus Aemilius Saturninus =

Roman member of the equites class (died 200 AD)

Quintus Aemilius Saturninus (died AD 200) was an ancient Roman member of the equites class, who held several positions under the emperors Commodus and Septimius Severus. These included Prefect of Roman Egypt (197–200), and Praetorian prefect (200).

As governor of Egypt his primary concern was to safeguard the harvest and delivery of grain to the populace of Rome, but surviving documents from his administration show his responsibilities extended further. These documents include a series of petitions from Gemellus Horion, a resident of Karanis, dated to 197 wherein he complains that two brothers Julius and Sotas prevented him from harvesting land he had inherited from his sister; their efforts included breaking all of the doors of Gemellus' house.

Saturninus had a violent end to his life. The contemporary praetorian prefect, Gaius Fulvius Plautianus, took exception to having a colleague and not long after Aemilius Saturninus was appointed, Plautianus had him killed.

Political offices
| Preceded by Marcus Ulpius Primianus | Prefect of Aegyptus; 197–200 | Succeeded by Quintus Maecius Laetus |
