= Julius Basilianus =

Third century Roman eques and governor of Egypt

Julius Basilianus was a Roman eques who held a series of imperial offices during later Severan dynasty. He was praefectus or governor of Roman Egypt in 218 before Macrinus appointed him praetorian prefect.

Nothing is known of Basilianus before he became governor of Egypt, where he is first attested 6 April 218; presumably he was appointed to replace Lucius Valerius Datus, who had been murdered for not recognizing Macrinus as emperor promptly enough. An inscription erected at Elephantine in Upper Egypt by the auxilia III Cohors Cilicum mentions both Basilianus as governor, and Diadumenianus as "most noble Caesar [and] first youth", which attests to the loyalty of at least that unit to Macrinus.

Following the death in battle of the praetorian prefect Julianus (either Ulpius Julianus or Julianus Nestor), Macrinus appointed Basilianus to replace him. His assistant Marius Secundus assumed responsibility for Egypt. However, the dissolution of Macrinus' rule outraced Basilianus' ability to act: on 8 June Macrinus and soldiers loyal to him were defeated outside Antioch; Basilianus, still in Egypt, fled the province; according to Cassius Dio, he was caught in Brundisium in Italy, having been betrayed by a friend in Rome to whom he had secretly solicited for food. Julius Basilianus was then sent to Nicomedia, where he was later executed.

Political offices
Preceded by Lucius Valerius Datus	Prefect of Egypt; 218	Succeeded by Callistianus
