= Gaius Octavius Appius Suetrius Sabinus =

3rd century Roman senator, consul and military officer

Gaius Octavius Appius Suetrius Sabinus (fl. 3rd century) was a Roman senator and military officer who was appointed consul twice, firstly in AD 214, and secondly in AD 240.

== Biography ==
Originating from the town of Histonium, and the son of a senator, Suetrius Sabinus began his senatorial career under the reign of the emperor Septimius Severus. His first role was as a member of the Decemviri Stlitibus Iudicandis which he filled around AD 193 or 194. He then stood as one of the imperial candidates for the office of Quaestor in AD 201, before again standing for the office of Plebeian Tribune in AD 203. He was eventually elected to the office of praetor de liberalibus causis in AD 206.

Suetrius Sabinus was next sent as a Legatus to Africa before returning to Rome to act as curator viarum viae Latinae novae (or curator of the Via Latina) from AD 209 to 210. His next posting was as iuridicus per Aemiliam et Liguriam, which he held from AD 210 to 211.

Suetrius Sabinus then served under the new emperor Caracalla during his campaign against the Alamanni from AD 211 to 213. At first he was a Legatus legionis of the Legio XXII Primigenia, serving in Germania Superior before he was promoted to the rank of praepositus vexillarii of Legio XI Claudia. By AD 213, he was the Comes in expeditione Germanica (or head of the expedition against the Germanic tribes) before being appointed for a three-month stint as imperial legate of the province of Raetia, serving from October to December 213.

An amicus (or intimate friend) of the emperor Caracalla, Suetrius Sabinus was appointed consul ordinarius alongside Lucius Valerius Messalla Apollinaris in AD 214. The fact that his first consulate was an ordinary one, not suffect, reinforces the notion that he was held in high regard by Caracalla. After his consulship, Caracalla appointed Suetrius Sabinus as a iudex (judge representing the emperor) in an unknown province, followed by a period as praefectus alimentorum (or the officer in charge of Rome's food supply).

Suetrius Sabinus next served as a Corrector, under the title of electus ad corrigendum statum Italiae, from AD 215 to 216. This was an exceptional appointment in terms of its function; it may be that his principal task was to deal with a breakdown of law and order in Italy during that time, with a rise in banditry afflicting the countryside. It is also possible that he was tasked with fixing the finances in the Italian communities, as the effects of Caracalla's taxes were causing major difficulties throughout Italy.

From AD 216 to 217, Suetrius Sabinus served as the imperial legate of Pannonia Inferior, but he was replaced on the orders of the new emperor Macrinus after the murder of Caracalla. He seemed to fall out of favour for a time, but eventually he was recalled and appointed as the Proconsular governor of Africa Proconsularis between AD 225 and 230.

X. Loriat believes it is a reasonable conjecture that Suetris Sabinus played a role in the elevation of the young Gordian III in June 238, for he was appointed consul ordinarius a second time in 240, alongside Lucius Ragonius Venustus, an honor not bestowed on a private citizen since Gaius Bruttius Praesens in 153 and 180, and on few afterwards.

During his career, Suetrius Sabinus was both an Augur and a member of the College of Pontiffs, thus belonging to two of the four major priestly colleges. He may have lived in a house on the Aventine Hill in Rome.

== Sources ==
- Lo Cascio, Elio (2005). "The Government and Administration of the Empire in the Central Decades of the Third Century". In Alan Bowman; Averil Cameron; Peter Garnsey (eds.). The Crisis of Empire, AD 193-337. The Cambridge Ancient History. Vol. 12. Cambridgeshire: Cambridge University Press. pp. 156–169. ISBN 9780521301992.
- Loriot, X. (1973). "Les consuls ordinaires de l'année 240 de notre ère". Zeitschrift für Papyrologie und Epigraphik (in French). 12: 253–258. JSTOR 20180568.
- Mennen, Inge (2011). Power and Status in the Roman Empire, AD 193-284. Impact of Empire. Vol. 12. Leiden & Boston: Brill. ISBN 978-90-04-20359-4. JSTOR j.ctt1w76vsp.
- Richardson, L. jr (1992). A New Topographical Dictionary of Ancient Rome. Baltimore & London: The Johns Hopkins University Press. ISBN 0-8018-4300-6 – via Internet Archive.

Political offices
Preceded by Marcus Aurelius Severus Antoninus IV, and Decimus Caelius Calvinus Balbinus II	Consul of the Roman Empire; 214 with Lucius Valerius Messalla Apollinaris	Succeeded by Quintus Maecius Laetus II, and Marcus Munatius Sulla Cerialis
Preceded by Marcus Antonius Gordianus, and Manius Acilius Aviola	Consul of the Roman Empire; 240 with Lucius Ragonius Venustus	Succeeded by Marcus Antonius Gordianus II, and Clodius Pompeianus
