= Servius Sulpicius Similis =

2nd-century Roman eques, praetorian prefect and provincial governor

Servius Sulpicius Similis (died c. 125) was an eques of ancient Rome who held several imperial positions, both civil and military, under Trajan and Hadrian, culminating with praefectus or governor of Egypt from 107 to 112.

His place of origin is unknown. A fragmentary inscription bearing Similis' name has been found in a cathedral in Carthage. This led Ronald Syme to comment, "An African 'patria' is not excluded".

== Career ==
While a centurion, Sulpicius Similis' actions during Trajan's First Dacian War brought him to the emperor's attention. According to an anecdote in Dio Cassius, the emperor also appreciated his humble, honest character. This favor allowed Similis to skip the steps of the equestrian tres militiae, which were normally required to hold the senior imperial equestrian posts. An excerpt of Ulpian indicates that around 106 Similis was named Praefectus annonae, or overseer of the grain supply for the capital city of Rome.

This was followed by his governorship of Roman Egypt, the largest province governed by an eques. It was the most important because Egypt provided a large share of the grain needed to feed Rome. Not only did the governor have command of the troops stationed there—during his tenure two legions were based in Egypt, Legio III Cyrenaica and Legio XXII Deiotariana—he also managed the financial and judicial affairs. Papyrus copies of his rulings have been recovered. One confirms the edict of an earlier prefect, Marcus Mettius Rufus, who ordered that copies of marriage contracts should be registered with all the documents about the husband's properties. Another, dated 1 June 108, directs the strategos of Diopolitis to pay the salary owed to one Chairemon. Two more record his opinion in inheritance cases: in one he affirmed, "As an Egyptian, he had the right to make his will on whatever terms he wished"; in the other he ruled that a will could be made on whatever terms the testator wishes, provided that "he left as heirs those children of his in whose name he made the 'general sales'."

Trajan appointed Similis Praetorian prefect around 112, with Publius Acilius Attianus as his counterpart. Similis was very diligent in administering justice, never remaining at home during daylight. Dio Cassius shares the anecdote that when Trajan learned that Similis would not allow his illness prevent him from hearing cases and told him to go home, Similis replied, "The prefect ought to die on his feet".

It is believed that Sulpicius Similis also participated in Trajan's Parthian campaign during the years 113-114, and for his bravery was awarded dona militaria. He possibly returned to Rome after 114; Syme notes that "nothing is reported" about Similis when Trajan fell ill and died in Syria. It is likely he returned to Rome to aid the urban prefect Quintus Baebius Macer maintain order there. While his counterpart Attianus was soon removed from his position through an adlection into the Senate, Hadrian wanted to keep Similis as Praetorian prefect due to his loyalty and competence. However, as Anthony Birley notes, Similis was growing old, "and weary, perhaps uneasy at the thought of serving Hadrian. He submitted his resignation, which was not at once accepted". But eventually he was allowed to resign his appointment, and Similis retired to a country estate, where he lived out his last days. The epitaph he composed himself was succinct: "Here lies Similis, who existed for so many years and lived seven".

Political offices
Preceded by Gaius Vibius Maximus	Prefect of Egypt; 107–112	Succeeded by Marcus Rutilius Lupus
