= Titus Vestricius Spurinna =

Roman senator, twice consul (born c. 24 AD)

Titus Vestricius Spurinna (c. 24 – after 105 AD) was a Roman senator, consul, and a friend and role model of Pliny the Younger. He was consul at least twice, the first time possibly in 72, and the second in the year 98 as the colleague of the emperor Trajan. Spurinna is one of the correspondents in Pliny's Letters, and had literary interests of his own, including writing lyric poetry. Pliny says dinner parties at his home were often enlivened by scenes from Roman comedy.

Pliny admired Vestricius Spurinna for his active but orderly life as a septuagenarian. He enjoyed conversation, reading and writing, exercise, and bathing. His diet was simple but good, and he enjoyed the full use of his faculties, remaining both physically and mentally vigorous.

== Life ==
"The origins of Vestricius Spurinna is nowhere documented," writes Ronald Syme, stating he was "presumably a Transpadane". Syme also notes that Spurinna's gentilicium and cognomen both are Etruscan, then states the gentilicium, Vestricius, appears only one other time in the entire Italian peninsula, in an inscription at Florentia.

Spurinna first appears in history during the Year of the Four Emperors, when Appius Annius Gallus, one of Otho's generals, put him in command of a detachment of some 3,000 men, to garrison Placentia, while Gallus occupied Verona. Spurinna commanded an unruly force, far too eager to engage their counterparts on the Vitellian side. When he tried to keep this force inside the city, the troops threatened to mutiny; as a wily move, Spurinna agreed to their demands. The next day the soldiers marched forth; when nightfall came, they were surprised to find they must construct a camp. According to standard Roman practice, this would include digging a trench and erecting a wall around the encampment. When the soldiers started having second thoughts, their officers seized the opportunity to praise "Spurinna's foresight in selecting Placentia as a strongpoint." The men acquiesced and marched back to Placentia where they enthusiastically set to work on improving the city's fortifications.

Spurinna's role in the following First Battle of Bedriacum is not recorded; Syme notes Tacitus allows him "to fade out, perhaps mercifully: there is no sign of his whereabouts during the battle or the surrender." It is possible that Tacitus learned of Spurinna's handling of his unruly troops from Spurinna himself; Syme says in a footnote, "Not, however, that Tacitus' account need derive anywhere directly from Spurinna, although the old fellow was still alive c. 105"

He is said to have "held no office under Domitian after it became dishonorable to do so," but under Nerva, Spurinna was governor of Germania Inferior in 97, at the age of 73. He was awarded a triumphal statue for his military service.

== Family ==
The wife of Vestricius Spurinna was Cottia, who was probably considerably younger. They had at least one son, who died around 97 or 98 AD before he had begun a political career, which typically began at the age of thirty. Pliny refers to the son as Cottius, from his mother's nomen, an example of how in the Imperial era sons might preserve their mother's name as well as their father's.

Political offices
Preceded by Lucius Julius Ursus II as suffect consul	Suffect Consul of the Roman Empire; 98 with Trajan II	Succeeded by Gaius Pomponius Pius as suffect consul
