= Aulus Avilius Flaccus =

Roman prefect of Egypt (d. 39 CE)

Aulus Avilius Flaccus (died 39 CE) was a Roman eques who was appointed praefectus or governor of Roman Egypt from 33 CE to 38. His rule coincided with the riots against Alexandria's Jewish population in 38. According to some accounts, including Philo's, Flaccus was responsible for cruelty against the Jews during these events.

Flaccus grew up with the sons of Caesar Augustus's daughters and was friends with Tiberius.

He was recalled to Andros and executed in 39 CE.

== Philo's account in Flaccus ==
According to Philo, the city of Alexandria was divided into 5 quarters, two of which were occupied almost entirely by Jews. In the ensuing riots, Jews were expelled from one of their quarters and forced to move to the remaining last quarter held by them in the city, which caused overcrowding.

Philo writes that Flaccus permitted a mob to erect statues of Caligula—who was demanding to be treated as a god—in Jewish synagogues of Alexandria, an unprecedented provocation. This invasion of the synagogues was perhaps resisted by force, since Philo then writes that Flaccus "was destroying the synagogues, and not leaving even their name." In response, Flaccus then "issued a notice in which he called us all foreigners and aliens... allowing any one who was inclined to proceed to exterminate the Jews as prisoners of war." Philo says that in response, the mobs "drove the Jews entirely out of four quarters, and crammed them all into a very small portion of one ... while the populace, overrunning their desolate houses, turned to plunder, and divided the booty among themselves as if they had obtained it in war." In addition, Philo says their enemies, "slew them and thousands of others with all kinds of agony and tortures, and newly invented cruelties, for wherever they met with or caught sight of a Jew, they stoned him, or beat him with sticks". Philo even says, "the most merciless of all their persecutors in some instances burnt whole families, husbands with their wives, and infant children with their parents, in the middle of the city, sparing neither age nor youth, nor the innocent helplessness of infants." Some men, he says, were dragged to death, while "those who did these things, mimicked the sufferers, like people employed in the representation of theatrical farces". Other Jews were crucified. Flaccus was eventually removed from office, exiled, and ultimately executed.

== See also ==
- List of governors of Roman Egypt

Political offices
Preceded by Hiberus (Viceprefect)	Prefect of Egypt circa 38	Succeeded by Naevius Sutorius Macro
