= Appia gens =

The gens Appia was a plebeian family at Rome. Its nomen, Appius, is a patronymic surname based on the praenomen Appius. The gens does not appear to have been very large, and few of its members achieved great importance.

== Members ==
- Sextus Appius Sex. f. Severus, quaestor to Titus.
- Lucius Appius Maximus Norbanus, an accomplished general under Domitian and Trajan. He put down the revolt of Lucius Antonius Saturninus in Germania Superior, AD 91. He was consul in 103. Although he enjoyed success in the Dacian War, he was defeated and killed in the Parthian War, AD 115.
- Aurelius Appius Sabinus, praefectus of Egypt from AD 249 to 250.

== See also ==
- List of Roman gentes

== Bibliography ==
- Marcus Valerius Martialis (Martial), Epigrammata (Epigrams).
- Gaius Plinius Caecilius Secundus (Pliny the Younger), Epistulae (Letters).
- Lucius Cassius Dio Cocceianus (Cassius Dio), Roman History.
- Sextus Aurelius Victor (attributed), Epitome de Caesaribus.
- Smith, William, ed. (1849). "Lucius Appius Maximus". Dictionary of Greek and Roman Biography and Mythology. Vol. II. Boston: Little, Brown and Company.
- George Davis Chase, "The Origin of Roman Praenomina", in Harvard Studies in Classical Philology, vol. VIII (1897).
- Paul von Rohden, Elimar Klebs, & Hermann Dessau, Prosopographia Imperii Romani (The Prosopography of the Roman Empire, abbreviated PIR), Berlin (1898).
- Guido Bastianini, "Lista dei prefetti d'Egitto dal 30^{a} al 299^{p}" ("List of the Prefects of Egypt from 30 BC to AD 299"), in Zeitschrift für Papyrologie und Epigraphik, vol. 17 (1975).
- Bernard Kavanagh, "The Cursus and Possible Origo of Sex. Appius Severus", in Epigraphica, vol. 77, pp. 259–269 (2015).
