= Gaius Vibius Maximus =

2nd century Roman Governor of Egypt

Gaius Vibius Maximus was an eques active during the reign of the emperors Domitian, Nerva and Trajan. His appointments include prefect of Roman Egypt. Maximus was also a figure in literary circles, and said to have written a history that has not survived.

== Life ==
The earliest step known in Maximus' career is that he was prefect of an ala in Syria, one of the steps of the tres militiae that most equestrians followed. The poet Statius is our source for his next known appointment: in his Silvae Statius begs Maximus to leave Dalmatia, where he apparently held an appointment as procurator, and return to Rome to be with his sick son; Statius hopes this son will show an aptitude for writing history like his father.

His final known posting was as prefect of Egypt, which he held from 103 to 107. When his friend Pliny the Younger heard of Maximus' appointment, he wrote to him on behalf of Arrianus Maturus, a citizen of Altinum, asking Maximus to find a position for Maturus. While governor of Egypt, he issued an edict that a census (apographa) be conducted for that province. He is also attested as being requested to make a decision in a lawsuit over a property dispute in Oxyrhynchus. During his tenure Maximus visited the Colossi of Memnon at dawn of 16 February 104 and heard the statue sing.

If he is the same Maximus Pliny addressed one of his later letters, then Vibius Maximus was engaged in a fierce rivalry with Gaius Pompeius Planta, one of his predecessors as prefect of Egypt. However, experts believe this Maximus is a different man: Sherwin-White argues that this letter was addressed to Novius Maximus. Another possible identification for this Maximus is Maesius Maximus.

After he completed his appointment as prefect of Egypt, Vibius Maximus was condemned on a serious charge, suffered damnatio memoriae, and his name was erased from public inscriptions.

Political offices
Preceded by Gaius Minicius Italus	Prefect of Aegyptus; 103–107	Succeeded by Servius Sulpicius Similis
