= Flavius Earinus =

Greek eunuch and imperial favorite

Titus Flavius Earinus was a eunuch and favorite of the Emperor Domitian. Having had a discreet presence at the emperor's court, he went unnoticed by Suetonius, who made no mention of him. Cassius Dio, however, acknowledged his existence, and his relationship with the emperor was the subject of literary celebration by the poets Martial and Statius, whose verses are the only contemporary sources on his life available today.

== Life ==
In Book 3 of his Silvae, Statius wrote a lengthy poem of 106 verses on the life of Earinus, which constitutes the richest source of biographical details about the young eunuch. According to Statius, Earinus was born in Pergamon, probably in the latter half of the 70s CE, (Note: Statius states that, had Earinus not been a eunuch, his first beard would have just grown; it is conventional in ancient texts to place a boy's first beard between the ages of 16 and 18, and Statius wrote the poem in the early 90s.) and was sent to Rome at an early age. (Note: Statius reports that the poem dedicated to the young eunuch was written at the latter's request. Modern scholars, however, are of the opinion that the order (probably given to Martial as well) must ultimately have come from Domitian himself, with Earinus serving as go-between.)

When and where he underwent his castration is not known for sure; the explanation given in the poem—that the god Aesculapius/Asclepius simply ordered Earinus's body to abandon its sex—is merely metaphorical and stylistic. But for C. Henriksén, it can be deduced, from the clues left in Statius' verses, that the procedure must have taken place in Rome; and, from the poet's insistence that no scars resulted from it, it is given grounds for concluding (if this is not another instance of poetic license) that Earinus' genitals were not excised but crushed, which, according to the ancient medic Paulus of Aegineta, was the procedure to be favored in very young boys. (Note: Eunuchs produced in this way are called thlibias in Greek texts. It is worth noting that in Martial it is never hinted that Earinus was a thlibias.)

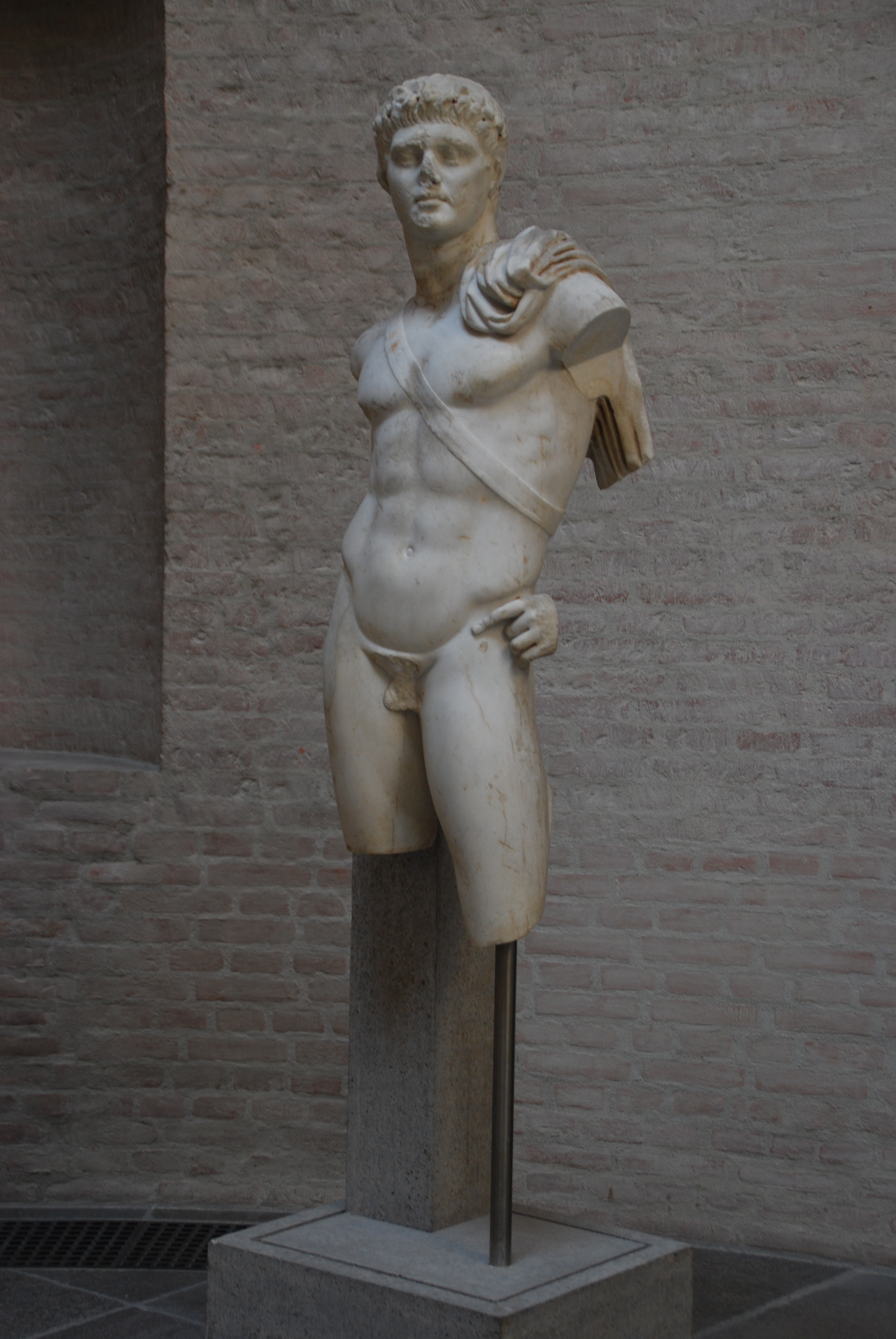
Domitian as a prince (70-80 CE)

In the year 94, Earinus received permission to cut his hair, which he offered to Aesculapius in the temple erected in his native city—an event to which the poems about him devote much room. At the same time as this occasion, or shortly after, his manumission occurred, as acknowledged in the preface that Statius wrote to the poem. As a freedman, Earinus adopted the nomen gentilicium of his patron, thenceforth calling himself Flavius Earinus. The path his life took from this moment on is not known.

== Relationship with Domitian ==
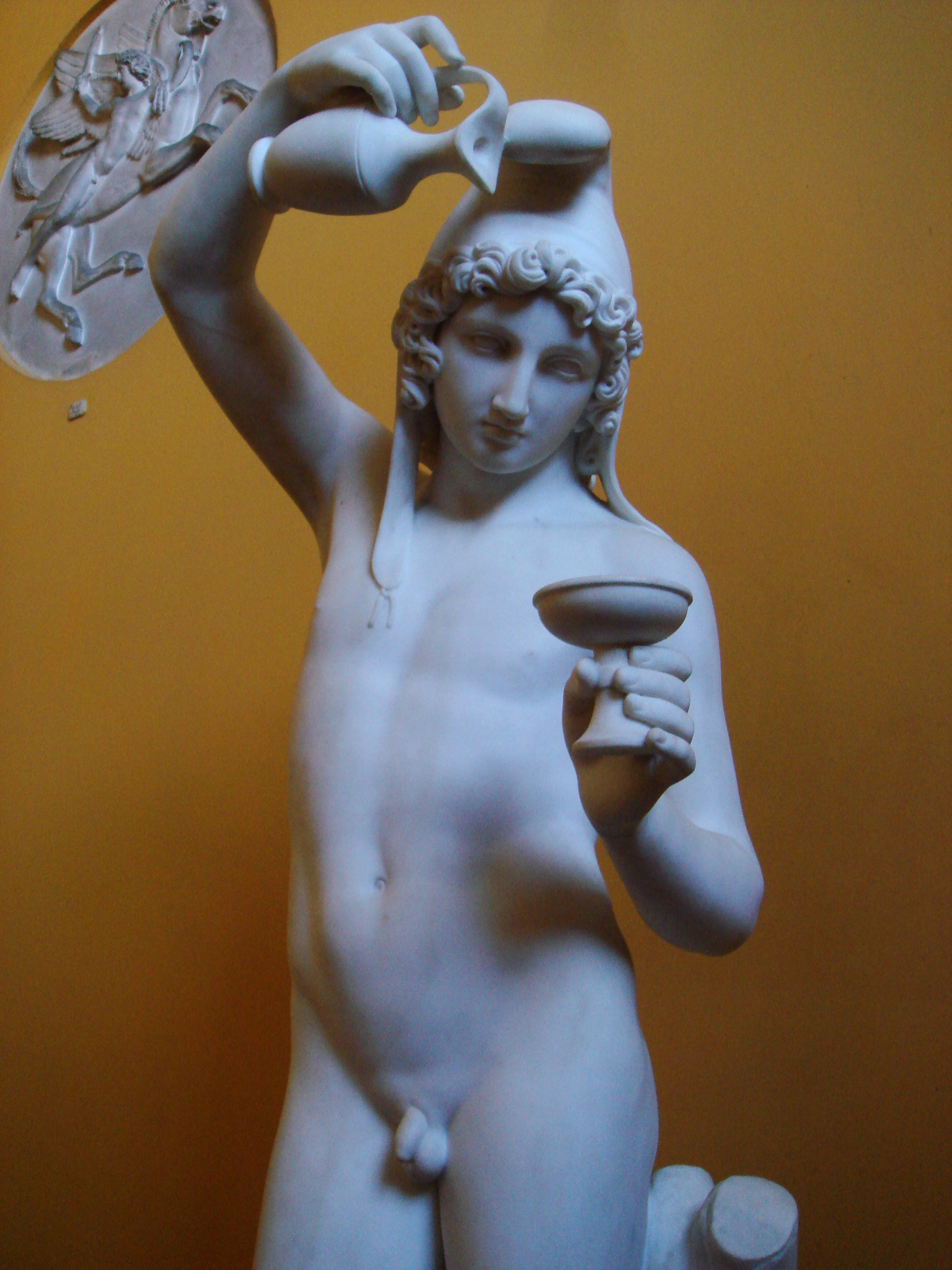
Pouring Ganymede by Bertel Thorvaldsen (19th century)

At Domitian's court, Earinus's role was that of cupbearer to the emperor; such a role in wealthy Roman households was usually entrusted to beautiful young men with long, pretty hair who often also provided sexual favors for their master. In fantastically recounting the circumstances in which Earinus was found and then brought to Rome—discovered by Venus in one of her temples and transported by her in a swan-drawn boat—Statius alludes to Earinus's charms and leaves no doubt as to the amatory purpose of his migration and castration. In fact, the relationship between emperor and slave he describes as a "marriage". Statius and, more directly, Martial also compared their relationship to that of Ganymede and Jupiter, which served as a homoerotic emblem in Greco-Roman culture.

Castration, initially seen as an oriental and foreign practice among Romans, became a recourse which certain Roman men desiring a long relationship with their pueri delicati turned to, in order to prolong the latter's state of youthful beauty and prevent the dreaded growth of beards and leg hair. It was the one form of mutilation that increased a slave's value in the Roman market.

Despite the likely expectation of a long relationship, cutting Earinus's hair may have served as a symbol or marker that the relationship between master and slave had reached its conclusion. (Note: Cutting hair and offering it to the gods was a common ritual in the Greek world that marked a boy or man's passage from one life phase to the next — from boyhood to manhood, from slavery to freedom, etc. This event may have signaled both the end of the relationship of this master-slave pair and the freedom acquired by Earinus.)

Earinus's manumission, which must have happened between the ages of 16 and 18, was a rare occurrence for such a young slave, even more so for an imperial slave, and in contradiction of the Lex Aelia Sentia. Henriksén sees it as an indication of Domitian's sincere affection for the young man.

Cassius Dio briefly mentions the relationship between Domitian and Earinus, highlighting its paradox, as it was emperor Domitian who banned the practice of castration in Rome. Dio attributes the edict to Domitian's spite toward his late brother and predecessor on the throne, Titus, who had also been a lover of eunuchs. The aforementioned poets, however, wave aside the contradiction and insist that Earinus's castration took place before the ban was issued.
