= Gaius Minicius Italus =

Roman eques and governor of Roman Egypt

Gaius Minicius Italus was a Roman eques who flourished during the reign of the emperors Vespasian, Domitian, and Trajan. He was appointed to a series of imperial offices, both military and civil, culminating with praefectus or governor of Roman Egypt.

== Career ==
We can reconstruct his career from an inscription on a bronze statue in Aquileia erected in his honor. The occasion for this statue was "that at his request Trajan had ruled that incolae (inhabitants of the city who were not citizens of it) should be liable to local obligations (munera) along with the citizens." The first office listed was quattuorvir jure dicundo, a municipal body of four men for the administration of justice, which allows us to conclude this was home town.

His equestrian career can be broken down into several parts, the first encompassing the typical tres militiae of an eques. He was praefectus or commander of the following auxiliary units: the Cohors V Gallorum in Dacia, the Cohors I Breucorum in Britannia, and the Cohors II Varcianorum in Germania Inferior. While commanding the II Varcianorum Italus distinguished himself -- most likely campaigning against the Bructeri in the years 77-78 -- and was awarded dona militaria by the emperor Vespasian, receiving one corona aurea and one hasta pura. This was followed by a commission as tribunus angusticlavius with Legio VI Victrix, stationed during the first century in Hispania Tarraconensis. Italus concluded his military career as praefectus of the Ala I Flavia Singularium, a unit comprising 1000 horsemen.

=== Interim governor of Asia ===
Italus then began his next part, advancing up the civil ranks of the equestrian order. His first appointment was as procurator of Hellespontus, a district in the Senatorial province of Bithynia et Pontus. At some later point he was appointed procurator in the adjacent Senatorial province of Asia. While Italus held this appointment, "a mysterious individual came forward claiming to be Nero" (to use Suetonius's words) appeared in Asia. Even twenty years after his death, the name of the last Julio-Claudian emperor could rally supporters, and Domitian expected the governor of the province, the proconsul Gaius Vettulenus Civica Cerealis, to handle the threat. Instead, according to Brian Jones, Civica ignored the pretender, possibly fearing "that intervention might exacerbate the situation, involve war with Parthia and prejudice the successful conclusion of the Dacian campaign." Domitian had Civica murdered and ordered Italus to replace him as governor.

In reward for his loyalty, Italus was afterwards promoted to procurator ducenarus of the Lactorates, a subject people whose territory straddled the provinces of Gallia Lugdunensis and Aquitaine. His mission was probably to manage their production of imperial goods.

=== Further senior offices ===
Despite the death of Domitian, Italus was still favored, and this initiated the third or final part of his career. Under Trajan he was appointed Praefectus annonae, or the person in charge of the public dole of bread to the inhabitants of Rome; he is assumed to have held this post between 95 and 100. His next recorded appointment was as governor of Roman Egypt; his tenure in this office has been dated from 100 to 103. His primary concern as governor was to safeguard the harvest and delivery of grain to the populace of Rome, but surviving letters from his administration show his responsibilities extended further. One, written in Latin and dated 19 February 103, concerns 6 recruits to be added to the ranks of a cohort commanded by one Celsianus. A second, written in Greek and dated to 19 May 103, concerns the ruinous state of the records office for the Arsinoite nome, and orders the strategi of the nome to build a new one at a cost of 3,282 drachmae. The motivation for his letter may have been that the 14-year tax cycle for the province fell in that year.

His life after the year 105, the year the statue was erected by order of the municipal senate, is unknown, as well as whether he married and if so had any children.

Political offices
Preceded by Gaius Pompeius Planta	Prefect of Egypt; 100–103	Succeeded by Gaius Vibius Maximus
