= Gaius Pompeius Planta =

Roman eques

Gaius Pompeius Planta was a Roman eques who was a close associate of the emperor Trajan. He is best known for being praefectus or governor of Roman Egypt, which he held from 98 to 100 AD.

How Planta came to the attention of Trajan is not known. The only other office he is attested as holding is procurator of Lycia et Pamphylia: he is mentioned in an inscription recovered from Balbura that also mentions the contemporary governor, Lucius Luscius Ocrea, allowing us to date his appointment around the years 75–78.

An inscription found at Syene, modern-day Aswan, mentions Planta and a number of other equestrian officers stationed in Egypt, such as praefectus castrorum Lucius Genucius Priscus.

Scholia to Juvenal mentions a history Planta wrote about the Year of Four Emperors, which otherwise is unknown. He is also mentioned a few times in the collected letters of Pliny the Younger, but not in a manner to suggest they were friends. In the series of letters between Pliny and Trajan, there is a group of letters concerning Pliny's efforts to obtain Roman citizenship for his physician Harpocras. At one point Pliny admits while Harpocras has received Roman citizenship, Pliny learns he should have sought Alexandrian citizenship for him first, as Harpocras is a native of Egypt. Trajan replies that it is not fitting for him to grant Alexandrian citizenship, but inform Trajan of which part of Egypt the physician came from, so he can refer the matter to Planta, who was the current prefect of Egypt.

Pliny mentions Planta in a letter to one Maximus, who had delivered several speeches against Planta. Pliny is concerned that now that Planta has died, he should hurry to publication those speeches so to avoid the appearance that he was attacking the man when he could defend himself. This is our only clue to when Planta died: A. N. Sherwin-White dates this letter after 100, when Planta stepped down from his appointment, and before 107.

Political offices
| Preceded by Marcus Junius Rufus | Prefect of Egypt; 98–100 | Succeeded by Gaius Minicius Italus |
