= Statius =

1st-century AD Roman poet

- Πόπλιος Παπίνιος Στάτιος
- Born: Publius Papinius Statius c. AD 45; Naples, Roman Empire
- Died: c. AD 96 (aged c. 51); Naples, Roman Empire
- Citizenship: Roman
- Occupation: Poet
- Spouse: Claudia
- Writing career
- Language: Latin
- Years active: AD 92–96
- Notable works: Thebaid; Silvae; Achilleid (unfinished)
- Movement: Silver Age of Latin literature

Publius Papinius Statius (Greek: Πόπλιος Παπίνιος Στάτιος, Poplios Papinios Statios; /ˈsteɪʃiəs/; Latin: [ˈstaːtiʊs]; (Note: Distinct from the general Latin stem stăt- ('stand'); it is a Samnite name from Oscan staatis.) c. 45 – c. 96) was a Latin poet of the 1st century CE. His surviving poetry includes an epic in twelve books, the Thebaid; a collection of occasional poetry, the Silvae; and an unfinished epic, the Achilleid. He is also known for his appearance as a guide in the Purgatory section of Dante's epic poem, the Divine Comedy.

== Life ==
=== Family background ===
The poet's father (whose name is unknown) was a native of Velia but later moved to Naples and spent time in Rome where he taught with marked success. From boyhood to adulthood, Statius's father proved himself a champion in the poetic contests at Naples in the Augustalia and in the Nemean, Pythian, and Isthmian games, which served as important events to display poetic skill during the early empire. Statius declares in his lament for his father (Silv. 5.3) that his father was in his time equal to any literary task, whether in prose or verse. He mentioned Mevania, and may have spent time there, or been impressed by the confrontation of Vitellius and Vespasian in 69. Statius's father was a Roman eques, but may have lost his status because of money troubles. At Naples, he was a teacher of Greek and Roman literature who attracted many pupils who were destined for religious offices in Rome. He died in 79 AD. From Pliny the Younger's Letters, it has recently been deduced that Statius also wrote under the pseudonym of Propertius.

=== Birth and career ===
Less is known of the biography of Statius. Born c. 45 CE, he grew up in the Greek cultural milieu of the Bay of Naples, and his Greek literary education lends a sophisticated veneer to his ornamental verse. From his boyhood he won several poetic contests at his native Naples and three times at the Alban Festival, where he received the golden crown from the hand of the emperor Domitian, who had instituted the contest. For the Alban Festival, Statius composed a poem on the German and Dacian campaigns of Domitian - which Juvenal lampoons in his seventh satire. Statius is thought to have moved to Rome c. 90 after his father's death in 79; there he published his acclaimed epic poem the Thebaid (c. 92). In the capital, Statius seems to have made many connections among the Roman aristocracy and court, and he was probably supported through their patronage. Statius produced the first three books of occasional poetry, his Silvae, which were published in 93, and which sketch his patrons and acquaintances of this period and mention his attendance at one of Domitian's Saturnalia banquets. He competed in the great Capitoline competition - it is not known in what year, although 94 has been suggested. Statius failed to win the coveted prize, a loss he took very hard. The disappointment may have prompted his return (c. 94) to Naples, the home of his youth. There survives a poem he addressed on this occasion to his wife, Claudia (the widow of a famous singer) who had a musically talented daughter by her first husband, (Silv. 3.5).

=== Later years at Naples ===
Statius's first three books of the Silvae seem to have received some criticism, and in response he composed a fourth book' at Naples, which was published in 95. During this period at Naples, Statius maintained his relations with the court and his patrons, earning himself another invitation to a palace banquet (Silv. 4.2). He seems to have taken an interest in the marriage and career of his stepdaughter and, being childless, he also took under his wing a young slave boy, who died c. 95. In that same year Statius embarked on a new epic, the Achilleid, giving popular recitations of his work (Juv. 7.83) only to complete a book and a half before dying in 95, leaving the poem unfinished. His fifth book of Silvae were published after his death c. 96.

== Works ==
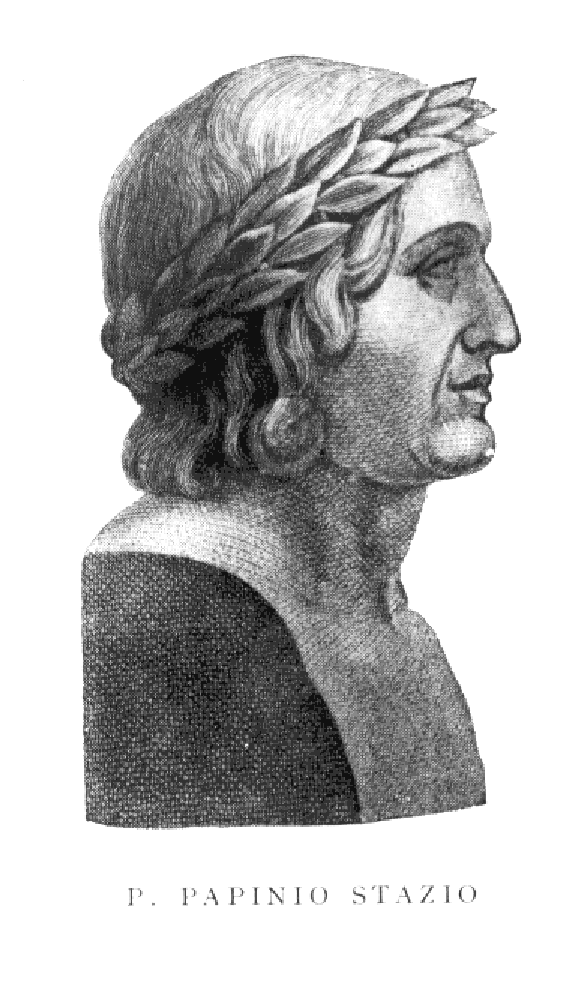
Imaginary portrait by Erasmo di Valvasone, 16th century

As a poet, Statius was versatile in his abilities and contrived to represent his work as otium. Taught by his educated father, Statius was familiar with the breadth of classical literature and displayed his learning in his poetry which is densely allusive and has been described as elaborate and mannerist. He was able to compose in hexameter, hendecasyllable, Alcaic, and Sapphic meters, to produce deeply researched and highly refined epic and polished impromptu pieces, and to treat a variety of themes with the dazzling rhetorical and poetic skill that inspired the support of his patrons and the emperor. Some of Statius's works, such as his poems for his competitions, have been lost; he is recorded as having written an Agave mime, and a four line fragment remains of his poem on Domitian's military campaigns, the De Bello Germanico composed for the Alban Games in the scholia to Juvenal 4.94.

=== The Thebaid ===
Based on Statius's own testimony, the Thebaid was written between c. 80 and 92, beginning when the poet was around 35, and the work is thought to have been published in 91 or 92. The poem is divided into twelve books in imitation of Virgil's Aeneid and is composed in dactylic hexameter. In the Silvae, Statius speaks of his extensive work in polishing and revising the Thebaid and his public recitations of the poem. From the epilogue it seems clear that Statius considered the Thebaid to be his magnum opus and believed that it would secure him fame for the future. In the poem, Statius follows Virgil closely as a model (in the epilogue he acknowledges his debt to Virgil), but he also refers to a wide range of sources in his handling of meter and episodes.

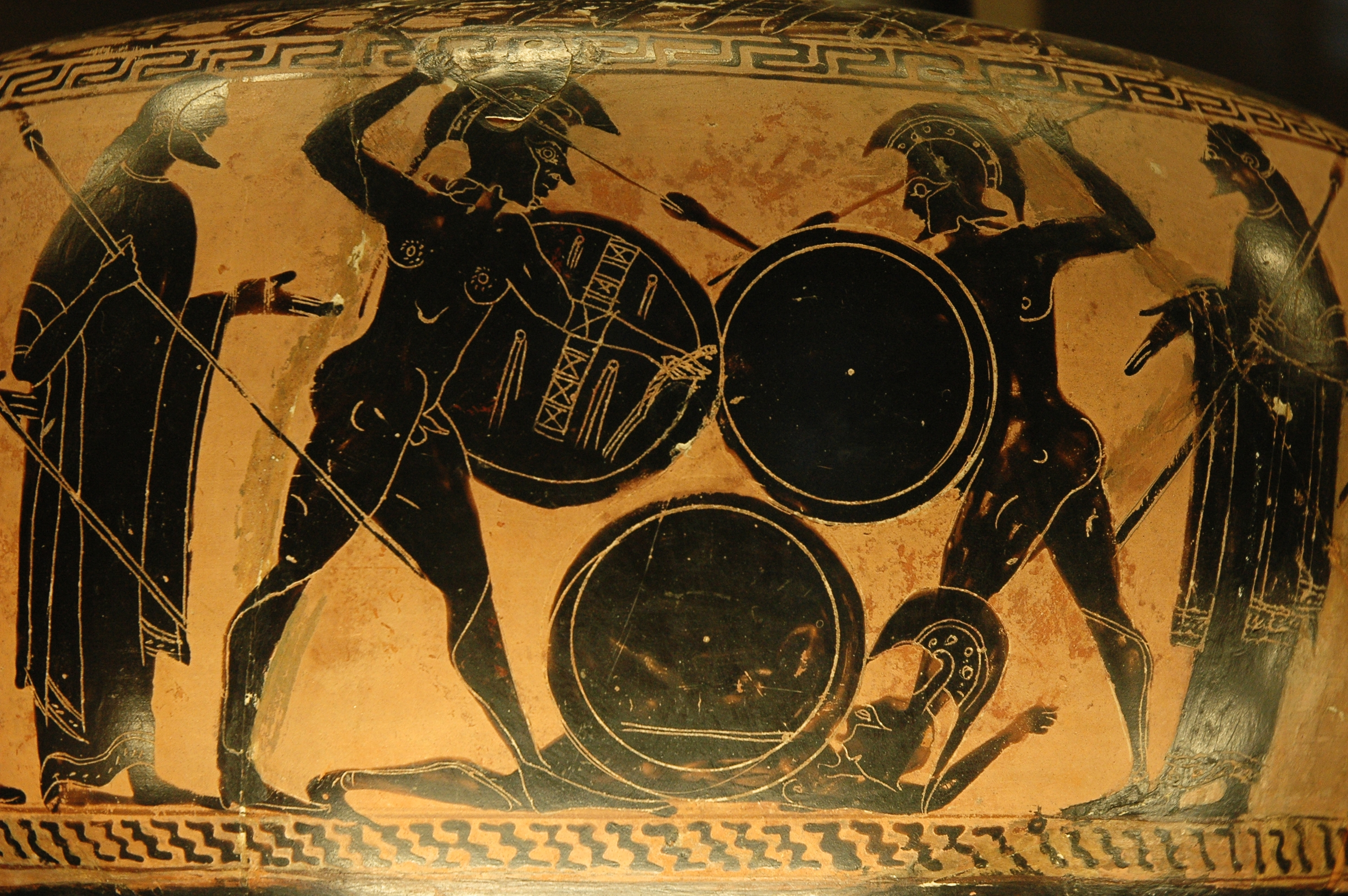
The Thebaid describes the siege of Thebes by the seven Argive champions

The poem's theme is the myth of the Seven against Thebes, the story of the battle between the sons of Oedipus for the throne of Thebes. The poem opens (Book 1) with the disgraced Oedipus' curse on his two sons, Eteocles and Polyneices, who have decided to hold the throne of Thebes in alternate years, one ruling, the other in exile. Jupiter plans a war between Thebes and Argos, although Juno begs him not to incite it. Polyneices in exile fights with Tydeus, another exile at Adrastus' palace; the two are entertained and marry Adrastus' daughters. In Book 2, Tydeus goes to Eteocles to ask him to lay down the throne and yield power, but he refuses and tries to kill Tydeus with an ambush. Tydeus slaughters the Thebans and escapes to Argos, causing Adrastus and Polyneices to declare war on Thebes (Book 3). In the fourth book the Argive forces gather, commanded by the seven champions Adrastus, Polyneices, Amphiaraus, Capaneus, Parthenopaeus, Hippomedon, and Tydeus, and march to Thebes, but at Nemea, Bacchus causes a drought. The army meets Hypsipyle who shows them a spring then tells them the story of the Women of Lemnos (Book 5). While she is speaking, her ward, Opheltes, is killed by a snake; in Book 6, the Argives perform games for the dead child, instituting the Nemean Games. In 7, Jupiter urges the Argives to march on Thebes where battle breaks out during which Amphiaraus is swallowed in the earth. In 8, Tydeus, wounded and dying, kills Melanippus and eats his head; a battle over his body leads to the death of Hippomedon and Parthenopaeus (Book 9). In 10, Juno causes sleep to overcome the Thebans and the Argives slaughter many in the camp; Menoeceus sacrifices himself to save Thebes and Jupiter kills the wicked Capaneus with a thunderbolt. In 11, Polyneices and Eteocles join in single combat and kill each other; Jocasta kills herself and Creon assumes power, forbidding burial of the Argive dead. In the final book, the Argive widows go to Athens to ask Theseus to force Creon to allow their husbands' burial while Antigone, Polyneices's sister, and Argia, Polyneices's wife, burns him illicitly. Theseus musters an army and kills Creon. The Thebaid ends with an epilogue in which the poet prays that his poem will be successful, cautions it not to rival the Aeneid, and hopes that his fame will outlive him.

Modern critics of the Thebaid have been divided over interpretations of the epic's tone. Earlier critics in the 19th and 20th century considered the poem a piece of elaborate flattery that vindicated the regime of Domitian; however, more recent scholars have viewed the poem as a subversive work that criticizes the authoritarianism and violence of the Flavians by focusing on extreme violence and social chaos. Statius' use of allegory in the Thebaid and his abstract treatment of the gods has been seen as an important innovation in the tradition of classical poetry which ushered in Medieval conventions. Finally, although earlier scholars criticized the style of the poem as episodic, current scholars have noted the subtlety and skill with which Statius organizes and controls his narrative and description. Other topics discussed in the scholarship on the Thebaid are the pervasive role of madness (furor), time, or the family.

=== The Silvae ===
The Silvae were probably composed by Statius between 89 and 96. The first three books seem to have been published together after 93, Book 4 was probably released in 95, and Book 5 is thought to have been released posthumously in c. 96. The title of the collection (silvae meaning "forest" or "raw material") was used to describe the draft of a poet's work which was composed impromptu in a moment of strong inspiration and which was then revised into a polished, metrical poem. This suggests that the Silvae are revised, impromptu pieces of occasional poetry which were composed in the space of a few days' time. There are thirty-two poems in the collection (almost all with a dedicatee), divided into five books, each with a dedicatory epistle. Of nearly four thousand lines which the books contain, more than five-sixths are hexameters. Four of the pieces are written in the hendecasyllabic metre, and there is one Alcaic and one Sapphic ode.

Subjects of the Silvae vary widely. Five poems are devoted to the emperor and his favorites, including a description of Domitian's equestrian statue in the Forum (1.1), praise for his construction of the Via Domitiana (4.3), and a poem on the dedication of the hair of Earinus, a eunuch favorite of Domitian's, to a shrine of Aesculapius (3.4). Six are lamentations for deaths or consolations to survivors, including the highly personal poems on the death of Statius's father and his foster-son (5.3,5). The poems on loss are particularly notable in the collection and range from consolations on the death of wives (3.3) to pieces on the death of a favorite parrot (2.4) and a lion in the arena (2.5). Another group of the Silvae give picturesque descriptions of the villas, gardens, and artworks of the poet's friends. In these we have a more vivid representation than elsewhere of the surroundings Roman aristocrats of the empire lived in the country. Important examples include a piece on Pollius's temple to Hercules (3.1), the aetiology of the tree at Atedius' villa (2.3), an antique statue of Lysippus's Heracles (4.6) and a description of Pollius' villa at Surrentum (2.2). The rest of the Silvae consist of congratulatory addresses to friends, and poems for special occasions such as the wedding poem for Stella and Violentilla (2.2), the poem commemorating the poet Lucan's birthday (2.7), and a joking piece to Plotius Grypus on a Saturnalia gift (4.9).

As with the Thebaid, Statius's relationship to Domitian and his court caused him to fall out of favor with critics and readers, but in recent times, the Silvae have been rehabilitated by scholars. Domitian is an important presence in the Silvae, and many of the poems appear to flatter the emperor and court. The content of the Silvae is primarily dictated by the needs of Statius's patrons, and many of the addressees come from the wealthy, privileged class of landowners and politicians. Statius's flattery of these elites has been interpreted in two ways by scholars; some maintain that the collection is highly subversive and is a subtle criticism of Domitian and the Roman aristocracy. Others urge a reading of the Silvae as individual pieces that respond to specific circumstances with their own unique viewpoints.

=== The Achilleid ===
A fragment of his epic poem on the life of Achilles—the Achilleid—is also extant, consisting of one book and a few hundred lines of a second. What was completed of this poem was composed between 94 and 95 based on Silvae 4.7.21ff. Statius records that there were recitations of the poem. It is thought that Statius' death in 95 is the reason that the poem remains unfinished. In the first book, Thetis, having foreknowledge of her son's death in the Trojan War, attempts to hide Achilles on the island of Scyros by dressing him up as a girl. On the island, Achilles falls in love with Deidamia and forces her to have sex with him. Ulysses arrives to recruit Achilles for the war effort and reveals his identity. In the second book, Ulysses and Achilles depart and Achilles gives an account of his early life and tutelage by the centaur Chiron. The poem breaks off at the end of his speech. In general, scholars have remarked on the markedly different tone of the Achilleid in comparison with the Thebaid, equating it more to the style of Ovid than Virgil. Some have also noted the predominance of feminine themes and feminine power in the fragment and focus on the poem's perspectives on gender relations.

== Statius's influence and literary afterlife ==
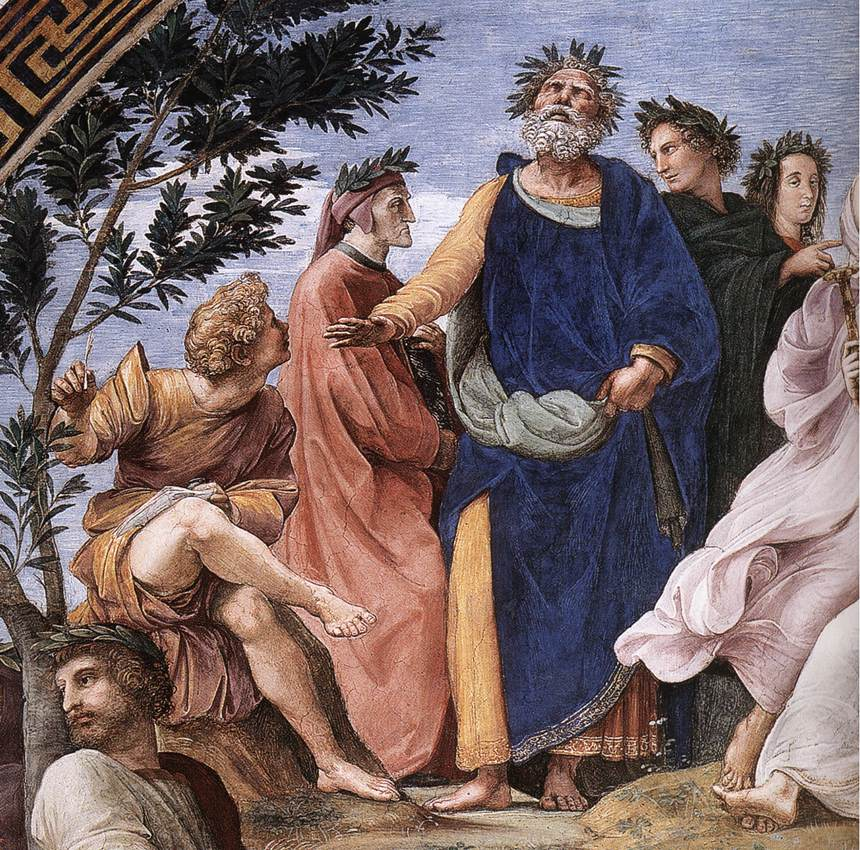
Detail from Raphael's Parnassus (1509–1511): Statius is at far right with olive wreath; the others are (left to right) Petrarch, Ennius, Dante, Homer and Virgil.

Statius's poetry was very popular in his lifetime, although he was not without his critics who apparently had problems with his ex tempore style. Juvenal is thought to extensively lampoon Statius's type of court poetry in his fourth satire on the turbot of Domitian, but he also mentions the immense popularity of Statius's recitations in Satire 7.82ff. In late antiquity, the Thebaid, which was by then a classic, received a commentary by a Lactantius Placidus.

Throughout the Middle Ages, the Thebaid remained a popular text, inspiring a 12th-century French romance as well as works by Boccaccio and Chaucer. Statius's development of allegory helped establish the importance of that technique in medieval poetry. In the Renaissance, the Silvae, thanks to Poliziano, helped inspire an entire genre of collections of miscellaneous, occasional poetry called Sylvae which remained popular throughout the period, inspiring works by Hugo Grotius and John Dryden. Dante mentions Statius in De vulgari eloquentia along with Ovid, Virgil and Lucan as one of the four regulati poetae (ii, vi, 7).

=== Statius in Dante's Divine Comedy ===
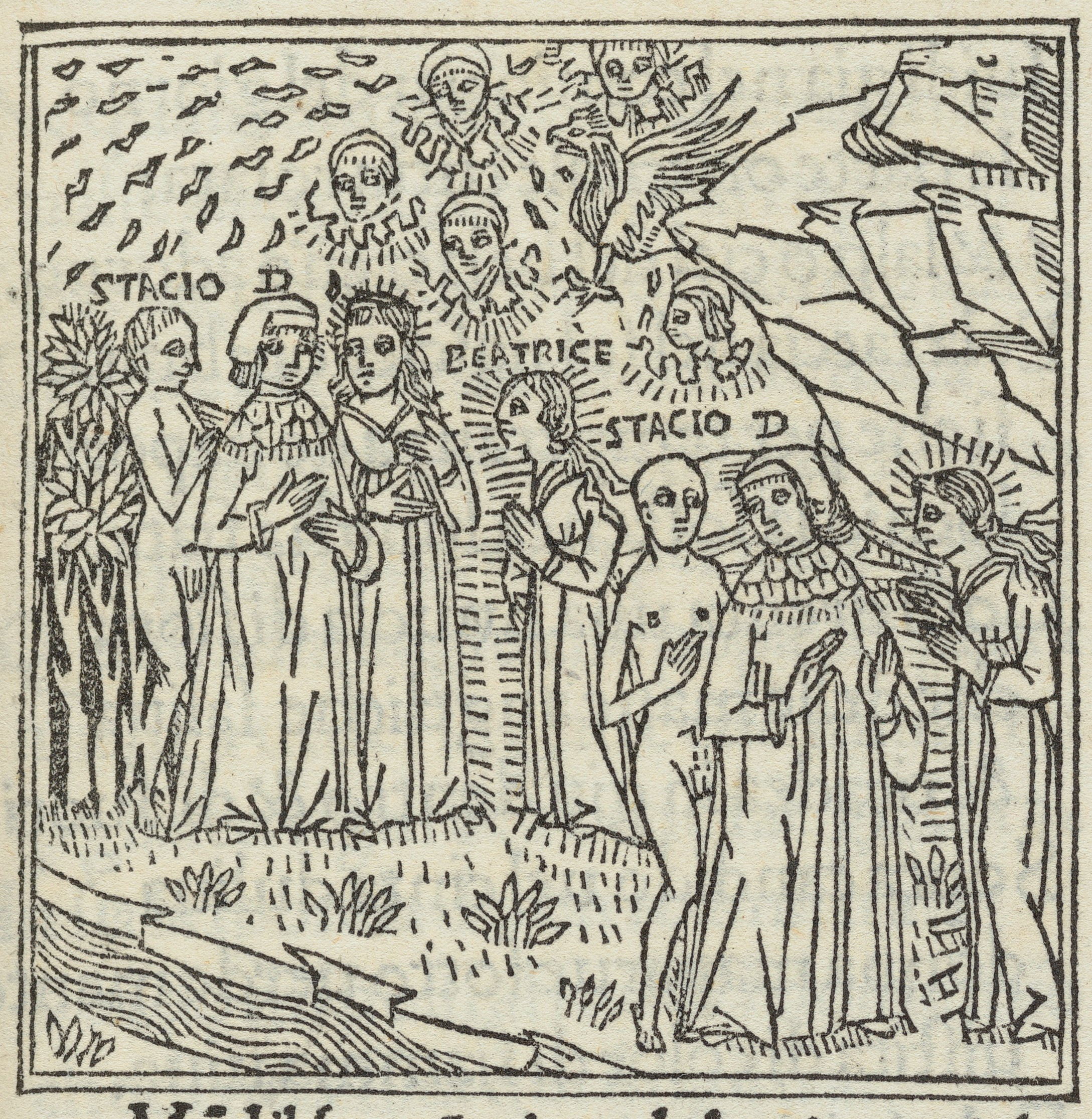
Dante, Virgil, Beatrice and Statius in a 15th-century woodcut

==== Statius as a character in Purgatorio ====
In the Divine Comedy, Dante and Virgil meet Statius as they leave the fifth terrace in Purgatorio (reserved for the avaricious and the prodigal) and enter the sixth terrace (reserved for the gluttonous). Statius's redemption is heard in Purgatorio 20, when the mountain of Purgatory trembles and the penitent souls cry out the hymn "Gloria in excelsis Deo". Statius joins Dante and Virgil, as indicated in Purgatorio 21. Statius ascends Mount Purgatory with Dante and Virgil, and he stays with Dante in the Earthly Paradise at the mountain's summit, after Virgil has returned to Limbo. Statius is last mentioned in Purgatorio 33. Although Statius plays a small role after the disappearance of Virgil, his presence in accompanying Dante through Earthly Paradise until the rivers of Lethe and Eunoe serves an important role in the plot line of the Comedy, as it underscores Statius's significant difference from Virgil. This is because Dante's Statius, a Christian poet who drew inspiration from Virgil, represents a model of the "new vernacular Christian Dante-poeta" in Dante's journey in the Comedy as a protagonist.

Statius's arrival in Purgatorio 20 is often compared to Jesus' appearance to the disciples after the Resurrection as narrated by Luke 24:13–16. Scholars have also paralleled Virgil's and Statius's relationship to that of John the Baptist and Jesus: John the Baptist precedes Jesus and formally baptizes him. In Inferno, Virgil alludes to Christ's Harrowing of Hell, through which John the Baptist is freed from Limbo. In the same spirit, Statius cites Virgil's poems as the reason for his conversion to Christianity. In particular, Statius was saved from the vice of prodigality by reading Virgil's condemnation of this particular vice in a passage of the Aeneid (Aeneid 3.56–57), and that he found reason for converting to Christianity while reading a passage from Virgil's Eclogues (Eclogue 4.5–7). Statius recounts to Virgil that, "through you I was a poet, through you a Christian" (per te poeta fui, per te cristiano, Purg. 22.73). Statius' relationship with Virgil highlights the tragedy of Virgil, who may beget salvation, but cannot attain it.

Though Statius converted to Christianity, he states that he kept his Christianity a secret (Purg. 22.90) as he lived at a time when Christians were persecuted, which resulted him spending four centuries in the fourth terrace of Purgatory, where the vice of sloth is cleansed.

Dante presents Statius as the author of Thebaid and Achilleid and as someone who has a great admiration for Virgil. Statius remarks that Virgil's Aeneid "was my mama and my nurse" (Purg. 21.98) to express Virgil as his inspiration. In Purgatorio, when Dante reveals Virgil's identity to Statius, Statius makes a failed attempt to embrace Virgil, which parallels with Aeneas's failed attempt to embrace the shade of his father Anchises in Aeneid 6.700–2. Dante also adds inventive details about Statius's life to fit with the narrative of the Divine Comedy. In addition to being a foil for Virgil, Dante's creative freedom allows him to establish Statius as a reflection of himself. Both Statius's and Dante's salvation is facilitated by Virgil. Statius's conversations with Virgil parallel Dante's conversations with Virgil. For example, Statius asks Virgil where the poets Terence, Caecilius, Plautus and Lucius Varius are. Both Dante and Statius are curious about the souls in Hell and look to Virgil as a mentor.

Furthermore, Dante's inventive portrayal of Statius embodies three elements of conversion important for the Comedy's tropology of exile. First, his conversion to Christianity symbolizes exodus as humanity was redeemed through Christ. Second, his aversion of vice exemplifies the soul's conversion from sin to grace. Third, his completion of cleansing in Purgatorio allegorizes the soul's exodus from servitude to eternal glory. In addition, the idea that Virgil was the reason for his conversion simulates how Virgil was a rescuer for Dante in the first canto of Inferno. However, though Statius's conversion to Christianity is a key positive element in the Divine Comedy, it is also a "negative exemplum" to Dante. This is because Statius shunned from publicly revealing his Christianity, contrary to Dante, who publicly writes about his faith in the Divine Comedy.

==== Influence of works by Statius on the Divine Comedy ====
In addition to Statius himself, characters drawn from his works are also found in the Divine Comedy. Argia, who was a character in Statius' Thebaid and wife of Polynices, is referred to in the line "of your people" (de le genti tue) in Purg. 22 109–110. Dante considers her to be a noble woman, placing her among the virtuous pagans in Limbo. Capaneus, who is at the center of the Thebaid's tragic theme, is placed in the third ring of the seventh circle of Dis, where those who committed sins of violence against the God are condemned. However, Statius' Capaneus is represented as a heroic character, whereas in the Comedy his only attributes are physical strength and a failure to accept God's divine power.

== Sources ==
- Newlands, Carol. (2012). Statius, Poet between Rome and Naples. Classical literature and society. London: Bristol Classical Press.
- Vessey, David. (1973). Statius and the Thebaid. Cambridge, UK: Cambridge Univ. Press.

=== Editions ===
- John Henry Mozley (ed., trans.), Statius, with an English translation, in 2 volumes. Vol. I, Vol. II (Loeb Classical Library, 1928).
- David R. Slavitt (tr.), Broken Columns: Two Roman Epic Fragments: The Achilleid of Publius Papinius Statius and The Rape of Proserpine of Claudius Claudianus, with an Afterword by David Konstan (Philadelphia: University of Pennsylvania Press, 1997).
- Betty Rose Nagle, The Silvae of Statius. Translated with Notes and Introduction (Bloomington, IN: Indiana University Press, 2004).
- Karla F.L. Pollmann, Statius, Thebaid 12: Introduction, Text, and Commentary, Studien zur Geschichte und Kultur des Altertums. Neue Folge. 1. Reihe, Band 25 (Paderborn: Ferdinand Schoeningh, 2004).
- Gibson, Bruce, Statius. Silvae 5. Edited with Introduction, Translation and Commentary, Oxford Classical Monographs (Oxford, Oxford University Press, 2006).
- Jane Wilson Joyce (ed.), Statius. Thebaid: A Song of Thebes (Ithaca: Cornell University Press, 2008) (Masters of Latin Literature).
- Pavan, Alberto (ed., trans., comm.), La gara delle quadrighe e il gioco della guerra: Saggio di commento a P. Papinii Statii Thebaidos liber VI 238–549, Minima philologica 6 (Alessandria, Edizioni dell'Orso, 2009).
- McNelis, Charles (ed., trans.), Statius: Achilleid. Edited with introduction, translation, and commentary (Oxford, 2024)

=== Studies ===
- Andreacchio, M. "Dante's Statius and Christianity: A Reading of Purgatorio XXI and XXII in their Poetic Context." Interpretation: A Journal of Political Philosophy (Vol. 39:1, 2012); pp. 55–82.
- Bernstein, N. W. (2003). "Bernstein, Ancestors, Status, and Self-Presentation in Statius' Thebaid", Transactions and Proceedings of the American Philological Association 133: 353–79.
- Cannizzaro, Francesco (2023). Sulle orme dell'Iliade: riflessi dell'eroismo omerico nell'epica d'età flavia. Firenze: Società editrice fiorentina. ISBN 9788860326898.
- Fantham, E. "Chironis Exemplum: on teachers and surrogate fathers in Achilleid and Silvae", Hermathena 167 (1999), 59–70.
- Feeney, D. "Tenui... latens discrimine: spotting the differences in Statius' Achilleid, Materiali e discussioni per l'analisi dei testi classici 52 (2004), 85–106.
- Ganiban, Randall T. (2007). Statius and Virgil: The Thebaid and the Reinterpretation of the Aeneid. Cambridge, UK: Cambridge Univ. Press.
- Hardie, A. Statius and the Silvae (Liverpool, 1983).
- Hershkowitz, Debra (1994). "Sexuality and Madness in Statius' Thebaid", Materiali e discussioni per l'analisi dei testi classici 33: 123–147.
- Hershkowitz, Debra (1995). "Patterns of Madness in Statius' Thebaid", Journal of Roman Studies 85: 52–64.
- Heslin, P. J. The Transvestite Achilles: Gender and Genre in Statius' Achilleid (Cambridge, 2005).
- Johannsen, N. Dichter ueber ihre Gedichte: Die Prosavorreden in den 'Epigrammaton libri' Martials und in den 'Silvae' des Statius, Hypomnemata, 166 (Goettingen: Vandenhoeck & Ruprecht, 2006).
- Lewis, C. S. "Dante's Statius." Studies in Medieval and Renaissance Literature (Cambridge, 1966).
- Lovatt, H. Statius and Epic Games: Sport, Politics, and Poetics in the Thebaid, Cambridge Classical Studies (Cambridge: Cambridge University Press, 2005).
- McNelis, Charles. (2002). "Greek Grammarians and Roman Society During the Early Empire: Statius' Father and his Contemporaries." Classical Antiquity 21: 67–94.
- McNelis, Charles. (2007). Statius' Thebaid and the Poetics of Civil War. Cambridge, UK: Cambridge Univ. Press.
- Mendelsohn, D. "Empty Nest, Abandoned Cave: maternal anxiety in Achilleid 1", ClAnt 9.2 (1990), 295–308.
- Newlands, Carol. (2012). Statius, Poet between Rome and Naples. Classical literature and society. London: Bristol Classical Press.
- Newlands, C. Statius' Silvae and the Poetics of Empire (Cambridge, 2002).
- Shackleton Bailey, D. R. Statius Silvae (Cambridge, Mass.; London, 2003).
- Simms, Robert C. (2020). Anticipation and Anachrony in Statius' Thebaid (London, 2020).
- Venini, Paola. (1964). "Furor e psicologia nella Tebaide di Stazio", Athenaeum 42: 201–13.
- Vessey, David. (1973). Statius and the Thebaid. Cambridge, UK: Cambridge Univ. Press.
