= Silvae =

Poetry collection by Statius

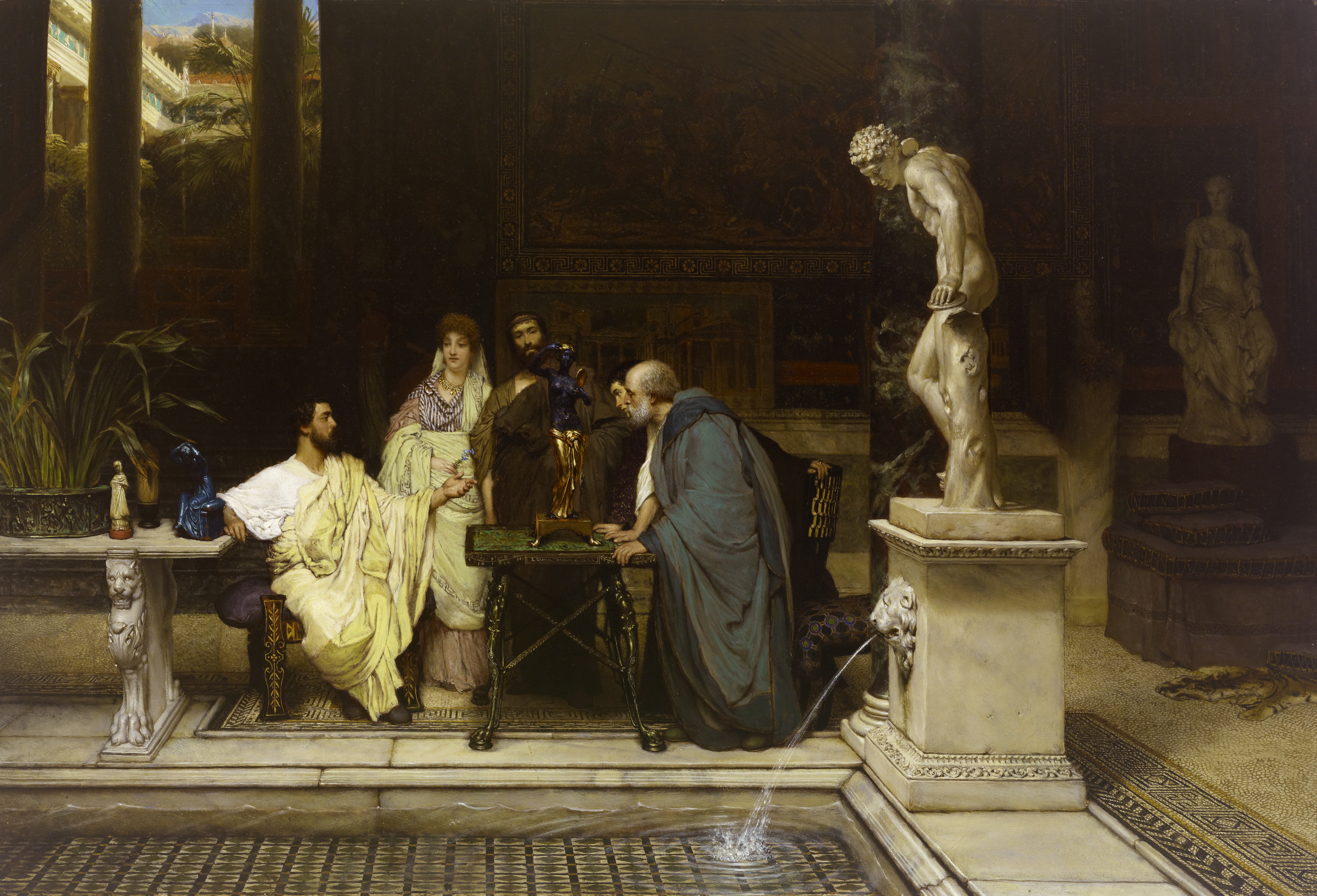
A Roman Art Lover (1868) by Lawrence Alma-Tadema showing the types of Roman art patrons who could have commissioned Statius' poetry

The Silvae ([ˈsɪɫ.wae̯]; lit. 'forests' or 'materials') is a collection of Latin occasional poetry in hexameters, hendecasyllables, and lyric meters by Publius Papinius Statius (c. 45 – c. 96 CE). There are 32 poems in the collection, divided into five books. Each book contains a prose preface which introduces and dedicates the book. The subjects of the poetry are varied and provide scholars with a wealth of information on Domitian's Rome and Statius' life.

The Silvae were rediscovered by Poggio Bracciolini in the Library of Reichenau Abbey around 1417, along with the Punica of Silius Italicus.

== Composition ==
The Silvae were probably composed by Statius between 89-96 CE. The first three books seem to have been published together after 93 CE (a year after the publication of the Thebaid), and Book 4 was probably released in 95 CE. Book 5 is thought to have been released posthumously c. 96. Each book is datable by a comparison of the careers of the individual poems' addressees and references in other authors such as Martial. The title of the collection has caused some debate on the part of scholars, though it is assumed that it was taken from the lost Silvae of Lucan. In Latin, silva which in the nominative plural is silvae, can mean both 'forest' and 'material.' Silva was used to describe the draft of a poet's work which was composed impromptu in a moment of strong inspiration and which was then revised into a polished, metrical poem. This suggests that the Silvae are revised, impromptu pieces of occasional poetry which were composed in the space of a few days' time; Statius describes his method of composition in the preface to Book 1, saying mihi subito calore et quadam festinandi voluptate fluxerant cum singuli de sinu meo prodiderint ('[they] streamed from my pen in the heat of the moment, a sort of pleasurable haste, emerging from my bosom one by one'). He goes on to say in the preface that none of them took more than two days to compose. Almost all the poems are dedicated individually to a patron and are accompanied by titles which are considered a later addition by editors.

== Poetic models ==
As remarked above, the similarity in title suggests that Statius may have modeled his Silvae on a collection of Lucan's poetry, however the loss of that work makes comparisons difficult. There was a strong tradition of Latin panegyric poetry and prose which is mostly lost today, but can still be seen in works such as the Laus Pisonis and the Elegiae in Maecenatem. Catullus and his collection of polymetric poetry seems to be an important inspiration for Statius. Several of his poems employ Catullus' favorite meter, hendecasyllables and cover a diverse range of themes similar to the variety in Catullus' work, although Statius avoids the invective tone of Catullus except in jest at 4.9. Horace is also an important model, whose influence is particularly felt in Statius' lyric compositions (4.5,7) and in his epistle (4.4). The narrative style of Ovid can be detected in the story of Pan in 2.3. Virgilian references abound; many of Statius' exempla in the poems derive from characters in the Aeneid and most poems reference Virgil in some way. Finally, Lucan's poetry serves as an inspiration for 2.7. On the Greek side, we learn from the lament for his father 5.3 that Statius was familiar with the canonical nine lyric poets, Callimachus, and the Alexandrian Pleiad. Pindar is perhaps one of the most important influences for Statius; the panegyric nature of his poetry, his mythological examples, and his invocations all reference Pindaric convention (see also 4.7).

== Contents ==
=== Book 1 ===
The preface to the first book dedicates the work to L. Arruntius Stella, a fellow poet. The poet anxiously describes his impromptu style of composition, hopes his poetry is polished enough and gives a brief outline of the poems to come along with context about their composition.

1.1 Ecus Maximus Domitiani Imp. ("The Great Equestrian Statue of Domitian") Praise for and elaborate description of the colossal equestrian statue of Domitian erected in the forum in 91 CE. Discussion of the situation in the forum, comparison with mythological exempla, the imagined reactions of Roman historical personages to the statue.

1.2 Epithalamion in Stellam et Violentillam ("Wedding Song for Stella and Violentilla") One of the longer Silvae. The poem begins with a monumentalizing of the day and describes a conversation between Venus and Cupid, in which the gods praise Stella and Violentilla and describe their love for each other. Venus travels to Rome and admires Domitian's palace before giving advice to Roman maidens and Violentilla to seek marriage. The poet describes the wedding at which gods and humans mix and finishes by encouraging the poet to sing elegy.

1.3 Villa Tiburtina Manili Vopisci ("The Tiburtine Villa of Manilius Vopiscus") A description of the villa, praise of the landscape at Tivoli, description of Vopiscus' art collection, and praise of otium.

1.4 Soteria Rutili Gallici ("To Rutilius Gallicus on his Recovery") Statius describes the concern of the Senate for Gallicus when he was ill, and Apollo praises Gallicus' military career and seeks a cure. The poem ends with a sacrifice of thanksgiving for his recovery.

1.5 Balneum Claudi Etrusci ("The Baths of Claudius Etruscus") The poet invokes the muses and water nymphs as patrons of the building and describes the baths.

1.6 Kalendae Decembres ("The Kalends of December") In hendecasyllables, this poem describes Statius' attendance at a Saturnalia banquet given by Domitian; he describes the meal, the guests, the female entertainment, and the emperor's largesse.

=== Book 2 ===
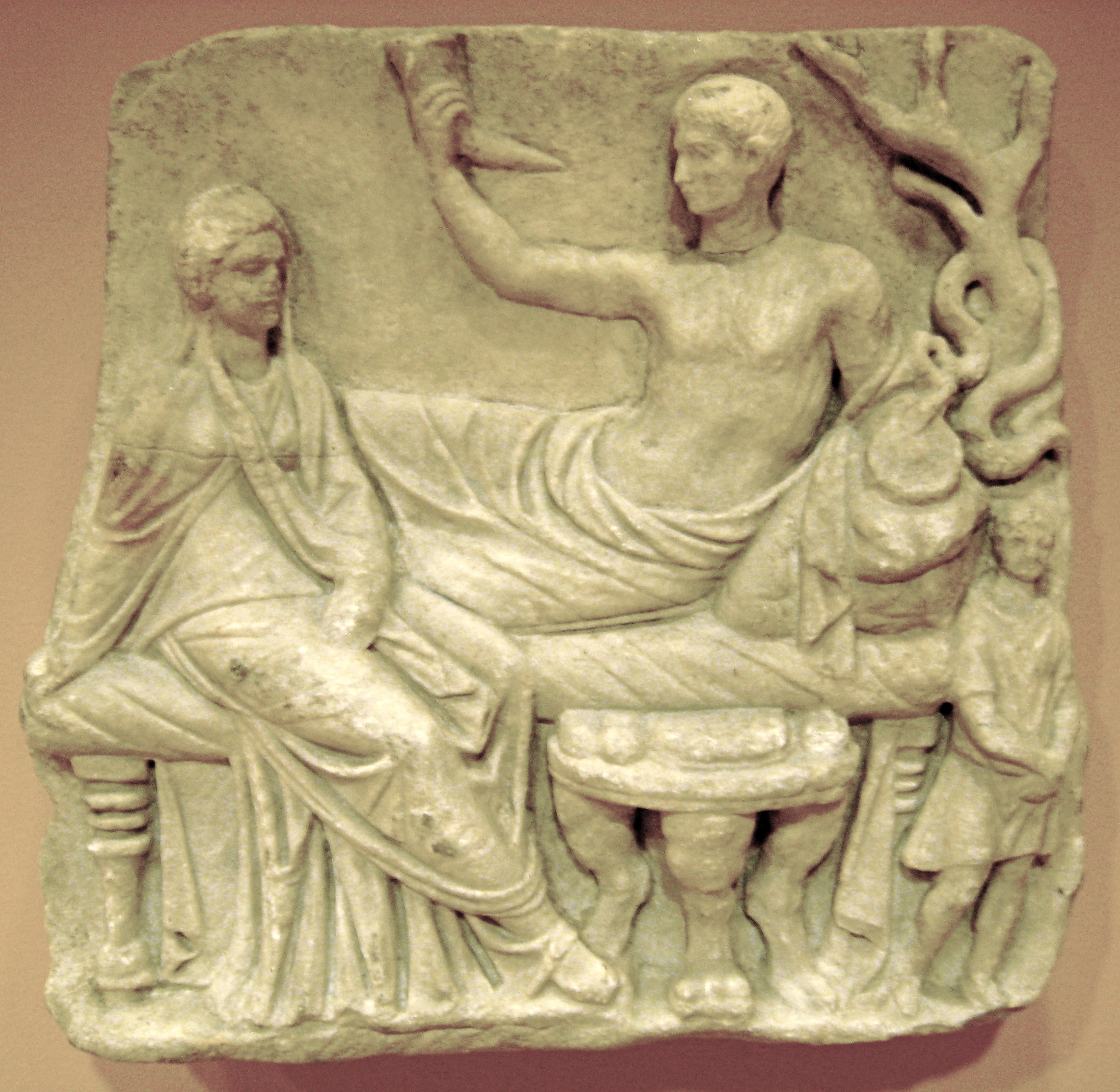
A Roman relief depicting a funeral feast

The preface dedicates the book to Atedius Melior and summarizes the poems in it which focus on loss, object descriptions, and end with a genethliakon.

2.1 Glaucias Atedi Melioris Delicatus ("Glaucias, Melior's Boy Favorite") This is a long poem of consolation for the loss of Melior's lover, Glaucias. The weeping poet describes the funeral and explains the difficulty of the theme; Glaucias' birth, rearing, and death at the hands of the Parcae are recounted. Melior's dead friend, Blaesus, leads the boy to Elysium.

2.2 Villa Surrentina Polli Feclicis ("The Surrentine Villa of Pollius Felix") A description of a villa at Surrentum, composed after a festival. Description of the landscape, terraces, and earthworks, Pollius' art collection, and praise of the villa as a retreat from city life, Pollius' political career, and his wife.

2.3 Arbor Atedi Melioris ("The Tree of Atedius Melior") An aetiology for a tree on Melior's estate written as a birthday present; the poet recounts Pan's pursuit of a nymph and dedication of the tree as a memorial of his desire.

2.4 Psittacus Eiusdem ("The Parrot of the Same (Melior)") Praise of the parrot and a description of its death and funeral.

2.5 Leo Mansuetus ("The Tame Lion") Address to a tame lion who has been killed in the arena.

2.6 Consolatio ad Flavium Ursum de Amissione Pueri Delicati ("A Consolation to Flavius Ursus on the Death of his Favorite Slave") Praise of the boy's independent spirit and appearance, and description of the lavish funeral with the assurance of his place in Elysium.

2.7 Genethliacon Lucani ad Pollam ("To Polla, an Ode in Honor of Lucan's Birthday") In hendecasyllables, the poet invokes the gods in his song and describes Calliope's inspiration of Lucan's poetry and prophecy of his works. Lucan's death is recounted, Nero is criticized, and Lucan is imagined in the afterlife.

=== Book 3 ===
The third book is dedicated to Pollius Felix of 2.2. Statius stresses the confidence he now has in his Silvae and Pollius' help in their composition. The poems deal with consolation, description, and end with an exhortation to Statius' wife to move with him to Naples.

3.1 Hercules Surrentinus Polli Felicis ("The Hercules of Pollius Felix at Surrentum") This long poem describes a shrine constructed by Pollius for Hercules. The poet describes a picnic he attended with Pollius and the downpour that forced them to shelter in a dilapidated shrine to Hercules. Hercules appears to Pollius and commissions him to build him a temple which is dutifully planned and built. The final section includes a prayer in the context of a festival at the shrine.

3.2 Propempticon Maecio Celeri ("Send off to Maecius Celer") This propempticon is designed to send off Celer to administer one of the provinces. It begins with a prayer to the sea gods to protect the ship, then describes the voyage of the ship to the province. The poet ends with a wish for Celer's return.

3.3 Consolatio ad Claudium Etruscum ("Consolation for Claudius Etruscus") The poem is a consolation on the death of Etruscus' father. The poet invokes Pietas and describes Etruscus' grief, the father's career, his service to earlier emperors as accountant, his wife Etrusca, and his prosperity. He ends with a promise of ritual offerings to the shade of the father and encourages Etruscus.

3.4 Capilli Flavi Earini ("The Hair of Flavius Earinus") This piece describes the dedication of the hair and a mirror of Domitian's eunuch favorite Earinus to the shrine of Aesculapius at Pergamum. As a boy, Venus prophesied Earinus' service to Domitian and carried him to Rome after his operation to make him a eunuch. The poem ends with the dedication of the objects and a prayer for Domitian.

3.5 Ad Uxorem Claudiam ("To his Wife, Claudia") In this poem, Statius exhorts his wife to move with him back to his home at Naples. The poet praises her faithfulness to him so far and discusses marriage prospects for their daughter in southern Italy. The poem ends with the praise of Naples and the poet's reassurance that his wife will accompany him.

=== Book 4 ===
This book is dedicated in the preface to Marcus Vitorius Marcellus. The addressees and the meters of the poems in Book 4 vary far more than in the other books. Statius includes a response to critics of his earlier books, saying that the fourth book includes more poems than the others so that they do not think their criticism has weakened Statius' resolve to publish.

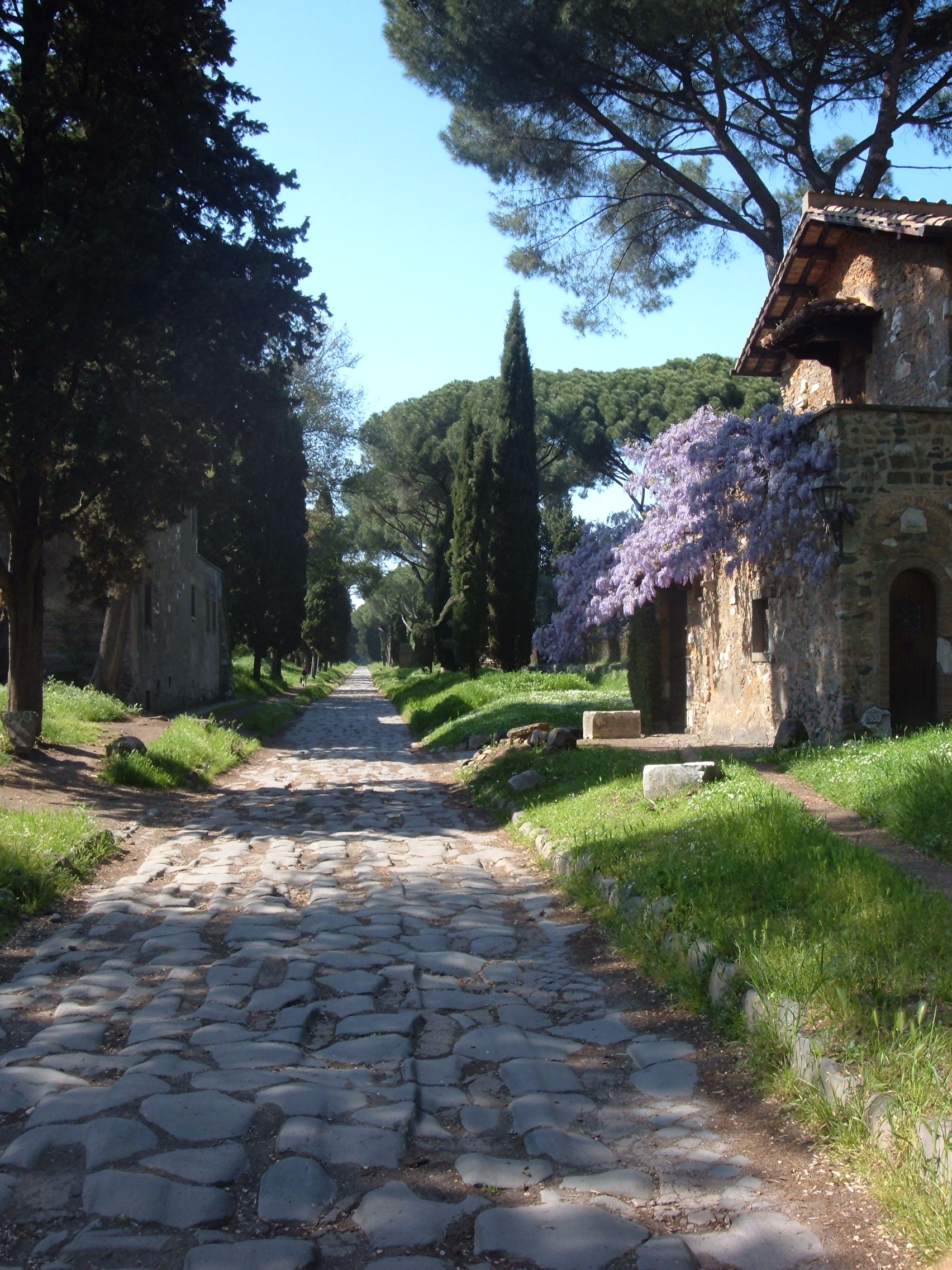
A photograph of the Via Appia, a road similar to the Via Domitiana Statius' praises in 4.3.

4.1 Septimus Decimus Consolatus Imp. Aug. Germanici ("The 17th Consulship of Augustus Germanicus") The opening poem commemorates Domitian's 17th consulship in 95 CE; Domitian is hailed as the restorer of the golden age, as bringer of joy to the senate, and triumphator. It ends with a prayer for long life.

4.2 Eucharisticon ad Imp. Aug. Germ. Domitianum ("Thanksgiving to the Emperor Domitian") This poem thanks Domitian for an invitation to a banquet at his palace. Statius compares himself to Homer and Virgil, describes the palace, and prays for long life for the emperor.

4.3 Via Domitiana ("The Highway of Domitian") In hendecasyllables, Statius praises Domitian's way, constructed in 95 CE. Domitian's laws and character are praised. The poet describes the miseries of travel in the past and then the method of road construction. The River Vulturnus says that he only suffers to be bridged because it is at Domitian's command and the poet describes the bridge and arch. The Cumaean Sibyl inspecting the road prophesies Domitian's deification. The poet ends with a prayer for long life for Domitian.

4.4 Epistula ad Vitorium Marcellum ("Letter to Vitorius Marcellus") The poet commands his letter to go to Marcellus to ask him how he is doing and where he is vacationing from city business. Marcellus' military skills, administration, and achievements are praised, and the poet closes by announcing his new project, the Achilleid.

4.5 Ode Lyrica ad Septimium Severum ("Lyric Ode to Septimius Severus") This poem in the Alcaic meter is one of Statius' two lyric compositions. The poet praises spring and his rustic Italian life while he praises a friend named Septimius Severus (not the later Roman emperor of the same name), his city of Lepcis Magna and his eloquence.

4.6 Hercules Epitrapezios Novi Vindicis ("The Hercules Statuette of Novius Vindex") The scene is a dinner given by Vindex, an avid art connoisseur, at which he shows the poet his antique statue of Hercules by Lysippus. The history of the statue is given, owned by Alexander, Hannibal, and Sulla, and the poem closes with the praise of Vindex' peaceful lifestyle.

4.7 Ode Lyrica ad Vibium Maximum ("Lyric Ode to Vibius Maximus") The second lyric composition in Sapphics begins with a comparison of the poet to Pindar. He requests Gaius Vibius Maximus to return from Dalmatia because his son is ill and expresses the hope that the son will live to learn from his father to write histories like Livy and Sallust.

4.8 Gratulatio ad Iulium Menecraten ("Poem of Congratulation to Julius Menecrates") This poem congratulates Menecrates on the birth of his third son, earning him the ius trium liberorum, but the poet criticizes Menecrates for not writing to him sooner of the news and ends with a prayer for good fortune.

4.9 Hendecasyllabi Iocosi ad Plotium Grypum ("Jesting Hendecasyllables to Plotius Grypus") Taking on a joking Catullan attitude, the poet expresses disdain for the poor quality of the book of speeches sent by Grypus to him for the Saturnalia and asks him if he could not find a more suitable gift.

=== Book 5 ===
This final book of Statius' Silvae is dedicated to Flavius Abascantus who is praised for his love of his wife Priscilla.

5.1 Epicedion in Priscillam Abascanti Uxorem ("Consolation on the Death of Priscilla") This long poem consoles Abascantius on the death of his wife. The poem begins by praising Abascantius for his devotion to her and stressing the inevitability of death and goes on to praise Priscilla for her birth, devotion to her husband, and her reaction to her husband's promotion. Statius goes on to criticize Fortuna and Invidia for leading to her death. Her final words are related in which she asks her husband to stay loyal to Domitian and not grieve for her. The poem ends with a description of the tomb, funeral feast, and Priscilla's entrance into Elysium.

5.2 Laudes Crispini Vetti Bolani Fili ("Praises of Crispinus, Son of Vettius Bolanus") This poem praises the virtues of Crispinus and his summons to foreign service, beginning with praise for his senatorial career and upbringing. The poet asks him to forgive his mother who was accused of trying to poison him and praises his devotion to his friend in political trouble. Statius wonders what province Domitian will pick for Crispinus and thanks him for attending his Achilleid recitations. At the end of the poem, Crispinus is finally summoned to service.

5.3 Epicedion in Patrem Suum ("Lament for his father") This long personal poem is a lament by Statius of his father written three months after his death. Statius' father is imagined as looking at the world from heaven and rejoicing in Elysium while Statius' grief intensifies. The poet decides not to sacrifice birds but hopes that Pietas will tend his father's memory and compares his father to Homer. Statius gives an account of his father's poetic learning and describes his religious poetry. He thanks his father for teaching him, helping his career along, finding him a wife, and inspiring him to write. Statius prays that the chthonic gods will receive his father kindly and that his shade will continue to inspire him.

5.4 Somnus ("Sleep") This brief prayer hymns Sleep and asks for relief from insomnia.

5.5 Epicedion in Puerum Suum ("Lament for his Boy") This final poem is a lament for Statius' slave boy whom he nurtured. The poet says that he cannot keep writing his Achilleid and he angrily blames the gods for the death.

== Rediscovery ==
Modern texts of the Silvae all descend from the M manuscript, now in the Biblioteca Nacional de España in Madrid. This is a copy commissioned by Poggio Bracciolini in 1418, while he was in Germany for the Council of Constance. The manuscript contains the Silvae together with the poetry of Silius Italicus and Marcus Manilius. It was likely copied from an ancestor manuscript, now lost, discovered by Bracciolini at Reichenau Abbey. An inventory from a library in the Constance area, made in the second quarter of the 9th or 10th centuries, lists one work as "Ovidii Metamorfoseon Sili et Stacii volumen I". This may have been the ancestor manuscript which Bracciolini had access to. After his return to Italy in 1453, multiple copies of the M manuscript were made, and the editio princeps of the Silvae was based on one of these copies (a bad one). The M manuscript was subsequently lost, not to be rediscovered until 1879, in Madrid.

Another manuscript in the Laurentian Library in Florence contains a single excerpt from the Silvae, the ode to Lucan (II.7). This is part of a florilegium (a collection of miscellaneous writings) made in Western Germany in the 10th century. It is possible that this excerpt came from the same ancestor as Bracciolini's M.

== Influence ==
Panegyrical and occasional poetry after Statius was strongly influenced by his work. Statian influence can be particularly seen in the works of Claudian and Nemesianus. In the Renaissance, the Silvae received modern commentaries, first by Domizio Calderini (1469) and more importantly by Angelo Poliziano (1480) who is credited with popularizing the collection to western literature and writing an extensive commentary. Poliziano first connected silvae with Quintilian's remarks and appreciated Statius' learned style; many of his poems even used the Silvae as models, and he published his own collection of Sylvae. Poliziano's poetry inspired others and founded the convention of naming any collection of occasional poetry Sylvae. To this genre, Julius Caesar Scaliger added the ancient convention of formalizing subgenres, such as epithalamia and propemptica. In the Netherlands in 1600, the Silvae became a major influence at the University of Leiden. The literary scholar Hugo Grotius in the early 17th century composed laudatory sylvae which engage strongly with Statius' poetry and produced his own edition with commentary. In 1685, John Dryden composed a collection of poetical miscellanies called the Sylvae.

== Critical responses to the Silvae ==
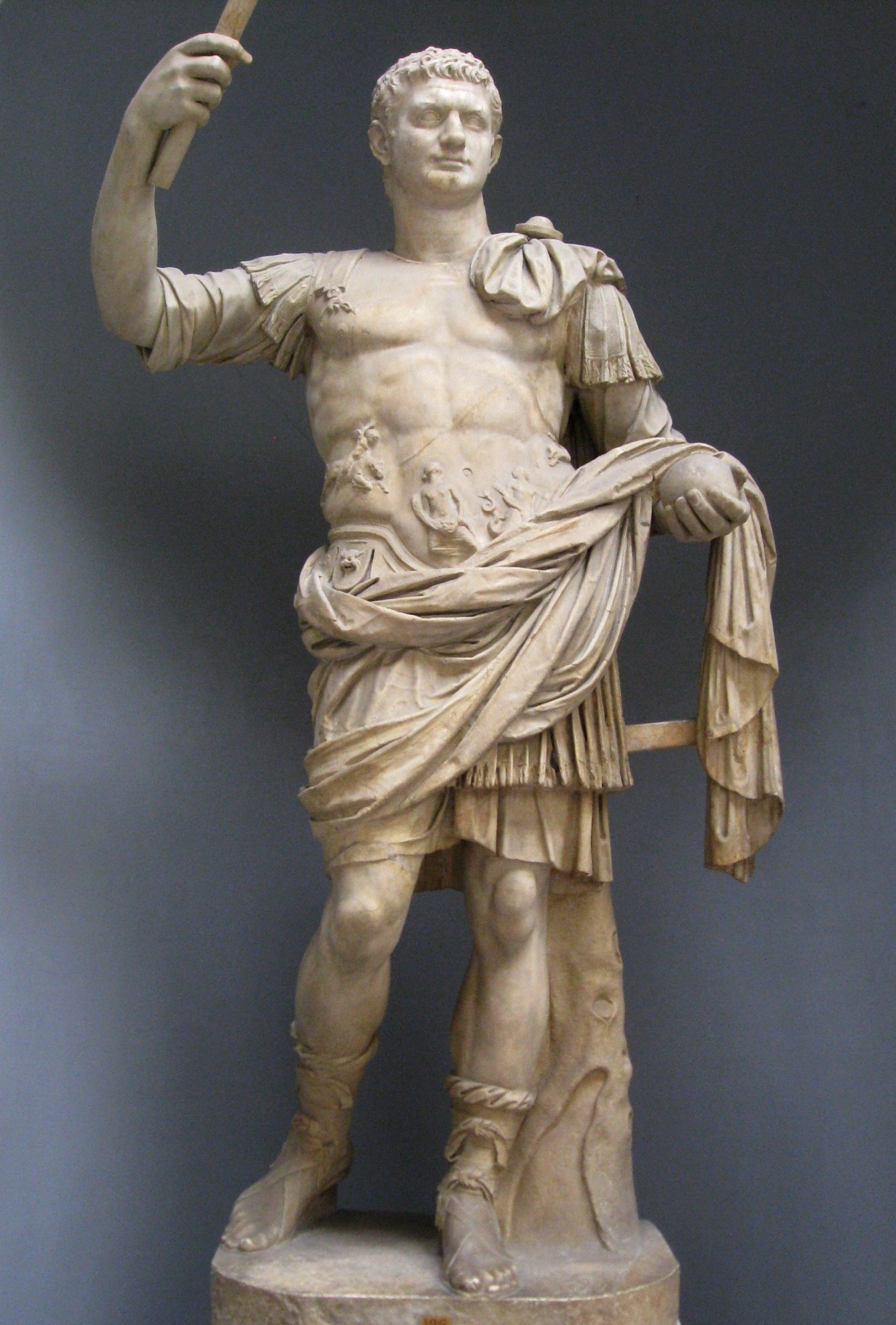
A Roman sculpture of Domitian from the Vatican Museum.

Like scholarship on the Thebaid, critical attitudes to the Silvae were decidedly negative in the late 19th and early 20th century when Statius' relationship to Domitian and his court caused him to fall out of favor with critics and readers, but in recent times, Statius has been reevaluated and his Silvae have been involved in his rehabilitation.

=== The Silvae and their context ===
Domitian and patronage are critical to an understanding of the Silvae and have caused the most difficulty for his critics and readers. Domitian's presence fills the collection, and Statius commemorates his construction projects, administration, and circle of courtiers. The content of the Silvae is primarily dictated by the needs of Statius' patrons, and many of the addressees come from the wealthy, privileged class of landowners and politicians. Statius' flattery of these elites has been interpreted in two ways by scholars; some, such as Carole Newlands, maintain that the collection is highly subversive and subtly expresses Statius' concerns about the autocratic tendencies of the Roman upper class. Others have argued that we cannot judge the standards of Roman panegyric by modern taste and urge a reading of the Silvae as individual pieces that respond to specific circumstances with their own unique viewpoints.

=== Style ===
Statius' style has been described as extremely elaborate ("mannerist") and has been connected with a specific bi-lingual, Greek cultural circle in Naples. Mythological examples, standard features (topoi), and elaborate description all enhance his praise of his patrons' lives and possessions. He also uses some standard types of rhetorical composition as noted by Menander Rhetor such as epithalamium, propempticon, and genethliacon. His use of mythological speakers at times has been interpreted subversively, as a device to both flatter clients and absolve the author of responsibility for the extreme praise the characters give. Many scholars have noted the tension between Statius' hasty mode of composition and the polished style of the pieces and have remarked on the poet's use of book arrangement and metrical choice to convey subtle meanings.

== Bibliography ==
Texts and Commentaries

- Coleman, K. Statius Silvae IV (Oxford, 1988)
- Gibson, B. Statius, Silvae 5 (Oxford, 2006)
- van Dam, H. Silvae, Book II: A commentary (Leiden, 1984)

English translations

- Mozley, J. H. Silvae, in Statius, vol. I (Loeb Classical Library, 1928)
- Nagle, Betty The Silvae of Statius (Bloomington, 2004)
- Shackleton-Bailey, D. R. Statius' Silvae (Cambridge, 2003)
- Slater, D. A. The Silvae of Statius (Oxford, 1908)

Studies

- Hardie, A. Statius and the Silvae: Poets, Patrons and Epideixis in the Graeco-Roman World (Liverpool, 1983)
- Newlands, C. Statius' Silvae and the Poetics of Empire (Cambridge, 2002)
- Newmyer, S. T. The Silvae of Statius: Structure and Theme (Leiden, 1979)
- Putnam, Michael; Augoustakis, Antony; Newlands, Carole (2023). The poetic world of Statius' Silvae. Oxford; New York: Oxford University Press. ISBN 9780192869272.
