= Titus Sextius (disambiguation) =

Titus Sextius was a Roman governor of Africa from 42 until 40 BC.

Titus Sextius may also refer to:

- Titus Sextius Africanus (suffect consul 59)
- Titus Sextius Magius Lateranus (consul 94)
- Titus Sextius Cornelius Africanus (consul 112)
- Titus Sextius Lateranus (consul 154)
- Titus Sextius Magius Lateranus (consul 197)
