= Rabiria gens =

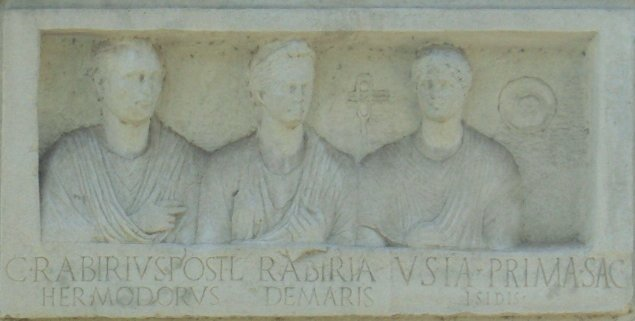
Monument of Gaius Rabirius Hermodorus, Rabiria Demaris, and Usia Prima, priestess of Isis. Located on the Via Appia, probably dating to the late first century BC. The original is at the Palazzo Massimo alle Terme in Rome

The gens Rabiria was a minor plebeian family at Ancient Rome. Although of senatorial rank, few members of this gens appear in history, and the only one known to have held any of the higher offices of the Roman state was Gaius Rabirius Postumus, who was praetor circa 48 or 47 BC.

== Origin ==
The great majority of Rabirii known from inscriptions lived in Italy, and a large family of this name seems to have lived at Tusculum, an ancient city of Latium not far from Rome. Another of the Rabirii bears the cognomen Tiburtinus, indicating that he or his ancestors probably came from Tibur, another city of northern Latium, not far from Rome and Tusculum, and strongly suggesting that the Rabirii were Latins.

== Praenomina ==
The chief praenomina of the Rabirii are Gaius and Publius, both of which were among the most common names throughout Roman history. Other praenomina appear sporadically, including Gnaeus, Lucius, Marcus, Numerius, Quintus, and Sextus.

== Members ==
This list includes abbreviated praenomina. For an explanation of this practice, see filiation.

- Gaius Rabirius, an elderly senator brought to trial in 63 BC on a charge of perduellio, based on his association with the mob that killed the tribune of the plebs Lucius Appuleius Saturninus nearly forty years earlier. Rabirius was defended by Cicero to no avail, but escaped death when the trial was interrupted by Quintus Caecilius Metellus Celer.
- Rabiria, sister of the senator Rabirius, married Gaius Curius, a publican, and was the mother of Gaius Rabirius Postumus.
- Gaius Rabirius C. f. Postumus, born Gaius Curius, was adopted by his uncle, the senator Gaius Rabirius. He earned his fortune as a money-lender, and his chief client was Ptolemy Auletes, the exiled King of Egypt. He was subsequently tried and banished for repetundae, or extortion, despite Cicero's defense in 54 BC, but was recalled by Caesar, under whom he served during the Civil War.
- Rabirius, an Epicurean philosopher.
- Gaius Rabirius, an epic poet of the early first century. He seems to have written about the civil wars that attended the end of the Republic.
- Rabirius, a physician and author on medical topics, mentioned by Pliny.
- Rabirius, an architect active during the reign of Domitian, whose palace has been attributed to Rabirius. His artistic skill and virtuous life are described by Martial.
- Rabiria, apparently the wife of a certain Cossus, presumably one of the Cornelii Lentuli, although which is uncertain.

=== Rabirii from inscriptions ===
- Rabiria, possibly the wife of Cornelius, named in a funerary inscription from Venusia in Apulia belonging to Rabiria Modesta, perhaps her daughter, dating between AD 71 and 130.
- Rabirius, named in an inscription from Tusculum in Latium.
- Rabirius, named in an inscription from Pompeii in Campania.
- Rabirius, named in an inscription from Rome.
- Gaius Rabirius, named together with Sextus Rabirius in an inscription from Fermum in Picenum.
- Gaius Rabirius M. f., named in n inscription from Tusculum.
- Gaius Rabirius, named in an inscription from Salernum in Campania, dating from the early or middle first century AD.
- Gnaeus Rabirius Cn. f., named in an inscription from Tusculum.
- Lucius Rabirius N. f., named in an inscription from Tusculum.
- Publius Rabirius, buried at Casilinum in Campania.
- Publius Rabirius, the former master of Rabiria Aucta, Rabiria Prima, Publius Rabirius Apollonius, and Publius Rabirius Dama.
- Publius Rabirius, the former master of Publius Rabirius Isio, Publius Rabirius Nicias, and Publius Rabirius Philargurus.
- Quintus Rabirius, the former master of Rabiria Demetria.
- Sextus Rabirius, named together with Gaius Rabirius in an inscription from Fermo.
- Gaius Rabirius Alexander, named in an inscription from Odessus in Moesia Inferior.
- Publius Rabirius P. l. Apollonius, a freedman buried at Rome.
- Rabiria P. Ɔ. l. Aucta, a freedwoman named in a funerary inscription from Rome.
- Rabiria Chrysa, buried at Rome with Rabiria Verna in a tomb built by their patron, Italus.
- Publius Rabirius P. l. Dama, a freedman buried at Rome.
- Rabiria Demaris, named in an inscription from Rome.
- Rabiria Q. l. Demetria, a freedwoman buried at Rome.
- Rabiria Donata, wife of Marcus Numisius Hilarus, named in an inscription from Casilinum.
- Gaius Rabirius Eniochus, a soldier in the century of Decimus Roetius Secundus, stationed at Rome in AD 70.
- Gaius Rabirius C. l. Faustus, a freedman named in an inscription from Rome, dating to between AD 6 and 10.
- Gaius Rabirius Postumi l. Hermodorus, a freedman, probably of Gaius Rabirius Postumus, named in an inscription from Rome.
- Gaius Rabirius C. l. Hilarius, a freedman and courier, buried at Narbo in Gallia Narbonensis.
- Publius Rabirius P. l. Hilarus, a freedman named in a funerary inscription from Rome.
- Publius Rabirius Hymnus, infant son of Rabiria Phoebe, buried at Puteoli in Campania, aged eight months and five days.
- Publius Rabirius P. Ɔ. l. Isio, a freedman buried at Rome.
- Rabiria Modesta, possibly the daughter of Cornelius and Rabiria, buried at Venusia, aged five?
- Publius Rabirius P. l. Nicias, a freedman buried at Rome.
- Rabiria Oecumene, buried at Rome in a tomb built by Lucius Marcius Antiochus, dating to the first century AD; perhaps the same Rabiria Eucumene mentioned in an inscription dating to AD 9.
- Publius Rabirius P. l. Philargurus, a freedman buried at Rome.
- Rabiria Phoebe, buried her infant son, Publius Rabirius Hymnus, at Puteoli.
- Rabiria Postuma, buried at Simitthus in Africa Proconsularis, aged nineteen.
- Rabiria P. Ɔ. l. Prima, a freedwoman named in a funerary inscription from Rome.
- Gaius Rabirius Primus, buried at Simitthus.
- Rabiria Spes, the wife of Nicolaus, buried at Carthage in Africa Proconsularis, aged thirty-seven.
- Publia Rabiria Ɔ. l. Sympha, a freedwoman buried at Rome.
- Gaius Rabirius Tiburtinus, named in an inscription from Ostia in Latium.
- Rabiria Verna, buried at Rome with Rabiria Chryse, in a tomb built by their patron, Italus.
- Rabiria Zabulia, buried at Simitthus, aged twenty-two.

== See also ==
- List of Roman gentes

== Bibliography ==
- Marcus Tullius Cicero, De Oratore, In Pisonem, Pro Gaio Rabirio Perduellionis Reo, Pro Gaio Rabirio Postumo.
- Aulus Hirtius (attributed), De Bello Africo (On the African War).
- Publius Ovidius Naso (Ovid), Epistulae ex Ponto (Letters from Pontus).
- Marcus Velleius Paterculus, Compendium of Roman History.
- Lucius Annaeus Seneca (Seneca the Younger), De Beneficiis (On Kindness).
- Gaius Plinius Secundus (Pliny the Elder), Historia Naturalis (Natural History).
- Marcus Fabius Quintilianus (Quintilian), Institutio Oratoria (Institutes of Oratory).
- Marcus Valerius Martialis (Martial), Epigrammata (Epigrams).
- Gaius Suetonius Tranquillus, De Vita Caesarum (Lives of the Caesars, or The Twelve Caesars).
- Lucius Cassius Dio Cocceianus (Cassius Dio), Roman History.
- Karl Otfried Müller, Handbuch der Archäologie der Kunst (Handbook of Ancient Art, or Ancient Art and its Remains), 3rd ed., J. Leitch, trans., London (1847).
- Dictionary of Greek and Roman Biography and Mythology, William Smith, ed., Little, Brown and Company, Boston (1849).
- Theodor Mommsen et alii, Corpus Inscriptionum Latinarum (The Body of Latin Inscriptions, abbreviated CIL), Berlin-Brandenburgische Akademie der Wissenschaften (1853–present).
- Notizie degli Scavi di Antichità (News of Excavations from Antiquity, abbreviated NSA), Accademia dei Lincei (1876–present).
- René Cagnat et alii, L'Année épigraphique (The Year in Epigraphy, abbreviated AE), Presses Universitaires de France (1888–present).
- Paul von Rohden, Elimar Klebs, & Hermann Dessau, Prosopographia Imperii Romani (The Prosopography of the Roman Empire, abbreviated PIR), Berlin (1898).
- Inscriptiones Italiae (Inscriptions from Italy, abbreviated InscrIt), Rome (1931-present).
- Herbert Bloch, "The Roman Brick-stamps Not Published in Volume XV 1 of Corpus Inscriptionum Latinarum" in Harvard Studies in Classical Philology, vols. LVI, LVII (1947).
- T. Robert S. Broughton, The Magistrates of the Roman Republic, American Philological Association (1952–1986).
- Elizabeth Rawson, Intellectual Life in the Late Roman Republic, Johns Hopkins University Press (1985).
