= Curia gens =

Ancient Roman family

The gens Curia was a plebeian family at ancient Rome. Members of this gens are first mentioned at the beginning of the third century BC, when the family was rendered illustrious by Manius Curius Dentatus.

== Praenomina used ==
The praenomen most closely associated with the Curii is Manius. However, other members of the gens bore the names Gaius and Quintus. It is uncertain whether the name Vibius, belonging to Vibius Curius, Caesar's general, was his praenomen, or if he was a member of the gens Vibia.

== Branches and cognomina ==
The only cognomen that occurs in the gens is Dentatus, meaning "toothed." It may originally have referred to someone with large or prominent teeth, but Manius Curius Dentatus is said to have derived his cognomen from the circumstance of having been born with teeth in his mouth.

== Members ==
This list includes abbreviated praenomina. For an explanation of this practice, see filiation.

- Manius Curius, grandfather of the consul of 290.
- Manius Curius M'. f., father of the consul of 290.
- Manius Curius M'. f. M'. n. Dentatus, consul in 290 BC, he triumphed over both the Samnites and the Sabines in the same year. He was consul again in 275 and 274, and censor in 272.
- Manius Curius (M'. n.), tribune of the plebs in 199 BC, he and his colleague, Marcus Fulvius, opposed the candidacy of Titus Quinctius Flamininus for the consulship, as Quinctius had held no curule office above that of quaestor.
- Manius Curius, party to a lawsuit concerning an inheritance, shortly before 91 BC. Curius was represented by Lucius Licinius Crassus, and his opponent by Quintus Mucius Scaevola. The trial attracted great attention because of the two eminent men who conducted it.
- Manius Curius, a friend of Cicero, who was quaestor urbanus in 61 BC, and tribunus plebis in 58. Somewhat later he was governor of a province with the title of proconsul.
- Manius Curius, another intimate friend of Cicero, who had known him from childhood, and described him as one of the kindest of men. He lived for several years at Patrae, where he was a negotiator, and was recommended by Cicero to Servius Sulpicius and Auctus, two governors of Achaia.
- Manius Curius, appointed judex by Marcus Antonius in 44 BC, despite his notoriety as a gambler.
- Gaius Curius, a man of equestrian rank, and brother-in-law of Gaius Rabirius, he was a farmer of the public revenue, by which he acquired great wealth, which he then spent with great kindness and benevolence. He was once accused of embezzling public money, but was honourably acquitted.
- Gaius Curius C. f., afterwards Gaius Rabirius Postumus, nephew of Gaius Rabirius, by whom he was adopted. Cicero successfully defended him against a senatorial accusation.
- Quintus Curius, a Roman senator, who had once held the office of quaestor, and came forward as a candidate for the consulship in 64 BC. His poor reputation and notoriety as a gambler led him to lose the election and be ejected from the senate. He was a friend of Catiline and a participant in his conspiracy, but betrayed the secret to his mistress, Fulvia, through whom it became known to Cicero. It is unknown whether he perished during the suppression of the conspiracy.
- Curius, attempted to betray Gnaeus Domitius Ahenobarbus in Bithynia, but paid with his life. Possibly the same as Quintus Curius, the former senator.
- Vibius Curius, a commander of the cavalry in Caesar's army, when he commenced the war against Pompeius in Italy. Several of Pompeius' generals at the time deserted to Curius.
- Curius Fortunatianus, said by Julius Capitolinus to have composed a history of the reigns of Maximinus Thrax and Balbinus.
- Curius Fortunatianus, a Roman lawyer, about the middle of the fifth century. He wrote a compendium of technical rhetoric from Greek and Latin authorities under the title, Curii Fortunatiani Consulti Artis Rhetoricae Scholicae Libri tres, once highly regarded as both comprehensive and concise. It was quoted by Cassiodorus.

== See also ==
- List of Roman gentes
