= Faustus (praenomen) =

Faustus (/ˈfaʊstəs/ or occasionally /ˈfɔːstəs/) is a Latin praenomen, or personal name. It was never particularly common at Rome, but may have been used more frequently in the countryside. The feminine form is Fausta. The name was not usually abbreviated, but is occasionally found abbreviated F. During the period of the Roman Empire, it was widely used as a cognomen, or surname. As the Roman nomenclature system began to break down towards the end of the Western Empire in the 4th and 5th centuries, Faustus once again became a personal name, and it has survived into modern times.

The best-known examples of this praenomen are from the family of the dictator Lucius Cornelius Sulla, who in 81 B.C. named his twin children Faustus and Fausta. The name continued to be used regularly by his descendants over the next two centuries. Other gentes from which examples are known include the Antistii, Decimii, Lartii, Paccii, Veidii, and Vibii; and perhaps also the Julii, Servii, and Sestii. Varro described this praenomen as obsolete in the 1st century BC, implying that it had once been more common; but it seems that by reviving it in his own family, Sulla may have started a trend which continued for some centuries, and probably also contributed to the popularity of the name as a cognomen.

== Origin and meaning ==
The meaning of Faustus is fortunate or lucky, a fact which probably inspired Sulla, who considered himself blessed by fortune. Indeed, this may have been the motivation behind many of the parents who gave this rare praenomen to their children. Another interesting example mentioned in the Realencyclopädie der Classischen Altertumswissenschaft was of two brothers named Faustus and Fortunatus. However, Fortunatus probably was not a genuine praenomen, but was chosen on that occasion simply because it was a synonym of Faustus.
