= Sextia gens =

Ancient Roman family

The gens Sextia was a plebeian family at ancient Rome, from the time of the early Republic and continuing into imperial times. The most famous member of the gens was Lucius Sextius Lateranus, who as tribune of the plebs from 376 to 367 BC, prevented the election of the annual magistrates, until the passage of the lex Licinia Sextia, otherwise known as the "Licinian Rogations," in the latter year. This law, brought forward by Sextius and his colleague, Gaius Licinius Calvus, opened the consulship to the plebeians, and in the following year Sextius was elected the first plebeian consul. Despite the antiquity of the family, only one other member obtained the consulship during the time of the Republic. Their name occurs more often in the consular fasti under the Empire.

== Origin ==
The nomen Sextius is a patronymic surname, derived from the praenomen Sextus, meaning "sixth". It is frequently confounded with that of the patrician gens Sestia, and in fact the two families may originally have been the same; however, Roman authors treated them as distinct gentes. The plebeian gens Sextilia was derived from the same praenomen.

== Praenomina ==
The main praenomina of the early Sextii were Marcus, Lucius, and Gaius, the most common names throughout all periods of Roman history. From filiations, we know that some of them also used Numerius and Sextus, of which the former was relatively uncommon at Rome. Later generations of this gens used Publius, Titus, and Quintus, all of which were also common. Epigraphy provides instances of Vibius, a name that was also used by the patrician Sestii, supporting the theory of a common origin.

== Branches and cognomina ==
Most of the Sextii under the Republic bore no surname, or else had only personal cognomina, instead of family-names. These included Baculus, Calvinus, Lateranus, Naso, Paconianus, and Sabinus.

== Members ==
This list includes abbreviated praenomina. For an explanation of this practice, see filiation.

- Marcus Sextius, tribune of the plebs in 414 BC, proposed that a colony should be sent to Bolae.
- Numerius Sextius, grandfather of Lucius Sextius Lateranus, the tribune.
- Sextus Sextius N. f., father of the tribune Lateranus.
- Lucius Sextius Sex. f. N. n. Sextinus Lateranus, tribune of the plebs with Gaius Licinius Calvus from 376 to 367 BC, succeeded in passing the lex Licinia Sextia, opening the consulship to the plebeians; in 366 he became the first plebeian consul.
- Marcus Sextius Sabinus, plebeian aedile in 203 BC, and praetor in the following year, obtained Gaul as his province.
- Sextius, quaestor of the consul Lucius Calpurnius Bestia in Numidia, in 111 BC.
- Publius Sextius, praetor designatus in 100 BC, was accused of bribery by Titus Junius, and condemned. He might be the same person as the quaestor of 111.
- Sextius, lictor of Verres in Sicily, and his favorite executioner.
- Publius Sextius Baculus, a centurion primus pilus with Caesar's army in Gaul, who distinguished himself on many occasions by his great bravery.
- Sextius Naso, one of the conspirators against Caesar in 44 BC.
- Quintus Sextius, (Note: "Marcus Silius" in Valerius Maximus.) conspired against Quintus Cassius Longinus, governor of Hispania Ulterior, in 48 BC. After the conspiracy was suppressed, Sextius purchased his life from Cassius in exchange for a large sum of money.
- Quintus Sextius, a Sextian philosopher during the time of Caesar; his works were admired by the younger Seneca.
- Sextius Niger, a Sextian physician during the early Empire, and author of a pharmacological work.
- Sextius Paconianus, one of the agents of Sejanus, who was imprisoned after his master's downfall in AD 31, and subsequently strangled for having written some libellous verses against the emperor.
- Lucius Aninius Sextius Florentinus, a second century Roman senator, entombed at Petra.

=== Sextii Calvini ===
- Gaius Sextius, grandfather of the consul of 124 BC
- Gaius C. f. Sextius, father of the consul of 124 BC
- Gaius Sextius C. f. C. n. Calvinus, consul in 124 BC, and afterwards assigned the administration of Gaul. He conquered the Salluvii, and founded the colony of Aquae Sextiae.
- Gaius C. f. Sextius Calvinus, described by Cicero as an excellent but sickly orator who stod as a candidate as praetor against Servilius Glaucia. He was probably a son of the consul and probably the same man as the praetor who restored the altar of an unknown deity. He may also have been the Gaius Calvinus who was a friend of Gaius Julius Caesar Strabo, described as only having one eye. Several historians have also identified him as the Sextius who was quaestor under Lucius Calpurnius Bestia in 111 BC.
- Publius Sextius Calvinus, Late Republican descendant of the consul of 124 BC, attested from a statue base in Thespiis

=== Sextii Africani ===
- Titus Sextius, one of Caesar's legates in Gaul, he subsequently held the province of Africa on behalf of the triumvirs, until the government was given to Marcus Aemilius Lepidus, in 40 BC.
- Sextia, the wife of Mamercus Aemilius Scaurus; they took their own lives after Scaurus was accused of maiestas in AD 34.
- Titus Sextius Africanus, was discouraged by Agrippina from marrying Junia Silana, the widow of Gaius Silius; in AD 62 he took the census in the provinces of Gaul.
- Sextia, the mother-in-law of Lucius Antistius Vetus; they were put to death by the emperor Nero in AD 65.
- Titus Sextius Magius Lateranus, consul in AD 94.
- Titus Sextius Cornelius Africanus, consul in AD 112 with the emperor Trajan.
- Titus Sextius Lateranus, consul in AD 154.
- Titus Sextius Magius Lateranus consul in AD 197.

== See also ==
- List of Roman gentes
- Sestia gens
- School of the Sextii

== Bibliography ==
- Marcus Tullius Cicero, Brutus, De Oratore, In Verrem.
- Gaius Julius Caesar, Commentarii de Bello Gallico (Commentaries on the Gallic War).
- Aulus Hirtius, De Bello Alexandrino (On the Alexandrine War).
- Gaius Sallustius Crispus (Sallust), Bellum Jugurthinum (The Jugurthine War).
- Titus Livius (Livy), History of Rome.
- Strabo, Geographica.
- Marcus Velleius Paterculus, Roman History.
- Valerius Maximus, Factorum ac Dictorum Memorabilium (Memorable Facts and Sayings).
- Lucius Annaeus Seneca (Seneca the Younger), Epistulae Morales ad Lucilium (Moral Letters to Lucilius), De Ira (On Anger).
- Publius Cornelius Tacitus, Annales.
- Appianus Alexandrinus (Appian), Bellum Civile (The Civil War).
- Dictionary of Greek and Roman Biography and Mythology, William Smith, ed., Little, Brown and Company, Boston (1849).
- George Davis Chase, "The Origin of Roman Praenomina", in Harvard Studies in Classical Philology, vol. VIII, pp. 103–184 (1897).
- T. Robert S. Broughton, The Magistrates of the Roman Republic, American Philological Association (1952–1986).
- Inge Mennen, Power and Status in the Roman Empire, AD 193–284, Brill (2011).
- Christian Settipani, Prosopographie sénatoriale romaine: nouveautés autour des Sextii, L’Année Epigraphique (2014).
