= Publius Sextilius =

Roman governor of Africa

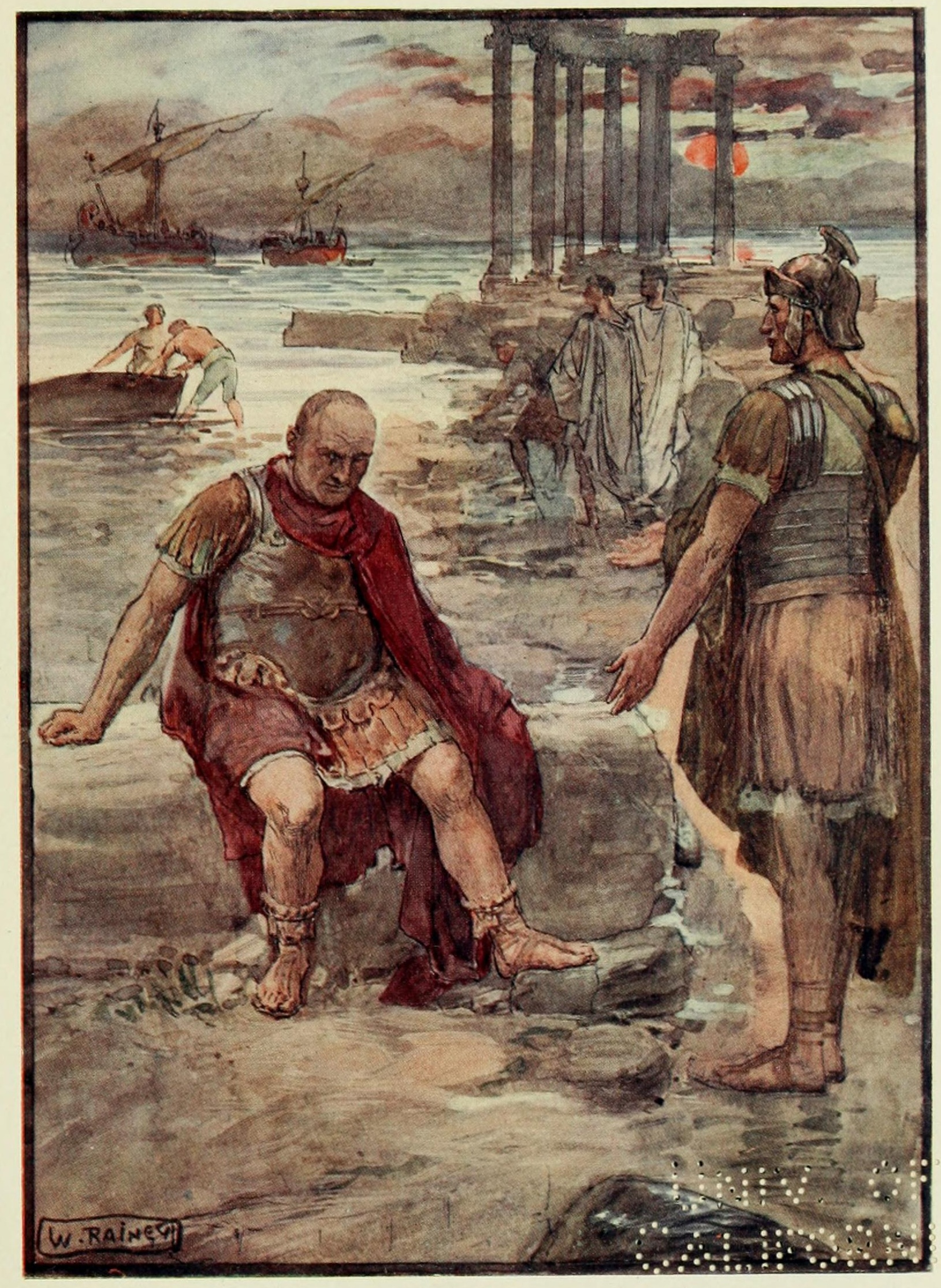
"Gaius Marius Sitting in Exile among the Ruins of Carthage" plate from The Story of Rome by Mary Macgregor

Publius Sextilius was a Roman praetor (92 BC?) and governor of Africa during the civil wars between Sulla and Marius. As governor in 88 BC, he refused Marius and his followers asylum in Africa.

== Marius in Africa ==
Plutarch presents a highly colored version of how Sextilius rejected Marius and furnishes a moral:

The Roman governor of Africa at this time was Sextilius, a man who had received neither good nor ill at the hands of Marius, but whom, as it was expected, pity alone would move to give him aid. Hardly, however, had Marius landed with a few companions, when an official met him, stood directly in front of him, and said: "Sextilius the governor forbids thee, Marius, to set foot in Africa; and if thou disobeyest, he declares that he will uphold the decrees of the senate and treat thee as an enemy of Rome." When he heard this, Marius was rendered speechless by grief and indignation, and for a long time kept quiet, looking sternly at the official. Then, when asked by him what he had to say, and what answer he would make to the governor, he answered with a deep groan: "Tell him, then, that thou hast seen Caius Marius a fugitive, seated amid the ruins of Carthage." And it was not inaptly that he compared the fate of that city with his own reversal of fortune.

Little is known of this Sextilius. It is likely that he belonged to the senatorial family of Sextilii who used the praenomen Publius, among them a 2nd-century B.C. praetor from whom a letter fragment survives. At one time, numismatic evidence was interpreted as referring to Sextilius as praetor and propraetor, but the coin has since been determined to belong to the Augustan period.

Before the arrival of Marius in Africa, Sextilius had taken a neutral position in the civil war. He had allowed some of Marius's allies to join up with Hiempsal II, king of Numidia, who at that time was attempting to gain the confidence of the Marians while acting on behalf of Sulla. If Sextilius had been serious about carrying out his threat to treat Marius as a public enemy — a senatorial decree which sanctioned his execution at sight — he most likely would have allowed Marius to enter the country rather than warning him off. The difficulty of Sextilius's position is indicated by the consequences of his action: since no further public office for him is known, he evidently pleased neither side in the conflict.

== Date of praetorship ==
Cicero writes of a P. Sextilius Rufus who claimed he was bound by his oath of office to follow the Lex Voconia in depriving a young woman of her inheritance. E. Badian has argued that this was the P. Sextilius who became governor of Africa and dates his praetorship to 92.

== Literary interests ==
There is some indication that Publius Sextilius took an interest in or was a patron of literature. When Cassius Dionysius of Utica translated the great agricultural treatise of the Carthaginian Mago into Greek, he dedicated his translation to Sextilius.
