= Accua =

Roman town of ancient Apulia, Italy

Accua was a small town of ancient Apulia, mentioned only by Livy as one of the places recovered by Quintus Fabius Maximus Verrucosus from the Carthaginians in the fifth year of the Second Punic War, 214 BCE. It appears from this passage to have been somewhere in the neighbourhood of Luceria, but its exact site is unknown. Vibius Accuaeus, was a native of Accua; he led a cohort of Paelignian soldiers in the Roman army in 212 BCE, during the Second Punic War, and fought with conspicuous bravery. It is not certain whether Vibius was his praenomen or his nomen.
