= Sestia gens =

Ancient Roman family

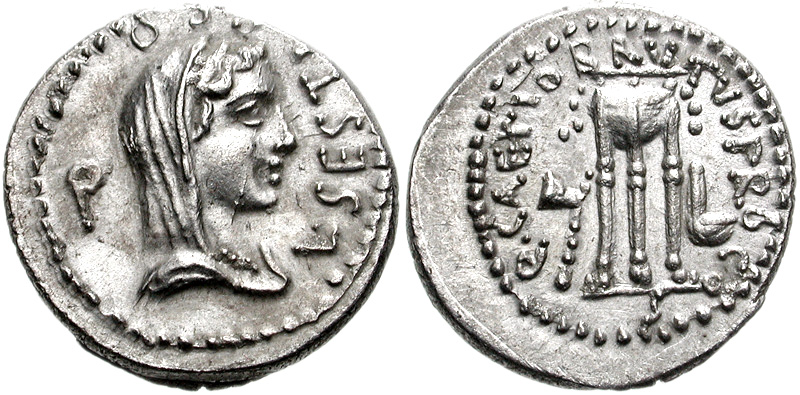
Coin of Lucius Sestius, consul suffectus in 23 BC

The gens Sestia (Sēstia) was a minor patrician family at ancient Rome. The only member of this gens to obtain the consulship in the time of the Republic was Publius Sestius Capitolinus Vaticanus, in 452 BC.

== Origin ==
The nomen Sestius is sometimes confused with that of Sextius, and these families may in fact share a common origin; but Roman writers considered them distinct gentes. If Sestius and Sextius are two forms of the same name, then Sestius is probably a patronymic surname, based on the common praenomen Sextus, meaning "sixth". The same name gave rise to the plebeian gens Sextilia. The plebeian Sestii known from the later Republic may have been descendants of freedmen, or of Sestii who relinquished their patrician status.

== Praenomina ==
The main praenomina used by the Sestii included Publius, Lucius, Vibius, and Titus. The Sestii are the only patrician family known to have used Vibius. Epigraphy also provides an example of the rare praenomen Faustus, although as it was borne by a freedwoman, it is unclear whether the name previously belonged to members of this ancient family.

== Branches and cognomina ==
The only cognomen of the early Sestii is Capitolinus, presumably referring to the Capitoline Hill, where the family must originally have lived. The consul of 452 BC bore the agnomen Vaticanus, apparently referring some association with the Vatican Hill, across the Tiber from the Capitol. Towards the end of the Republic, the surnames Pansa, meaning "splay-footed," and Gallus, a cock or a Gaul, are found.

== Members ==
This list includes abbreviated praenomina. For an explanation of this practice, see filiation.

- Vibius Sestius Capitolinus, grandfather of Publius Sestius Capitolinus, the consul of 452 BC.
- Publius Sestius V. f. Capitolinus, father of Publius, the consul of 452 BC.
- Publius Sestius P. f. V. n. Capitolinus Vaticanus, consul in 452 BC; the following year, he was one of the decemvirs charged with drawing up the first ten tables of Roman law.
- Publius Sestius, accused of murder by Gaius Julius Iulus, one of the decemvirs, in 451 BC; apparently a different man from the decemvir Capitolinus.
- Publius Sestius, quaestor in 414 BC.
- Lucius Sestius, (Note: Cicero calls him Lucius, but in the Capitoline Fasti, his grandson's filiation is P. f. Vibi n. The inconsistent names in Cicero and the Capitoline Fasti have led some to speculate that the grandson was a member of another family, although the substitution of a common praenomen for a rare one was quite common. Another explanation would be that the filiation in the Capitoline Fasti was "borrowed" from Sestius' ancestor, Publius Sestius Capitolinus Vaticanus, whose father and grandfather were named Publius and Vibius, respectively.) tribune of the plebs, probably early in the first century BC.
- Publius Sestius L. f., praetor in 53 BC; he was a friend and ally of Cicero, by whom he was defended in 56. He was with Pompeius on the outbreak of the Civil War, but subsequently went over to Caesar, who sent him into Cappadocia in 48 BC.
- Lucius Sestius Pansa, made a demand resisted by Quintus Tullius Cicero in 54 BC.
- Publius Sestius P. f., to whom Cicero wrote circa 53 BC, had been condemned for an unknown offense.
- Titus Sestius Gallus, owned the land where Publius Clodius Pulcher was slain in 52 BC.
- Lucius Sestius P. f. L. n. Albanianus Quirinalis, consul suffectus in 23 BC.
- Lucius Sestius L. l. Carres, a freedman buried in a first-century sepulchre at Rome, along with Fausta Sestia Amaryllis and Publius Caesenus Cerdo.
- Fausta Sestia Ɔ. l. Amaryllis, a freedwoman buried at Rome, age 20, shares her tomb with the freedmen Lucius Sestius Carres and Publius Caesenus Cerdo.

== See also ==
- List of Roman gentes
- Sextia gens

== Bibliography ==
- Marcus Tullius Cicero, Epistulae ad Familiares, Epistulae ad Quintum Fratrem, Pro Milone, Pro Sestio.
- Dionysius of Halicarnassus, Romaike Archaiologia (Roman Antiquities).
- Titus Livius (Livy), History of Rome.
- Sextus Pompeius Festus, Epitome de M. Verrio Flacco de Verborum Significatu (Epitome of Marcus Verrius Flaccus' On the Meaning of Words).
- Dictionary of Greek and Roman Biography and Mythology, William Smith, ed., Little, Brown and Company, Boston (1849).
- Theodor Mommsen et alii, Corpus Inscriptionum Latinarum (The Body of Latin Inscriptions, abbreviated CIL), Berlin-Brandenburgische Akademie der Wissenschaften (1853–present).
- George Davis Chase, "The Origin of Roman Praenomina", in Harvard Studies in Classical Philology, vol. VIII, pp. 103–184 (1897).
- D.P. Simpson, Cassell's Latin and English Dictionary, Macmillan Publishing Company, New York (1963).
- Ronald Syme, The Augustan Aristocracy, Clarendon Press, Oxford (1989).
