= Lucius Nonius Calpurnius Torquatus Asprenas =

Late 1st/early 2nd century Roman senator and consul

Lucius Nonius Calpurnius Torquatus Asprenas (fl. 1st century – 2nd century AD) was a Roman senator who achieved the office of consul ordinarius twice, first under Domitian and later under Hadrian.

== Biography ==
Torquatus Asprenas was the son of Lucius Nonius Calpurnius Torquatus Asprenas, who was a suffect consul between AD 72 and 74, and Arria. His sister was Calpurnia Arria (also referred to as Arria Calpurnia), who married Gaius Bellicus Natalis Tebanianus, suffect consul in 87.

An Augur, he was elected consul in AD 94, with Titus Sextius Magius Lateranus as his colleague. From 107 to 108, Torquatus Asprenas was appointed the Proconsular governor of Asia. He was appointed consul for a second time, in AD 128, when the consul designate Publius Metilus Nepos died before assuming office; Marcus Annius Libo was the colleague.

An inscription recovered in Athens attests that Asprenas had a daughter Torquata; she married Lucius Pomponius Bassus, consul in 118.

== Sources ==
- PIR ² N 133

Political offices
Preceded by Gaius Cornelius Rarus Sextius Naso, and Tuccius Cerialis as suffect consuls	Consul of the Roman Empire; 94 with Titus Sextius Magius Lateranus	Succeeded by Marcus Lollius Paulinus Decimus Valerius Asiaticus Saturninus, and Gaius Antius Aulus Julius Quadratus as suffect consuls
Preceded by Lucius Aemilius Juncus, and Sextus Julius Severus as suffect consuls	Consul of the Roman Empire; 128 with Marcus Annius Libo	Succeeded by Lucius Caesennius Antoninus, and Marcus Annius Libo as suffect consuls
