= Vibius (praenomen) =

Latin name

Vibius is a Latin praenomen, or personal name, which was occasionally used throughout the period of the Roman Republic and perhaps into imperial times. It gave rise to the patronymic gens Vibia. The feminine form is Vibia. As a praenomen, it was usually abbreviated V.

Although never especially common, the praenomen Vibius appears in a number of Roman families, including the gentes Anicia, Curia, Octavia, Oppia, Sestia, Sextia, and Vedia. The Sestii are the only patrician family known to have used the name, which, like many other praenomina, appears to have been more common in the countryside than at Rome.

== Origin and meaning of the name ==
Vibius appears to belong to that class of praenomina which was common to Latin, Oscan, and Umbrian. Chase cites a number of examples, mostly from Oscan and Umbrian families, and clearly the name was more common in other parts of Italy than at Rome. But the name was clearly used at Rome and treated as a Latin praenomen. It may be that it arrived in Rome shortly after the founding of the city, since much of the early Roman populace was of Sabine origin. However, because the name was seldom used by prominent families, there are few examples from this early period.

The meaning of the praenomen is unknown. Chase disposes of it after concluding that it was of Oscan origin, and cites no authorities on its possible meaning.

The Etruscan form of this praenomen was Vipie.
