= Gaius Cornelius Rarus Sextius Naso =

Late first century Roman senator and consul

Gaius Cornelius Rarus Sextius Naso was a Roman senator active during the last half of the first century AD. He was suffect consul for the nundinium September to December 93 with [...]lis as his colleague; the colleague may be Marcus Tuccius Cerialis, a suffect consul in an otherwise unknown year to whom Pliny the Younger wrote a letter full of tips on delivering a speech.

The existence of Cornelius Rarus is known only through a single inscription of the second century that apparently adorned the Arch of Trajan in Leptis Magna, which is badly damaged. He was proconsular governor of Africa in 108/109, when construction of the Arch began; it was completed during the tenure of his successor, Quintus Pomponius Rufus.

Cornelius Rarus was also a member of the prestigious collegium of quindecimviri sacris faciundis.

Political offices
Preceded by Titus Avidius Quietus, and Sextus Lusianus Proculus as suffect consuls	Suffect consul of the Roman Empire; 93 with [? Tuccius Ceria]lis	Succeeded by Lucius Nonius Calpurnius Torquatus Asprenas, and Titus Sextius Magius Lateranus as ordinary consuls
