= Vibia gens =

Family in ancient Rome

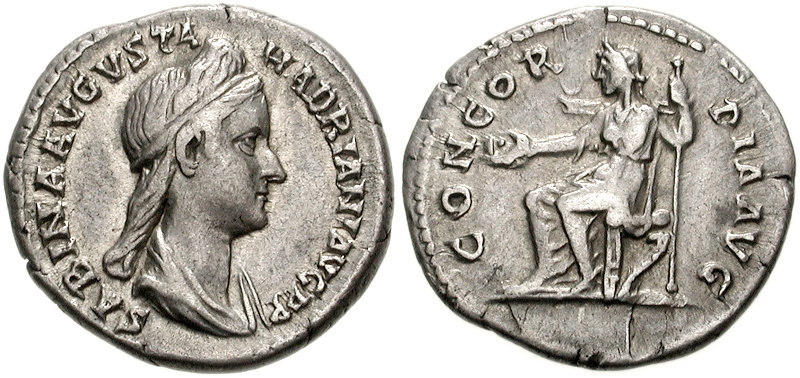
Denarius of Vibia Sabina, Roman empress from AD 117 to c. 136.

The gens Vibia was a plebeian family at ancient Rome. Although individuals named Vibius appear in history during the time of the Second Punic War, no members of this gens are found at Rome until the final century of the Republic. The first of the Vibii to obtain the consulship was Gaius Vibius Pansa in 43 BC, and from then until imperial times the Vibii regularly filled the highest offices of the Roman state. The emperors Trebonianus Gallus and Volusianus each claimed descent from the family.

== Origin ==
The nomen Vibius is a patronymic surname, derived from the praenomen Vibius. The name is generally regarded as an Oscan praenomen, and it is found extensively in Campania, but it was also used in Latium, and appears at Rome from a very early period, being used by the patrician Sestii, and occasionally by members of several prominent plebeian families. The Vibian gens itself was probably Oscan.

== Praenomina ==
The main praenomina of the Vibii were Gaius, Lucius, and Quintus. A family of imperial times used the praenomen Titus, while individual examples of Aulus and Sextus are known.

== Branches and cognomina ==
The cognomina of the Vibii under the Republic were Pansa and Varus, each of which occurs on coins. Both surnames derive from the physical characteristics of the persons to whom they originally applied; Pansa translates as "splay-footed", while Varus is "knock-kneed".

== Members ==
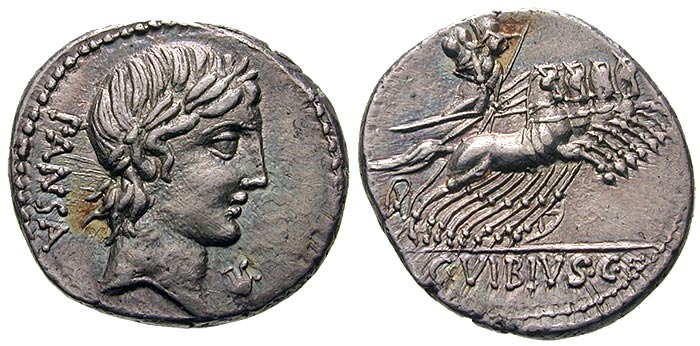
Denarius of Gaius Vibius Pansa, father of the consul Caetronianus, 90 BC.

This list includes abbreviated praenomina. For an explanation of this practice, see filiation.

- Vibius Accuaeus, a native of Accua, a village in Apulia, led a cohort of Paelignian soldiers in the Roman army in 212 BC, during the Second Punic War, and fought with conspicuous bravery. It is not certain whether Vibius was his praenomen or his nomen.
- Vibius Paciacus, or perhaps Pacianus, gave refuge to Crassus, who had fled to Hispania to escape the proscriptions of Marius and Cinna in 86 BC.
- Gaius Vibius C. f. Pansa, a moneyer, and the adoptive father of the consul Pansa Caetronianus.
- Vibius, a man who bore a great resemblance to Gnaeus Pompeius Magnus, and was frequently mistaken for the general.
- Lucius Vibius, an eques, leader of the publicani at Syracuse in the time of Verres.
- Sextus Vibius, a resident of Larinum, was murdered by Oppianicus.
- Vibius Cappadox, a resident of Larinum, whom Aulus Cluentius Habitus was accused of having poisoned.
- Vibius Curius, (Note: As in a few other cases, it is not certain whether Vibius was his praenomen or his nomen; if his praenomen, then he was a member of the Curia gens.) one of the commanders of Caesar's cavalry at the beginning of the Civil War. Several of Pompeius' generals went over to Caesar, and were accepted by Curius. He is probably the same Vibius who gave Cicero the books of the poet Alexander Lychnus.
- Gaius Vibius C. f. C. n. Pansa Caetronianus, consul in 43 BC, led the Roman forces against the supporters of Marcus Antonius at the Battle of Forum Gallorum, where he gained the victory thanks to the assistance of his colleague, Aulus Hirtius. Pansa was mortally wounded in the fighting, and died soon afterward.
- Gaius Vibius C. f. C. n. Postumus, (Note: Postimus in the Fasti Capitolini.) consul suffectus from the Kalends of July in AD 5. In AD 10, he helped quell a revolt of the Dalmatae, for which he received the triumphal ornaments. He was governor of Asia from 12 to 15.
- Aulus Vibius C. f. C. n. Habitus, consul suffectus from the Kalends of July in AD 8.
- Manius Vibius Balbinus, governor of Gallia Narbonensis from AD 15 to 17.
- Gaius Vibius Rufus, consul suffectus in AD 16.
- Gaius Vibius Serenus, one of the accusers of Marcus Scribonius Libo in AD 16. He was governor of Hispania Ulterior in 23, when he was condemned and exiled to the island of Amorgus in the Cyclades, on a charge of vis publica, riot or revolt, but in reality because he was an enemy of Sejanus. He was recalled the following year, after his own son accused him of plotting against Tiberius, but was subsequently returned to Amorgus.
- Gaius Vibius C. f. Marsus, consul suffectus from the Kalends of July in AD 17, and probably governor of Africa around AD 20. He was later accused of being one of the accomplices of Albucilla, but escaped condemnation by the death of Tiberius in 37. He was governor of Syria in 47.
- Vibia C. f. C. n., the daughter of the consul Marsus and his wife Laelia, married Publius Plautius Pulcher.
- Gaius Vibius C. f. Serenus, accused his exiled father of having plotted against Tiberius, together with Caecilius Cornutus, a former praetor. Cornutus took his own life before trial, but the elder Serenus vehemently proclaimed his innocence, and under torture his slaves supported him. The younger Serenus became a notorious delator, but his accusation of Gaius Fonteius Capito was not believed.
- Vibius Fronto, commander of the cavalry in Cilicia, captured Vonones, the deposed King of Parthia, during the latter's flight to Armenia in AD 19.
- Gaius Vibius Rufinus, consul suffectus in AD 40 or 41, and governor of Germania Superior from about 42 to 45.
- Vibia, or Vibidia, the wife of Lucius Arruntius Camillus Scribonianus, consul in AD 32, was exiled by Claudius in AD 53, along with her son, Lucius Arruntius Furius Scribonianus, on a charge of having consulted astrologers to determine the date of the emperor's death.
- Lucius Vibius (L. f.) Secundus, probably the elder brother of Quintus Vibius Crispus.
- Quintus Vibius (L. f.) Crispus, afterward Lucius Junius Quintus Vibius Crispus, a wealthy orator of considerable talent, was consul suffectus under Nero in AD 63 or 64, proconsul of Africa in 72 and 73, and consul for the second time in AD 74, with the future emperor Titus, from the Ides of March to the Ides of May. He received a third consulship under Domitian, in 82 or 83. Tacitus suggests that he gained his fortune as a delator in the reign of Nero.
- Vibia, a first-century wine merchant at Pompeii. She was associated with Caesia Helpis, a wine producer and merchant.
- Quintus Vibius Q. f. (L. n.) Secundus, consul suffectus from the Kalends of March to the Kalends of May in AD 86.
- Titus Vibius Catienus Sabinus, husband of a Maria N. f. Modia. Possibly identical with Titus Catienus Sabinus who was proconsul of Cyprus in 43.
- Lucius Vibius Sabinus consul suffectus some time in the latter part of the first century, married Salonia Matidia, the niece of Trajan, and was the father of the empress Vibia Sabina.
- Lucius Vibius Lentulus, fiscal secretary under Trajan, was the first known eques to hold the position, which had formerly been entrusted to freedmen.
- Gaius Vibius Maximus, governor of Egypt from AD 103 to 107.
- Vibia, the wife of Titus Sextius Cornelius Africanus, consul in AD 112, and mother of Titus Sextius Lateranus, consul in 154.
- Titus Vibius Varus, consul suffectus from the Kalends of September in AD 115.
- Vibia L. f. Sabina, daughter of the consul Lucius Vibius Sabinus, became the wife of Hadrian, and Roman empress from AD 117 to her death, about 136.
- Vibia L. f. (Matidia), possibly a sister of empress Sabina proposed by some historians. (Note: Christian Settipani has speculated that she might have been married to Marcus Annius Libo, but based on the names of his descendants his wife was more likely a member of the Flavii Sabini.)
- Quintus Vibius Gallus, consul in AD 119.
- Gaius Julius Lupus Titus Vibius Varus Laevillus, quaestor in Asia in AD 132.
- Titus Vibius Varus, consul in AD 134.
- Titus Clodius Vibius Varus, consul in AD 160.
- Vibia Perpetua, said to have been a young mother, martyred as a Christian at Carthage in AD 203.
- Gaius Vibius Trebonianus Gallus, had been consul and governor of Moesia Superior, was proclaimed emperor in AD 251. He was slain in August, 253, as Aemilian marched on Rome.
- Gaius Vibius C. f. Volusianus, the son of Trebonianus Gallus, was proclaimed emperor alongside his father, following the death of Hostilian in 251. Volusianus was slain along with his father in 253.
- Vibia Galla, the daughter of Trebonianus Gallus.
- Vibius Passienus, according to Trebellius Pollio, proconsul of Africa during the reign of Gallienus. He is said to have proclaimed Titus Cornelius Celsus, a former military tribune, emperor, during the unrest of AD 265. The rebellion was quashed, and Celsus slain, within a week. The historicity of the entire episode is doubted by modern scholars.
- Vibius Sequester, the author of a treatise naming and briefly describing various geographical features found in Roman poets, including rivers, springs, lakes, woods, swamps, and mountains. He may have borrowed from Servius, which would place him in the fifth century.
- Vibius, the engraver of a carnelian intaglio depicting Othryades.

== See also ==
- List of Roman gentes

== Bibliography ==
- Marcus Tullius Cicero, Epistulae ad Atticum, Epistulae ad Familiares, In Verrem, Pro Cluentio.
- Gaius Julius Caesar, Commentarii de Bello Civili (Commentaries on the Civil War).
- Titus Livius (Livy), History of Rome.
- Marcus Velleius Paterculus, Compendium of Roman History.
- Valerius Maximus, Factorum ac Dictorum Memorabilium (Memorable Facts and Sayings).
- Gaius Plinius Secundus (Pliny the Elder), Historia Naturalis (Natural History).
- Marcus Fabius Quintilianus (Quintilian), Institutio Oratoria (Institutes of Oratory).
- Publius Cornelius Tacitus, Annales, Historiae, Dialogus de Oratoribus (Dialogue on Oratory).
- Plutarchus, Lives of the Noble Greeks and Romans.
- Lucius Annaeus Florus, Epitome de T. Livio Bellorum Omnium Annorum DCC (Epitome of Livy: All the Wars of Seven Hundred Years).
- Lucius Cassius Dio Cocceianus (Cassius Dio), Roman History.
- Aelius Lampridius, Aelius Spartianus, Flavius Vopiscus, Julius Capitolinus, Trebellius Pollio, and Vulcatius Gallicanus, Historia Augusta (Augustan History).
- Eutropius, Breviarium Historiae Romanae (Abridgement of the History of Rome).
- Sextus Aurelius Victor, De Caesaribus (On the Caesars), Epitome de Caesaribus (attributed).
- Zosimus, Historia Nova (New History).
- Jordanes, Getica.
- Joannes Zonaras, Epitome Historiarum (Epitome of History).
- Anne Claude de Caylus, Recueil d'Antiquités Égyptiennes, Étrusques, Greques, Romaines et Gauloises (Collection of Egyptian, Etruscan, Greek, Roman, and Gallic Antiquities), Paris (1752–1755).
- Joseph Hilarius Eckhel, Doctrina Numorum Veterum (The Study of Ancient Coins, 1792–1798).
- Desiré-Raoul Rochette, Lettre à M. Schorn, Firmin Didot Frères, Paris (1832).
- Dictionary of Greek and Roman Biography and Mythology, William Smith, ed., Little, Brown and Company, Boston (1849).
- Theodor Mommsen et alii, Corpus Inscriptionum Latinarum (The Body of Latin Inscriptions, abbreviated CIL), Berlin-Brandenburgische Akademie der Wissenschaften (1853–present).
- Dictionary of Greek and Roman Geography, William Smith, ed., Little, Brown and Company, Boston (1854).
- René Cagnat et alii, L'Année épigraphique (The Year in Epigraphy, abbreviated AE), Presses Universitaires de France (1888–present).
- George Davis Chase, "The Origin of Roman Praenomina", in Harvard Studies in Classical Philology, vol. VIII, pp. 103–184 (1897).
- Ronald Syme, The Roman Revolution, Oxford University Press (1939), Ammianus and the Historia Augusta, Clarendon Press, Oxford (1968).
- Anthony R. Birley, Marcus Aurelius, B. T. Batsford, London (1966).
- E. Mary Smallwood, Documents Illustrating the Principates of Nerva, Trajan, and Hadrian, Cambridge University Press (1966).
- G. V. Sumner, "The Lex Annalis under Caesar", in Phoenix, vol. 25, No. 3 (1971).
- Paul A. Gallivan, "Some Comments on the Fasti for the Reign of Nero", in Classical Quarterly, vol. 24, pp. 290–311 (1974), "The Fasti for the Reign of Claudius", in Classical Quarterly, vol. 28, pp. 407–426 (1978), "The Fasti for A.D. 70–96", in Classical Quarterly, vol. 31, pp. 186–220 (1981).
- Guido Bastianini, "Lista dei prefetti d'Egitto dal 30^{a} al 299^{p}" (List of the Prefects of Egypt from 30 BC to AD 299), in Zeitschrift für Papyrologie und Epigraphik, vol. 17 (1975).
- A.L.F. Rivet, Gallia Narbonensis, Batsford, London (1988).
- Olli Salomies, Adoptive and Polyonymous Nomenclature in the Roman Empire, Societas Scientiarum Fennica, Helsinki (1992).
- Piotr Berdowski, "Roman Businesswomen: I: The Case of the Producers and Distributors of Garum in Pompeii", in Analecta Archaeologica Ressoviensia vol. III (2008), pp. 251–271.
- Werner Eck, Paul Holder, and Andreas Pangerl, "A Diploma for the Army of Britain in 132 and Hadrian's Return to Rome from the East", in Zeitschrift für Papyrologie und Epigraphik, vol. 194 (2010).
- Alison E. Cooley, The Cambridge Manual of Latin Epigraphy, Cambridge University Press (2012).
- Emily Hemelrijk and Greg Woolf, Women and the Roman City in the Latin West, Brill (2013).
- B. Longfellow, The Lives and Deaths of Women in Ancient Pompeii, University of Texas Press (2025).
