= Sextilia gens =

Ancient Roman family

The gens Sextilia was a plebeian family at ancient Rome. The first member of this gens to achieve prominence was Gaius Sextilius, consular tribune in 379 BC. None of the family obtained the consulship, but they endured throughout Roman history from the early Republic into imperial times.

== Origin ==
The nomen Sextilius is a patronymic surname, derived from the praenomen Sextus. The nomen of the gens Sextia was derived from the same name, much as the praenomen Quintus gave rise to the gentes Quinctia and Quinctilia.

== Praenomina ==
The praenomina used by the Sextilii included Gaius, Lucius, Marcus, Publius, and Quintus, all of which were very common throughout Roman history. Although Sextilius was derived from Sextus, none of the Sextilii known to history bore that name.

== Branches and cognomina ==
The Sextilii were not divided into families with distinctive surnames. Most of the Sextilii under the Republic bore no cognomen, but a few surnames are found in later times and under the Empire.

== Members ==
- Gaius Sextilius, tribunus militum consulari potestate in 379 BC, in which year an equal number of patricians and plebeians were elected to the office.
- Sextilia, a Vestal Virgin, who was condemned for incest, and buried alive in 273 BC.
- Lucius Sextilius, one of the tresviri nocturni, who were accused by the tribunes of the plebs, and condemned, because they had arrived too late to put out a fire in the Via Sacra.
- Marcus Sextilius, of Fregellae, assured the consuls of 209 BC, during the Second Punic War, that eighteen of the Roman colonies were ready to furnish the state with soldiers, when twelve had refused to do so.
- Publius Sextilius, governor of Africa in 88 BC, forbade Marius to land in the country.
- Sextilius, an Etruscan, betrayed Gaius Julius Caesar Strabo to the assassins of Marius and Cinna, in 87 BC, although he had previously been defended by Caesar, when accused of a very grave offense.
- Sextilius, legate of Lucius Licinius Lucullus during the Mithridatic War, was sent to attack Tigranocerta.
- Sextilius, a praetor, was carried off by the pirates, shortly before Pompeius was appointed to the command of the war against them.
- Aulus Sextilius, a negotiator or money-lender in Acmonia, a town in Phrygia, described by Cicero as a homo improbus.
- Gaius Sextilius, the nephew of Marcus Aufidius Lurco, described by Cicero as a man et pudens et constans et gravis. He may be the same man as the praetor Sextilius mentioned by Varro.
- Publius Sextilius, quaestor in 61 BC.
- Quintus Sextilius, a friend of Titus Annius Milo.
- Sextilius Andro, of Pergamum, mentioned by Cicero.
- Publius Sextilius Rufus, succeeded to the property of Quintus Fadius Gallus in a dishonorable manner.
- Gaius Sextilius Rufus, quaestor in Cyprus in 47 BC. In the wars following the death of Caesar, he commanded the fleet of Gaius Cassius Longinus.
- Sextilius Hena, a poet of Corduba, in Hispania, wrote a poem on the death of Cicero, of which the first line is quoted by Seneca.
- Sextilia, a virtuous Roman matron, and the mother of the emperor Vitellius; she lived to see her son emperor, but died shortly before his fall.
- Sextilius Felix, was stationed on the frontiers of Raetia by Marcus Antonius Primus in AD 70, to watch the movements of Porcius Septimius, procurator of the province under Vitellius. There he remained until the following year, when he helped to quell an insurrection of the Treviri.
- Sextilius Agesilaus Aedesius, vicar of Hispania between 355 and 376.

== See also ==
- List of Roman gentes
