= Titus Sextius Lateranus =

2nd-century Roman senator and consul

Titus Sextius Lateranus was a Roman senator active in the second century AD. He was ordinary consul in the year 154 as the colleague of Lucius Verus. Lateranus is also known by a more full name, which has been restored in two different ways: Titus Sextius Lateranus M. Vibius Ovel[lius?...] Secundus L. Vol[usius Torquatus?] Vestinus, or Titus Sextius ... M. Vibius Qui[etus?] Secundus L. Vol[usius Torquatus?] Vestinus.

Lateranus was a member of the Roman Republican gens Sextia. He was the son of Titus Sextius Cornelius Africanus, consul in 112, by his wife, a noblewoman from the gens Vibia.

The cursus honorum for Lateranus can be reconstructed from an inscription from Rome. That this inscription attests he was a member of the tresviri monetalis, the most prestigious of the four boards that comprised the vigintiviri, and performed his duties as a quaestor for the Emperor indicates he became a member of the patrician order. His status also explains the absence of any office between quaestor and his consulate except for praetor. At an unknown date he was a member of the sodales Hadrianales, a priesthood dedicated to performing rituals honoring the deified emperor Hadrian. He served as a Proconsul of the Province of Africa in 168/169, considered the apex of a successful senatorial career.

Lateranus was the father of Titus Sextius Magius Lateranus, ordinary consul in 197.

== Sources ==
- CIL VI, 41131
- J. Bennett, Trajan: Optimus Princeps: a Life and Times, Routledge, 1997
- Biographischer Index der Antike (Google eBook), Walter de Gruyter, 2001
- I. Mennen, Power and Status of the Roman Empire, AD 193-284, BRILL, 2011

Political offices
Preceded by Gaius Cattius Marcellus, and Quintus Petiedius Gallus	Consul of the Roman Empire; 154 with Lucius Aelius Aurelius Commodus	Succeeded by (Prifernius?) Paetus, and Marcus Nonius Macrinus
