= Sextius Paconianus =

Agent of Sejanus (died 35 AD)

Sextius Paconianus an agent of Sejanus. He was of prætorian rank. He caused the death of Sejanus, apparently to the satisfaction of the senators, for Sejanus had oft betrayed secrets entrusted to him by the Senate.

Paconianus was complicit in a plot against Gaius initiated by Sejanus, to the end of having him (Gaius) liquidated, for which he received a death sentence in 32 AD, with the option of reprieve should he provide information, which he subsequently proceeded to do. He lingered in prison until 35 AD, and was ultimately killed by strangulation while there for writing verses about emperor Tiberius which were subsequently deemed libellous.
