= Titus Sextius Cornelius Africanus =

Late 1st/early 2nd century Roman senator and consul

Titus Sextius Cornelius Africanus, also known as Titus Sextius Africanus, was a Roman Senator who lived in the Roman Empire in the second half of the 1st century and first half of the 2nd century. He served as an ordinary consul in 112 as the colleague of emperor Trajan.

Africanus was a member of the Roman Republican gens Sextia. He was the son of Titus Sextius Magius Lateranus, ordinary consul in 94, and his wife Volusia Torquata.

== Family ==
Africanus married a Roman noblewoman from the gens Vibia, and their children are known to include:

- Sextia (born c. 120), who married Appius Claudius Pulcher, a suffect consul of the 2nd century;
- Titus Sextius Lateranus, also known by his full name T. Sextius Lateranus M. Vibius Ovel[lius?...] Secundus L. Vol[usius Torquatus?] Vestinus or Titus Sextius… Marcus Vibius Qui[etus(?)] Secundus Lucius Vol[usius Torquatus (?)] Vestinus. He served as ordinary consul in 154 as the colleague of emperor Lucius Verus.

== Sources ==
- J. Bennett, Trajan: Optimus Princeps: a Life and Times, Routledge, 1997
- Biographischer Index der Antike (Google eBook), Walter de Gruyter, 2001
- I. Mennen, Power and Status of the Roman Empire, AD 193-284, BRILL, 2011

Political offices
Preceded by Lucius Octavius Crassus, and Publius Coelius Apollinaris as Suffect consuls	Consul of the Roman Empire; 112 with Trajan IV, followed by Marcus Licinius Ruso	Succeeded by Gnaeus Pinarius Cornelius Severus, and Lucius Mummius Niger Quintus Valerius Vegetus as Suffect consuls
