= Titus Sextius Magius Lateranus (consul 94) =

1st century Roman senator and consul

Titus Sextius Magius Lateranus was a Roman senator who lived during the second half of the 1st century and first half of the 2nd century. Lateranus served as a consul ordinarius in 94 as the colleague of Lucius Nonius Calpurnius Torquatus Asprenas. He is known entirely from inscriptions.

In his monograph on Roman naming practices, Olli Salomies points out that the short form of his name was Titus Sextius Lateranus, showing he was a member of the gens Sextia. Based on the inscription CIL VI, 1518 his relatives included Titus Sextius Africanus, suffect consul in 59. The third element in his name, "Magia", may indicate his mother came from the Magii, a praetorian family.

Lateranus married the Roman noblewoman Volussia Torquata, one of the children of Quintus Volusius Saturninus and his wife Nonia Torquata. Their children included Titus Sextius Cornelius Africanus, who served as a consul in 112.

== Sources ==
- Julian Bennett, Trajan: Optimus Princeps: a Life and Times, Routledge, 1997
- Biographischer Index der Antike (Google eBook), Walter de Gruyter, 2001

Political offices
Preceded by G. Cornelius Rarus Sextius Naso; Tuccius Cerialis as suffecti	Consul of the Roman Empire; 94 with Lucius Nonius Calpurnius Torquatus Asprenas	Succeeded by M. Lollius Paulinus D. Valerius Asiaticus Saturninus; G. Antius A. Julius Quadratus as suffecti
