= Gaius Rabirius Postumus =

1st-century Roman banker

Gaius Rabirius Postumus was a Roman banker. He is notable for having been defended by Cicero (54 BC) in the extant speech Pro Rabirio Postumo, when charged with extortion in Egypt and complicity with Aulus Gabinius. Rabirius was a member of the equites order who lent a very large sum of money to Ptolemy XII Auletes, king of Egypt. Afterwards, Auletes, in lieu of repaying the money, appointed Rabirius as his finance minister (dioiketes) and gave him license to recoup his debts by collecting taxes from the Egyptian subjects. After one year, the Alexandrian people, exasperated by Rabirius' exactions, rioted, and Auletes had Rabirius imprisoned. The latter escaped to Rome, where he was accused by the Senate of Rome. He was defended by Cicero and acquitted on a technicality.

== See also ==
- Gaius Rabirius (senator)
- Rabiria gens
