= Gaius Rabirius (poet) =

Gaius Rabirius was a poet mentioned by Velleius alongside Virgil. He is also mentioned by Ovid and Quintilian. Some authorities consider him the author of a poem on Actium of which a fragment was found at Herculaneum. Papyrus fragments discovered there included sixty-seven (mutilated) hexameters, referring to the final struggle between Antony and Octavian and the death of Cleopatra. They are generally supposed to be part of a poem by Rabirius, since Seneca (De Benef. vi. 3, i) informs us that he wrote on those subjects. If genuine, they justify the qualified commendation of Quintilian rather than the praise of Velleius Paterculus (ii. 36, 3), who couples Rabirius and Virgil as the two most eminent poets of his time.

Fragments in Emil Baehrens, Fragmenta Poetarum Romanorum (1885); W. Scott, Fragmenta Herculanensia (Oxford, 1885); O. Ribbeck, Geschichte der romischen Dichtung, ii. (1889); Teuffel, History of Roman Literature (Eng. trans., 1900), 252, 9.
