= Gaius Rabirius (senator) =

Roman senator

Gaius Rabirius was a Roman senator who was involved in the death of Lucius Appuleius Saturninus in 100 BC. In 63 BC, Titus Labienus, a Tribune of the Plebs whose uncle had lost his life among the followers of Saturninus on that occasion, was urged by fellow senator and patron Julius Caesar to accuse Rabirius of participating in the murder. Caesar's real objective was to warn the Senate against interference by force with popular movements, to uphold the sovereignty of the people and the inviolability of the person of the tribunes, at the time of the conspiracy of Lucius Sergius Catilina. The obsolete accusation of perduellio was revived, and the case was heard before Caesar and his cousin Lucius Julius Caesar as commissioners specially appointed (duumviri perduellionis).

Rabirius was condemned, and the people, to whom the accused had exercised the right of appeal, were on the point of ratifying the decision, when Quintus Caecilius Metellus Celer pulled down the military flag from the Janiculum, which was equivalent to the dissolution of the assembly. Caesar's object having been attained, the matter was then allowed to drop. The defense was taken by Marcus Tullius Cicero, consul at the time; the speech is extant: Pro Rabirio reo perduellionis.

A nephew, Gaius Rabirius Postumus was also defended by Cicero.

== In fiction ==
- Robert Harris included Rabirius's trial in his book Lustrum.
- Colleen McCullough included Rabirius's trial in Caesar's Women.

== See also ==
- Rabiria gens
