= Perduellio =

Offense of treason in Ancient Rome

In the early days of Ancient Rome, perduellio (Latin: [pɛrdʊˈɛllɪ.oː]) was the capital offense of high treason, although it was not well defined. The form of action on this charge changed over the course of the Roman republic. The word later became just an intensifier for the more common treason charge (maiestas). It was set down plainly in the Law of the Twelve Tables as follows:

The Law of the Twelve Tables orders that he who has stirred up an enemy or who has handed over a citizen to the enemy is to be punished capitally. (Marcianus, D. 48, 4, 3).

Under the terms of this law, those convicted of perduellio were subject to death either by being hanged from the arbor infelix (a tree deemed to be unfortunate) or by being thrown from the Tarpeian Rock. Their families were not allowed to mourn them and their houses were razed.

== History ==
As the concept of national sovereignty took hold in Rome, perduellio also came to mean an offense which “injured or brought into danger the dignity, supremacy, and power of the commonwealth [Roman State]”. This included such things as losing an army, violating the rights of the tribunes of the plebs, or usurping a function of the State (as in the case of Horatius).

In the Ab Urbe Condita, Livy recorded the first instance of both a trial of perduellio and appeal:

It enraged the fiery youth to hear his sister’s lamentations in the hour of his own victory and the nation’s great rejoicing. And so, drawing his sword and at the same time angrily upbraiding her, he ran her through the body…The king…said: “In accordance with the law I appoint duumvirs to pass judgment upon Horatius for treason [perduellio]. The dread formula or the law ran thus: ‘Let the duumvirs pronounce him guilty of treason; if he shall appeal from the duumvirs, let the appeal be tried; if the duumvirs win, let the lictor veil his head, let [the lictor] suspend him with a rope from a barren tree [arbor infelix]; let [the lictor] scourge him either within or without the pomerium.’ Even though the duumvirs found Horatius guilty, Horatius was allowed to appeal (to the people) and by them was acquitted. However, Horatius’ father had to perform expiatory rites and Horatius himself was forced to pass under the yoke.

But over time with the expansion of the rights of Roman citizens, the use of corporal punishment lessened until the time of Augustus when conviction only carried with it the punishment of aquae et ignis interdictio (exile).

In the kingdom and the early republic, trials were conducted the duumviri perduellionis, who during the Monarchy were appointed by the king. Later on during the Republic they were proposed by the consuls and formally appointed by the comitia (comitia curiata or comitia centuriata). Judgement of the duumviri was not subject to provocatio (appeal). By the third century BC, prosecutions were led by the plebeian tribunes before the assembly but by the late republic, this form of action had become obsolete due to the formation of the permanent court on treason. While obsolete, it could still be revived: eg the case of Gaius Rabirius in 63 BC.

During the empire, perduellio became the designation for a particularly odious type of maiestas.
