= Servia gens =

Ancient Roman family

The gens Servia was a minor plebeian family at ancient Rome. Few members of this gens are mentioned in ancient writers, but a number are known from inscriptions.

== Origin ==
The nomen Servius derives from the praenomen Servius, without a change in form; this causes the two names to be easily confused. Chase classifies it among those gentilicia that either originated at Rome, or cannot be shown to have come from anywhere else. The praenomen was probably derived from servare, "to protect" or "keep safe", and presumably the Servii obtained their nomen from an ancestor of this name. Other gentes were derived from the same praenomen using different forms; the most famous was the gens Servilia, prominent throughout Roman history.

== Praenomina ==
The Servii used a variety of praenomina, particularly Lucius, Publius, Manius, Marcus, Gaius, and Numerius. Although the others were very common, Manius was somewhat more distinctive, while Numerius, while widespread, was not particularly common. Other praenomina occur infrequently among the Servii, although Statius appears in a filiation. This praenomen, uncommon at Rome, was widespread in the Oscan-speaking regions of central and southern Italy.

== Members ==
This list includes abbreviated praenomina. For an explanation of this practice, see filiation.

- Servia M. f. Cinsi uxor, the wife of Cinsius, named in an inscription from Praeneste in Latium, dating between 250 and 170 BC.
- Publius Servius N. l., a freedman and purpurarius, or dyer of purple, named in an inscription from Capua in Campania, dating to 105 BC.
- Publius Servius P. l. Thraso, a freedman named in a dedicatory inscription from Asisium in Latium, dating to 100 BC.
- Servius Pola, an enemy of Cicero, who describes him as "foul and uncivilized". He might be the same Servius who was elected tribune of the plebs in 51 BC, and was condemned for bribery before taking office; but the nomen of this person was probably Servaeus.
- Lucius Servius Rufus, a moneyer who in 41 BC issued denarii and aurei featuring the head of a bearded man, possibly representing Lucius Junius Brutus, (Note: The figure has also been identified as Servius Sulpicius Rufus, three times consular tribune in the early fourth century BC; but this identification seems to be the result of confusion between the nomen of the moneyer and the praenomen of the consular tribune; there seems to be no other evidence.) as a statement of support for Marcus Junius Brutus, along with the Dioscuri. He was probably a native of Tusculum.
- Lucius Taurius L. f. Servius Aefolanus, named in an inscription from Carthago Nova in Hispania Citerior, dating to the last part of the first century BC.
- Salvia Servia M. l., a freedwoman buried at Rome between about 30 BC and AD 30.
- Manius Servius M'. f. Marcellus, built a sepulchre at Aquileia in Venetia and Histria, dating to the last quarter of the first century BC, or the first quarter of the first century AD, for his parents, and his sister, the freedwoman Servia Eunia.
- Servia M'. l. Eunia, a freedwoman buried in a family sepulchre built by her brother, Manius Servius Marcellus, at Aquileia, in the late first century BC or early first century AD.
- Lucius Servius C. f., named in an inscription from Rome dating to the first half of the first century, along with the freedwoman Anthusa.
- Publius Servius Census, buried at Venusia in Samnium during the first half of the first century.
- Servia M'. l. Aucta, a freedwoman named in a sepulchral inscription from Aquileia, dating to the early or middle first century, together with Servius Hilarus.
- Servius Hilarus, named in a sepulchral inscription from Aquileia, dating to the early or middle first century, together with Servia Aucta.
- Numerius Servius, named in a first-century inscription found at the present site of Tobarra, formerly part of Hispania Citerior.
- Servia P. l. Crysario, a freedwoman at Venusia, probably the wife of Publius Servius Philadelphus, and possibly the mother of Publius Servius Philargurus, named in a first-century inscription as her heir.
- Servia M. l. Marmoris, a freedwoman named in a sepulchral inscription from Luceria in Apulia.
- Publius Servius St. l. Philadelphus, a freedman at Venusia during the first century, probably the husband of Servia Crysario, and perhaps the father of Publius Servius Philargurus, named as his heir.
- Publius Servius P. l. Philargurus, a freedman at Venusia during the first century, named as the heir of Publius Servius Philadelphus and Servia Crysario, possibly his parents.
- Manius Servius Primigenius, buried at Aquileia, in a first-century tomb dedicated by his mother, Servia Secunda.
- Servia Secunda, dedicated a first century tomb at Aquileia to her son, Manius Servius Primigenius.
- Marcus Servius M. f. Copystor, named in an inscription from Pompeii in Campania.
- Marcus Servius Diadumenus, one of several sacerdotes, or priests, named in a first- or second-century inscription from Aquileia.
- Lucius Servius Hospitalis, buried in a first- or second-century family sepulchre at Rome, along with Servia Primigenia.
- Servia Primigenia, buried in a first- or second-century family sepulchre at Rome, along with Lucius Servius Hospitalis.
- Gaius Servius Gratus, one of the heirs of Sacconia Secundilla, a woman buried at Ostia in Latium in the latter half of the second century. Severia Madoce, perhaps his sister, was the other heir.
- Servius Agilio, buried at Alma in Africa Proconsularis during the second or third century, aged eighty-five.
- Manius Servius Donatus, a potter whose wares were found at Potaissa in Dacia. He must have been active during the second or third century.
- Marcus Servius M'. l. Thall[...], a freedman, and one of the Seviri Augustales at Viminacium in Moesia Superior, where he was buried at the age of seventy, in the latter half of the second century, or the early part of the third, along with Manius Servius Silvanus.
- Manius Servius Silvanus, buried in a family sepulchre at Viminacium, in the latter half of the second century, or the early part of the third, along with Marcus Servius Thall[...].
- Titus Servius T. l. Clarus, a dissignator, or host, buried at Corduba in Hispania Baetica in the time of the Severan dynasty.
- Quintus Servius Nicetianus, named in a dedicatory inscription from Cumae in Campania, dating to AD 251.
- Servius Crescens, named in a list of soldiers stationed at Ravenna in AD 303.
- Servius Eulogianus, named in a list of soldiers stationed at Ravenna in AD 303.
- Servius Maurus Honoratus, a celebrated grammarian of the late fourth and early fifth century. Whether he was actually a member of the Servia gens is uncertain, as his full nomenclature is unknown.

=== Undated Servii ===
- Servia Sex. l., a freedwoman named in an inscription from Nursia in Samnium.
- Fausta Servia, buried at Thignica in Africa Proconsularis, aged thirty.
- Gaius Servius, named in a sepulchral inscription from Rome.
- Marcus Servius, named in an inscription from Aquinum.
- Marcus Servius, along with Publius Servius, one of the former masters of the freedmen Publius Poblicius Apollonida, Gellia Materna, and Publius Poblicius Fidelis, buried in a family sepulchre at Rome.
- Publius Servius, along with Marcus Servius, one of the former masters of the freedmen Publius Poblicius Apollonida, Gellia Materna, and Publius Poblicius Fidelis.
- Lucius Servius L. l. Auctus, a freedman buried at Rome.
- Servia Canaga, buried at Thugga in Africa Proconsularis.
- Servia Cervola, buried at Aquileia in a sepulchre dedicated by Caecilia Plusias.
- Servius Felicio, buried at Ostia, in a tomb dedicated by Servius Saturninus.
- Servia Firmina, a freedwoman buried at Rome.
- Lucius Servius Labeo, named in an inscription from Nemausus in Gallia Narbonensis.
- Servia Lucia, along with her brother, Quintus Saenius Urbicus, dedicated a monument at Rome to their father, Numerius Servius Rhetoricus.
- Servius Mevianus, buried at Caesaria in Mauretania Caesariensis.
- Servia L. f. Paula, buried at Thelepte in Africa Proconsularis, aged fourteen.
- Numerius Servius Rhetoricus, buried at Rome, with a monument dedicated by his children, Quintus Saenius Urbicus and Servia Lucia.
- Servius Secundus, named in an inscription found at Sassari, formerly part of Sardinia and Corsica.
- Gaius Servius Rufus Terentianus, named as proconsul in an inscription from Ilipa in Hispania Baetica.
- Servius Saturninus, dedicated a tomb at Ostia to Servius Felicio.
- Lucius Servius Secundus, made an offering to the local deity at the present site of Naraval, in Hispania Citerior.
- Sextus Servius Verus, a haruspex at Thugga in Africa proconsularis.
- Servius Victor, named in an inscription from Lambaesis in Numidia.

== See also ==
- List of Roman gentes

== Bibliography ==
- Marcus Tullius Cicero, Epistulae ad Familiares, Epistulae ad Quintum Fratrem.
- Dictionary of Greek and Roman Biography and Mythology, William Smith, ed., Little, Brown and Company, Boston (1849).
- Theodor Mommsen et alii, Corpus Inscriptionum Latinarum (The Body of Latin Inscriptions, abbreviated CIL), Berlin-Brandenburgische Akademie der Wissenschaften (1853–present).
- René Cagnat et alii, L'Année épigraphique (The Year in Epigraphy, abbreviated AE), Presses Universitaires de France (1888–present).
- George Davis Chase, "The Origin of Roman Praenomina", in Harvard Studies in Classical Philology, vol. VIII, pp. 103–184 (1897).
- T. Robert S. Broughton, The Magistrates of the Roman Republic, American Philological Association (1952–1986).
- Francisco Diego Santos, Epigrafía Romana de Asturias (Roman Epigraphy of Asturias), Oviedo (1959).
- Michael Crawford, Roman Republican Coinage, Cambridge University Press (1974, 2001).
- Hispania Epigraphica (Epigraphy of Spain), Madrid (1989–present).
