= AD 66 =

AD 66 in various calendars
- Gregorian calendar: AD 66; LXVI
- Ab urbe condita: 819
- Assyrian calendar: 4816
- Balinese saka calendar: N/A
- Bengali calendar: −528 – −527
- Berber calendar: 1016
- Buddhist calendar: 610
- Burmese calendar: −572
- Byzantine calendar: 5574–5575
- Chinese calendar: 乙丑年 (Wood Ox); 2763 or 2556 — to — 丙寅年 (Fire Tiger); 2764 or 2557
- Coptic calendar: −218 – −217
- Discordian calendar: 1232
- Ethiopian calendar: 58–59
- Hebrew calendar: 3826–3827
- Hindu calendars
- Vikram Samvat: 122–123
- Shaka Samvat: N/A
- Kali Yuga: 3166–3167
- Holocene calendar: 10066
- Iranian calendar: 556 BP – 555 BP
- Islamic calendar: 573 BH – 572 BH
- Javanese calendar: N/A
- Julian calendar: AD 66; LXVI
- Korean calendar: 2399
- Minguo calendar: 1846 before ROC 民前1846年
- Nanakshahi calendar: −1402
- Seleucid era: 377/378 AG
- Thai solar calendar: 608–609
- Tibetan calendar: ཤིང་མོ་གླང་ལོ་ (female Wood-Ox); 192 or −189 or −961 — to — མེ་ཕོ་སྟག་ལོ་ (male Fire-Tiger); 193 or −188 or −960

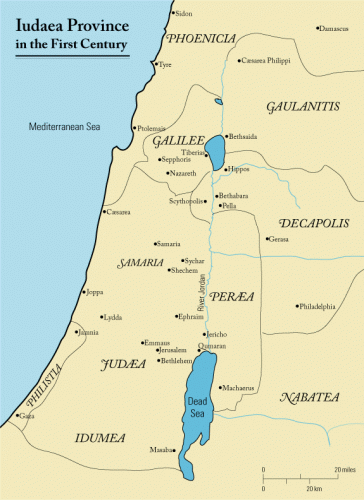
The Jewish Revolt (66–73 AD)

AD 66 (LXVI) was a common year starting on Wednesday of the Julian calendar. At the time, it was known as the Year of the Consulship of Telesinus and Paullinus (or, less frequently, year 819 Ab urbe condita). The denomination AD 66 for this year has been used since the early medieval period, when the Anno Domini calendar era became the prevalent method in Europe for naming years.

== Events ==
=== By place ===
==== Roman Empire ====
- September 22 – Emperor Nero creates the Legio I Italica. He appoints Titus Flavius Vespasian as General of the army of Judea, and Governor of Judea which gives him command of three legions – V Macedonica, X Fretensis and XV Apollinaris.
- October – The Jewish Revolt commences against the Roman Empire. The Zealots lay siege to Jerusalem and annihilate the Roman garrison (a cohort of Legio III Cyrenaica). The Sicarii capture the fortress of Masada overlooking the Dead Sea.
- Mid–late October – Cestius Gallus, legate of Syria, marches into Judea and leads a Roman army of 30,000 men to put down the Jewish rebellion. At its core is Legio XII Fulminata, plus 2,000 selected men from the other three Syrian legions, six more cohorts of infantry and four alae of cavalry, plus over 14,000 auxiliaries furnished by Rome's eastern allies, including Herod Agrippa II and two other client kings, Antiochus IV of Commagene and Sohaemus of Emesa, who lead their forces (largely archers and cavalry) in person.
- Gallus leads his main force down the coast from Caesarea via Antipatris to Lydda, detaching other units, by land and sea, to neutralize the rebel strongholds at Joppa, Narbata and the Tower of Aphek. With Galilee and the entire Judean coast in his hands, Gallus assumes his campaign before the winter rains render the roads impassable. He turns inland and marches on Jerusalem, taking the road via the plain at Emmaus. Gallus succeeds in conquering Beit She'arim (the "New City") on the Bezetha Hill.
- November – Battle of Beth-Horon: Gallus abandons the siege of Jerusalem and chooses, for uncertain reasons, to withdraw west to winter quarters, where he is ambushed and defeated by Judean rebels. Some 5,300 Roman troops are killed, as well as all their pack animals, their artillery (which is to serve the Jews of Jerusalem during Titus's siege operations four years later), and the greatest disgrace of all, the eagle standard of Legio XII Fulminata. Gallus abandons his troops in disarray, fleeing to Syria.

==== Britannia ====
- Suetonius Paullinus, governor of Britannia, becomes a Roman Consul.
- The Roman Legio II Augusta is stationed at Gloucester.

==== Asia ====
- Baekje invades Silla in the Korean Peninsula, and captures Castle Ugok.

=== By topic ===
==== Arts and sciences ====
- Dioscorides writes his De Materia Medica, a treatise on the methodical treatment of disease by use of medicine (approximate date).

==== Astronomy ====
- Halley's Comet is visible.

==== Religion ====
- The first and second Epistles to Timothy are written (speculative date, if actually written by St. Paul).
- Paul in Asia Minor for second time after his release from Rome. Then probably goes to Greece. Second imprisonment in Rome.

== Deaths ==
- Claudia Antonia, daughter of Claudius (b. AD 30)
- Gaius Anicius Cerialis, Roman suffect consul
- Gaius Petronius Arbiter, Roman politician (b. AD 27)
- Lucius Annius Vinicianus, Roman politician (b. AD 36)
- Marcia Servilia Sorana, Roman noblewoman
- Rufrius Crispinus, Roman praetorian prefect
