= Arruntia gens =

Family in ancient Rome

The gens Arruntia was a plebeian family at ancient Rome. Members of this gens first came to prominence during the final years of the Republic.

== Origin ==
The nomen Arruntius is a patronymic surname, based on the Etruscan praenomen Arruns.

== Praenomina ==
The chief praenomina of the Arruntii were Lucius and Marcus. Besides these, there are only a few examples of other names used by members of this gens, including Gaius and Quintus.

== Branches and cognomina ==
The historian Ronald Syme identified three distinct families of the Arruntii: the first descended from the admiral Lucius Arruntius, and ended with Arruntius Camillus Scribonianus; another originated at Patavium; the third came from Lycia, whence they were descended from a certain Arruntius who settled in the east during the early years of the Roman Empire.

== Members ==
This list includes abbreviated praenomina. For an explanation of this practice, see filiation.

- Arruntius, was among those proscribed by the triumvirs, along with his son. He was killed in 43 BC, but his son escaped, only to die at sea. Upon learning of her son's death, Arruntius' wife starved herself to death.
- Lucius Arruntius L. f. L. n., survived the proscription of the triumvirs, and was subsequently restored to favour. At the Battle of Actium, in 31 BC, he commanded the center of Octavian's fleet. He was consul in 22 BC.
- Gaius Arruntius, served as tribune of the plebs, and twice as propraetor, toward the end of the first century BC, or the beginning of the first century AD.
- Arruntius Aquila, governor of Galatia in 6 BC.
- Lucius Arruntius L. f. L. n., consul in AD 6, was praised by Augustus before the emperor's death, which caused Tiberius to view Arruntius with deep suspicion. He was twice accused as the result of jealousy, and on the second occasion took his own life, rather than place his trust in the justice of Caligula, who was about to become emperor.
- Lucius Arruntius L. f. L. n. Camillus Scribonianus, (Note: Scribonianus was the natural son of Marcus Furius Camillus, consul in AD 8, but was adopted by Lucius Arruntius, the consul of AD 6. He frequently appears under variations of his birth name, Marcus Furius Camillus Scribonianus.) consul in AD 32, and afterward governor of Dalmatia. Together with the senator Lucius Annius Vinicianus, he revolted against Claudius in AD 42; but his rebellion swiftly disintegrated, and he put an end to himself.
- Marcus Arruntius Aquila, the father of Marcus Arruntius Aquila, consul in AD 66.
- Paullus Arruntius, one of the companions of Caligula on the day of his assassination in AD 41.
- Arruntius Euaristus, a public crier of the Roman marketplace, who helped the tribunes of the plebs announce the death of Caligula, and by exhorting the emperor's German guards to lay down their weapons, averted a general massacre.
- Arruntius, a physician at Rome, who probably lived in the early or middle first century. Pliny the Elder related that he earned 250,000 sestertii per year. (Note: Writing in the Dictionary of Greek and Roman Biography and Mythology in 1849, Professor William A. Greenhill, M.D., of Trinity College, Oxford, described this sum as the equivalent of about £1,953 2/6, or £182,700 in 2017.)
- Lucius Arruntius L. f. L. n. Camillus Scribonianus, (Note: Like his father, he is sometimes referred to as Marcus Furius Camillus Scribonianus.) son of the elder Scribonianus, was an augur, and praefectus urbi during the reign of Claudius, but in AD 52 was exiled, along with his mother, Vibidia, after they were accused of consulting astrologers concerning the date of the emperor's death. When he died soon afterward, it was rumoured that he had been poisoned.
- Arruntia L. f. L. n. Camilla, daughter of the elder Scribonianus, is known from inscriptions.
- Arruntius, a legacy hunter mentioned by the younger Seneca.
- Arruntius Stella, appointed by Nero to oversee the production of the games that he held in AD 55.
- Marcus Arruntius M. f. Aquila, procurator of Pamphylia in AD 50, and consul suffectus ex Kal. Sept. in 66.
- Marcus Arruntius M. f. M. n. Aquila, consul suffectus in AD 77.
- Lucius Arruntius Maximus, procurator of Asturia and Gallaecia in AD 79.
- Lucius Arruntius Sempronianus Asclepiades, physician to the emperor Domitian, was perhaps related to the earlier physician Arruntius, but precisely how is uncertain.
- Marcus Arruntius Claudianus, a resident of Xanthus, was adlected into the senate under Domitian, becoming the first Lycian senator.
- Lucius Arruntius Stella, consul suffectus in AD 101, was an intimate friend of the poet Publius Papinius Statius, who wrote a poem commemorating the marriage of Arruntius and Violantilla, and dedicated the first book of his Silvae to Arruntius.
- Quintus Arruntius Q. f. Justus, had been aedile and quaestor, and was patron of a number of colonies and municipii, including Bovianum Undecimanorum, and several settlements the location of which are unknown. He must have lived in the early part of the second century.
- Arruntius Silo, mentioned in the Digest.
- Lucius Arruntius, consul in an uncertain year, toward the end of the second century AD.
- Arruntius Marcellus, a senator, mentioned by Porphyrius among the disciples of Plotinus.
- Arruntius Celsus, the author of a commentary on Terence. He probably lived in the latter part of the fourth century.

== See also ==
- List of Roman gentes

== Bibliography ==
- Marcus Velleius Paterculus, Compendium of Roman History.
- Gaius Plinius Secundus (Pliny the Elder), Naturalis Historia (Natural History).
- Lucius Annaeus Seneca (Seneca the Younger), De Beneficiis (On Kindness).
- Publius Papinius Statius, Silvae
- Flavius Josephus, Antiquitates Judaïcae (Antiquities of the Jews).
- Marcus Valerius Martialis (Martial), Epigrammata (Epigrams).
- Publius Cornelius Tacitus, Annales, Historiae.
- Appianus Alexandrinus (Appian), Bellum Civile (The Civil War).
- Lucius Cassius Dio Cocceianus (Cassius Dio), Roman History.
- Porphyrius, Vita Plotini (The Life of Plotinus).
- Digesta, or Pandectae (The Digest).
- Ludwig Schopen, De Terentio et Donato eius Interprete Dissertatio Critica (On Terence and Donato, his Interpreter: a Critical Dissertation), C. vom Bruck, Bonn (1821).
- Dictionary of Greek and Roman Biography and Mythology, William Smith, ed., Little, Brown and Company, Boston (1849).
- Theodor Mommsen et alii, Corpus Inscriptionum Latinarum (The Body of Latin Inscriptions, abbreviated CIL), Berlin-Brandenburgische Akademie der Wissenschaften (1853–present).
- George Davis Chase, "The Origin of Roman Praenomina", in Harvard Studies in Classical Philology, vol. VIII (1897).
- Paul von Rohden, Elimar Klebs, & Hermann Dessau, Prosopographia Imperii Romani (The Prosopography of the Roman Empire, abbreviated PIR), Berlin (1898).
- Henri Schuermans, "Age de la Colonne Itinéraire de Tongres", in Bulletin de la Société Scientifique et Littéraire du Limbourg, vol. XIX, pp. 65–94 (1901).
- Christian Habicht, "Zwei römische Senatoren aus Kleinasien", in Zeitschrift für Papyrologie und Epigraphik, vol. 13 (1974).
- Paul A. Gallivan, "Some Comments on the Fasti for the Reign of Nero", in Classical Quarterly, vol. 24, pp. 290–311 (1974); "The Fasti for A.D. 70–96", in Classical Quarterly, vol. 31, pp. 186–220 (1981).
- Ronald Syme, "Eight Consuls from Patavium", in Papers of the British School at Rome, vol. 51 (1983).
