= 1866 =

1866 in various calendars
- Gregorian calendar: 1866; MDCCCLXVI
- Ab urbe condita: 2619
- Armenian calendar: 1315; ԹՎ ՌՅԺԵ
- Assyrian calendar: 6616
- Baháʼí calendar: 22–23
- Balinese saka calendar: 1787–1788
- Bengali calendar: 1272–1273
- Berber calendar: 2816
- British Regnal year: 29 Vict. 1 – 30 Vict. 1
- Buddhist calendar: 2410
- Burmese calendar: 1228
- Byzantine calendar: 7374–7375
- Chinese calendar: 乙丑年 (Wood Ox); 4563 or 4356 — to — 丙寅年 (Fire Tiger); 4564 or 4357
- Coptic calendar: 1582–1583
- Discordian calendar: 3032
- Ethiopian calendar: 1858–1859
- Hebrew calendar: 5626–5627
- Hindu calendars
- Vikram Samvat: 1922–1923
- Shaka Samvat: 1787–1788
- Kali Yuga: 4966–4967
- Holocene calendar: 11866
- Igbo calendar: 866–867
- Iranian calendar: 1244–1245
- Islamic calendar: 1282–1283
- Japanese calendar: Keiō 2 (慶応２年)
- Javanese calendar: 1794–1795
- Julian calendar: Gregorian minus 12 days
- Korean calendar: 4199
- Minguo calendar: 46 before ROC 民前46年
- Nanakshahi calendar: 398
- Thai solar calendar: 2408–2409
- Tibetan calendar: ཤིང་མོ་གླང་ལོ་ (female Wood-Ox); 1992 or 1611 or 839 — to — མེ་ཕོ་སྟག་ལོ་ (male Fire-Tiger); 1993 or 1612 or 840

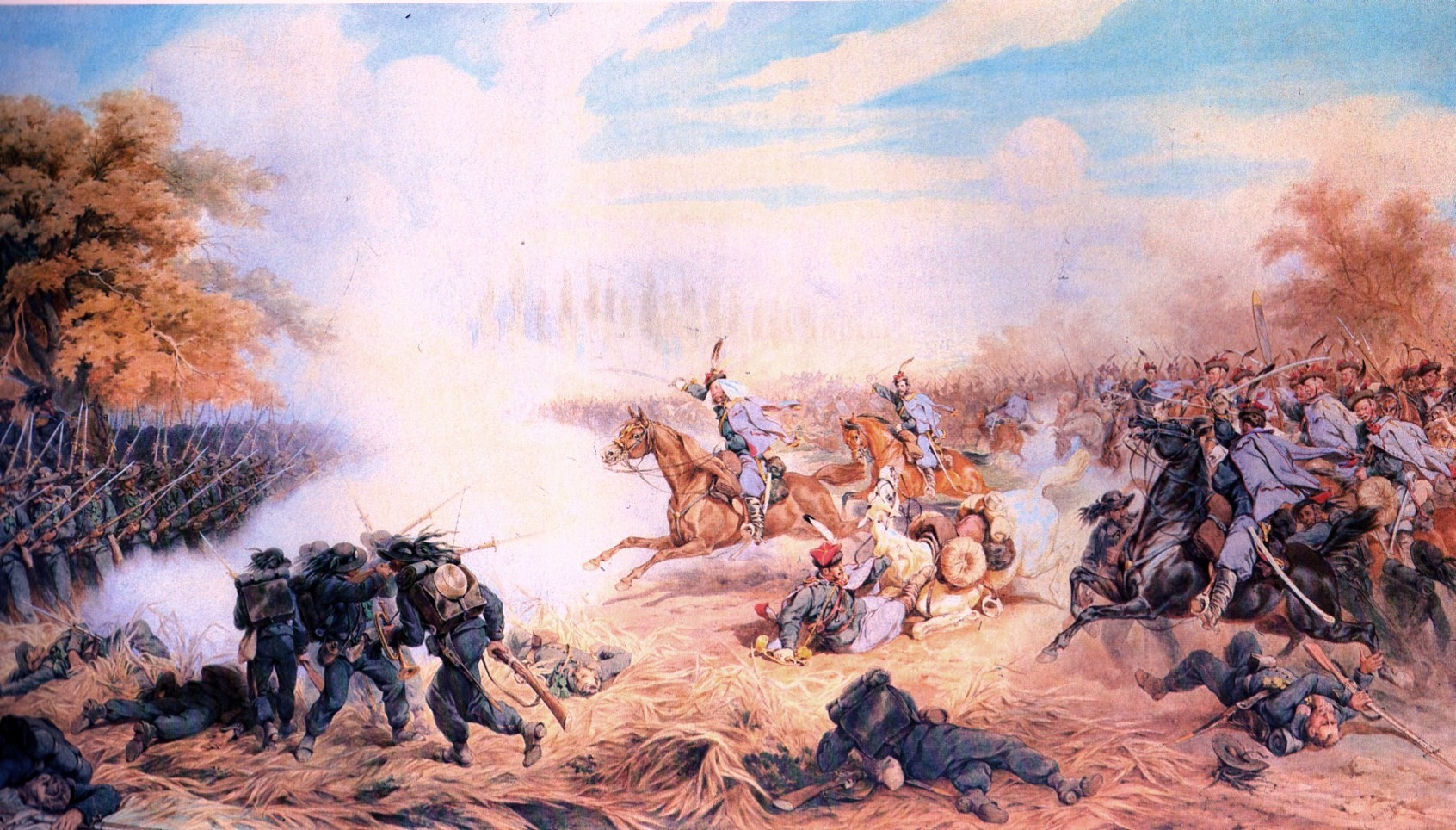
June 20: Start of the Third Italian War of Independence

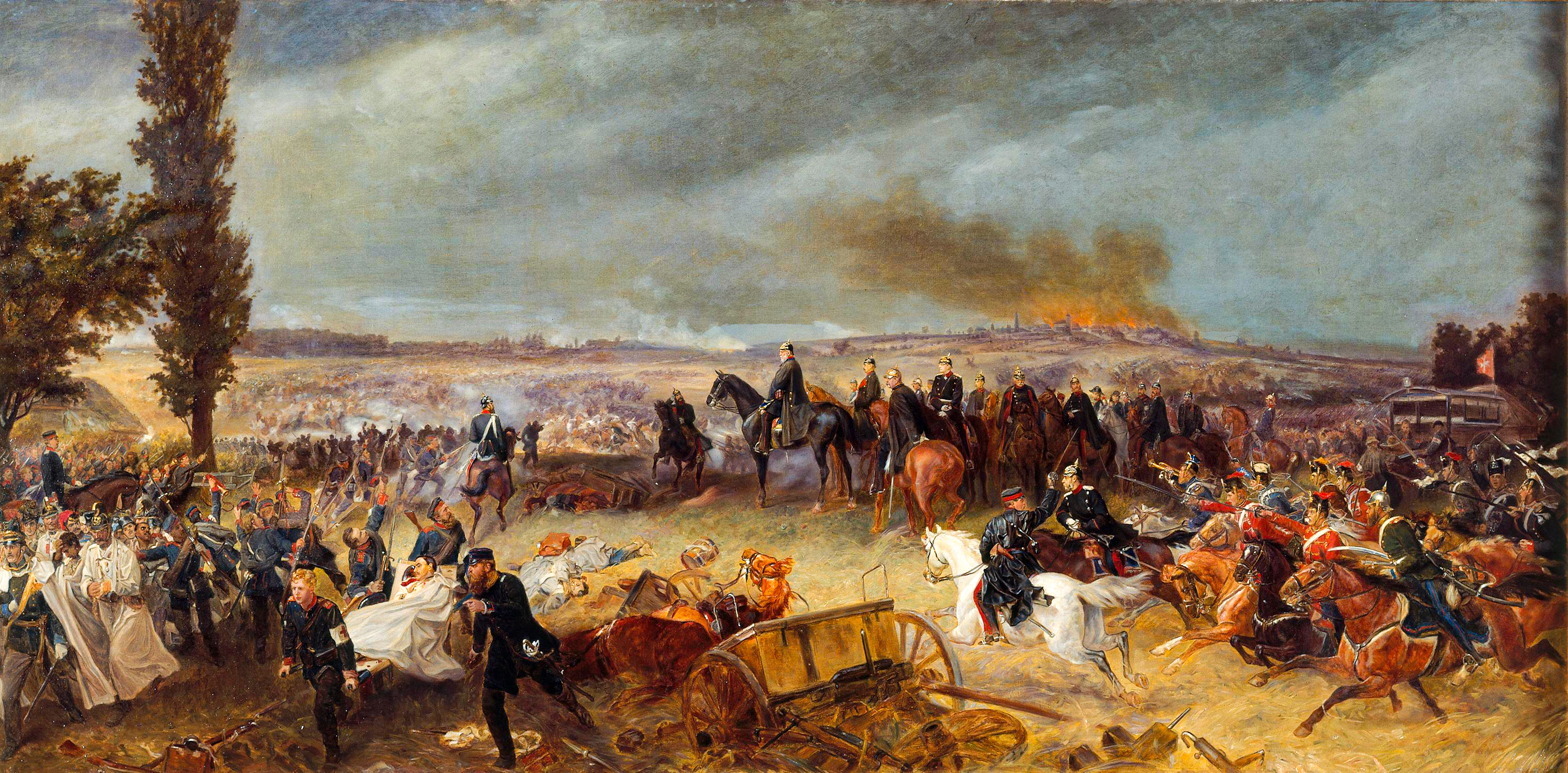
July 3: Battle of Königgrätz

1866 (MDCCCLXVI) was a common year starting on Monday of the Gregorian calendar and a common year starting on Saturday of the Julian calendar, the 1866th year of the Common Era (CE) and Anno Domini (AD) designations, the 866th year of the 2nd millennium, the 66th year of the 19th century, and the 7th year of the 1860s decade. As of the start of 1866, the Gregorian calendar was 12 days ahead of the Julian calendar, which remained in localized use until 1923.

== Events ==
=== January ===
- January 1
  - Fisk University, a historically black university, is established in Nashville, Tennessee.
  - The last issue of the abolitionist magazine The Liberator is published.
- January 6 – Ottoman troops clash with supporters of Maronite leader Youssef Bey Karam, at St. Doumit in Lebanon; the Ottomans are defeated.
- January 12
  - The Royal Aeronautical Society is formed as The Aeronautical Society of Great Britain in London, the world's oldest such society.
  - British auxiliary steamer SS London (1864) sinks in a storm in the Bay of Biscay, on passage from the Thames to Australia, with the loss of 244 people, and only 19 survivors.
- January 18 – Wesley College, Melbourne, is established.
- January 26 – Volcanic eruption in the Santorini caldera begins.

=== February ===
- February 7 – Battle of Abtao: A Spanish naval squadron fights a combined Peruvian-Chilean fleet, at the island of Abtao, in the Chiloé Archipelago of southern Chile.
- February 13 – The first daylight bank robbery in United States history during peacetime takes place in Liberty, Missouri. This is considered to be the first robbery committed by Jesse James and his gang, although James's role is disputed.
- February 26 – The Calaveras Skull is discovered in California. Purported to be evidence of humans in North America during the Pliocene epoch, it turns out to be a hoax.

=== March ===
- March 13 – The United States Congress overwhelmingly passes the Civil Rights Act of 1866, the first federal legislation to protect the rights of African-Americans; U.S. President Andrew Johnson vetoes the bill on March 27, and Congress overrides the veto on April 9.
- March 31 – A total lunar eclipse occurs.

=== April ===
- April 4 – Alexander II of Russia narrowly escapes an assassination attempt in the city of St Petersburg.
- April 8 – The kingdoms of Italy and Prussia form an alliance against the Austrian Empire.
- April 10 – The American Society for the Prevention of Cruelty to Animals (ASPCA) is founded in New York City by Henry Bergh.

=== May ===
- May 1–3 – The Memphis massacre: a rebellion with a series of violent racial events.
- May 2 – Battle of Callao: Peruvian defenders fight the Spanish fleet.
- May 7 – Student Ferdinand Cohen-Blind makes a failed attempt to assassinate Otto von Bismarck in Unter den Linden in Berlin.
- May 10 – London bank Overend, Gurney and Company collapses, precipitating Panic of 1866.
- May 16 – The United States Congress approves the minting of a nickel 5-cent coin (nickel), eliminating its predecessor, the half dime.

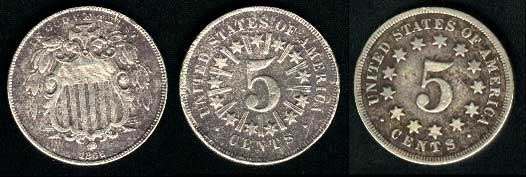
May 16: U.S. nickel coin approved.

- May 24 – Battle of Tuyutí: 32,000 soldiers of the Triple Alliance defeat 24,000 Paraguayan soldiers few miles north of the Paraná, Argentina, in the Paraguayan War, with 16,000 casualties.
- May 26 – First production of the comic opera Cox and Box by F. C. Burnand and Arthur Sullivan at Moray Lodge, Kensington
- May 30 – Bedrich Smetana's comic opera The Bartered Bride premiered in Prague.

=== June ===
- June 2 – Fenian forces skirmish with Canadian militia at the battles of Ridgeway and Fort Erie.
- June 4 - the 1866–67 United States House of Representatives elections start, continuing through September 6, 1867.
- June 5 – Calculations indicate Pluto (not known at this time) reaches its only aphelion (furthest point from the Sun) between 1618 and August 2113.
- June 8 – The Parliament of Canada meets for the first time in Ottawa.
- June 11 – The Agra High Court is established (later shifted to the Allahabad High Court).
- June 14 – The Austro-Prussian War ("Seven Weeks War") begins when the Austrians and most of the medium-size German states declare war on Prussia.
- June 20 – The Kingdom of Italy declares war on Austria.
- June 22 – In Sweden, the Riksdag of the Estates votes to replace itself by an elected two-chamber Riksdag.
- June 27–29 – Battle of Langensalza: The Prussians defeat the Hanoverian army.

=== July ===
- July 3 – Battle of Königgrätz: the Prussian army under King Wilhelm and Helmuth von Moltke defeats the Austrian army of Ludwig von Benedek, leading to a decisive Prussian victory in the Austro-Prussian War.
- July 5 – Princess Helena, third daughter of Queen Victoria, marries Prince Christian of Schleswig-Holstein.
- July 10 – Reconstruction Treaty with Choctaw & Chickasaw, completing the abolition of slavery in the United States; see also Choctaw freedmen.
- July 13 (July 1 Old Style) – The first Constitution of Romania is issued.
- July 20 – Austro-Prussian War: Naval Battle of Lissa – The Austrian fleet under Wilhelm von Tegetthoff defeats the Italian fleet of Carlo di Persano.
- July 22 – Austro-Prussian War: Battle of Blumenau – Austrians defend Bratislava against the Prussian army, concluding the fighting in the war.
- July 24 – Reconstruction: Tennessee becomes the first U.S. state to be readmitted to the Union following the American Civil War.
- July 25 – The United States Congress passes legislation authorizing the four-star rank of General of the Army (later reestablished as a five-star rank); Lieutenant General Ulysses S. Grant becomes the first to have this rank.

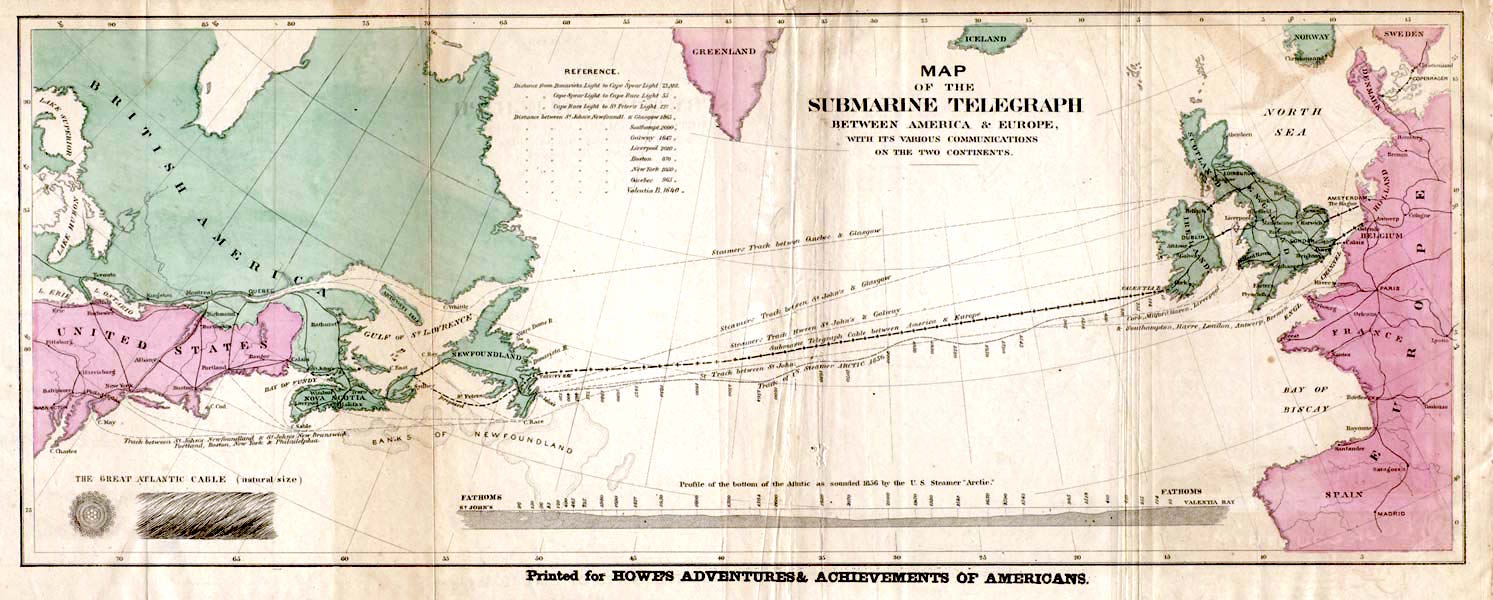
July 27: Atlantic Cable completed

- July 27 – The SS Great Eastern successfully completes laying the transatlantic telegraph cable between Valentia Island, Ireland, and Heart's Content, Newfoundland, permanently restoring a communications link.
- July 28 – The Metric Act of 1866 becomes law and legalizes the standardization of weights and measures in the United States.

=== August ===
- August 23 – The Treaty of Prague formally ends the Austro-Prussian War. The German Federation is abolished (with the Duchy of Limburg and Luxemburg controlled by the Netherlands), the Habsburgs vow not to interfere in any reorganisation of Germany under Prussian leadership and cede Veneto.
- August 27 - United States President Andrew Johnson starts a speaking campaign, which lasts until September 15.

=== September ===
- September 20 – The Kingdom of Prussia formally annexes the Kingdom of Hanover and King George V of Hanover goes into exile.
- September 22 – Paraguay successfully defends Curupayty against the Triple Alliance in the Paraguayan War, killing more than 5,000 while sustaining just about 50 casualties.
- September – The Great Tea Race of 1866 ends in London, narrowly won by the clipper ship Taeping.

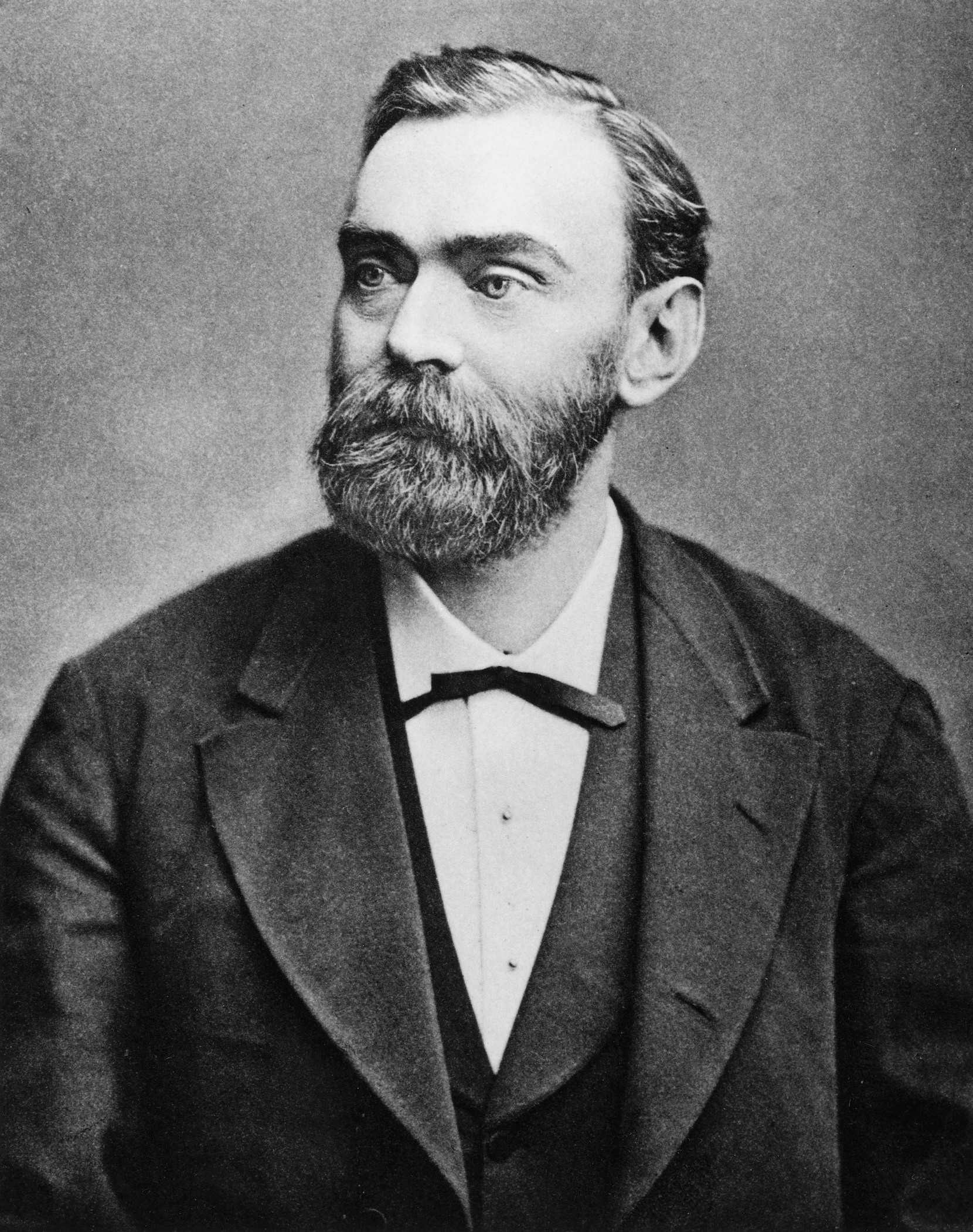
Alfred Nobel invents dynamite in 1866

=== October ===
- October 12 – The Treaty of Vienna ends the war between Austria and Italy; it formalizes the annexation of Venetia by Italy.
- October 14 – French troops under the command of Rear Admiral Pierre-Gustave Roze land at Ganghwa Island, Korea, as part of a punitive expedition against that kingdom for the execution of French Jesuit priests. It is the first military contact between Korea and a Western force.
- October 22 – The office of State President of the South African Republic is created by constitutional amendment approved at a session of the Volksraad.
- October 27 - Thomas Nast publishes one of his best known cartoons, Andy's Trip, a satire of President Andrew Johnson and his Swing Around the Circle.

=== November ===
- November 7 – The Ruse–Varna railway line (the first railway in Bulgaria) officially opens.

=== December ===
- December 12– Oaks explosion: The worst mining disaster in England kills 383 miners and rescuers.
- December 18 – The College of Wooster is founded in Ohio.

=== Date unknown ===
- Federalist revolts occur in Argentina.
- Alfred Nobel invents dynamite in Germany.
- Foundation of the predecessors of Nestlé S.A., the Anglo-Swiss Milk Company and Farine Lactée Henri Nestlé.
- The Minneapolis Milling Company, predecessor of General Mills, builds its own mills.
- Marcus Jastrow arrives in the United States to become rabbi of Congregation Rodeph Shalom in Philadelphia.
- The recommendations of the state Girls' School Committee of 1866 result in a series of progressive reforms in women's rights in Sweden.
- The Famine of 1866–68 begins in Finland.
- Erasmus Jacobs discovers the 21.25-carat (4.250 g) Eureka Diamond near Hopetown on the banks of the Orange River in the Cape of Good Hope.
- Magirus, as predecessor of a major worldwide commercial vehicles manufacturing brand, Iveco, is founded in Baden-Württemberg, Germany.

== Births ==
=== January–March ===
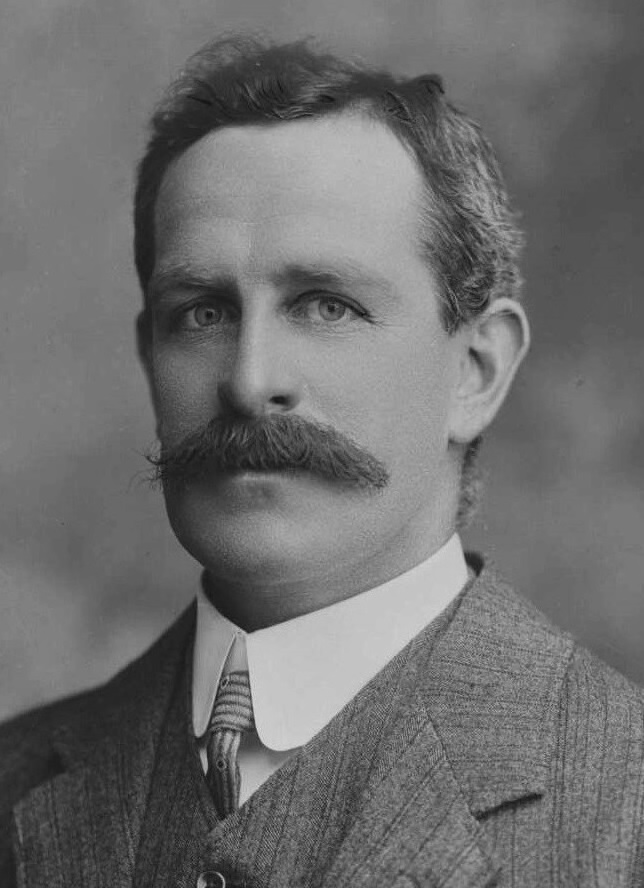
Frank Tudor

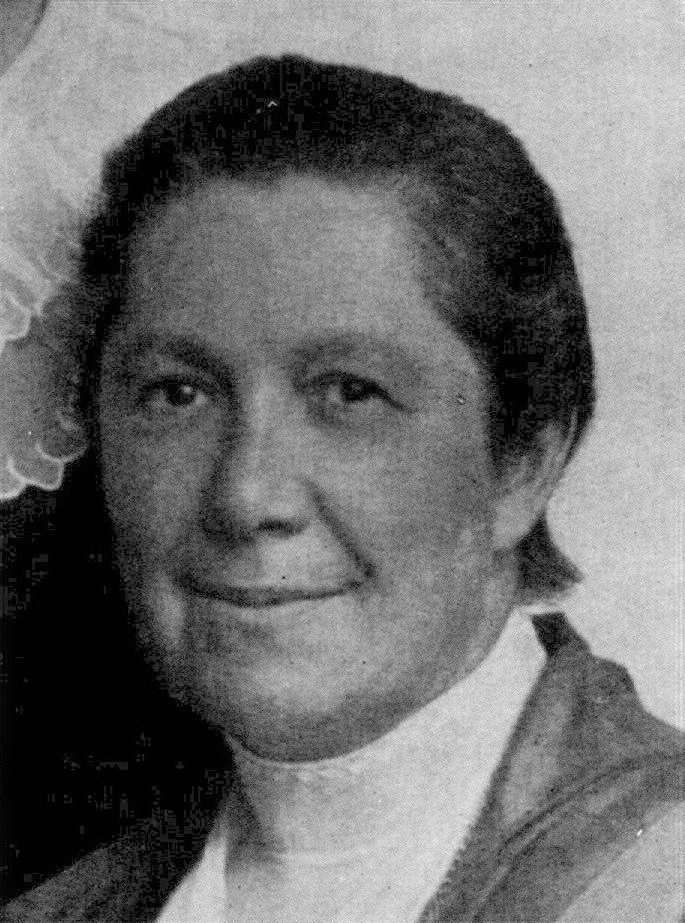
Emilia Broomé

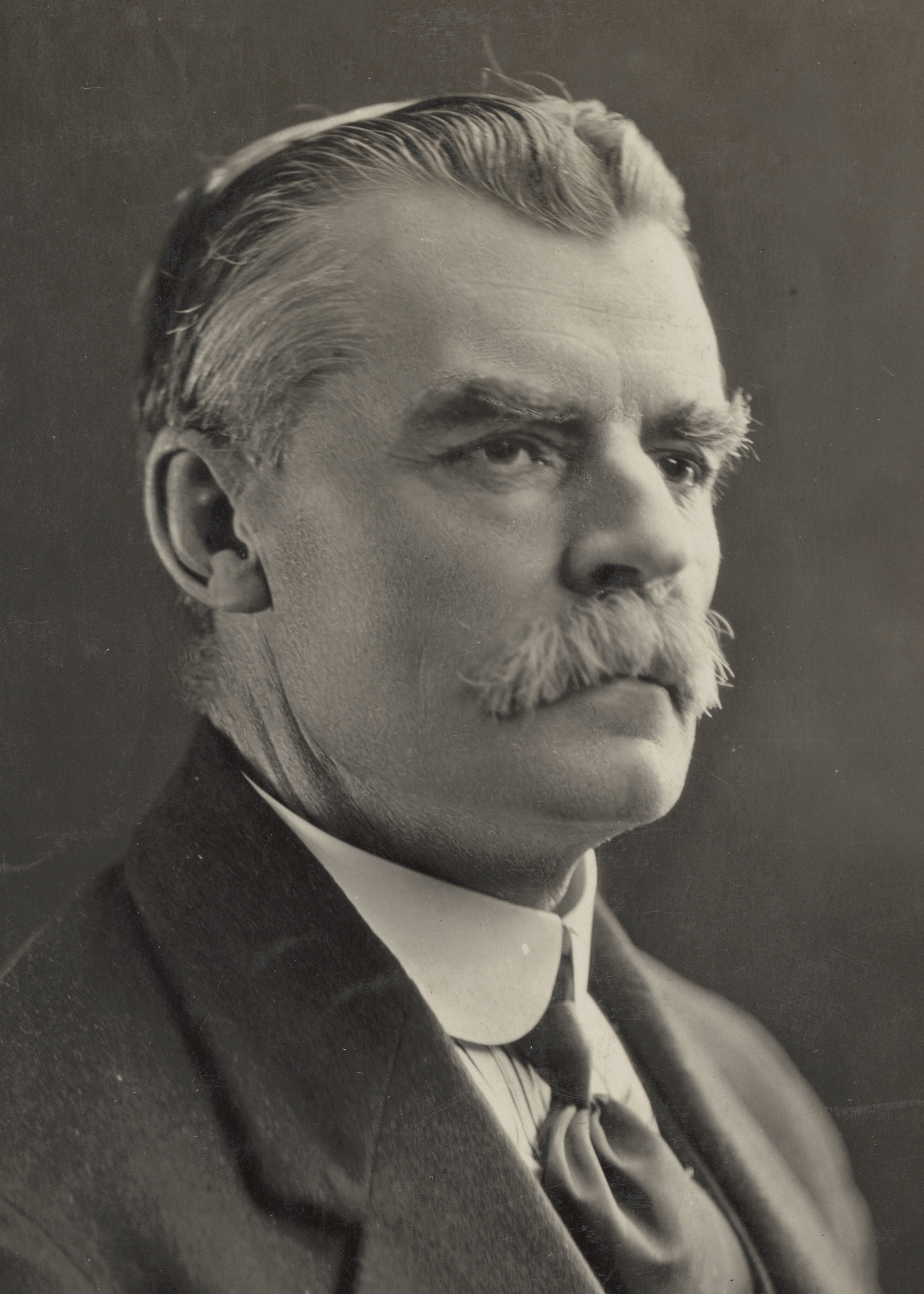
Matthew Charlton

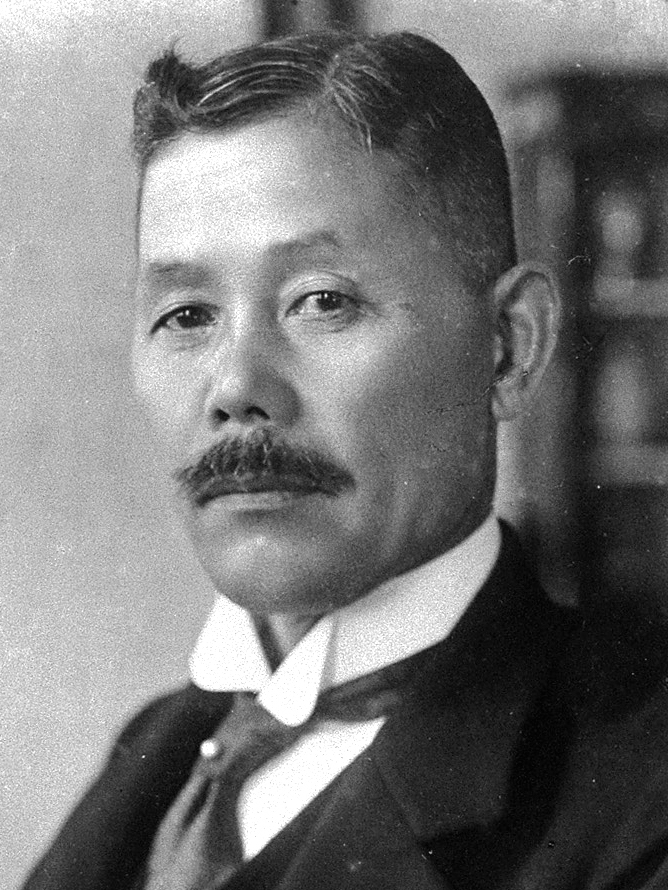
Wakatsuki Reijirō

- January 10 – Hermanus Johannes Lovink, Dutch agriculturalist and politician (d. 1938)
- January 13
  - George Gurdjieff, Russian spiritual teacher (d. 1949)
  - Vasily Kalinnikov, Russian composer (d. 1901)
- January 15
  - Nathan Söderblom, Swedish archbishop, recipient of the Nobel Peace Prize (d. 1931)
  - Horatio Dresser, American New Thought religious leader and writer (d. 1954)
- January 16 – Percy Pilcher, English inventor and pioneer aviator (d. 1899)
- January 19 – Harry Davenport, American actor (d. 1949)
- January 29
  - Romain Rolland, French writer, Nobel Prize laureate (d. 1944)
  - Frank Tudor, Australian politician (d. 1922)
- February 1 – Agda Meyerson, Swedish nurse and healthcare profession activist (d. 1924)
- February 2 – Enrique Simonet, Spanish painter (d. 1927)
- February 9 – George Ade, American writer, newspaper columnist and playwright (d. 1944)
- February 18 – Janko Vukotić, Montenegrin general (d. 1927)
- February 26 – Herbert Henry Dow, Canadian chemical industrialist (d. 1930)
- March 5 – Arthur Leopold Busch, English-born American submarine pioneer (d. 1956)
- March 7 – Hans Fruhstorfer, German lepidopterist (d. 1922)
- March 13 – Friedrich Boedicker, German admiral (d. 1944)
- March 15 – Matthew Charlton, Australian politician (d. 1948)
- March 19 – Emilio De Bono, Italian general and fascist activist (d. 1944)
- March 21
  - James Harbord, American general (d. 1947)
  - Wakatsuki Reijirō, 25th and 28th Prime Minister of Japan (d. 1949)

=== April–June ===
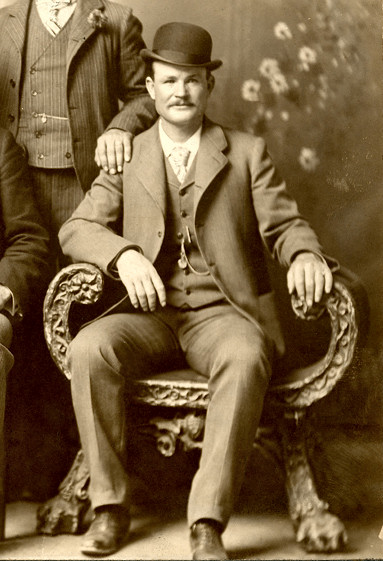
Butch Cassidy

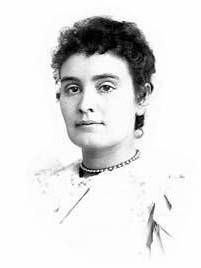
Anne Sullivan

- April 1 – Ferruccio Busoni, Italian pianist and composer (d. 1924)
- April 3 – J. B. M. Hertzog, Boer General and 3rd Prime Minister of South Africa (d. 1942)
- April 8 – Alfred Allen, American actor (d. 1947)
- April 13 – Butch Cassidy, American outlaw (k. 1908)
- April 14 – Anne Sullivan, American tutor of Helen Keller (d. 1936)
- April 17 – Ernest Starling, English physiologist (d. 1927)
- April 18 – Yamaya Tanin, Japanese admiral (d. 1940)
- April 21 – Josefa Toledo de Aguerri, Nicaraguan pioneer educator (d. 1962)
- April 22 – Hans von Seeckt, German general (d. 1936)
- April 24 – Ishii Kikujirō, Japanese diplomat (d. 1945)
- May 10 – Richard H. Jackson, American four-star admiral (d. 1971)
- May 17 – Erik Satie, French composer (d. 1925)
- May 22 – Charles F. Haanel, American New Thought author and businessman (d. 1949)
- June 4 – Miina Sillanpää, Finnish politician (d. 1952)
- June 26
  - George Herbert, 5th Earl of Carnarvon, English financier of Egyptian excavations (d. 1923)
  - Josef Swickard, German actor (d. 1940)

=== July–September ===
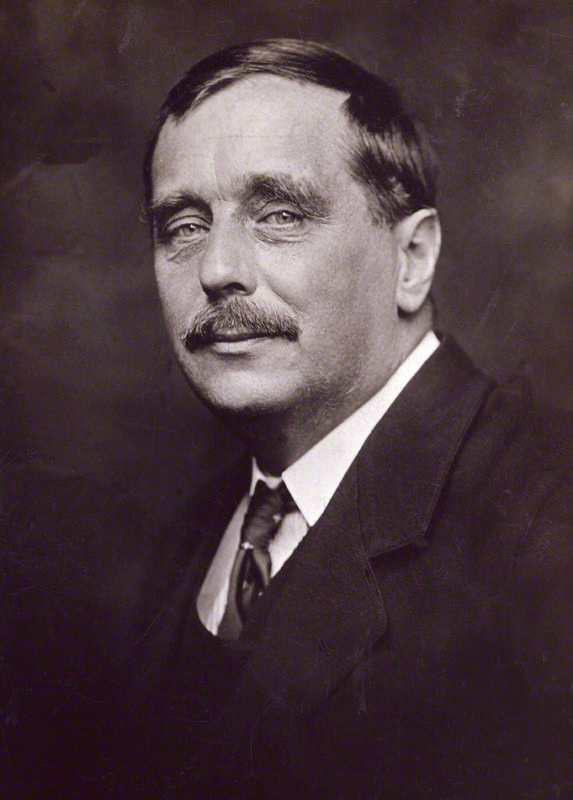
H. G. Wells

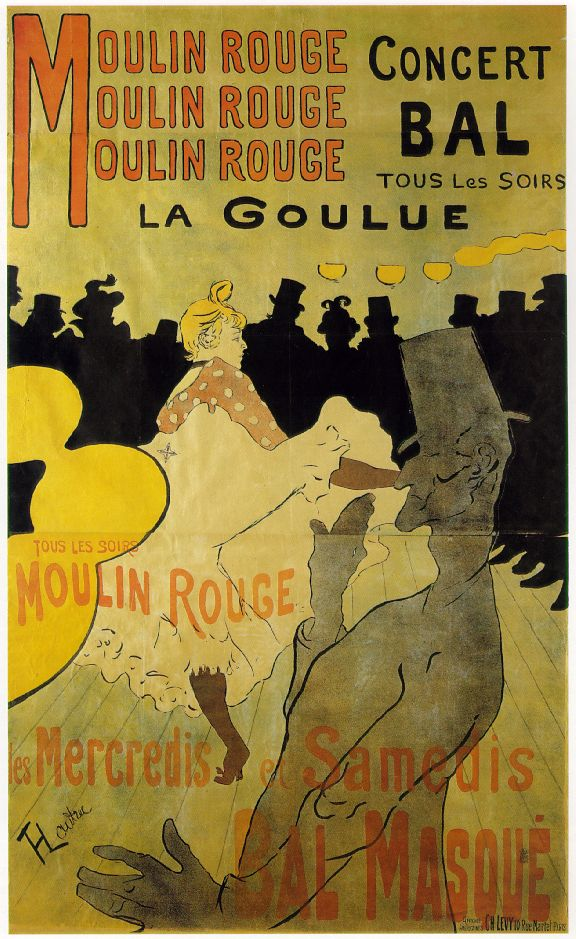
La Goulue

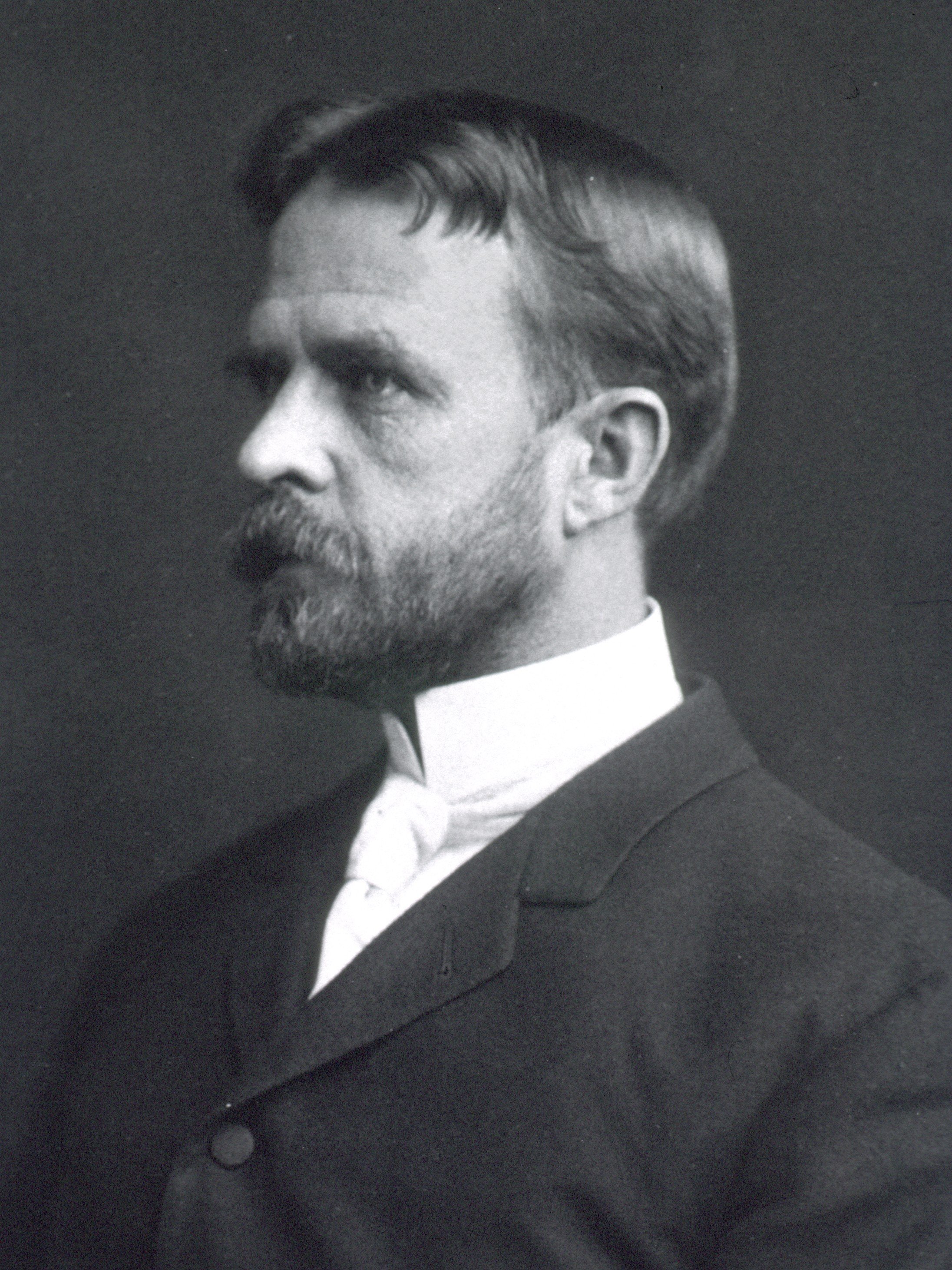
Thomas Hunt Morgan

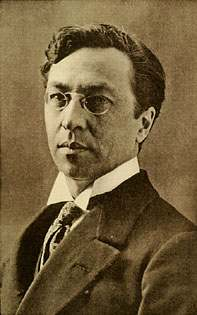
Wassily Kandinsky

- July 6 – Charles Mangin, French general (d. 1925)
- July 9 – Macklyn Arbuckle, American actor (d. 1931)
- July 13 – La Goulue, French dancer (d. 1929)
- July 25 – Frederick Blackman, English plant physiologist (d. 1947)
- July 27 – António José de Almeida, 6th President of Portugal and 64th Prime Minister of Portugal (d. 1929)
- July 28 – Beatrix Potter, English children's author (Peter Rabbit and Jemima Puddle-Duck) (d. 1943)
- August 2 – Adrien de Gerlache, Belgian naval officer and explorer (d. 1934)
- August 4 – Gheorghe Mărdărescu, Romanian general and politician (d. 1938)
- August 6 – Chief Thunderbird, Native American actor (d. 1946)
- August 8 – Matthew Henson, African-American explorer (d. 1955)
- August 12 – Jacinto Benavente, Spanish writer, Nobel Prize laureate (d. 1954)
- August 14 – Dmitry Merezhkovsky, Russian novelist, poet and religious thinker (d. 1941)
- September 1

- James J. Corbett, American boxer (d. 1933)
- Thomas F. Woodlock, editor of The Wall Street Journal and Interstate Commerce Commission commissioner (d. 1945)

- September 7 – Tristan Bernard, French writer (d. 1947)
- September 10 – Jeppe Aakjær, Danish poet and novelist (d. 1930)
- September 16 – Joe Vila, American sportswriter (d. 1934)
- September 21
  - Charles Nicolle, French bacteriologist, recipient of the Nobel Prize in Physiology or Medicine (d. 1936)
  - H. G. Wells, English writer (d. 1946)
- September 22 – Witmer Stone, American ornithologist and botanist (d. 1939)
- September 27 – Eurosia Fabris, Italian Catholic Blessed (d. 1932)
- September 25 – Thomas Hunt Morgan, American geneticist, recipient of the Nobel Prize in Physiology or Medicine (d. 1945)

=== October–December ===
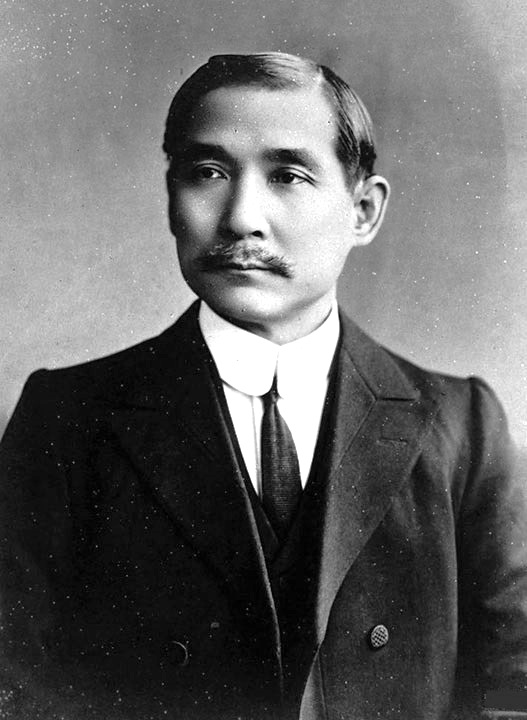
Sun Yat-sen

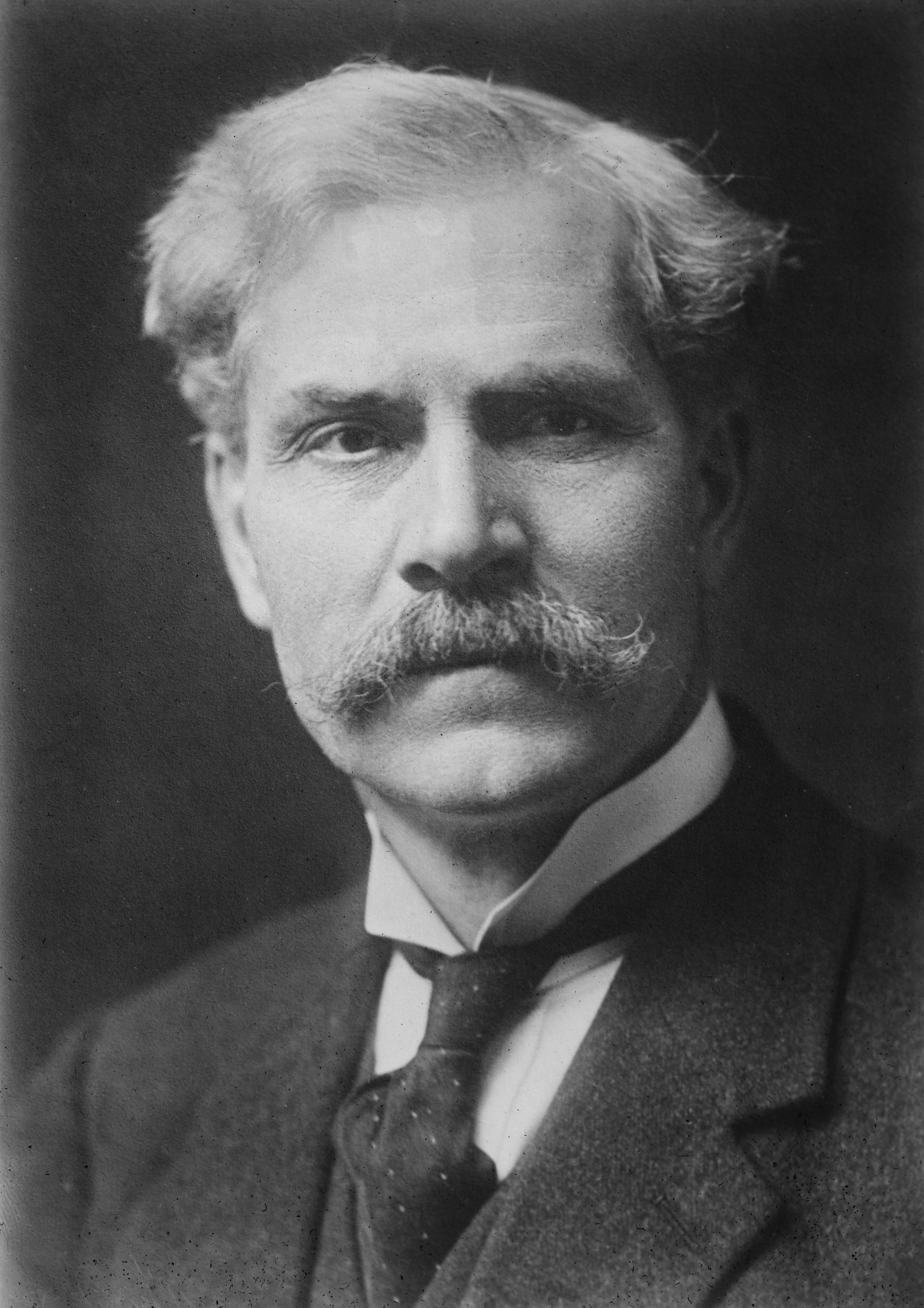
Ramsay MacDonald

- October 6
  - Reginald Fessenden, Canadian inventor (d. 1932)
  - Nina Bang, Danish politician (d. 1928)
- October 12 – Ramsay MacDonald, Scottish Prime Minister of the United Kingdom (d. 1937)
- October 29
  - Antonio Luna, Filipino general (d. 1899)
  - Dmitri Parsky, Russian general (d. 1921)
- November 3 – Paul Lincke, German composer (d. 1946)
- November 11 – Martha Annie Whiteley, English chemist and mathematician (d. 1956)
- November 12 – Sun Yat-sen, Chinese revolutionary (d. 1925)
- November 16 – Cornelia Sorabji, Indian-born lawyer (d. 1954)
- November 28
  - Sy Sanborn, American sportswriter (d. 1934)
  - David Warfield, American stage actor (d. 1951)
- November 30
  - Robert Broom, Scottish paleontologist (d. 1951)
  - Andrey Lyapchev, 22nd Prime Minister of Bulgaria (d. 1933)
- December 2 – Constantin Cristescu, Romanian general (d. 1923)
- December 11 – Ada Baker, Australian soprano, singing teacher and vaudeville star (d. 1949)
- December 12 – Alfred Werner, German chemist, Nobel Prize laureate (d. 1919)
- December 16 (December 4 O.S.) – Wassily Kandinsky, Russian-born painter (d. 1944)
- December 17 – Kazys Grinius, 5th Prime Minister of Lithuania (d. 1950)
- December 29 – Marie Cahill, American singer and actress (d. 1933)

=== Date unknown ===
- Ilia Solomonovich Abelman, Russian astronomer (d. 1898)
- William M. Dalton, American Old West outlaw (d. 1894)

== Deaths ==
=== January–June ===
- January (date unknown) – Thomas Baldwin Marsh, American religious leader (b. 1799)
- January 16 – Phineas Quimby, American physician (b. 1802)
- January 19 – Harriet Ludlow Clarke, British artist
- January 23 – Thomas Love Peacock, English satirist (b. 1785)
- January 31 – Friedrich Rückert, German poet, translator and professor of Oriental languages (b. 1788)
- February 25 – Sarah Ann Gill, Barbadian national heroine (b. 1795)
- March 4 – Alexander Campbell, Irish/U.S. founder of the Disciples of Christ (b. 1788)
- March 6 – William Whewell, English scientist, philosopher and historian of science (b. 1794)
- March 9 – Jakob Joseph Matthys, Swiss Catholic priest (b. 1802)
- March 20 – Rikard Nordraak, Norwegian composer (b. 1842)
- March 21 – Nadezhda Durova, first female Russian military officer (b. 1783)
- March 24 – Maria Amalia of Naples and Sicily, Queen of France (b. 1782)
- March 28 – Solomon Foot, American politician (b. 1802)
- March 29 – John Keble, British churchman (b. 1792)
- April 1 – Elizabeth Jesser Reid, English social reformer, founder of Bedford College (b. 1789)
- April 4 – William Dick, founder of Edinburgh Veterinary College (b. 1793)
- April 5 – Thomas Hodgkin, British physician (b. 1798)
- April 7 – Johann Sedlatzek, German flautist (b. 1789)
- April 12 – Peter Hesketh-Fleetwood, English Member of Parliament and developer (b. 1801)
- May 13 – Nikolai Brashman, Russian mathematician of Czech origin (b. 1796)
- May 29 – Winfield Scott, American general and presidential candidate (b. 1786)
- June 7 – Chief Sealth, Native American for whom Seattle is named (b. c. 1786)
- June 17 – Lewis Cass, American military officer, politician, and statesman (b. 1782)

=== July–December ===
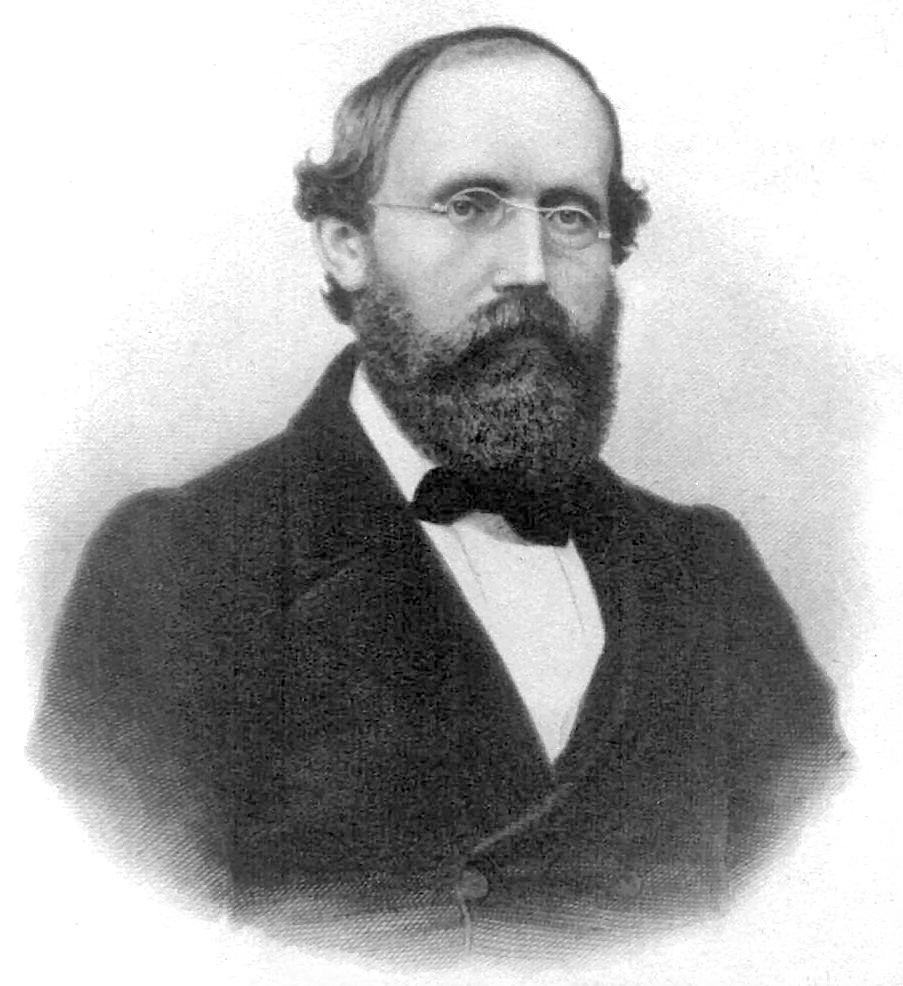
Bernhard Riemann

- July 20 – Bernhard Riemann, German mathematician (b. 1826)
- July 25 – Floride Calhoun, Second Lady of the United States (b. 1792)
- July 29 – Madame Clicquot Ponsardin, French champagne producer (b. 1777)
- August 1 – John Ross, long-serving principal chief of the Cherokee Nation, of natural causes, in Washington D. C. (born 1790 in Cherokee Nation East).
- August 6 – Christian Eric Fahlcrantz, Swedish writer (b. 1790)
- August 20 – Maria De Mattias, Italian Catholic saint (b. 1805)
- August 29 – Tokugawa Iemochi, 14th shōgun of the Tokugawa shogunate of Japan (b. 1846)
- September 4 – Theresa Pulszky, European author (b. 1819)
- September 30 – Per Gustaf Svinhufvud af Qvalstad, treasurer of Tavastia province, manor host, and paternal grandfather of President of Finland P. E. Svinhufvud (b. 1804)
- October 13 – Celadon Leeds Daboll, American merchant and inventor (b. 1818)
- October 18 – Manuel Bulnes, Chilean general and politician, President of Chile (b. 1799)
- November 11 – Agustín Jerónimo de Iturbide y Huarte, Prince Imperial of Mexico (b. 1807)
- November 14 – King Miguel I of Portugal (b. 1802)
- November 26 – Jean-Jacques Willmar, Luxembourg politician (b. 1792)
- December 1 – George Everest, Welsh geodesist (b. 1790)
- December 21 – William J. Fetterman, United States Army officer (b. 1835?)
- December 21 – Mercedes Marín del Solar, Chilean poet, reform educator (b. 1804)
- December 25 – Hayrullah Efendi, Ottoman physician, historian, and official (b. 1818)

=== Date unknown ===
- Du Bois Agett, early settler of Western Australia (b. 1796)
