= Gaius Paccius Africanus =

Roman senator and delator (informer)

Gaius Paccius Africanus was a Roman senator and delator or informer, who was active during the reigns of Nero and Vespasian. He was suffect consul from July to August 66 as the colleague of Marcus Annius Afrinus.

Steven Rutledge, in his study on delatores of this period, suggests Africanus was born in the middle of Tiberius' reign, "probably no earlier than 27". An inscription found at Terracina, possibly his tombstone, lists some local offices he held, which included serving as decemvir ad hastam (a judicial position), and sponsoring games held in honor of Honos et Virtus.

According to Tacitus, Africanus had denounced the brothers Publius Sulpicius Scribonius Proculus and Publius Sulpicius Scribonius Rufus to the emperor Nero; they were suffect consuls in 56. As Dio Cassius tells the tale, at the time both were administering Germania Inferior and Germania Superior when Nero summoned them to Achaea for some misleading reason, only to be charged under the lex maiestas, and, unable to defend themselves, both committed suicide. After the death of Nero, when the chaos of the Year of the Four Emperors had settled, Africanus was prosecuted for his role in the deaths of the brothers Sulpicii Scribonii; unable to either confess or deny the fact, he instead implicated Quintus Vibius Crispus as also involved in the matter. In the aftermath, he was physically ejected from the Curia Julia.

Despite his disreputable history, Africanus was able to remain on good enough terms with the emperor Vespasian that he was allowed to participate in the sortition and be proconsular governor of Africa for the term 77/78. He went on to be patronus municipii, most likely of Hippo Regius.

Political offices
Preceded by Gaius Luccius Telesinus, and Gaius Suetonius Paulinus (II?) as ordinary consuls	Suffect consul of the Roman Empire; 66 with Marcus Annius Afrinus	Succeeded by Marcus Arruntius Aquila, and Marcus Vettius Bolanus as suffect consuls
