= Marcus Arruntius Aquila =

Marcus Arruntius Aquila may refer to:

- Marcus Arruntius Aquila (consul 66), Roman senator
- Marcus Arruntius Aquila (consul 77), Roman senator
