= AD 67 =

AD 67 in various calendars
- Gregorian calendar: AD 67; LXVII
- Ab urbe condita: 820
- Assyrian calendar: 4817
- Balinese saka calendar: N/A
- Bengali calendar: −527 – −526
- Berber calendar: 1017
- Buddhist calendar: 611
- Burmese calendar: −571
- Byzantine calendar: 5575–5576
- Chinese calendar: 丙寅年 (Fire Tiger); 2764 or 2557 — to — 丁卯年 (Fire Rabbit); 2765 or 2558
- Coptic calendar: −217 – −216
- Discordian calendar: 1233
- Ethiopian calendar: 59–60
- Hebrew calendar: 3827–3828
- Hindu calendars
- Vikram Samvat: 123–124
- Shaka Samvat: N/A
- Kali Yuga: 3167–3168
- Holocene calendar: 10067
- Iranian calendar: 555 BP – 554 BP
- Islamic calendar: 572 BH – 571 BH
- Javanese calendar: N/A
- Julian calendar: AD 67; LXVII
- Korean calendar: 2400
- Minguo calendar: 1845 before ROC 民前1845年
- Nanakshahi calendar: −1401
- Seleucid era: 378/379 AG
- Thai solar calendar: 609–610
- Tibetan calendar: མེ་ཕོ་སྟག་ལོ་ (male Fire-Tiger); 193 or −188 or −960 — to — མེ་མོ་ཡོས་ལོ་ (female Fire-Hare); 194 or −187 or −959

AD 67 (LXVII) was a common year starting on Thursday of the Julian calendar. At the time it was known as the Year of the Consulship of Julius Rufus and Fonteius Capito (or, less frequently, year 820 Ab urbe condita). The denomination AD 67 for this year has been used since the early medieval period, when the Anno Domini calendar era became the prevalent method in Europe for naming years.

== Events ==
=== By place ===
==== Roman Empire ====
- Gaius Julius Vindex revolts, first in a series of revolts that lead to Nero's downfall.
- Gaius Licinius Mucianus replaces Gaius Cestius Gallus as governor of Syria.
- First Jewish–Roman War: Vespasian arrives in Ptolemais in Phoenicia along with the Legio X Fretensis and Legio V Macedonica, to put down the revolt.
- Vespasian is joined by his son Titus, who brings Legio XV Apollinaris from Alexandria. By late spring the Roman army numbers more than 60,000 soldiers, including auxilia and troops of King Herod Agrippa II.
- Jewish leaders at Jerusalem are divided through a power struggle, and a brutal civil war erupts. The Zealots and the Sicarii execute anyone who tries to leave the city.
- Siege of Yodfat: Its 40,000 Jewish inhabitants are massacred. The historian Josephus, leader of the rebels in Galilee, is captured by the Romans. Vespasian is wounded in the foot by an arrow fired from the city wall.
- The Jewish fortress of Gamla in the Golan falls to the Romans, and its inhabitants are massacred.
- Nero travels to Greece, where he participates in the Olympic Games and other festivals.
- Nero, jealous of the success of Gnaeus Domitius Corbulo in Armenia, orders that he be put to death. Corbulo literally "falls on his sword".

=== By topic ===
==== Religion ====
- Apostles Peter and Paul are martyred in Rome (possible date).
- Linus succeeds Peter, as the second Bishop of Rome.

== Births ==
- Myeongnim Dap-bu, Korean prime minister (d. 179)
- Publius Juventius Celsus, Roman consul (d. 130)

== Deaths ==
- Publius Anteius Rufus, Roman politician
- Cestius Gallus, Roman politician and governor
- Gnaeus Domitius Corbulo, Roman general (b. c. AD 7)
- Lucius Domitius Paris, Roman freedman and actor
- Paul the Apostle, Christian martyr (b. c. AD 5)
- Paulinus of Antioch, Roman bishop and martyr
- Publius Sulpicius Scribonius, Roman politician
