= AD 126 =

126 in various calendars
- Gregorian calendar: 126; CXXVI
- Ab urbe condita: 879
- Assyrian calendar: 4876
- Balinese saka calendar: 47–48
- Bengali calendar: −468 – −467
- Berber calendar: 1076
- Buddhist calendar: 670
- Burmese calendar: −512
- Byzantine calendar: 5634–5635
- Chinese calendar: 乙丑年 (Wood Ox); 2823 or 2616 — to — 丙寅年 (Fire Tiger); 2824 or 2617
- Coptic calendar: −158 – −157
- Discordian calendar: 1292
- Ethiopian calendar: 118–119
- Hebrew calendar: 3886–3887
- Hindu calendars
- Vikram Samvat: 182–183
- Shaka Samvat: 47–48
- Kali Yuga: 3226–3227
- Holocene calendar: 10126
- Iranian calendar: 496 BP – 495 BP
- Islamic calendar: 511 BH – 510 BH
- Javanese calendar: 1–2
- Julian calendar: 126; CXXVI
- Korean calendar: 2459
- Minguo calendar: 1786 before ROC 民前1786年
- Nanakshahi calendar: −1342
- Seleucid era: 437/438 AG
- Thai solar calendar: 668–669
- Tibetan calendar: ཤིང་མོ་གླང་ལོ་ (female Wood-Ox); 252 or −129 or −901 — to — མེ་ཕོ་སྟག་ལོ་ (male Fire-Tiger); 253 or −128 or −900

Year 126 (CXXVI) was a common year starting on Monday of the Julian calendar. At the time, it was known as the Year of the Consulship of Verus and Ambibulus (or, less frequently, year 879 Ab urbe condita). The denomination 126 for this year has been used since the early medieval period, when the Anno Domini calendar era became the prevalent method in Europe for naming years.

== Events ==
=== By place ===
==== Roman Empire ====
- The old Pantheon is demolished by Emperor Hadrian, and the construction of a new one begins (its date is uncertain, because Hadrian chooses not to inscribe the temple).

==== Asia ====
- First year of the Yongjian era of the Chinese Han dynasty.

== Births ==
- August 1 – Pertinax, Roman emperor (d. 193)
- Lu Kang, Chinese politician and prefect (d. 195)

== Deaths ==
- Domitia Longina, Roman empress (b. c. 53 AD)
- Yan Ji (or Ansi), Chinese empress
