= Publius Sulpicius Scribonius Proculus =

1st century AD Roman senator and governor

Publius Sulpicius Scribonius Proculus (died AD 67) was a Roman senator, who was active during the reign of Nero. He was suffect consul in the nundinium of September to October 56 as the colleague of his brother Publius Sulpicius Scribonius Rufus. Both brothers were denounced by the delator Gaius Paccius Africanus to the emperor Nero, who summoned the men to Achaia under false pretenses. Once they arrived, they were charged under the lex maiestas, and forced to commit suicide.

== Lives ==
The lives of the brothers are only known in part. M.A. Speidel notes that the origins of the Sulpicii Scribonii are not known, but they are likely from Italy. The father of the two men is identified as the senator Scribonius Proculus, whom the emperor Caligula had murdered.

Their cursus honorum is known only from his consulate on. Tacitus records that, when faced with a riot in Puteoli in the year 58 that one senator was unable to subdue, the emperor assigned a cohort to Proculus and Rufus and sent them to that city to restore order. An inscription from the colonia Luna (modern Luni) attests that he was appointed curator operum publicorum.

The most important appointment Proculus held was governor of the imperial province of Germania Inferior. Evidence for the date of his tenure is supplied by a military diploma dated to 17 June 65, and a building dedication from the year 66. His governorship was ended when the emperor Nero summoned the two brothers to their fatal appointment in Achaia.

Political offices
Preceded by Lucius Junius Gallio Annaeanus, and Titus Cutius Ciltus as suffect consuls	Suffect consul of the Roman Empire; 56 with Publius Sulpicius Scribonius Rufus	Succeeded by Lucius Duvius Avitus, and Publius Clodius Thrasea Paetus as suffect consuls
