= AD 186 =

186 in various calendars
- Gregorian calendar: 186; CLXXXVI
- Ab urbe condita: 939
- Assyrian calendar: 4936
- Balinese saka calendar: 107–108
- Bengali calendar: −408 – −407
- Berber calendar: 1136
- Buddhist calendar: 730
- Burmese calendar: −452
- Byzantine calendar: 5694–5695
- Chinese calendar: 乙丑年 (Wood Ox); 2883 or 2676 — to — 丙寅年 (Fire Tiger); 2884 or 2677
- Coptic calendar: −98 – −97
- Discordian calendar: 1352
- Ethiopian calendar: 178–179
- Hebrew calendar: 3946–3947
- Hindu calendars
- Vikram Samvat: 242–243
- Shaka Samvat: 107–108
- Kali Yuga: 3286–3287
- Holocene calendar: 10186
- Iranian calendar: 436 BP – 435 BP
- Islamic calendar: 449 BH – 448 BH
- Javanese calendar: 62–64
- Julian calendar: 186; CLXXXVI
- Korean calendar: 2519
- Minguo calendar: 1726 before ROC 民前1726年
- Nanakshahi calendar: −1282
- Seleucid era: 497/498 AG
- Thai solar calendar: 728–729
- Tibetan calendar: ཤིང་མོ་གླང་ལོ་ (female Wood-Ox); 312 or −69 or −841 — to — མེ་ཕོ་སྟག་ལོ་ (male Fire-Tiger); 313 or −68 or −840

Year 186 (CLXXXVI) was a common year starting on Saturday of the Julian calendar. At the time, it was known as the Year of the Consulship of Aurelius and Glabrio (or, less frequently, year 939 Ab urbe condita). The denomination 186 for this year has been used since the early medieval period, when the Anno Domini calendar era became the prevalent method in Europe for naming years.

== Events ==
=== By place ===
==== Roman Empire ====
- Peasants in Gaul stage an anti-tax uprising under Maternus.
- Roman governor Pertinax escapes an assassination attempt, by British usurpers.

==== New Zealand ====
- The Hatepe volcanic eruption extends Lake Taupō and makes skies red across the world. However, recent radiocarbon dating by R. Sparks has put the date at 233 AD ± 13 (95% confidence).

== Births ==
- Ma Liang, Chinese official of the Shu Han state (d. 222)

== Deaths ==
- April 21 – Apollonius the Apologist, Christian martyr
- Bian Zhang, Chinese official and general (b. 133)
- Paccia Marciana, Roman noblewoman (approximate date)
- Sohaemus, Roman client king of Armenia
