= Gaius Anicius Cerialis =

1st century AD Roman senator and consul

Gaius Anicius Cerialis (died 66) was a Roman senator who was active during the Principate. He was suffect consul in the second half of the year 65 as the colleague of Gaius Pomponius Pius.

Beyond his consulate, Cerialis appears three times in history. The first time was during the reign of Caligula when he was accused of majestas against the emperor. Cassius Dio provides a confused account. Steven H. Rutledge provides an interpretation that makes sense of Dio: Cerialis and another senator, Sextus Papinius, were tortured, but neither provided any information. The emperor then offered to spare Papinius' life if he were to denounce his fellow conspirators, which he did; Caligula then had both "Cerialis" and the men he named executed. It is likely that by "Cerialis" Dio means Papinius, for Anicius Cerialis is very much alive years later.

The year before his election as consul the Pisonian conspiracy was uncovered. Nero delivered a speech wherein he shared the news and named the conspirators, and their punishments. The Senate then voted for a thanksgiving, and other acts flattering the emperor. Tacitus recounts other servile acts, which includes an account based on the Acta Senatus that Cerialis proposed a temple be built as soon as possible at public expense to "the Divine Nero".

The last time Cerialis appears in history is also during the reign of Nero. The year after Cerialis' consulate, in AD 66, Tacitus recounts how a delator, or informer, accused Annaeus Mela under the lex maiestas. Faced with certain destruction, Mela made his will and committed suicide. In his will, he accused Rufrius Crispinus, a former commander of the Praetorian guard, and Cerialis of majestas. Tacitus states that it was commonly believed Mela named Crispinus because the man had already taken his life; Cerialis was named because Mela wanted him dead. Cerialis soon afterwards committed suicide to avoid prosecution.

Political offices
Preceded by Aulus Licinius Nerva Silianus, and Publius Pasidienus Firmus as consuls	Suffect consul of the Roman Empire; 65 with Gaius Pomponius Pius	Succeeded by Gaius Luccius Telesinus, and Gaius Suetonius Paullinus as ordinary consuls
