= Marcus Julius Vestinus Atticus =

1st century Roman senator and consul

Marcus Julius Vestinus Atticus (died April 65) was a Roman senator, who flourished under the reign of Nero. He was consul in the year 65 as the colleague of Aulus Licinius Nerva Silianus; after his suicide he was replaced by Publius Pasidienus Firmus.

== Family ==
Werner Eck identifies Atticus as the son of the Praefectus Aegypti Lucius Julius Vestinus. Vestinus Atticus married Statilia Messalina, with whom Tacitus states Nero had an affair prior to their marriage. André Balland has argued that Messalina and Atticus had a son, to whom Martial addressed one of his epigrams (VII.32)

== His death ==
According to Suetonius, Nero murdered Atticus because he wanted to marry Messalina; after his death, Nero made Messalina his third wife. However, Tacitus provides a more detailed account of how Nero brought about Atticus' downfall: he had been a friend of Nero, but the emperor grew to hate him because Atticus saw through him and despised "the emperor's cowardice, while Nero feared the high spirits of his friend, who often bantered him with that rough humor which, when it draws largely on facts, leaves a bitter memory behind it." Nero had hoped Atticus was party to the disastrous Pisonian conspiracy, but Tacitus reports "many thought" Gaius Calpurnius Piso had not invited Atticus to take part because of his "enterprising spirit" that would replace Piso with another candidate as emperor, or even restore the Republic. When none of the conspirators named him as involved, Nero abused the Law of majestas and dispatched the tribune Gerellanus with a cohort of soldiers to Atticus' house, which towered over the Forum.

The soldiers found Atticus at his house entertaining guests, and delivered the tribune's summons. Understanding the purpose of the summons, Atticus immediately retired to his bed chambers where he killed himself. Meanwhile, the soldiers detained his guests for hours, only allowing them to leave "at a late hour of the night". Tacitus notes that Nero had "laughed over their terror at the expectation of a fatal end to their banquet" before saying "that they had suffered enough punishment for the consul's entertainment" and giving the order to release them.

== See also ==
- List of Roman consuls

Political offices
Preceded by Gaius Licinius Mucianus, and Quintus Fabius Barbarus Antonius Macer as suffect consuls	Ordinary consul of the Roman Empire; 65 with Aulus Licinius Nerva Silianus	Succeeded by Publius Pasidienus Firmus
