= 1146 =

1146 in various calendars
- Gregorian calendar: 1146; MCXLVI
- Ab urbe condita: 1899
- Armenian calendar: 595; ԹՎ ՇՂԵ
- Assyrian calendar: 5896
- Balinese saka calendar: 1067–1068
- Bengali calendar: 552–553
- Berber calendar: 2096
- English Regnal year: 11 Ste. 1 – 12 Ste. 1
- Buddhist calendar: 1690
- Burmese calendar: 508
- Byzantine calendar: 6654–6655
- Chinese calendar: 乙丑年 (Wood Ox); 3843 or 3636 — to — 丙寅年 (Fire Tiger); 3844 or 3637
- Coptic calendar: 862–863
- Discordian calendar: 2312
- Ethiopian calendar: 1138–1139
- Hebrew calendar: 4906–4907
- Hindu calendars
- Vikram Samvat: 1202–1203
- Shaka Samvat: 1067–1068
- Kali Yuga: 4246–4247
- Holocene calendar: 11146
- Igbo calendar: 146–147
- Iranian calendar: 524–525
- Islamic calendar: 540–541
- Japanese calendar: Kyūan 2 (久安２年)
- Javanese calendar: 1052–1053
- Julian calendar: 1146; MCXLVI
- Korean calendar: 3479
- Minguo calendar: 766 before ROC 民前766年
- Nanakshahi calendar: −322
- Seleucid era: 1457/1458 AG
- Thai solar calendar: 1688–1689
- Tibetan calendar: ཤིང་མོ་གླང་ལོ་ (female Wood-Ox); 1272 or 891 or 119 — to — མེ་ཕོ་སྟག་ལོ་ (male Fire-Tiger); 1273 or 892 or 120

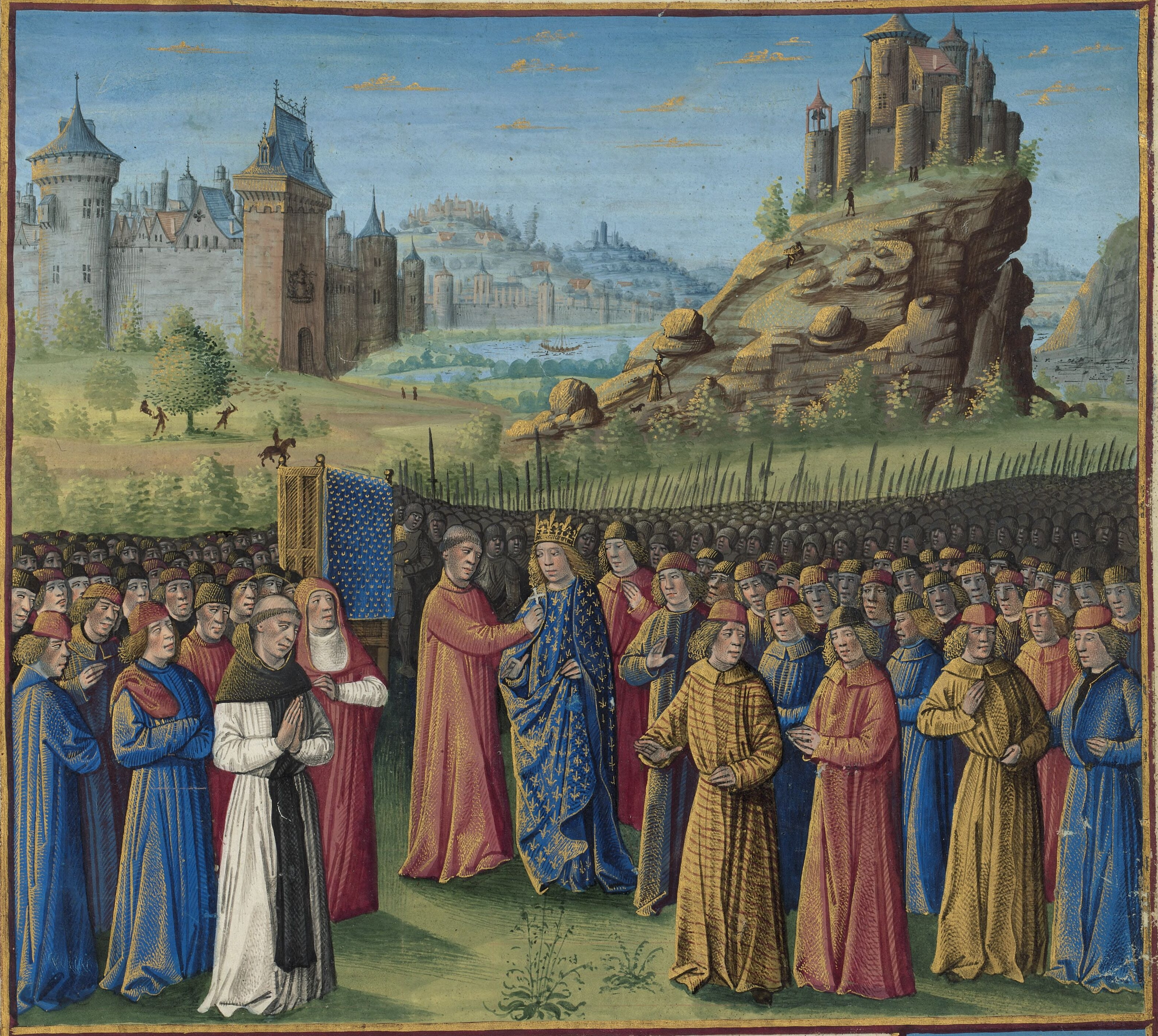
Bernard of Clairvaux (left) preaches the Second Crusade at Vézelay (Burgundy).

Year 1146 (MCXLVI) was a common year starting on Tuesday of the Julian calendar.

== Events ==
=== By place ===
==== Europe ====
- March 31 – Bernard of Clairvaux, commissioned by Pope Eugene III, preaches the Second Crusade at Vézelay, in Burgundy. King Louis VII of France and his wife, Queen Eleanor of Aquitaine, take up the cross. In a repeat of the events of 1096, Crusaders attack and massacre Jewish communities along the Rhine. Encouraged by his success, Bernard undertakes a tour in Burgundy, Lorraine and Flanders – preaching the Crusade as he goes.
- Eric III of Denmark abdicates as king, retiring to St. Canute's Abbey, Odense, where he dies on August 27, in his mid-20s. Canute V is elected to succeed him in Jutland and Sweyn III in Zealand.
- Władysław II ("the Exiled"), High Duke of Poland, suffers a defeat against the coalition forces under his brother Bolesław IV ("the Curly"). Władysław and his family escape across the border to Bohemia and later seek refuge in Germany. Bolesław captures Silesia and the Senioral territories, and becomes the new ruler of Greater Poland.
- The Republic of Genoa raids the Muslim-held Balearic Islands. The Republic of Pisa protests officially – seeing the islands as rightfully theirs. The Genoese then proceed to lay siege to Almería, in vain.
- The Republic of Genoa reaches a commercial agreement with Ramon Berenguer IV, count of Barcelona, granting privileges to merchants of both nations in the Catalan and Ligurian ports.
- December 25 – Diet of Speyer: King Conrad III takes the cross and secures the election of his 10-year-old son Henry as his successor in Germany.
- The city of Bryansk (modern Russia) is first mentioned in the Hypatian Codex.

==== Levant ====
- Autumn – Siege of Edessa: The Crusaders under Joscelin II recapture Edessa (Northern Syria) from Nur ad-Din, Seljuk ruler of Damascus. After not receiving support from the other Crusader states, Nur ad-Din counter-raids the territory of Antioch but withdraws his forces to retake Edessa in November.

==== Seljuk Empire ====
- Eldiguz, Seljuk ruler (atabeg) of Azerbaijan, founds the Eldiguzid Dynasty and establishes an independent state within the Seljuk Empire.

==== Africa ====
- Summer – King Roger II launches a full scale invasion into North Africa, seizing lands from Emir Abu'l-Hasan al-Hasan ibn Ali in what is now parts of Algeria, Tunisia and Libya – thereby opening up more of the mercantile wealth of the Muslim world to Sicilian merchants. On June 18, George of Antioch conquers Tripoli and establishes more Sicilian authority.
- The Almohad caliph Abd al-Mu'min conquers most of Morocco from the Almoravids.

=== By topic ===
==== Climate ====
- A rainy year causes the harvest to fail in Europe; one of the worst famines of the century ensues.

==== Religion ====
- March 1 – Eugene III reissues the bull Quantum praedecessores, originally issued in December 1145), proclaiming the Second Crusade.

== Births ==
- Abd al-Ghani al-Maqdisi, Arab scholar and jurist (d. 1203)
- Abu Musa al-Jazuli, Almohad philologian and writer (d. 1211)
- Fujiwara no Ikushi, Japanese empress and nun (d. 1173)
- Gerald of Wales, Welsh clergyman and chronicler (d. 1223)
- Walram I, German nobleman (House of Nassau) (d. 1198)

== Deaths ==
- February 5 – Zafadola, Arab ruler of the Hudid Dynasty
- February 26 – Geoffrey de Gorham, Norman scholar
- April 14 – Gertrude of Sulzbach, German queen (b. 1110)
- June 1 – Ermengarde of Anjou, French duchess and regent
- August 1 – Vsevolod II, Grand Prince of Kiev (Rurik dynasty)
- August 27 – Eric III, king of Denmark (House of Estridsen)
- September 14 – Imad ad-Din Zengi, Seljuk ruler of Syria
- September 15 – Alan, 1st Earl of Richmond ("the Black"), Breton noble
- Adam of Saint Victor, French Latin poet and composer
- Izz al-Din Husayn, Persian ruler of the Ghurid dynasty
- Robert Pullen, English theologian (approximate date)
- Rodrigo Gómez, Castilian nobleman and military leader
