= 1206 =

1206 in various calendars
- Gregorian calendar: 1206; MCCVI
- Ab urbe condita: 1959
- Armenian calendar: 655; ԹՎ ՈԾԵ
- Assyrian calendar: 5956
- Balinese saka calendar: 1127–1128
- Bengali calendar: 612–613
- Berber calendar: 2156
- English Regnal year: 7 Joh. 1 – 8 Joh. 1
- Buddhist calendar: 1750
- Burmese calendar: 568
- Byzantine calendar: 6714–6715
- Chinese calendar: 乙丑年 (Wood Ox); 3903 or 3696 — to — 丙寅年 (Fire Tiger); 3904 or 3697
- Coptic calendar: 922–923
- Discordian calendar: 2372
- Ethiopian calendar: 1198–1199
- Hebrew calendar: 4966–4967
- Hindu calendars
- Vikram Samvat: 1262–1263
- Shaka Samvat: 1127–1128
- Kali Yuga: 4306–4307
- Holocene calendar: 11206
- Igbo calendar: 206–207
- Iranian calendar: 584–585
- Islamic calendar: 602–603
- Japanese calendar: Genkyū 3 / Ken'ei 1 (建永元年)
- Javanese calendar: 1114–1115
- Julian calendar: 1206; MCCVI
- Korean calendar: 3539
- Minguo calendar: 706 before ROC 民前706年
- Nanakshahi calendar: −262
- Thai solar calendar: 1748–1749
- Tibetan calendar: ཤིང་མོ་གླང་ལོ་ (female Wood-Ox); 1332 or 951 or 179 — to — མེ་ཕོ་སྟག་ལོ་ (male Fire-Tiger); 1333 or 952 or 180

Temüjin becomes Genghis Khan of the Mongol Empire

Year 1206 (MCCVI) was a common year starting on Sunday of the Julian calendar.

== Events ==
=== By place ===
==== Byzantine Empire ====
- January 31 – Battle of Rusion: The Bulgarian forces (some 7,000 men), under Tsar Kaloyan, defeat the remnants of the Latin army, near the fortress of Rusion in Thrace. Around 120 knights, supported by soldiers and cavalry, are killed in battle or captured.
- February – The Bulgarians attack and loot the fortified town of Rodosto (see Battle of Rodosto), defended by a Venetian garrison. Later, Kaloyan captures many more towns and fortresses.
- August 20 – Henry of Flanders is crowned as the second emperor of the Latin Empire, in the Hagia Sophia at Constantinople, after hearing of the death of his brother, Emperor Baldwin I, who has died in prison at Baldwin's Tower in Tsarevets Castle, in Veliko Tarnovo (after being captured by the Bulgarians in 1205). Upon Henry's ascension as Latin emperor, the Lombard nobles of the Kingdom of Thessalonica refuse to give him allegiance.

==== Asia ====
- Temüjin assembles at a Kurultai, a council of chiefs of the Mongol tribes under his rule, and is elected as their leader. He is given the title of Genghis Khan of the Mongol people – founding the Mongol Empire. Genghis takes immediate steps to underpin his military command, starting with a fundamental reordering of tribal loyalties. United under one nomadic nation, under one banner and one authority.
- Muqali (or Mukhali), a Mongol general in service of Genghis Khan, is rewarded with the command of the left-wing of the newly reorganized Mongol army and takes control over the eastern Mingghans.
- March 15 – Sultan Muhammad of Ghor is murdered and succeeded by Qutb al-Din Aibak, his deputy in India, who founds the Mamluk Dynasty, the first dynasty of the Delhi Sultanate.

==== Europe ====
- King Valdemar II ("the Conqueror") and Archbishop Andreas Sunonis raid Saaremaa Island (modern Estonia), forcing the islanders to submit. The Danes build a fortress, but finding no volunteers to man it, they burn it down themselves and leave the island.
- The Livonian Brothers of the Sword, in alliance with the Semigallians, conquer the Livonians (or Livs).

==== Britain ====
- June – John, King of England ("Lackland") lands an expeditionary army at La Rochelle to defend his interests in Aquitaine, which is his from the inheritance from his mother, Queen Eleanor of Aquitaine. Meanwhile, French forces led by King Philip II ("Augustus") move south to meet John. The year's campaign ends in a stalemate and a two-year truce is made between the two rulers.

=== By topic ===
==== Art and Culture ====
- Sugar, an import from the Muslim world, is mentioned for the first time in a royal English account. Almonds, cinnamon, ginger, and nutmeg are also imported for royal banquets.

==== Religion ====
- A peasant named Thurkhill in England claims that Saint Julian took him on a tour of Purgatory. Thurkhill includes realistic touches of descriptions of Purgatory's torture chambers. This is also believed by Roger of Wendover, one of his society's leading historians.
- December – The monks of Canterbury want their own sub-prior Reginald for the post of archbishop, while King John chooses John de Gray. Pope Innocent III appoints Stephen Langton. Finally, the monks accept the Pope's decision and vote for Langton.

==== Technology ====
- The Arab engineer Ismail al-Jazari describes many mechanical inventions in his book (title translated to English) The Book of Knowledge of Ingenious Mechanical Devices.

== Births ==
- c.March 19 – Güyük Khan (or Kuyuk), Mongol emperor (d. 1248)
- April 7 – Otto II, German nobleman (d. 1253)
- unknown dates
  - Béla IV, king of Hungary and Croatia (d. 1270)
  - Hong Pok-wŏn, Korean general and official (d. 1258)
  - Yaghmurasen Ibn Zyan, Zayyanid ruler (d. 1283)
- approximate dates
  - Margaret de Quincy, English noblewoman (d. 1266)
  - Sheikh Edebali, Ottoman religious leader (d. 1326)

== Deaths ==
- February 4 – Theobald Walter, Norman High Sheriff (b. 1165)
- March 5 – Thietmar of Minden (or Dietmar), German bishop
- April 5 – Ottaviano di Paoli, Italian cardinal-bishop and diplomat
- April 7 – Frederick I, German nobleman (House of Lorraine)
- April 16 – Kujō Yoshitsune, Japanese nobleman (b. 1169)
- April 23 – Suero Rodríguez, Spanish knight and Grand Master
- June 4 – Adela of Champagne, queen of France (b. 1140)
- unknown dates
  - Artaldus (or Arthaud), French priest and bishop (b. 1101)
  - Harald Maddadsson, Norwegian nobleman (b. 1134) 9
  - Huan Zong, Chinese emperor of Western Xia (b. 1177)
  - Ismail al-Jazari, Artuqid polymath and inventor (b. 1136)
  - Muhammad of Ghor, ruler of the Ghurid Empire (b. 1149)
  - William de Burgh, English nobleman (House of Burke)
  - Yang Wanli, Chinese politician and poet (b. 1127)
