= Publius Pasidienus Firmus =

1st century AD senator and consul

Publius Pasidienus Firmus was a Roman senator, who was active during the reign of Nero. He was suffect consul in the second quarter of 65 as the colleague of Aulus Licinius Nerva Silianus, replacing Marcus Julius Vestinus Atticus whom Nero forced to commit suicide. Firmus is known entirely from inscriptions.

Pasidienus is a rare gentilicium. Bernard Remy believes it is Etruscan in origin. However, noting that the suffix -enus was typical of names from Picenum and the vicinity, other authorities believe that the Pasidieni were of Picentine or Umbrian descent.

Based on a fragmentary inscription, Attilio Degrassi identified Firmus with the ordinary consul for the year, Nerva Silianus, arguing that Nerva Silianus had a polyonymous name. Some authorities were uncomfortable with this identification, since it presumed Firmus had been adopted by a member of the patrician Licinii Nervae, which would lead to a number of problems. The discovery of a military diploma dated to 18 June of the consulship of Nerva Silianus and Pasidienus Firmus decisively proved they were two different men.

This strengthened the likely identification of Firmus with the identically named proconsular governor of Bithynia and Pontus. He is known from coins minted in Nicomedia, and a Greek inscription erected by Nicea and Nicomedia to memorialize him as their patron. This Firmus is thought to have governed the public province for two years during the reign of Claudius; Remy offers a specific term for his tenure, from the year 48 to 50. Remy connects his lengthy tenure to the victorious campaign (in 48–49) of Gaius Julius Aquila in the Cimmerian Bosphorus against Mithridates, the former king of Bosphorus, a campaign to which Claudius and his advisers attributed exceptional importance by awarding excessive rewards to the victorious generals. If these two are the same man, this would suggest that Firmus came to the consulate quite late in life, 15 years after his governing Bithynia and more than 20 years after he was praetor, typical for a homo novus.

It is clear that he is related to Lucius Pasidienus Firmus, suffect consul in 75. If the younger Firmus were his son, the unusually brief period between their consulates would help confirm the theory he came to the consulate late in life. However, it is equally possible the younger Firmus could be a nephew or a cousin.

Political offices
Preceded by Marcus Julius Vestinus Atticus as ordinary consuls	Suffect consul of the Roman Empire; 65 with Aulus Licinius Nerva Silianus	Succeeded by Gaius Pomponius Pius, and Gaius Anicius Cerialis as suffect consuls
