= Marcus Annius Afrinus =

1st century Roman senator, consul and governor

Marcus Annius Afrinus was a Roman senator, who held a number of offices in the emperor's service. He was suffect consul in July-August 66 with Gaius Paccius Africanus as his colleague. He is known primarily from inscriptions.

== Background ==
Bernard Remy states that nothing is known of his origins, but notes C. Castillo suggests Afrinus may have come from Hispania Baetica.

Due to his nomenclature it has been suspected by modern researchers that he may have been related to the emperors of the Nerva–Antonine dynasty. Emperor Marcus Aurelius original belonged to the gens Annia before the adoption by Antoninus Pius, and Annius cognomen "Afrinus" was unusual and recalled the cognomen of emperor Hadrian's father Publius Aelius Hadrianus Afer.

== Career ==
The cursus honorum of Afrinus is imperfectly known. His first attested office was governor of the imperial province of Galatia from around the year 49 to 54; he is surmised to have been a popular governor, for his name and portrait appear on the coinage of Claudiconium. For reasons unknown, his advancement to the consulate was much delayed; according to the Lex annales, for non-patricians the gap between praetor and consul was 12 years, while it took Afrinus at least 17 years to advance to the consulate.

We know of only one office from the consular portion of his cursus. Afrinus was governor of the imperial province of Pannonia, immediately succeeding Lucius Tampius Flavianus in late 69, until the year 73. His life afterwards is a blank.

Political offices
Preceded by Gaius Luccius Telesinus, and Gaius Suetonius Paulinus (II?) as ordinary consuls	Suffect consul of the Roman Empire; 66 with Gaius Paccius Africanus	Succeeded by Marcus Arruntius Aquila, and Marcus Vettius Bolanus as suffect consuls
