= Gaius Catellius Celer =

1st century Roman senator and suffect consul

Gaius Catellius Celer (also known as Lucius Pompeius Vopiscus Gaius Catellius Celer) was a Roman senator who flourished during the Flavian dynasty. He served as suffect consul for the nundinium September-October 77 with Marcus Arruntius Aquila as his colleague.

== Name ==
The nomen "Catellius" is rare. Ronald Syme could only find it represented in three cities: Aesernia (modern Isernia), Forum Sempronii (modern Fossombrone), and Volsinii, where four freedmen of a Lucius Catellius are attested. Syme has narrowed the choice between these: a fragmentary name "Q. Pompeius [...] Cat[...]" attested at Volsinii, points to Volsinii as his home town.

At times Celer also included the nomen "Arruntius" in his name, indicating either that his mother belonged to that family, or he received a legacy from someone of that family in return for adopting that person's name, a practice referred to by scholars as "testamentary adoption". Further, no later than AD 80 Celer adopted the longer version of his name -- Lucius Pompeius Vopiscus Catellius Celer -- suggesting he accepted another testamentary adoption around that time, in this case from one Lucius Pompeius Vopiscus. This Pompeius Vopiscus might be the suffect consul of 69.

== Career ==
Details of Celer's life are lacking before 20 May 75, when he first appears in the records of the Arval Brethren as a member of that college. Syme argues that between that date and October 77, when he is mentioned again, he was away from Rome, serving as governor of Lusitania. He returned to Rome to serve as suffect consul in 77, and attended all the known ceremonies of the Arval Brethren until 86, and does not appear again until 27 May 90. Syme explains his absence by dating Celer's term as juridicus of Tarraconensis to these years. Prior to serving as juridicus, Celer is known to have served as curator operum publicorum, succeeding Marcus Hirrius Fronto Neratius Pansa.

In AD 91, when he was eligible to participate in the sortition for the proconsulate of either Africa or Asia, he failed to obtain either one.

== Family ==
Some authorities raise the possibility that Pompeia Celerina, the mother of Pliny the Younger's second wife, was Celer's daughter. In his monograph on Imperial Roman nomenclature, Olli Salomies points out that if this were the case, she had to be born after Celer accepted the testamentary adoption from Pompeius Vopiscus -- after 80 -- but "a lady born at the earliest in c. 80 cannot have been the mother of Pliny's second wife."

Political offices
Preceded by Caesar Domitianus V, and Titus Caesar Vespasianus VI	Suffect Consul of the Roman Republic; 77 with Marcus Arruntius Aquila	Succeeded by Gnaeus Julius Agricola, and ignotus as Suffect consul
