= Lucius Duvius Avitus =

1st century AD Roman senator and provincial governor

Lucius Duvius Avitus was a Roman senator, who held several offices in the emperor's service. He was suffect consul in the nundinium of November to December 56 with Publius Clodius Thrasea Paetus as his colleague. Avitus is the only known member of his family known to have held the consulship.

Prior to becoming consul, Avitus is known to have been governor of the imperial province of Gallia Aquitania, in an unknown year. However, his tenure as governor of Germania Inferior is better known, which he held from 58 to the year 60. Tacitus records his military activities in the year 58. After the Frisii unsuccessfully attempted to migrate into the province and settle on some uninhabited lands, the Ampsivarii, one of the Germanic tribes, likewise attempted to relocate there. Avitus' official response was to command them to submit to Roman rule; unofficially he told their king Boiocalus, an old personal friend, that he was willing to cede to them the lands to live on. However, the Ampsivarii took offense to this response, and called to their old allies to aid them to invade Germania Inferior. Avitus responded to this threat by writing to Titus Curtilius Mancia, governor of Germania Superior, and asking him to campaign on the further side of the Rhine. This demonstration of force cowed the allies Boiocalus had called on, and the Ampsivarii were forced to retreat to the lands of the Usipii and the Tubantes. These tribes did not provide them shelter for long, and the Ampsivarii were forced to seek shelter from other peoples. Tacitus relates that "after long wanderings, as destitute outcasts, received now as friends[,] now as foes, their entire youth were slain in a strange land, and who could not fight[,] were apportioned as booty."

Political offices
Preceded by Publius Sulpicius Scribonius Rufus, and Publius Sulpicius Scribonius Proculus as Suffect consuls	Suffect consul of the Roman Empire; 56 with Publius Clodius Thrasea Paetus	Succeeded by Nero II, and Lucius Calpurnius Piso as Ordinary consuls
