= Marcus Vettius Bolanus =

Roman senator and governor (AD c. 33-76)

Marcus Vettius Bolanus (c. 33 – 76) was a Roman senator and soldier. He was suffect consul for the nundinium of September-December 66 as the colleague of Marcus Arruntius Aquila.

== Career ==
Bolanus served in Anatolia under Corbulo in 62. He became governor of Britain in 69 in the midst of the Year of four emperors, appointed by the short-lived emperor Vitellius. His predecessor, Marcus Trebellius Maximus, had been undermined and forced to flee by a mutiny led by Marcus Roscius Coelius, commander of Legio XX Valeria Victrix. Bolanus was joined by Legio XIV Gemina, which had been withdrawn from Britain in 67 and was still loyal to Vitellius's defeated opponent, Otho.

Bolanus had to face the second insurrection of Venutius amongst the Brigantes. Cartimandua, Venutius's ex-wife and queen of the Brigantes, had been a loyal client ruler for twenty years, and the Romans had defended her against an earlier revolt by her ex-husband. On this occasion, however, Bolanus was only able to send auxiliaries. Cartimandua was evacuated, leaving the kingdom to Venutius.

By the end of 69, Vespasian had established himself as emperor and set about restoring control. The XIVth Gemina was withdrawn again in 70 to help put down unrest on the lower Rhine, and Roscius Coelius was replaced as commander of XX Valeria Victrix by Gnaeus Julius Agricola. Bolanus remained as governor until 71. The poet Statius speaks of him establishing forts and capturing trophies from a British king, which suggests that he was able to reconquer some of the territory lost in the revolt. He was succeeded by Quintus Petillius Cerialis.

For 75/76, Bolanus was appointed governor of Asia.

He is the father of the Roman politician and senator Gaius Clodius Crispinus.

Political offices
Preceded by Marcus Annius Afrinus; Gaius Paccius Africanus as suffecti	Roman consul 66 (suffect) with Marcus Arruntius Aquila	Succeeded by Lucius Julius Rufus; Fonteius Capito as ordinarii
Preceded by Marcus Trebellius Maximus	Roman governor of Britain; 69-71	Succeeded by Quintus Petillius Cerialis
