= Gaius Suetonius Paulinus =

1st century Roman general and provincial governor

- Caius Suetonius Paulinus
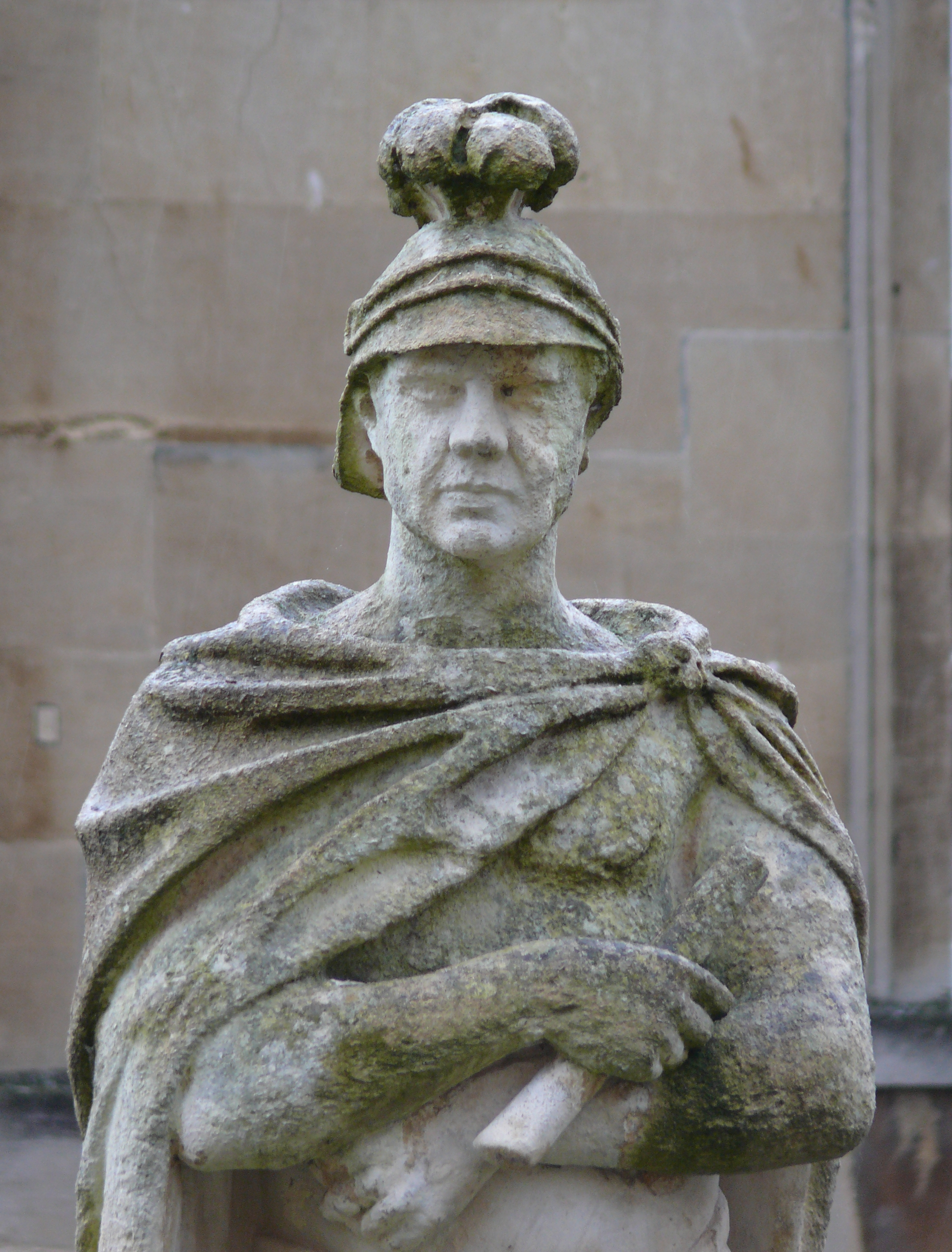
- 19th-century statue of Gaius Suetonius Paulinus on the terrace of the Roman Baths in Bath, Somerset
- Born: before 10 AD; Probably Pisaurum (modern Pesaro), Italy, Roman Empire
- Died: after 69 AD
- Military career
- Allegiance: Roman Empire
- Wars: Roman conquest of Anglesey; Battle of Watling Street; Battle of Bedriacum

Gaius Suetonius Paulinus (Note: Also spelled Paullinus. When Tacitus refers to Gaius Suetonius Paulinus by one name, he almost invariably uses "Suetonius" rather than "Paulinus", and this convention is used here. Later sources often prefer to use "Paulinus", as "Suetonius" is usually understood to refer to the historian.) (fl. AD 40–69) was a Roman general best known as the commander who defeated Boudica and her army during the Boudican revolt.

== Early life ==
Little is known of Suetonius' family, but it likely came from Pisaurum (modern Pesaro), a town on the Adriatic coast of Italy.

== Mauretanian campaign ==
Having served as praetor in 40 AD, Suetonius was appointed governor of Mauretania (modern northern Morocco) the following year. In collaboration with Gnaeus Hosidius Geta he suppressed the revolt led by Aedemon in the mountainous province; that arose from the execution of the local ruler Ptolemy by Caligula. In 41 AD Suetonius was the first Roman commander to lead troops across the Atlas Mountains, and Pliny the Elder quotes his description of the area in his Natural History.

== Governor of Britain ==
In 58 AD, before being consul, he was appointed governor of Britain, replacing Quintus Veranius, who had died in office. He continued Veranius' policy of aggressively subduing the tribes of modern Wales, and was successful for his first two years in the post. His reputation as a general came to rival that of Gnaeus Domitius Corbulo. Two future governors served under him: Quintus Petillius Cerialis as legate of Legio IX Hispana, and Gnaeus Julius Agricola as a military tribune attached to II Augusta, but seconded to Suetonius's staff.

Around 60 or 61 AD Suetonius made an assault on the island of Mona (Anglesey), a refuge for British fugitives and a stronghold of the druids. The tribes of the south-east took advantage of his absence and staged a revolt, led by queen Boudica of the Iceni. The colonia of Camulodunum (Colchester) was destroyed, its inhabitants tortured, raped, and slaughtered, and Petillius Cerialis's legion routed. Suetonius brought Mona to terms and marched along the Roman road of Watling Street to Londinium (London), the rebels' next target, but judged he did not have the numbers to defend the city and ordered it evacuated. The Britons duly destroyed it, the citizens of Londinium suffering the same fate as those of Camulodunum, and then did the same to Verulamium (St Albans).

Suetonius regrouped with the XIV Gemina, some detachments of the XX Valeria Victrix, and all available auxiliaries. The II Augusta, based at Exeter, was available, but its prefect, Poenius Postumus, declined to heed the call. Nonetheless, Suetonius was able to assemble a force of about ten thousand men. Heavily outnumbered (the Britons numbered 230,000 according to Cassius Dio), the Romans stood their ground. The resulting battle took place at an unidentified location in a defile with a wood behind him, probably in the West Midlands somewhere along Watling Street – at Cuttle Mill, 2 miles southeast of Towcester in Northamptonshire, in front of a narrow defile which answers the topographical description of Tacitus, human bones have been found over a large area; High Cross in Leicestershire and Manduessedum near the modern day town of Atherstone in Warwickshire have also been suggested - where Roman tactics and discipline triumphed over British numbers. The Britons' flight was impeded by the presence of their own families, whom they had stationed in a ring of wagons at the edge of the battlefield, and defeat turned into slaughter. Tacitus heard reports that almost eighty thousand Britons were killed, compared to only four hundred Romans. Boudica poisoned herself, and Postumus, having denied his men a share in the victory, fell on his sword.

Suetonius reinforced his army with legionaries and auxiliaries from Germania and conducted punitive operations against any remaining pockets of resistance, but this proved counterproductive. The new procurator, Gaius Julius Alpinus Classicianus, expressed concern to the Emperor Nero that Suetonius's activities would only lead to continued hostilities. An inquiry was set up under Nero's freedman, Polyclitus, and an excuse, that Suetonius had lost some ships, was found to relieve him of his command. He was replaced by the more conciliatory Publius Petronius Turpilianus. But Suetonius was not disgraced: a lead tessera found in Rome features both his and Nero's names and symbols of victory, and a man named Gaius Suetonius Paulinus was consul in 66 AD, either a son of the same name or the general himself appointed for a second time.

== Year of Four Emperors ==
In 69, during the year of civil wars that followed the death of Nero (see Year of Four Emperors), Suetonius was one of Otho's senior generals and military advisors. He and Aulus Marius Celsus defeated Aulus Caecina Alienus, one of Vitellius's generals, near Cremona, but Suetonius would not allow his men to follow up their advantage and was accused of treachery as a result. When Caecina joined his forces with those of Fabius Valens, Suetonius advised Otho not to risk a battle but was overruled, leading to Otho's decisive defeat at Bedriacum. Suetonius was captured by Vitellius and obtained a pardon by claiming that he had deliberately lost the battle for Otho, although this was almost certainly untrue. His eventual fate remains unknown.

== Notes ==
Political offices
Preceded by Quintus Veranius	Governor of Britain; 58 - 62	Succeeded by Publius Petronius Turpilianus
Preceded by Gaius Pomponius Pius and Gaius Anicius Cerialis as consules suffecti	Consul of the Roman Empire; 66 with Gaius Luccius Telesinus	Succeeded by Marcus Annius Afrinus and Gaius Paccius Africanus as consules suffecti
