= Arruntius (physician) =

Ancient Roman physician

Arruntius was a physician of ancient Rome who lived probably about the beginning or middle of the first century CE, and is mentioned by Pliny the Elder as having gained by his practice the annual income of 250,000 sestertii. This may give us some notion of the fortunes made by physicians at Rome about the beginning of the empire.
