= Du Bois Agett =

Settler of Western Australia

- Born: 1796
- Died: 25 December 1866; Fremantle, Western Australia
- Known for: Early settler of Western Australia
- Spouse: Eliza
- Children: 8

Du Bois Agett (1796 – 25 December 1866) was a British businessman who became an early settler of Western Australia, arriving in 1830.

== Biography ==
Agett was born in 1796, and according to the 1832 Western Australian census was from London. Before arriving in Western Australia, Agett was a member of the London Stock Exchange. He was also married to Eliza, who was from Greenwich. Before they both left for Western Australia, they had seven children together: Richard (1818-1857) and George (1821-1859), who were born in Lewisham; Emma (1823/4-1903); Harry (1824-1853), Frederick (born 1825), and Edwin (born 1827), all born in Clapham; and Charles (born 1829), who was born in Le Havre, France. Another child, Mary Ann, was born in Western Australia on 13 October 1830.

On 13 February 1830, the family with several servants arrived in the Swan River Colony via Cape Town onboard the Egyptian. Agett then received land grants on the Swan and Avon Rivers, with him living in the town of York between June and July 1832. However, his farming and business ventures in Western Australia failed and he was obliged to become a clerk in the Customs Department. He retired as a customs clerk in 1853. He had also explored the Avon valley with Rivett Henry Bland in 1834.

Agett died on 25 December 1866 at age 70 in Fremantle, with wife Eliza dying on 29 June 1883 in North Fremantle.

== General and cited sources ==
- Shoobert, Joanne, ed. (2005). Western Australian Exploration: Volume One, December 1826–December 1825. Victoria Park, Western Australia: Hesperian Press. ISBN 0859053512.
