= Gaius Luccius Telesinus =

1st century AD Roman senator and consul

Gaius Luccius Telesinus was a Roman senator who was active during the first century CE. He was ordinary consul for the year 66 with Gaius Suetonius Paulinus as his colleague. In Philostratus' Life of Apollonius, Telesinus had been depicted as a pious consul conversing with Apollonius of Tyana. He allows Apollonius entry into Rome's temples, his residence there, and adoption of Apollonius' reforms by the temples. According to Philostratus, Telesinus continued to study philosophy under Apollonius.

== Inscriptions ==
- CIL VI, 8639
- CIL XI, 395
- RMD III 2016
- AE 1946, 124

Political offices
Preceded by Gaius Pomponius Pius, and Gaius Anicius Cerialis as consules suffecti	Consul of the Roman Empire; 66 with Gaius Suetonius Paulinus (II?)	Succeeded by Marcus Annius Afrinus, and Gaius Paccius Africanus as consules suffecti
