= Ilia Solomonovich Abelman =

Russian astronomer (1866–1898)

- Born: 1866 (in Julian calendar); Daugavpils
- Died: 29 December 1898 (in Julian calendar) (aged 31–32)
- Alma mater: Riga Alexander Gymnasium; Moscow State University; Humboldt University of Berlin
- Occupation: Astronomer
- Academic career
- Institutions: Pulkovo Observatory

Ilia Solomonovich Abelman (Russian: Илья Соломонович Абельман; 1866–1898) was a Russian astronomer.

== Life ==
Abelman was born at Dünaburg, now Daugavpils, in 1866. His early education was received at the gymnasium of Riga, whence he graduated in 1887, gaining the gold medal. He proceeded to the University of Moscow, and, after graduating in astronomy and geodesy, took a year's course (1892-1893) at the University of Berlin. He afterward worked in the observatories of Pulkovo and St. Petersburg.

He died at Wilna, December 29, 1898.

== Works ==
In 1887, while at the Riga gymnasium, he published "Sbornik Algebraicheskikh Zadach." His treatise "O Padayushchikh Zvyezdakh" was adopted by the University of Moscow as a text-book for young astronomers. Another of his works, "O Dvizhenii Nyekotorykh Meteornykh Potokov," was published in 1898 by the Imperial Russian Astronomical Society of St. Petersburg, of which he was a member. Abelman also published a series of articles on astronomy in the "Russkiya Vyedomosti," in "Novosti," in "Astronomische Nachrichten," and in some other German periodicals.
