= Fonteius Capito (consul 67) =

1st century Roman senator, consul and governor

Fonteius Capito was a Roman senator, who was active during the reign of Nero. He was consul for the year 67 as the colleague of Lucius Julius Rufus.

Capito came from a plebeian family whose members had reached the rank of praetor since the 2nd century BC, but none had achieved the consulate until the end of the Republic, in 33 BC, when Gaius Fonteius Capito did so. According to Cicero, the Fonteii came from Tusculum. Capito was probably the son or grandson of the eponymous consul of the year 12; his brother Gaius Fonteius Capito was one of the consuls of the year 59.

Capito's only known office was as governor of the imperial province of Germania Inferior. He assisted in the suppression of the revolt of Vindex, as well as having the Batavian king Julius Paullus Civilis executed and his brother Julius Civilis arrested and sent to Rome. Soon after Nero took his life and Galba became emperor, Capito was executed by the orders of the legionary commanders Cornelius Aquinus and Fabius Valens, allegedly because he was plotting against Galba. Tacitus records some believed that although Capito was "foully stained with avarice and profligacy", he was otherwise loyal to Galba and instead Aquinus and Valens were the ones intriguing against Galba; to hide their treason they accused Capito, who, once dead, could not respond to these accusations. The troops believed that a third commander, Julius Burdo, commander of the Rhine Fleet, was also responsible for Capito's death; he was held in prison to save his life.

Political offices
Preceded by Marcus Arruntius Aquila, and Marcus Vettius Bolanus as suffect consuls	Consul of the Roman Empire; 67 with Lucius Julius Rufus	Succeeded by Lucius Aurelius Priscus as suffect consul
