= Marcus Arruntius Aquila (consul 66) =

1st century Roman senator and suffect consul

Marcus Arruntius Aquila was a Roman senator who flourished during the Principate. He held the office of suffect consul in 66 with Marcus Vettius Bolanus as his colleague. His name in the Acta Arvalia (CIL VI, 2044) is missing the cognomen, which Giuseppe Camodeca reconstructed from an unpublished wax tablet from Herculeium.

Aquila came of a Patavine family, a descendant of Arruntius Aquila, the governor of Galatia in 6 BC, who had a son named Marcus. He is known to be the father of Marcus Arruntius Aquila, consul in 77. That his son became consul 11 years later led Ronald Syme to suspect the elder Aquila "was more than mature in age" when he assumed the fasces. Aquila is possibly related to Lucius Arruntius Stella, consul in 100.

His career is not well known. Only one of the offices he held is known: a milepost recovered from Lycia attests that he served as a procurator for the emperor Claudius in AD 50.

Political offices
Preceded by Marcus Annius Afrinus; Gaius Paccius Africanus as suffecti	Roman consul 66 (suffect) with Marcus Vettius Bolanus	Succeeded by Lucius Julius Rufus; Fonteius Capito as ordinarii
