= Marcus Arruntius Aquila (consul 77) =

1st century AD Roman senator and consul

Marcus Arruntius Aquila was a Roman senator who flourished during the Flavian dynasty. Although he was a suffect consul for the nundinium of September-October 77 with Gaius Catellius Celer, Ronald Syme notes that like the other consuls who came from Patavium (modern Padua), Aquila "failed to play a role in political life."

His father was Marcus Arruntius Aquila, suffect consul in 66. Either the elder Aquila had his son at a relatively early point in his life, or he acceded to the consulship late in life.

A surviving inscription provides an outline of his career. Despite an auspicious start being selected as one of the tresviri monetales for his term in the vigintiviri, and serving his quaestorship in attendance to an unnamed emperor (likely Nero whose name was commonly omitted from inscriptions due to damnatio memoriae), except for his suffect consulship, Aquila's only other recorded achievement was becoming a member of the Quindecimviri sacris faciundis, one of the more prestigious collegia of Roman priesthoods. Syme notes, "That college tended to annex senators of cultivated tastes."

Political offices
Preceded by Caesar Domitianus V, and Titus Caesar Vespasianus VI	Suffect Consul of the Roman Republic; 77 with Lucius Pompeius Vopiscus Catellius Celer	Succeeded by Gnaeus Julius Agricola, and ignotus as Suffect consul
