= Delator =

Denouncer in law

Delator (plural: delatores, feminine: delatrix) is Latin for a denouncer, one who indicates to a court another as having committed a punishable deed.

== Secular Roman law ==
In Roman history, it was properly one who gave notice (deferre) to the treasury officials of monies that had become due to the imperial fiscus. This special meaning was extended to those who lodged information as to punishable offences, and further, to those who brought a public accusation (whether true or not) against any person (especially with the object of getting money). Although the word delator itself, for "common informer," is confined to imperial times, the right of public accusation had long existed. When exercised from patriotic and disinterested motives, its effects were beneficial; but the moment the principle of reward was introduced, this was no longer the case. Sometimes the accuser was rewarded with the rights of citizenship, a place in the Senate, or a share of the property of the accused. At the end of the republican period, Cicero (De officiis, ii. 14) expresses his opinion that such accusations should be undertaken only in the interests of the state or for other urgent reasons.

Under the Roman Empire the system became openly corrupt, which reached its height during the reign of Tiberius, although the delators continued to exercise their activity till the reign of Theodosius I. They were drawn from all classes of society: patricians, equites, freedmen, slaves, philosophers, literary men, and, above all, lawyers. The objects of their attacks were the wealthy, all possible rivals of the emperor, and those whose conduct implied a reproach against the imperial mode of life. Special opportunities were afforded by the law of majestas, which was originally directed against attacks on the ruler by word or deed but came to include all kinds of accusations with which it really had nothing to do; indeed, according to Tacitus, a charge of treason was regularly added to all criminal charges. The chief motive for these accusations was no doubt the desire of amassing wealth, since by the law of majestas one-fourth of the goods of the accused, even if he committed suicide in order to avoid confiscation (which was always carried out in the case of those condemned to capital punishment), was assured to the accuser (who was hence called quadruplator).

Pliny the Elder and Martial mention instances of enormous fortunes amassed by professional delators. But it was not without its dangers. If the delator lost his case or refused to carry it through, he was liable to the same penalties as the accused; he was exposed to the risk of vengeance at the hands of the proscribed in the event of their return, or of their relatives; while emperors like Tiberius would have no scruples about banishing or putting out of the way those whom he had no further use for and who might have proved dangerous to himself.

Titus drove into exile or reduced to slavery those who had served Nero, after they had first been flogged in the amphitheatre. The abuses reappeared under Domitian; the delators, with whom Vespasian had not interfered, although he had abolished trials for majestas, were again banished by Trajan, and threatened with capital punishment in an edict of Constantine; but delating lasted till the end of the 4th century.

== Canon law ==
The term delatores was used by the Hispanian Synod of Elvira (c. 306) to stigmatize those Christians who appeared as accusers of their brethren. This synod decided that if any Christian was proscribed or put to death through the denunciation (delatio) of another Christian, such a delator was to suffer perpetual excommunication, an extreme ecclesiastical punishment.

No distinction is made between true and false accusation, but the synod probably meant only the accusation of Christianity before the pagan judges, or at most a false accusation. Any false accusation against a bishop, priest or deacon was visited with a similar punishment by the same synod. The punishment for false witness in general was proportioned by can. lxxiv to the gravity of the accusation.

The Council of Arles (314) issued a similar decree when it decided that Christians who accused falsely their brethren were to be forever excluded from communion with the faithful.

During the persecutions of the early Christians it sometimes happened that apostates denounced their fellow Christians. The younger Pliny relates in a letter to Trajan that an anonymous bill of indictment was presented to him on which were many names of Christians; we do not know if the author of this libellus was a Christian. According to can. xiii of the Council of Arles, during the persecution of Diocletian Christians were denounced by their own brethren to the pagan judges. If it appeared from the public acts that an ecclesiastic had done this, he was punished by the synod with perpetual deposition; however, his ordinations were still considered valid.

In general, false accusation is visited with severe punishments in later synods, e.g. Second Council of Arles, the Council of Agde and others. These decrees appear in the later medieval collections of canons.

New punitive decrees against calumny were issued by Pope Gregory IX in his Decretals.

== Uses as an English word ==
See Owen J. Blum, OFM Peter Damian Letters 31–60 (Washington D.C.: The Catholic University of America, 1990), 49 ("being an informer and delator of my brother's crimes").

In the alternate reality TV series An Englishman's Castle, depicting a Nazi-occupied Britain, the word "delator" is revived in reference to informers helping the Nazi occupiers.
