= Law of maiestas =

Crimes against the state in ancient Rome

The law of maiestas or law of majestas (Classical Latin: lēx māiestātis), encompasses several ancient Roman laws (lēgēs) throughout the Republican and Imperial periods dealing with crimes against the Roman people, state, or emperor.

== Description ==
In Roman law, the offences originally falling under the head of treason were almost exclusively those committed in military service. The very name perduellio, the name of the crime in the older Roman law, is evidence of this. Perduelles were, strictly, public enemies who bore arms against the state; and traitors were regarded as having no more rights than public enemies. The Twelve Tables made it punishable with death to communicate with the enemy or to betray a citizen to the enemy. Other kinds of perduellio were punished by "interdiction of fire and water" (aquae et ignis interdictio), in other words, banishment. The crime was tried before a special tribunal (quaestio) by two officials (duumviri perduellionis), which was perhaps the earliest permanent criminal court existing at Rome.

At a later period, the name of perduellio gave place to that of laesa maiestas, deminuta or minuta maiestas, or simply maiestas. The lex Iulia maiestatis, to which the date of 48 B.C. has been conjecturally assigned, continued to be the basis of the Roman law of treason until the latest period of the empire. The original text of the law appears to have still dealt with what were chiefly military offences, such as sending letters or messages to the enemy, giving up a standard or fortress, and desertion.

== Expansion of the law of treason under Tiberius ==
With the Empire, the law of treason was greatly expanded in scope, mainly in the reign of Tiberius, and led to the rise of a class of professional informers, called delatores. The concept of the emperor as divine had much to do with this. It became a maxim that treason was next to sacrilege in gravity.

The law as it existed in the time of Justinian is contained chiefly in the titles of the Digest and Codex Ad legem Iuliam maiestatis. The definition given in the Digest (taken from Ulpian) is this: ''maiestatis crimen illud est quod adversus populum Romanum vel adversus securitatem eius committitur." ("The crime of majestas is that which is committed against the Roman people or against their safety.") Of treasons other than military offences, some of the more noticeable were the raising of an army or levying war without the command of the emperor, the questioning of the emperor's choice of a successor, the murder of (or conspiracy to murder) hostages or certain magistrates of high rank, the occupation of public places, the meeting within the city of persons hostile to the state with weapons or stones, incitement to sedition or administration of unlawful oaths, release of prisoners justly confined, falsification of public documents, and failure of a provincial governor to quit his province at the expiration of his office or to deliver his army to his successor.

The intention (voluntas) was punishable as much as an overt act (effectus). "Principes instar deorum esse" ("Emperors are as gods") are the words of Tacitus. This crime was called laesa maiestas divina in later law. It was not treason to repair a statue of the emperor which had decayed from age, to hit such a statue with a stone thrown by chance, to melt down such a statue if unconsecrated, to use mere verbal insults against the emperor, to fail in keeping an oath sworn by the emperor or to decide a case contrary to an imperial constitution.

Treason was one of the publica judicia, i.e. one of those crimes in which any citizen was entitled to prosecute. The law deprived the accused in a charge of treason of his ordinary remedy for malicious prosecution, and also took from him the privilege (which those accused of other crimes generally possessed) of immunity from accusation by women or infamous persons, from liability to be put to the torture, and from having his slaves tortured to make them testify against him.

== Punishment ==
The punishment from the time of Tiberius was death (usually by beheading) and confiscation of property, coupled with complete civil disability. A traitor could not make a will or a gift or emancipate a slave. Even the death of the accused, if guilty of treason of the gravest kind, such as levying war against the state, did not extinguish the charge, but the memory of the deceased became infamous, and his property was forfeited as though he had been convicted in his lifetime.
