= Pactumeia gens =

Ancient Roman family

The gens Pactumeia was a minor plebeian family at ancient Rome. Members of this gens are not mentioned by the historians until imperial times, when one branch of the family achieved high rank, holding several consulships during the first and second centuries.

== Origin ==
The nomen Pactumeius belongs to a class of gentilicia formed from other names using the suffix -eius. This type of name is frequently, but not uniformly associated with names of Oscan origin. Its root is uncertain, as its root would be expected to be a cognomen, Pactumus, or perhaps another gentile name, Pactumius, both of which are unknown. The closest known name seems to be the Oscan praenomen Paccius, occasionally written Pactius, which was itself used as a nomen gentilicium, as well as forming nomina with other suffixes, such as Pacilius, Paconius, and probably Pacidius.

== Branches and cognomina ==
The most illustrious family of the Pactumeii used the cognomina Clemens, Fronto, and Magnus, of which Clemens, meaning "gentle" or "mild", seems to have been the original surname. This family was descended from a Publius Pactumeius, who evidently lived in Africa. Both of his sons were named Quintus, but were distinguished by their cognomina, the elder retaining Clemens, while the younger son assumed the surname Fronto, originally designating someone with a prominent forehead. A later generation of the family bore the cognomen Magnus, meaning "great".

== Members ==
This list includes abbreviated praenomina. For an explanation of this practice, see filiation.

- Quintus Aurelius Pactumeius P. f. Clemens, consul in an uncertain year during the reign of Vespasian. He was the first consul to have been born in Africa.
- Quintus Aurelius Pactumeius P. f. Fronto, the brother of Clemens, was consul suffectus in AD 80.
- Pactumeia Vera, probably the daughter of Quintus Pactumeius Clemens.
- Publius Pactumeius P. f. Clemens, consul suffectus in AD 138, held a number of public posts under the emperors Hadrian and Antoninus Pius. He was also a jurist, whom Sextus Pomponius cites as an authority on the constitution of Antoninus Pius.
- Titus Pactumeius Magnus, governor of Egypt from AD 176 to 179.
- Pactumeia Q. l., a freedwoman known from an inscription at Alexandria.
- Titus Pactumeius P. f. P. n. Magnus, consul suffectus in AD 183. He was one of a group of six former consuls put to death by Commodus, together with their families.
- Pactumeia T. f. P. n. Magna, daughter of the consul Pactumeius Magnus.
- Pactumeius Androsthenes, apparently a freedman of the consul Pactumeius Magnus.

== See also ==
- List of Roman gentes

== Bibliography ==
- Lucius Cassius Dio Cocceianus (Cassius Dio), Roman History.
- Aelius Lampridius, Aelius Spartianus, Flavius Vopiscus, Julius Capitolinus, Trebellius Pollio, and Vulcatius Gallicanus, Historia Augusta (Augustan History).
- Digesta seu Pandectae (The Digest).
- Dictionary of Greek and Roman Biography and Mythology, William Smith, ed., Little, Brown and Company, Boston (1849).
- George Davis Chase, "The Origin of Roman Praenomina", in Harvard Studies in Classical Philology, vol. VIII (1897).
- Paul von Rohden, Elimar Klebs, & Hermann Dessau, Prosopographia Imperii Romani (The Prosopography of the Roman Empire, abbreviated PIR), Berlin (1898).
- Guido Bastianini, "Lista dei prefetti d'Egitto dal 30^{a} al 299^{p}", in Zeitschrift für Papyrologie und Epigraphik, vol. 17, pp. 278 ff. (1975).
- Paul A. Gallivan, "The Fasti for A.D. 70–96", in Classical Quarterly, vol. 31, pp. 186–220 (1981).
- John C. Traupman, The New College Latin & English Dictionary, Bantam Books, New York (1995).
