= List of ancient Roman speeches =

In ancient Rome, orators could become like celebrities; many were wealthy and well-respected. Public speaking became a popular form of entertainment and was central to Roman politics.

== List ==
This list is in alphabetical order

Name	Translated name	Contents	Orator	Date	References
Ad Caesarem Senem de Re Publica Oratio	Speech on the State, Addressed to Caesar in His Later Years	Sallust discusses Caesar's conquests and wars.	Sallust	46 BCE	
Ad Litis Censorias			Cato the Elder	184 BCE	
M. Tullii Ciceronis Orationes in Catilinam	Marcus Tullius Cicero's Orations against Catiline	Cicero denounces Catiline, who attempted a failed coup against the Roman Republic. (Note: The exact nature of the event is uncertain.)	Cicero	63 BCE	
Cato the Elder's speech directed towards the Seleucid king		Cato addresses the Seleucid King in Athens.	Cato the Elder	Uncertain date	
Cato the Younger's speech during the Catiline conspiracy		Cato the Younger argues for the execution of the Catiline conspirators.	Cato the Younger	63 BCE	
Contra Servium Galbam pro Direptis Lusitanis	Against Servius Galba for the Lusitanian plunders	Cato argues that Rome should treat its defeated enemies with moderation.	Cato the Elder	149 BCE	
De Bello Carthaginiensi		Speech written by Cato calling for a war against Carthage.	Cato the Elder	143 BCE	
De Domo Sua	On his House	Cicero discusses grief and sacrifice	Cicero	57 BCE	
De Falsis Pugnis	On Falsified Battles	Speech written by Cato against general who sought triumphs for territories they had not conquered through war.	Cato the Elder	190 BCE	
Defense speech by Domitius Afer		Domitius Afer provides a defense for Cloatilla	Domitius Afer	Uncertain date	
De Haruspicum Responsis	On the Responses of the Haruspices	Cicero discusses the haruspices.	Cicero	57 BCE	
De Lege Agraria contra Rullum	Opposing the Agrarian Law proposed by Rullus	Cicero argues that a land redistribution bill proposed by Publius Servilius Rullus was of poor quality	Cicero	63 BCE	
De Macedonia Liberanda		Cato argues that Rome should not annex Macedonia as Rome was incapable of properly defending it.	Cato the Elder	167 BCE	
De Pecuni Regis Antiochi		Cato's commentary on potential corruption involved in Scipio's triumph due to his campaign in Africa.	Cato the Elder	Uncertain date	
De Praeda militbus dividenda	On the Division of Spoils amongst Military Men	Speech written by Cato the Elder against for the criminalization of generals who take public land.	Cato the Elder	Uncertain date	
De Provinciis Consularibus	On the Consular Provinces	Cicero discusses his tax policy	Cicero	56 BCE	
De Suis Virtutibus Contra L. Thermum post censuram	Concerning his virtues in Opposition to Thermus	Cato the Elder attacks the moral character of Lucius Minucius Thermus	Cato the Elder	183 BCE	
De Sumpto Suo		Cato's defense against accusations of corruption.	Cato the Elder	164 BCE	
Dierum Dictarum de Consulatu Suo		Speech written by Cato in defense of his war against the Spanish tribes.	Cato the Elder	191-190 BCE	
Dissuasio Legio Junniae De Feneratione		Cato attacks Quintus Minucius Thermus.	Cato the Elder	193 BCE	
Divinatio in Caecilium	Against Quintus Caecilius in the process for selecting a prosecutor of Gaius Verres	Cicero attacks Quintus Caecilius for the prosecutor he chose in the case against Gaius Verres	Cicero	70 BCE	
Gaius Licinius Macer Calvus's speech against Publius Vatinius		Calvus criticized Vatinius for accepting bribes.	Gaius Licinius Macer Calvus	54 BCE	
In M. Tullium Ciceronem Oratio	An Invective against Marcus Tullius	Sallust criticizes Cicero for his politics and character.	Sallust	Uncertain date	
In Pisonem	Against Piso	Cicero attacks Piso and his administration of Macedonia	Cicero	55 BCE	
Interrupted speech by Domitius Afer		One of Domitius Afer's speeches was interrupted by the shouts of the crowd.	Domitus Afer	Uncertain date	
In Toga Candida	Denouncing candidates for the consulship of 63 BC	Cicero argues that his opponents Catilina and Antonius would be inefficient Consuls.	Cicero	64 BCE	
In Vatinium testem	Against the witness Publius Vatinius at the trial of Sestius	Cicero's defense of Publius Vatinius	Cicero	56 BCE	
In Verrem	Against Verres	Series of speeches made by Cicero against Gaius Verres' conduct in Sicily	Cicero	70 BCE	
Laudatio Iuliae amitae		Funeral oration Julius Caesar gave in honor of his aunt Julia.	Julius Caesar	68 BCE	
Mark Antony's eulogy for Caesar		Mark Antony read Caesar's will and listed his accomplishments in an attempt to gain the populace's favor.	Mark Antony	44 BCE (March 19)	
Philippicae		Collection of 14 speeches written by Cicero to denounce Mark Antony.	Cicero	43 BCE	
Post Reditum in Quirites	To the Citizens after his recall from exile	Cicero addresses the citizenry following his exile.	Cicero	57 BCE	
Post Reditum in Senatu	To the Senate after his recall from exile	Cicero addresses the Senate following his exile.	Cicero	57 BCE	
Pro Antonio	In Defense of Gaius Antonius	Cicero's defense of Gaius Antonius	Cicero	59 BCE	
Pro Archia Poeta	In Defense of Aulus Licinius Archias the poet	Cicero's defense of Aulus Licinius Archias	Cicero	62 BCE	
Pro Balbo	In Defense of Lucius Cornelius Balbus	Cicero's defense of Lucius Cornelius Balbus	Cicero	56 BCE	
Pro Caecina	On behalf of Caecina	Cicero's defense of Caecina	Cicero	69 BCE	
Pro Marco Caelio	In Defense of Marcus Caelius Rufus	Cicero's defense of Marcus Caelius Rufus	Cicero	56 BCE	
Pro Aulo Cluentio Habito	On behalf of Aulus Cluentius Habito	Cicero's defense of Aulus Cluentius Habito, who was accused of poisoning Oppianicus the elder	Cicero	56 BCE	
Pro Flacco	In Defense of Lucius Valerius Flaccus	Cicero's defense of Lucius Valerius Flaccus	Cicero	59 BCE	
Pro Fonteio	On behalf of Marcus Fonteius	Cicero's defense of Marcus Fonteius	Cicero	69 BCE	
Pro Ligario	On behalf of Ligarius before Caesar	Cicero's defense of Ligarius	Cicero	46 BCE	
Pro Lege Manilia or De Imperio Cn. Pompei	In favor of the Lex Manilia, or On the command of Pompey	Cicero argues for the Lex Manilia	Cicero	66 BCE	
Pro Tullio	On behalf of Tullius	Cicero's defense of his client Marcus Tullius in a property dispute	Cicero	57 BCE	
Pro Rhodiensibus, Contra Servium Galbam	On Behalf of the Rhodians and Against Galba	It argues against a call for a war against Rhodes after the Third Macedonian War.	Cato the Elder	167 BCE	
Pro Rege Deiotaro	On behalf of King Deiotarus before Caesar	Cicero's defense of Deiotarus	Cicero	46 BCE	
Pro Roscio Amerino	In defence of Sextus Roscius of Ameria	Cicero's speech in defense of Sextus Roscius, accused of murdering his own father	Cicero	80 BCE	
Pro Marcello	On behalf of Marcellus	Cicero's defense of Marcellus	Cicero	46 BCE	
Pro Milone	In Defence of Titus Annius Milo	Cicero's defense of Titus Milo, who was accused of murdering Clodius.	Cicero	52 BCE	
Pro Murena	In Defense of Lucius Licinius Murena	Cicero's defense of Lucius Licinius Murena	Cicero	63 BCE	
Pro Plancio	In Defense of Gnaeus Plancius	Cicero's defense of Gnaeus Plancius	Cicero	54 BCE	
Pro Q. Roscio Comoedo	In Defense of Quintus Roscius Gallus the Comic actor	Cicero's defense of Quintus Roscius Gallus, a comic actor	Cicero	77 BCE	
Pro Quinctio	On behalf of Publius Quinctius	Cicero's speech in defense of his client Publius Quinctius	Cicero	81 BCE	
Pro Rabirio Perduellionis Reo	On behalf of Gaius Rabirius, accused of treason	Cicero's defense of Gaius Rabirius	Cicero	63 BCE	
Pro Rabirio Postumo	In Defense of Gaius Rabirius Postumus	Cicero's defense of Gaius Rabirius Postumus	Cicero	54 BCE	
Pro Scauro	In Defense of Marcus Aemilius Scaurus	Cicero's defense of Marcus Aemilius Scaurus	Cicero	54 BCE	
Pro Sestio	In Defense of Publius Sestius	Cicero's defense of Publius Sestius	Cicero	56 BCE	
Pro Sulla	In Defense of Publius Cornelius Sulla	Cicero's defense of Publius Cornelius Sulla	Cicero	72 or 71 BCE	
Pro Voluseno Catulo	Concerning Lucius Volusenus Catulus	Domitius Afer, Passienus Crispus, and Decimus Laelius Balbus defend Catulus in a trial	Decimus Laelius	Reign of Claudius	
P. Vatinium testem interrogatio		Cicero critiqued the character of Publius Vatinius	Cicero	56 BCE	
Uti praeda in publicum referatur	That the spoils of war should be given back to the public	Speech written by Cato arguing that religious works should be publicly available and not held in private collections.	Cato the Elder	Uncertain date	
Speech by Gaius Calpurnius Piso against Domitius Afer		Piso attacked Domitius Afer's character.	Gaius Calpurnius Piso	Uncertain date	
Speeches by Gaius Septimius Severus Aper against poets		Aper critiques Maternus.	Aper	Uncertain date	
Speech by Julius Africanus		Julius Africanus made a purposefully long speech during a trial.	Julius Africanus	Uncertain date	
Speech by Maternus responding to Aper's critique		Maternus responded to Aper's speech criticizing him.	Maternus	Uncertain date	
Speech spoken by Quintus Hortensius		Quintus Hortensius praises his successful military defense of Nicomedes IV of Bithynia	Quintus Hortensius	133 BCE	
Si se M. Caelius Tribunnus Appellasset			Cato the Elder	184 BCE	
	On the Improper Election of the Aediles	Collection of speeches written by Cato, all of which were made during his Consulship.	Cato	202 BCE	
	On His Consulship	Cicero's retrospect on his Consulship and several speeches he made whilst Censor.	Cicero	202 BCE	

== See also ==
- List of speeches
- List of Latin phrases (full)
- Orator
