= Publius Cornelius Dolabella (consul 55) =

Roman senator active during the reign of Nero

Publius Cornelius Dolabella was a Roman senator, who was active during the reign of Nero. He was suffect consul in the nundinium of May to June 55 as the colleague of Seneca the Younger.

A member of the patrician order, he is likely the son of Publius Cornelius Dolabella, consul in 10; it is also likely he was the father of Servius Cornelius Dolabella Petronianus, consul in 86.

Political offices
Preceded by Numerius Cestius, and Lucius Antistius Vetus as Suffect consuls	Suffect consul of the Roman Empire; 55 with Lucius Annaeus Seneca	Succeeded by Gn. Cornelius Lentulus Gaetulicus, and Titus Curtilius Mancia as Suffect consuls
