= Marcus Trebellius Maximus =

1st century AD Roman senator and provincial governor

- Roman lead pig Ingot found in the Wrexham County Borough inscribed with the name Trebellius Maximus

Suffect Consul of the Roman Empire
- In office c. May 55 AD – c. June 55 AD
- Preceded by: Publius Cornelius Dolabella; Lucius Anbaues Seneca the Younger
- Succeeded by: T. (or P.?) Palfuriu

Governor of Roman Britain
- In office c. 43 AD – c. 69 AD
- Preceded by: Publius Petronius Turpilianus
- Succeeded by: Marcus Vettius Bolanus

Personal details
- Born: c. 1st century AD
- Died: c. 1st century AD
- Occupation: Ancient Roman politician

Marcus Trebellius Maximus was a Roman senator active during the reign of Nero. He was suffect consul for the nundinium of May to June 55 AD as the colleague of Seneca the Younger, replacing Publius Cornelius Dolabella.

In 61 AD, Trebellius served on a commission to revise the census list and tax assessments in Gaul, together with Quintus Volusius Saturninus and Titus Sextius Africanus. Saturninus and Africanus were rivals, and both hated Trebellius, who took advantage of their rivalry to get the better of them. In 63 AD, he was appointed governor of Britain. He continued the policy of consolidation followed by his immediate predecessor, and conquered no new territory. He continued the Romanisation of Britain, refounding Camulodunum after the rebellion of Boudica destroyed it. Londinium grew in mercantile wealth under his rule.

By 67 AD, the province was secure enough to allow Legio XIV Gemina to be withdrawn, but inactivity, and the lack of opportunities for booty, led to mutinies among the legions that remained. Not being a military man, Trebellius was unable to restore discipline, and a feud with Marcus Roscius Coelius, commander of XX Valeria Victrix, further undermined his authority.

In 69 AD, the Year of the Four Emperors, Britain did not forward its own candidate to replace Nero as other regions had done. Instead, Roscius led a mutiny which forced Trebellius to flee, and threw his weight behind Vitellius, sending units from Legio XX to fight for him. Once Vitellius had gained the empire he appointed a new governor, Marcus Vettius Bolanus. Vitellius also returned Legio XIV, which had sided with his defeated opponent Otho, to Britain.

== Lead ingot ==
Illustration of the ingot inscription

In 2019, Rob Jones, a metal detectorist, discovered a large lead object with an inscription in the Wrexham County Borough, and alerted his local finds liaison officer for the Portable Antiquities Scheme. The ingot, measuring 53cm by 16cm by 11cm and weighing 63.4kg, was excavated by archaeologists from Wrexham Museum and the Clwyd-Powys Archaeological Trust. The ingot has the only known inscription found in the United Kingdom to contain the name of Marcus Trebellius Maximus.

Inscription:

[...] CAES ^ AVG ^ BR͡IT ^ X ṂAGVL ^ F̣VSVM ^ OP I͡N ^ P͡ROV ^ T͡R͡EB͡E͡L ^ MAXIMO ^ LEG ^ AVG
[Neronis] Caes(aris) Aug(usti) (plumbum) Brit(annicum) (e)x Magul(...) fusum op(eribus) in prov(incia) Trebel(lio) Maximo leg(ato) Aug(usti)
(Property of Nero) Caesar Augustus, British (lead) from Magul(...), smelted at the works in the province when Trebellius Maximus was imperial legate

Political offices
Preceded by Publius Cornelius Dolabella as Suffect consul	Consul of the Roman Empire; 55 with Lucius Annaeus Seneca	Succeeded by Publius Palfurius as Suffect consul
Preceded by Publius Petronius Turpilianus	Governor of Roman Britain; 63-69	Succeeded by Marcus Vettius Bolanus
