= Curvia gens =

Ancient Roman gens

The gens Curvia was a minor Roman gens, best known for being among the ancestors of Marcus Aurelius.

== Members ==
- Curvia, a woman described on an epitaph from the site of modern Morte-Merie, Uzer, Ardèche, France.
- Curvia Fabia (or Fabia Curvia), a woman mentioned in an inscription from an insula at Pompeii.
- Domitia Lucilla, perhaps originally Curvia Lucilla, was the daughter of Lucanus, and the mother of Domitia Lucilla the Younger, by whom she was the grandmother of Marcus Aurelius.
- Curvius Marcellus, owned a domus in Pompeii with his wife Fabia.
- Sextus Curvius Silvinus, quaestor during the reigns of Augustus or Tiberius.
- Gnaeus Domitius Tullus, (Note: After their adoption, the brothers' full names were Gnaeus Domitius Afer Titius Marcellus Curvius Tullus and Gnaeus Domitius Afer Titius Marcellus Curvius Lucanus.) son of Curvius Tullus, along with his brother was adopted by their father's friend, Domitius Afer, before the two men became hostile.
- Gnaeus Domitius Lucanus, the son of Curvius Tullus, he and his brother were adopted by their father's friend, Domitius Afer, before the two men fell out.
- Sextus Curvius Tullus, the son of Silvinus, was a close friend of the lawyer Gnaeus Domitius Afer, but they had a falling out
- Curvia Urbana, a woman named in an inscription from Gallia Narbonensis.

== See also ==
- List of Roman gentes
- Curtia gens

== Sources ==
- Adriano: architettura e progetto (in Italian). Electa. 2000 – via Hadrian's Villa (Tivoli, Italy)/Villa Adriana (Tívoli).
- Lindsay, Hugh (2009). Adoption in the Roman world. Cambridge: Cambridge University Press. ISBN 978-0-511-65821-1. OCLC 647846259.
- Dupraz, Joëlle; Fraisse, Christel (2001). L'Ardèche (in French). Académie des inscriptions et belles-lettres, Ministère de l'éducation nationale, Ministère de la recherche, Ministère de la culture et de la communication, Maison des sciences de l'homme.
- D'Avino, Michele (1967). The Women of Pompeii. Loffredo.
- D'Avino, Michele (1964). La donna a Pompei (in Italian). Loffredo.
- Della Corte, Matteo (1954). Case ed abitanti di Pompei (in Italian). Presso l'autore.
