= Lucius Antistius Vetus (consul 55) =

1st century Roman senator and consul

Lucius Antistius Vetus (died AD 65) was a Roman senator who lived during the Principate. He was consul for the year 55 as the colleague of the emperor Nero.

He is thought to be the son of Gaius Antistius Vetus, consul in 23, and the brother of Gaius Antistius Vetus, consul in 50; Paul von Rohden speculates Vetus might be identical with the L. Antistius C. f. Aem(ilia) Vetus augur mentioned in the inscription CIL XIV, 2849. His daughter Antistia Politta married the senator Rubellius Plautus.

Immediately after his consulate, Vetus was appointed governor of Germania Superior, where he attempted construction of a canal that would join the Rhine and Rhone rivers and facilitate traffic. He was replaced in this position in the year 56 by Titus Curtilius Mancia. The sortition awarded him governorship of Asia for 64/65; during that time, he had Claudius Demianus imprisoned for serious crimes.

However, in the year 65 Vetus gained the enmity of the emperor Nero. Tacitus claims it was because he was the father-in-law of Rubellius Plautus, whom Nero had executed several years before, although Vetus was also accused of wrongdoing by his freedman Fortunatus and Claudius Demianus; Nero had released Demianus in return for his accusations against Vetus. After Vetus retired to his estate at Formiae, his daughter Politta sought to plead his case before the emperor, but as she was forbidden to approach him, according to Tacitus "she would haunt his doors and implore him to hear an innocent man." Nevertheless, Nero ignored her and she returned to her father with news of his impending judgment of the Senate. Vetus then manumitted his slaves, giving them all his ready money and ordered each to take of his possessions whatever they could carry, and with his daughter and mother-in-law Sextia, the three committed suicide.

Political offices
Preceded by Marcus Aefulanus, and ignotus as Suffect consuls	Consul of the Roman Empire; 55 with Nero, followed by Numerius Cestius	Succeeded by Publius Cornelius Dolabella, and Seneca the Younger as Suffect consul
