= Gaius Fonteius Capito (consul 59) =

1st century AD Roman senator and consul

Gaius Fonteius Capito was a Roman senator, who was active during the Principate. He was consul in the year 59 as the colleague of Gaius Vipstanus Apronianus.

Capito came from a plebeian family whose members had reached the rank of praetor since the 2nd century BC, but none had achieved the consulate until the end of the republic in 33 BC, when Gaius Fonteius Capito acceded to that magistracy. According to Cicero, the Fonteii came from Tusculum. Capito was probably the son or grandson of the eponymous consul of the year 12; his brother Fonteius Capito was one of the consuls of the year 67.

== See also ==
- Fonteia gens

Political offices
Preceded by Aulus Petronius Lurco; Aulus Paconius Sabinus as suffecti	Roman consul 59 with Gaius Vipstanus Apronianus	Succeeded by Titus Sextius Africanus; Marcus Ostorius Scapula as suffecti
