= Cestius =

Cestius may refer to:

- Male members of the Cestia gens, an ancient Roman family
- Pons Cestius, a stone bridge over the river Tiber in Rome
- Pyramid of Cestius, a small pyramid in Rome
