= Gaius Fonteius Agrippa =

Gaius Fonteius Agrippa was the name of two related people in Roman history:

- Gaius Fonteius Agrippa was one of the four accusers of Marcus Scribonius Libo in 16 AD. Agrippa profited financially from the accusation, as he was rewarded with a share of Libo's property after the man committed suicide. As a result of this prosecution, he was also made praetor in 17 AD. He is again mentioned in 19 AD, as offering his daughter for a vestal virgin, in competition with the daughter of Domitius Pollio, to replace Occia who had recently died. As Agrippa had been recently divorced, Pollio's daughter won the honor. Even still, as a consolation the emperor Tiberius gave Agrippa's daughter a million sestertii for her dowry.
- Gaius Fonteius Agrippa, probably the son of the preceding, was suffect consul in 58 AD. In 69 AD, he succeeded Marcus Aponius Saturninus as proconsular governor of the Roman province of Asia. He was recalled from that place by Vespasian, and placed over Moesia in 70 AD. He was shortly afterwards killed in battle by the Sarmatians. He was succeeded in Moesia by Rubrius Gallus.

== See also ==
- Agrippa (disambiguation)

Political offices
Preceded by Nero III, and Marcus Valerius Messalla Corvinus as Ordinary consuls	Suffect consul of the Roman Empire; 58 with Marcus Valerius Messala Corvinus	Succeeded by Aulus Petronius Lurco, and Aulus Paconius Sabinus as Suffect consuls
