= Augustan literature (ancient Rome) =

Period in Latin literature

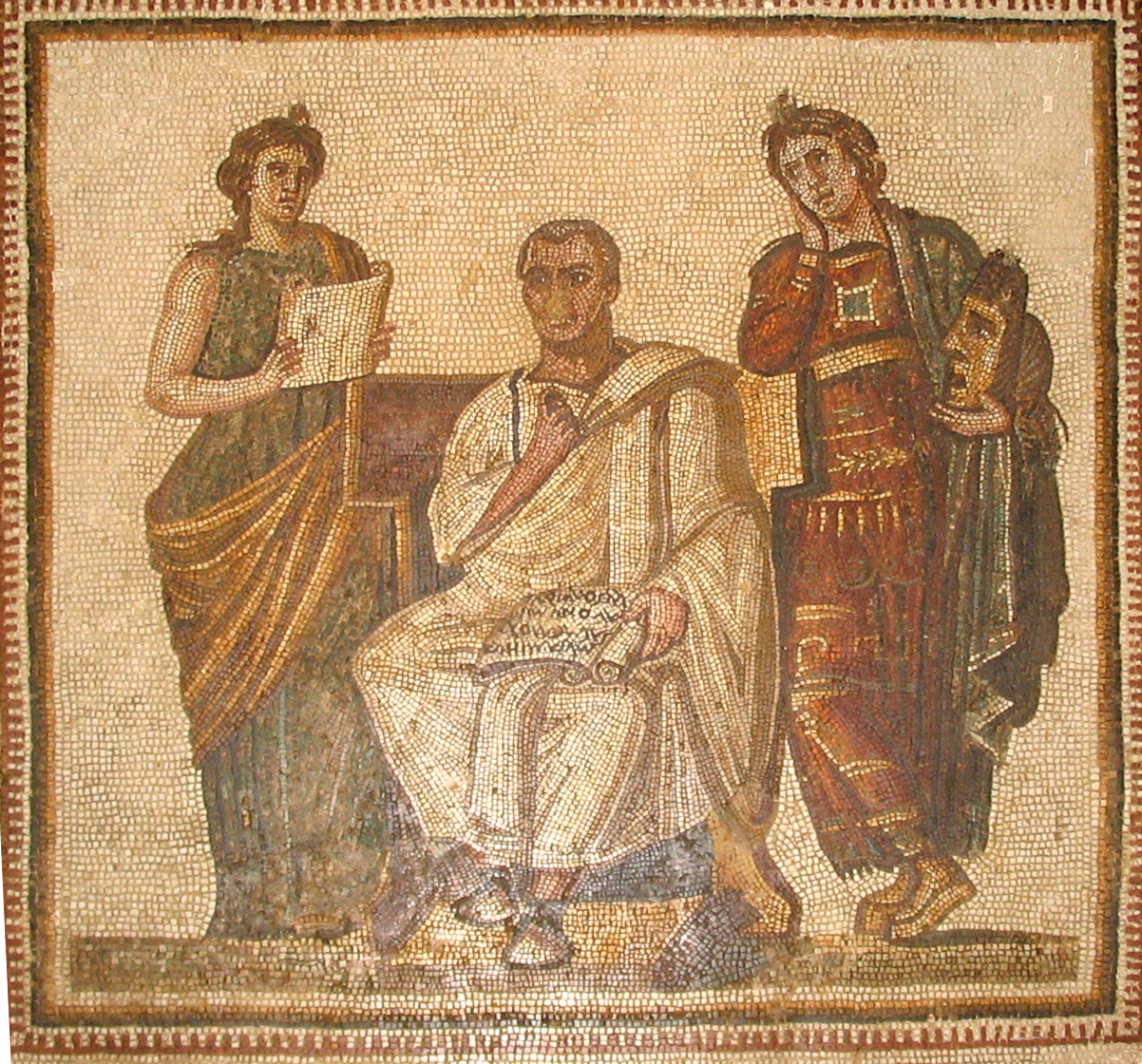
The Augustan poet Vergil in a 3rd-century mosaic also depicting the Muses Clio and Melpomene.

Augustan literature is a period of Latin literature written during the reign of Augustus (27 BC–AD 14), the first Roman emperor. In literary histories of the first part of the 20th century and earlier, Augustan literature was regarded along with that of the Late Republic as constituting the Golden Age of Latin literature, a period of stylistic classicism.

Most of the literature periodized as "Augustan" was in fact written by men—Vergil, Horace, Propertius, Livy—whose careers were established during the triumviral years, before Octavian assumed the title Augustus. Strictly speaking, Ovid is the poet whose work is most thoroughly embedded in the Augustan regime.

== Impact and style ==
Augustan literature produced the most widely read, influential, and enduring of Rome's poets. The Republican poets Catullus and Lucretius are their immediate predecessors; Lucan, Martial, Juvenal and Statius are their so-called "Silver Age" heirs. Although Vergil has sometimes been considered a "court poet", his Aeneid, the most important of the Latin epics, also permits complex readings on the source and meaning of Rome's power and the responsibilities of a good leader.

Ovid's works were wildly popular, but the poet was exiled by Augustus in one of literary history's great mysteries; carmen et error ("a poem and a mistake") is Ovid's own oblique explanation. Among prose works, the monumental history of Livy is preeminent for both its scope and stylistic achievement. The multi-volume work De architectura by Vitruvius also remains of great informational interest.

Questions pertaining to tone, or the writer's attitude toward his subject matter, are acute among the preoccupations of scholars who study the period. In particular, Augustan works are analyzed in an effort to understand the extent to which they advance, support, criticize or undermine social and political attitudes promulgated by the regime, official forms of which were often expressed in aesthetic media.

== List of Augustan writers ==
- Publius Vergilius Maro (Virgil, spelled also as Vergil) (70 – 19 BC),
- Quintus Horatius Flaccus (Horace) (65 – 8 BC), known for lyric poetry and satires
- Sextus Aurelius Propertius (50 – 15 BC), poet
- Albius Tibullus (54 – 19 BC), elegiac poet
- Titus Livius (Livy) (64 BC – 12 AD), historian
- Publius Ovidius Naso (Ovid) (43 BC – 18 AD), poet
- Grattius Faliscus (a contemporary of Ovid), poet
- Marcus Manilius (1st century BC & AD), astrologer, poet
- Gaius Julius Hyginus (64 BC – 17 AD), librarian, poet, mythographer
- Marcus Verrius Flaccus (55 BC – 20 AD), grammarian, philologist, calendarist
- Marcus Vitruvius Pollio (80 70 BC – after 15 BC), engineer, architect
- Marcus Antistius Labeo (d. 10 or 11 AD), jurist, philologist
- Lucius Cestius Pius (1st century BC & AD), Latin educator
- Gnaeus Pompeius Trogus (1st century BC), historian, naturalist
- Marcus Porcius Latro (1st century BC), rhetorician
- Gaius Valgius Rufus (consul 12 BC), poet
- Sulpicia, elegiac poet
