= Aulus Petronius Lurco =

1st century Roman senator and consul

Aulus Petronius Lurco was a Roman senator, who was active during the Principate. He was suffect consul in the nundinium for the second half of the year 58 AD with Aulus Paconius Sabinus as his colleague. He is known entirely from inscriptions.

It is known that Lurco was one of the Arval Brethren. A "M. Petronius Lurco" is mentioned as one of the three curatores tabulariorum publicorum, along with Gaius Calpetanus Rantius Sedatus and Titus Satrius Decianus; this Petronius Lurco may be a brother of the consul of 58. Yet because the inscription that attests to this is known from a transcription in the Einsiedeln Itinerary, which has errors, it is also possible the initial should be an "A." and Petronius Lurco is identical to the consul.

Political offices
Preceded by Gaius Fonteius Agrippa, and Marcus Valerius Messalla Corvinus	Suffect consul of the Roman Empire; 58 with Aulus Paconius Sabinus	Succeeded by Gaius Vipstanus Apronianus, and Gaius Fonteius Capito as ordinary consuls
