= Marcus Valerius Messalla Corvinus (consul 58) =

Consul of the Roman Empire
- In office January 58 – June 58 Serving with Nero (January to April), Gaius Fonteius Agrippa (May to June)

Personal details
- Parent(s): Possibly Marcus Aurelius Cotta Maximus Messalinus or Marcus Valerius Messalla Barbatus and Domitia Lepida the Younger
- Relatives: Possibly the brother of Valeria Messalina
- Known for: Member of the Arval Brethren

Marcus Valerius Messalla Corvinus was a Roman Senator who lived in the Roman Empire in the 1st century. He might have been the brother of empress Messalina.

== Biography ==
=== Early life ===
Corvinus was a member of the Republican gens Valeria. Corvinus was the namesake of the Senator and Augustan literary patron Marcus Valerius Messalla Corvinus. He may have been a son of the Senator and consul Marcus Aurelius Cotta Maximus Messalinus, who was a son of Marcus Valerius Messalla Corvinus, or possibly the son of the consul Marcus Valerius Messalla Barbatus and Domitia Lepida the Younger, thus making him the brother of Valeria Messalina, the third wife of the emperor Claudius.

=== Political career ===
In 46/47AD, Corvinus was a member of the Arval Brethren. From January to April in 58AD, he served as an ordinary consul with the emperor Nero and then from May to June in 58AD, as a suffect consul with Gaius Fonteius Agrippa. Starting with his consulship, he was granted an annual half a million sesterces to maintain his senatorial qualifications.

== Sources ==
- Tacitus, Annals of Imperial Rome
- D. Shotter, Nero (Google eBook) Routledge, 2012
- Lucan, Civil War (Google eBook), Penguin, 2012
- Velleius Paterculus – Translated with Introduction and Notes by J.C. Yardley & A.A. Barrett, The Roman History, Hackett Publishing, 2011
- Biographischer Index der Antike (Google eBook), Walter de Gruyter, 2001

Political offices
Preceded by Nero II, and Lucius Caesius Martialis as Suffect consuls	Consul of the Roman Empire; 58 with Nero III, followed by Gaius Fonteius Agrippa	Succeeded by Aulus Petronius Lurco, and Aulus Paconius Sabinus as Suffect consuls
