= Cossus Cornelius Lentulus (consul 60) =

1st century Roman senator and consul

Cossus Cornelius Lentulus was a Roman senator who flourished during the Principate. He was the consul posterior as the colleague of the emperor Nero in AD 60.

Lentulus belonged to a branch of the Cornelii that had suffered under Nero's predecessors, and "might be expected to harbor resentment against the dynasty". His uncle Gnaeus Cornelius Lentulus Gaetulicus, consul 26, had been executed for his role in a failed attempt to overthrow Caligula. Although his cousin Gnaeus Cornelius Lentulus Gaetulicus was suffect consul in 55, Lentulus was the first member of his family in over 30 years to be ordinary consul, an even higher honor. Judith Ginsburg argues his appointment as Nero's colleague was part of a policy to conciliate favor with hostile factions of the Senate, especially members of patrician families.

Political offices
| Preceded by T. Sextius Africanus; M. Ostorius Scapula as suffecti | Consul of the Roman Empire; 60 with Nero IV | Succeeded by G. Velleius Paterculus; M. Manilius Vopiscus as suffecti |
