= Curtilia gens =

The gens Curtilia was a minor plebeian family at ancient Rome. Few members of this gens appear in history, but others are known from inscriptions.

== Members ==
- Curtilius, a former partisan of Caesar, mentioned by Cicero in 43 BC as possessing an estate that had belonged to Gaius Sextilius Rufus at Fundi.
- Titus Curtilius Mancia, consul suffectus in AD 55; as legate of the army on the upper Rhine during the reign of Nero, he assisted Dubius Avitus, praefectus of Germania Inferior, in putting down the league of the Tencteri, Bructeri, and Ampsivarii, from AD 56 to 59.
- Curtilia, the daughter of Mancia, married Gnaeus Domitius Lucanus.

== See also ==
- List of Roman gentes

== Bibliography ==
- Marcus Tullius Cicero, Epistulae ad Atticum.
- Publius Cornelius Tacitus, Annales.
- Paul von Rohden, Elimar Klebs, & Hermann Dessau, Prosopographia Imperii Romani (The Prosopography of the Roman Empire, abbreviated PIR), Berlin (1898).
