= Gaius Vipstanus Apronianus =

1st century Roman senator and provincial governor

Gaius Vipstanus Apronianus (died 91) was a Roman Senator who was consul ordinarius in AD 59 with Gaius Fonteius Capito as his colleague. Apronianus was afterwards proconsular governor of Africa; he was also a member of the Arval Brethren.

The cognomen Apronianus poses uncertainty. In the words of Ronald Syme, his name indicates he was "either an Apronius adopted by a Lucius Vipstanus, or a Vipstanus whose father had married an Apronia", then implies the woman's father could have been the consul of 39, Lucius Apronius Caesianus. His further relationship to other Vipstani is unknown.

Apronianus was co-opted into the Arval Brethren in 57; he remained a member of the religious college until his death 34 years later, which made him one of the longest-serving members of the Brethren.

Political offices
| Preceded by A. Petronius Lurco; A. Paconius Sabinus | Consul of the Roman Empire; January–June 59 with Gaius Fonteius Capito | Succeeded by T. Sextius Africanus; M. Ostorius Scapula |
