= Titus Curtilius Mancia =

1st century AD Roman senator and consul

Titus Curtilius Mancia was a Roman senator, who held several offices in the emperor's service during the middle of the first century. He was suffect consul in the nundinium of November to December 55 as the colleague of Gnaeus Cornelius Lentulus Gaetulicus. No other senator with his gentilicium is known, so Mancia seems to have been a homo novus.

His origins are not known for sure; however, there are several indications that he came from Gallia Narbonensis. At this time several senators came from this province, probably due to the influence of Nero's advisor, Sextus Afranius Burrus. In addition, his daughter married Gnaeus Domitius Lucanus, a member of the Narbonensian aristocracy. His granddaughter, Domitia Lucilla Major, was, through her eponymous daughter, grandmother of the emperor Marcus Aurelius.

== Life ==
Details of Mancia's life are known only after his consulate. According to the ancient writer Phlegon of Tralles he was governor of the imperial province of Germania Superior by the year 56 as the successor of Lucius Antistius Vetus. He still held this office in the year 58, for Tacitus attests that his colleague in Germania Inferior, Lucius Duvius Avitus, asked him this year for military support for the campaign against the Ampsivarii. Mancia appears to have agreed to Duvius' request and campaigned with an army beyond the Rhine. It is not known when Mancia resigned the governorship; he possibly remained in Germania Superior until the appointment of Publius Sulpicius Scribonius Proculus, in the year 63.

Several ancient inscriptions attest to the Lex Manciana, a law on the administration of state and imperial land ownership in the province of Africa. Various scholars have assumed from its name that Titus Curtilius Mancia enacted it. In turn, they have argued that he had been either governor or extraordinary legate of the emperor in that province, either during the reign of Nero or the Flavian dynasty. Ultimately, however, it is not certain whether Mancia is connected to the law, nor whether it was created at all during his lifetime.

Pliny the Younger reports in one of his letters that Mancia disliked his son-in-law, Domitius Lucanus. For this reason, he left his inheritance to his granddaughter on the condition that Lucanus release her from his power as paterfamilias; this would prevent Lucanus from benefiting from the inheritance. This Lucanus did, only to have his brother Gnaeus Domitius Tullus adopt her, allowing both brothers to benefit from her inheritance.

Political offices
Preceded by Publius Palfurius, and Lucius Annaeus Seneca as suffect consuls	Suffect consul of the Roman Empire; 55 with Gnaeus Cornelius Lentulus Gaetulicus	Succeeded by Quintus Volusius Saturninus, and Publius Cornelius (Lentulus?) Scipio as ordinary consuls
