= Marcus Nonius Mucianus =

2nd century Roman senator and consul

Marcus Nonius Mucianus was a Roman senator who was active in the second century. He was suffect consul in the nundinium of October-December 138 as the colleague of Publius Cassius Secundus.

There is confusion in the secondary literature about the proper form of his name. In one inscription, referring to the military tribune of Legio X Fretensis, the name Marcus Nonius Mucianus M.f. Pob. Mucianus Publius Delphius Peregrinus appears. In another, referring to the suffect consul of 138, the name Publius Delphius Peregrinus Alfius Allenius Maximus Curtius Valerianus Proculus Marcus Nonius Mucianus appears. This problem is discussed by Olli Salomies. While admitting that "there is no compelling reason for the identification", he concedes that "all scholars agree in regarding the men as identical." Salomies then attempts to explain the name in accordance with known rules of Roman naming practice. He proposes that Mucianus was the son of a Marcus Nonius -- "from Verona but related to the Nonii of Brixia" -- and a Delphia P.f.; she was the daughter of a Publius Delphius Peregrinus and of a Delphia who was the sister of a Publius Delphius Peregrinus Alfius Alennius Maximus Curtius Valerianus Proculus. Now, according to Salomies, our subject was originally named Marcus Nonius Mucianus Publius Delphius Peregrinus, the items he inherited from his mother added to the end of his name. Between his tenure as legate or assistant to the governor of Asia and his consulship, he was adopted by his maternal uncle and accordingly put the adoptive elements -- e.g., Publius Delphius Peregrinus Alfius Alennius, etc. -- at the beginning of his name, simultaneously dropping it from the end.

Alföldy states Mucianus has his origins in Verona, where two other senators of the same tribe have been attested. Salomies proposes one of them -- Publius Alfius Alennius Maximus Curtius Valerianus, the son of Curtia C.f. Procilla -- was Mucianus' relative.

Edward Dabrowa has reconstructed Mucianus' cursus honorum from at least two inscriptions. His first recorded office was as military tribune of Legio X Fretensis, during the reign of Hadrian. This was followed by the traditional order of republican magistracies: quaestor, aedile, and praetor. Then he was legate to the proconsular governor of Asia. Since Dabrowa wrote, a military diploma was recovered that attests Mucianus was governor of the imperial province of Pannonia Inferior on 19 May 135. Mucianus' career after he achieved the consulship is unknown.

Political offices
Preceded by M. Vindius Verus; P. Pactumeius Clemens as suffecti	Suffect consul of the Roman Empire; October–December 138 with Publius Cassius Secundus	Succeeded by Antoninus Pius II; G. Bruttius Praesens L. Fulvius Rusticus II
