= Publius Pactumeius Clemens =

Roman senator and suffect consul in 138

Publius Pactumeius Clemens was a Roman senator and jurisconsult active during the second century AD. He was suffect consul for the nundinium April-June 138 as the colleague of Marcus Vindius Verus; according to Ronald Syme, Clemens is the earliest known consul to hold the fasces in absentia. Although he is known mostly through inscriptions, his life provides examples of how patronage operated during contemporary Rome.

The origins of the family of Clemens was in Cirta, located in modern Algeria. Olli Salomies, in his monograph on the naming practices of the Early Roman empire, provides Clemens' full name and filiation -- "P. Pactumeius P. f. Quir. Clemens"; this indicates his father's praenomen was also Publius. His paternal grandfather was Quintus Aurelius Pactumeius Clemens, suffect consul around the year 80.

== Life ==
His cursus honorum as far as his consulship has been preserved in an inscription found in Cirta, honoring his agreement to become patron of that city. It is notable for consisting only of civil positions, and excluding military ones, such as military tribune or command of a legion, which his contemporary from Cirta, Publius Julius Geminius Marcianus, held. Clemens began his public career in the decemviri stlitibus judicandis, one of the four boards that comprise the vigintiviri; this board of ten was tasked with maintaining the city roads of Rome. His next documented office was as quaestor. This inscription then records that Clemens was legatus or assistant to his father-in-law Titus Prifernius Geminus during the latter's year governing the public province of Achaea (122/123); after his consulate, he was legatus for his father-in-law a second time, this time when Geminus was governor of Asia.

Clemens returned to Rome, where he held the Republican office of plebeian tribune; following this he was assigned as curator to the Greek cities of Athens, Thespis, Plataea; then at a later date for the cities of Thessaly. The finances of many cities during this period had fallen into disarray, and the emperors Trajan and Hadrian were forced to appoint special magistrates to reorganize them. Once again in Rome, he was urban praetor around the year 127. These responsibilities had accrued to Clemens a degree of prominence in the "Cirtan community at Rome" Edward Champlin infers existed there; other members of this community included Quintus Lollius Urbicus, consul in either 135 or 136; Gaius Arrius Antoninus, consul around the year 170; and the rhetorician Fronto. Champlin notes that Lollius Urbicus and Pactumeius Clemens themselves "could provide powerful support for Cirtan interests, and such support is attested by strong circumstantial evidence."

Following this he was appointed by Hadrian ad rationes civitatium putandas in Syria; Champlin suggests he gained this appointment through the intervention of Marcus Claudius Restitutus, the first known procurator from Cirta. This was followed by a similar appointment to the imperial province of Cilicia, then becoming governor of that province; Werner Eck dates the period of this governorship from around 136 to around 139. While governor, Clemens was appointed suffect consul.

Information about Clemens' life ends with his consulship; the date of his death is unknown. His relationship to Titus Pactumeius Magnus, suffect consul in 183, is unknown.

Political offices
Preceded by Kanus Junius Niger, and Gaius Pomponius Camerinus as ordinary consuls	Suffect consul of the Roman Empire; 138 with Marcus Vindius Verus	Succeeded by Publius Cassius Secundus, and Marcus Nonius Mucianus as suffect consuls
