= Marcus Ostorius Scapula (consul 59) =

1st century Roman soldier, senator and consul

Marcus Ostorius Scapula (died AD 65) was a Roman senator, who was active during the Principate. He was suffect consul in the second half of the year 59 as the colleague of Titus Sextius Africanus. He was the son of Publius Ostorius Scapula, governor of Roman Britain (47-52).

Scapula first appears in history as a soldier in one of the units stationed in his father's province of Roman Britain. During a battle against the Iceni, the younger Ostorius Scapula saved a fellow soldier's life and was afterwards awarded the civic crown. It is possible he had been commissioned a military tribune; in any case, his career after this point until he achieved the consulate is unknown. In 62, Scapula was involved in a legal suit where the praetor Antistius Sosianus was accused of violating the lex maiestas by composing verses mocking Nero which Sosianus recited at a large gathering at Scapula's house. Although Scapula claimed he had heard nothing, several witnesses present at the time were produced who attested Sosianus had recited the verses, and the accused was found guilty and punished with exile.

When Sosianus was recalled from exile three years later, according to Tacitus, he learned that the occupation of delator, or informer, was favored by the emperor Nero, and Sosianus accused Scapula of seeking to make himself emperor. Nero readily believed him. At the time Scapula was living on a remote estate on the Ligurian border, whence a centurion was dispatched to ensure Scapula's death. Thus pressured, Ostorius Scapula killed himself.

Political offices
Preceded by Gaius Vipstanus Apronianus, and Gaius Fonteius Capito	Suffect consul of the Roman Empire; 59 with Titus Sextius Africanus	Succeeded by Nero IV, and Cossus Cornelius Lentulus
