= Publius Cornelius Scipio (consul 56) =

1st century Roman senator and consul

Publius Cornelius Scipio was a Roman senator, who was active during the Principate. He was consul for the year 56 as the colleague of Quintus Volusius Saturninus. As he belongs to the family of the Cornelii Lentuli, one of the patrician branches of the Cornelii, his name may be Publius Cornelius Lentulus Scipio.

Scipio was the son of Publius Cornelius Lentulus Scipio, suffect consul in 24, by his first wife, whose name has not yet been recovered. Publius Cornelius Scipio Asiaticus, suffect consul in 68, is known to have been his younger half-brother.

Political offices
Preceded by Gnaeus Cornelius Lentulus Gaetulicus, and Titus Curtilius Mancia as suffect consuls	Suffect consul of the Roman Empire; 56 with Quintus Volusius Saturninus	Succeeded by Lucius Junius Gallio Annaeanus, and Titus Cutius Ciltus as suffect consuls
