= Clodius Aesopus =

1st-century BC Roman actor

Clodius (or Claudius) Aesopus was the most celebrated tragic actor of Ancient Rome in time of Cicero, that is, the 1st century BC, but the dates of his birth and death are not known. His name seems to show that he was a freedman of some member of the Clodian gens.

Cicero was on friendly terms with both Aesopus and Roscius, the equally distinguished comic actor, and did not disdain to profit by their instruction. Plutarch mentions it as reported of Aesopus, that, while representing Atreus deliberating how he should revenge himself on Thyestes, the actor forgot himself so far in the heat of action that with his truncheon he struck and killed one of the servants crossing the stage.

Horace and other authors put Aesopus on a level with Roscius. Each was preeminent in his own field; Roscius in comedy, being, with respect to action and delivery (pronuntiatio), more rapid; Aesopus in tragedy, being more weighty. Aesopus took great pains to perfect himself in his art by various methods. He diligently studied the exhibition of character in real life; and when any important trial was going on, especially, for example, when Hortensius was to plead, he was constantly in attendance, that he might watch and be able to represent the more truthfully the feelings which were actually displayed on such occasions. He never, it is said, put on the mask for the character he had to perform in, without first looking at it attentively from a distance for some time, that so in performing he might preserve his voice and action in perfect keeping with the appearance he would have. Perhaps this anecdote may confirm the opinion that masks had only lately been introduced in the regular drama at Rome, and were not always used even for leading characters; for, according to Cicero, Aesopus excelled in power of face and fire of expression, which of course would not have been visible if he had performed only with a mask.

From the whole passage in Cicero and from the anecdotes recorded of Aesopus, his acting would seem to have been characterised chiefly by strong emphasis and vehemence. On the whole, Cicero calls him summus artifex, and says he was fitted to act a leading part no less in real life than on the stage. It does not appear that he ever performed in comedy. Valerius Maximus calls Aesopus and Roscius both "ludicrae artis peritissimos viros," but this may merely denote the theatrical art in general, including tragedy as well as comedy. Fronto calls him Tragicus Aesopus. From Cicero's remark, however, it would seem that the character of Ajax was rather too tragic for him.

Like Roscius, Aesopus enjoyed the intimacy of the great actor, who calls him noster Aesopus, noster familiaris; and they seem to have sought, from one another's society, improvement, each in his respective art. During his exile, Cicero received many valuable marks of Aesopus's friendship. On one occasion, in particular, having to perform the part of Telamon, banished from his country, in one of Lucius Accius's plays, the tragedian, by his manner and skillful emphasis and an occasional change of a word, added to the evident reality of his feelings, and succeeded in leading the audience to apply the whole to the case of Cicero, and so did him more essential service than any direct defense of himself could have done. The whole house applauded. On another occasion, instead of "Brutus qui libertatem civium stabiliverat," he substituted Tullius, and the audience gave utterance to their enthusiasm by encoring the passage "a thousand times".

The time of Aesopus' death or his age can not be fixed with certainty; but at the dedication of the Theatre of Pompey in 55 BC, he would seem to have been elderly, for he was understood previously to have retired from the stage, and we do not hear of his being particularly delicate: yet, from the passage, ill-health or age would appear to have been the reason of his retiring. On that occasion, however, in honor of the festival, he appeared again; but just as he was coming to one of the most emphatic parts, the beginning of an oath, his voice failed him, and he could not go through with the speech. He was evidently unable to proceed, so that any one would readily have excused him: a thing which, as the passage in Cicero implies, a Roman audience would not do for ordinary performers. Aesopus, though far from frugal, realized, like Roscius, an immense fortune by his profession. He left about 200,000 sesterces to his son Clodius, who proved a foolish spendthrift. It is said, for instance, that he took a valuable pearl from the earring of Caecilia Metella, (Note: Usually identified with Caecilia Metella the wife of Publius Cornelius Lentulus Spinther.) dissolved it in vinegar and drank it, a favorite feat of the extravagant monomania in Rome. The connection of Cicero's son-in-law Publius Cornelius Dolabella with the same lady no doubt increased the distress which Cicero felt at the dissolute proceedings of the son of his old friend.
