= Gnaeus Domitius Tullus =

1st century Roman senator and military commander

Gnaeus Domitius Tullus was a Roman senator and military commander active in the first century AD. His full name is Gnaeus Domitius Curvius Tullus. He was twice suffect consul: the first time between 76 and 79; the second time for the nundinium of 13 to 31 January 98 as the colleague of Trajan.

== Early life ==
Tullus was the son of Sextus Curvius Tullus of Gallia Narbonensis, and a woman whose name was likely Titia Marcella. The historian has proposed that Tullus and his brother Lucanus were adopted by a relative named Marcus Epidius Titius Marcellus.

Pliny the Younger explains that their father had been prosecuted by the orator Gnaeus Domitius Afer and was successful in stripping the elder Tullus of his citizenship and wealth; however, Afer then made both Tullus and his brother Gnaeus Domitius Lucanus his testamentary heirs, leaving them his fortune on the condition they took his family name as theirs.

== Career ==
His cursus honorum is recorded in two inscriptions, and provides an outline of his life. Tullus started his senatorial career likely in his teens as a member of the decemviri stlitibus iudicandis, one of the four boards of the vigintiviri, a minor collegia young men whose fathers were members of the Senate serve in at the start of their careers. This was followed by service as a military tribune with Legio V Alaudae on the Rhine frontier, the same legion his brother Tullus served in. Lucanus then proceeded through the ranks of republican magistracies, first as quaestor assisting an unnamed emperor (likely Nero whose name was commonly omitted from inscriptions due to damnatio memoriae), then as plebeian tribune and praetor, after which he and his brother were appointed legatus legionis, or commander, of Legio III Augusta, a posting that included governing the province of Numidia, from the year 70 to 73; Werner Eck suggests Lucanus handled the civilian responsibilities while Tullus commanded the legion. After this, he and his brother were adlected into the Patrician class by the emperors Vespasian and Titus in 72/73; the exact reason for their elevation is not recorded. At first look, it would appear that they were rewarded for their support during the Year of Four Emperors, but after examining the evidence George W. Houston concluded that his "adlection may be interpreted primarily as a response to an emergency: the need for a praetorius vir to replace Sex. Sentius Caecilianus as legate of the legion III Augusta."

Following his adlectio, Tullus served as prefect over a vexillation of soldiers who campaigned against German tribes, and for his success he received the dona militaria, or military award, appropriate to his rank. This was followed by his admission into the Septemviri epulonum, one of the four most prestigious ancient Roman priesthoods. Then he served for a year as legatus possibly alongside his brother Lucanus, proconsular governor of Africa (84/85), before serving as proconsular governor of Africa himself in 85/86.

Tullus' active life left him "gnarled and crippled in every limb", to quote Pliny, who notes that in his old age Tullus was so enfeebled "he could change his posture only with the help of others" and needed help to wash and brush his teeth. "He was often heard to say," Pliny continues, "when he was complaining about the indignities of his weakened state, that every day he licked the fingers of his slaves."

== Family ==
If the fact that Lucanus and Tullus held the same office at the same time was not sufficient evidence that these brothers were very close, then Pliny's letter written following Tullus' death, where he provides a clear example of their loyalty to each other, would provide it.

Lucanus married the daughter of Titus Curtilius Mancia, suffect consul in 55; with her Lucanus had a daughter, Domitia Lucilla. However, Mancia developed a hatred for Lucanus, and offered to make Lucilla his heir only if Lucanus released her from his power as paterfamilias; this would prevent Lucanus from benefiting from the inheritance. This Lucanus did, only to have Tullus then adopt her.

From Pliny's letter, it is unclear whether Tullus had any children of his own. He mentions he had married a woman "with a distinguished pedigree and an honest character" while he was old and crippled and enfeebled by his illness, that she had been married before but was a widow, and had children from her previous marriage. He praises her perseverance for remaining by his side despite his condition, yet Pliny does not tell us her name.

== See also ==
- List of Roman consuls
- Curvia gens

Political offices
Preceded by Gaius Pomponius as Suffect consul	Suffect consul of the Roman Empire; 74 with Lucius Manlius Patruinus	Succeeded by Vespasian VI, and Domitian IV as Ordinary consul
Preceded by Nerva IV as Ordinary consul	Suffect consul of the Roman Empire; 98 with Trajan II	Succeeded by Sextus Julius Frontinus II as Suffect consul
