= Publius Petronius Turpilianus =

1st century AD Roman politician, consul and governor

Publius Petronius Turpilianus (called Petronius) was a Roman senator who held a number of offices in the middle of the 1st century AD, most notably governor of Britain.

== Biography ==
He was the (adopted?) son of Publius Petronius and Plautia, sister of Aulus Plautius who was the conqueror and first governor of Britain.

=== Emperor Nero ===
Petronius was a loyal servant of Emperor Nero.

- He was a Roman Senator.
- In 61 he was an ordinary consul with Lucius Junius Caesennius Paetus as his colleague.

==== Governor of Britannia (61-63) ====
In the second half of 61, he quit his office as consul due to the revolt of the Iceni in Britain. He was appointed Governor of Roman Britain, replacing Gaius Suetonius Paulinus who had been removed from office in the wake of the rebellion of Boudica. In contrast to Suetonius's punitive measures, Petronius took a conciliatory approach, and conducted few military operations.

Under Nero (AD 54–68), the governors of Britannia were technically legati Augusti pro praetore (imperial legates of the emperor with proconsular power). Because Britannia was an imperial province with multiple legions, it was a "consular" province, meaning its governor had to be a senator who had already served as a consul. The fiscal affairs of the province were managed by a procurator, not the governor.

==== Later ====
- In 63 he was replaced by Marcus Trebellius Maximus, and was appointed curator aquarum (superintendent of aqueducts) in Rome.
- In 65 he was given a triumph, apparently for his loyalty to the emperor Nero.

=== Emperor Galba ===
In 9 June 68, the death of Nero, saw Servius Sulpicius Galba, governor of Hispania Tarraconensis, named Emperor (r. 8 June 68 – 15 January 69) by the Senate.

==== Execution ====
During his march from Spain to Rome, Galba had Petronius summarily executed (or ordered him to take his own life) as a commander appointed by Nero.

== Footnotes ==
Political offices
Preceded by Gaius Velleius Paterculus, and Marcus Manilius Vopiscus as Suffect consuls	Consul of the Roman Empire; 61 with Lucius Caesennius Paetus	Succeeded by Gnaeus Pedanius Fuscus Salinator, and Lucius Velleius Paterculus as Suffect consuls
Preceded by Gaius Suetonius Paulinus	Governor of Britain; 61 - 63	Succeeded by Marcus Trebellius Maximus
