= Titus Sextius Africanus =

1st century AD Roman senator and consul

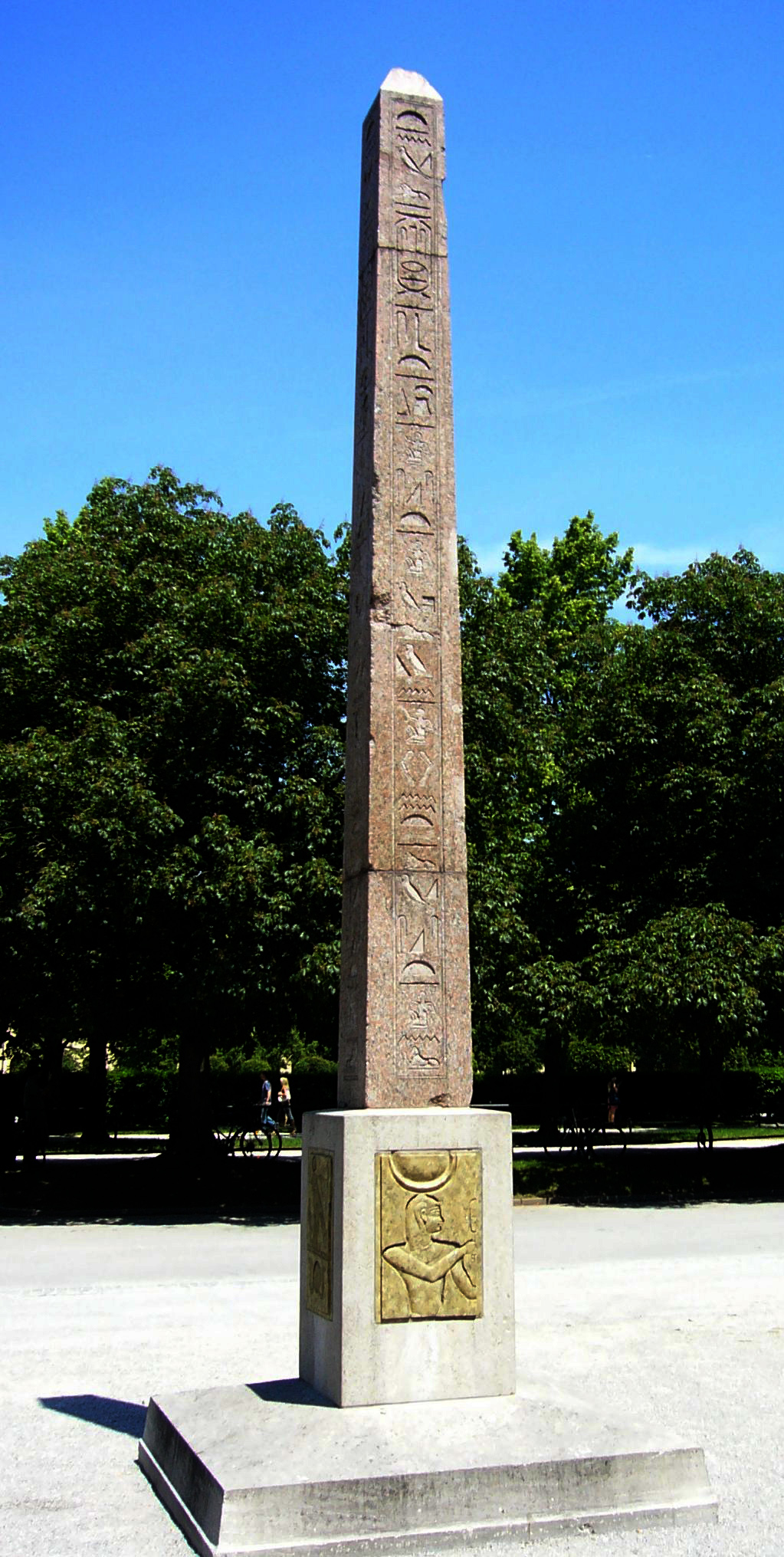
One of the Titus Sextius Africanus obelisks at the Staatliche Sammlung für Ägyptische Kunst museum

Titus Sextius Africanus was a Roman senator who was deterred by Agrippina the Younger from marrying Junia Silana. He served as a suffect consul in 59 AD. In 62 AD, he took the census in the provinces of Gaul, together with Quintus Volusius Saturninus and Marcus Trebellius Maximus. Saturninus and Africanus were rivals, and both hated Trebellius, who took advantage of their rivalry to get the better of them. Africanus is recorded attending meetings of the Fratres Arvales from 54 to 66. Titus Sextius Cornelius Africanus, who served as a consul with Trajan in 112 AD, was related to Africanus.

== See also ==
- Sextia gens

Political offices
Preceded by Gaius Vipstanus Apronianus, and Gaius Fonteius Capito	Suffect consul of the Roman Empire; 59 with Marcus Ostorius Scapula	Succeeded by Nero IV, and Cossus Cornelius Lentulus
