= Quintus Volusius Saturninus =

1st century Roman Senator and consul

Quintus Volusius Saturninus (born AD 25) was a Roman Senator who lived in the Roman Empire during the Principate. He was consul in the year 56 with Publius Cornelius Scipio as his colleague.

== Family background ==
The Volusii, according to Tacitus, were an ancient and distinguished Senatorial family who never rose above the praetorship until Saturninus' grandfather, Lucius Volusius Saturninus, achieved that distinction. Saturninus' father, also named Lucius Volusius Saturninus, not only acceded to that office, but received a state funeral under the Emperor Nero and Cornelia Lentula. Saturninus is known to have an elder brother, Lucius Volusius Saturninus, and a sister, Volusia Cornelia.

He inherited the great Villa dei Volusii near Lucus Feroniae which had been in the family since the 1st c. BC and was probably acquired by the emperor after his death.

== Political career ==
Surviving inscriptions indicate that a burial club of his slaves and freedmen operated a columbarium on the Appian Way. Tacitus describes Saturninus as a man of aristocratic status.

The political career of Saturninus is only known from the point he achieved the consulate. In 61–63, he carried out a census in Gaul, together with Titus Sextius Africanus and Marcus Trebellius Maximus. Saturninus and Africanus were rivals; however, they both hated Maximus, who took advantage of their rivalry to get the better of them. Based on inscriptions, the Horrea Volusiana was either built by his paternal grandfather Lucius Volusius Saturninus, suffect consul of 12 BC, or Saturninus himself.

An inscription attests that Saturninus was also a member of several Roman priesthoods. These were the sodales Augustales, the sodales Titii, and the enigmatic Arval Brethren. Another inscription attests to Saturninus' presence at their ceremonies in the year 63.

== Family and issue ==
Saturninus married a woman called Torquata; her name is known to us from the tombstone of one of her slaves. Torquata bore Saturninus the following children:

- Son, Lucius Volusius Saturninus, consul in 87
- Daughter, Volusia Torquata; she is thought to have married a Marcus Licinius whose name is inferred from their surmised granddaughter Licinia Cornelia M.f. Volusia Torquata.
- Son, Quintus Volusius Saturninus, consul in 92

== Sources ==
- Tacitus - The Annals of Imperial Rome
- G. Rickman, Roman Granaries and Store Buildings, CUP Archive, 1971
- Susan Treggiari, "Family Life among the Staff of the Volusii", Transactions of the American Philological Association, 105 (1974-1975)

Political offices
Preceded by Gnaeus Cornelius Lentulus Gaetulicus, and Titus Curtilius Mancia as suffect consuls	Consul of the Roman Empire; 56 with Publius Cornelius Scipio	Succeeded by Lucius Junius Gallio Annaeanus, and Titus Cutius Ciltus as suffect consuls
