= Pro Roscio Comoedo =

Speech by Cicero

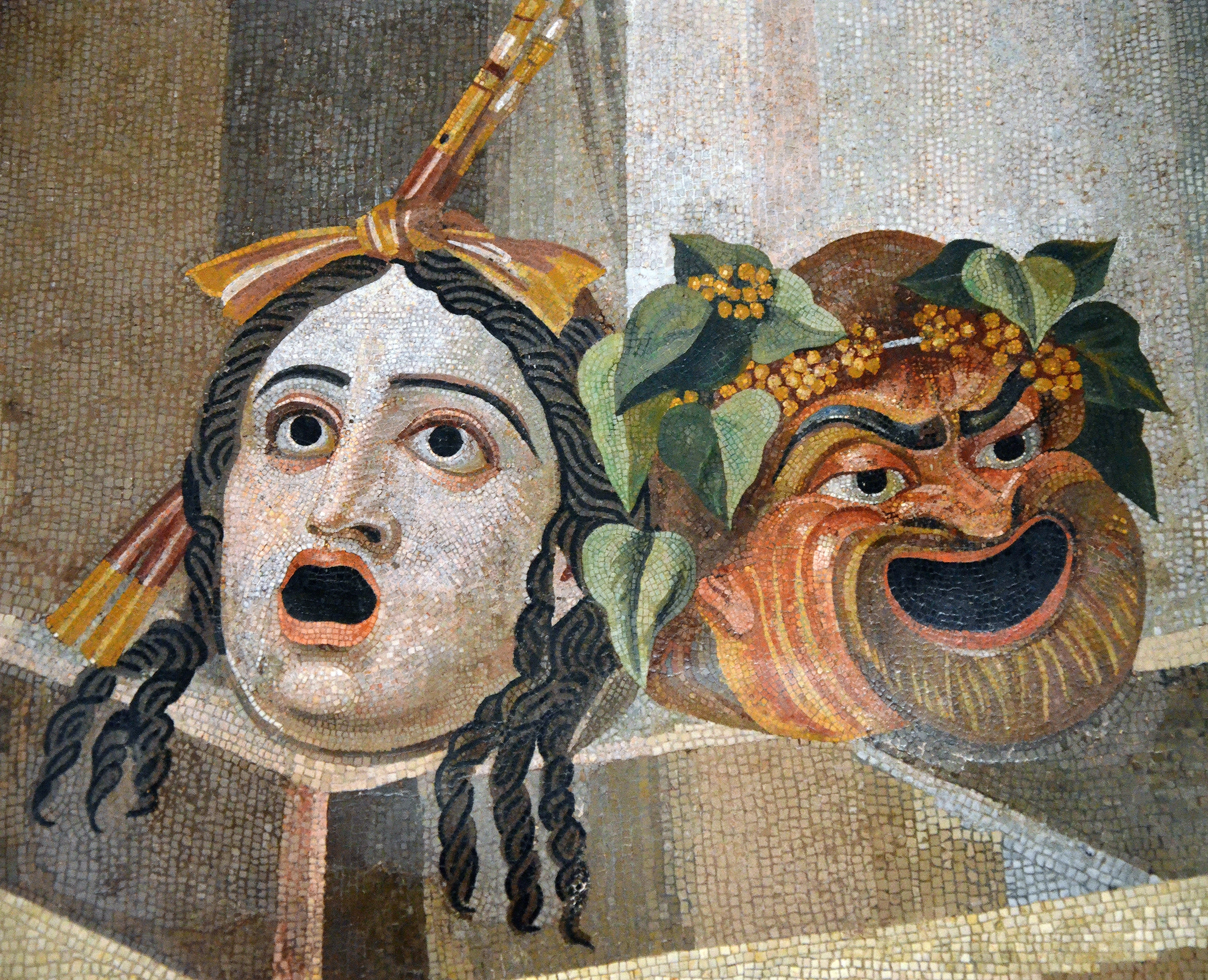
This ancient mosaic depicts acting masks representing tragedy and comedy. Cicero's speech made multiple allusions to comedy in an attempt to paint the claimant Fannius as a disreputable figure from Plautian theatre.

Pro Roscio Comoedo ("On behalf of the comic actor Roscius") is a defence speech given by the politician and orator Marcus Tullius Cicero, some time between 76 and 68 BC, to defend the comic actor Quintus Roscius Gallus in a legal dispute with Gaius Fannius Chaerea over an unpaid settlement to a business partner.

Cicero's speech, amid substantial praise for Roscius' acting talents and references to common theatrical tropees, argued that Roscius' compensation to Fannius was already sufficient since it exceeded the value of the farm when it was received in the 80s BC. Cicero also denied the settlement between Fannius and Roscius existed, on the grounds of poor documentation, and attributed the 50,000 paid to Fannius to generosity or other business dealings. In the end, Cicero was victorious.

== Background ==
=== Facts ===
Quintus Roscius and Gaius Fannius Chaerea had established a partnership in which they jointly owned a slave named Panurgus, with Fannius providing the funds for the slave's purchase and Roscius training the slave in acting. Some fifteen years before the dispute, Panurgus had been killed by one Quintus Flavius. Fannius sued Panurgus on the partnership's behalf but Roscius had separately settled with Flavius and received a farm in compensation for Panurgus' death. According to Fannius, Roscius had kept the income of that farm for himself and refused to tell him of it or share the proceeds for some twelve years. Fannius also claimed that he and Roscius had already reached a settlement where Roscius would pay Fannius some 100,000 sesterces to settle the matter. But Fannius, having received only half the settlement (50,000 sesterces), brought suit against Roscius for non-payment.

Fannius was represented by one Publius Saturius; Roscius leaned on his personal friendship with Cicero, who also had previously defended Roscius' brother-in-law in 81 BC, to secure the orator as counsel. The judge in the trial was Gaius Calpurnius Piso, before whom both Roscius and Fannius had attempted mediation prior to the trial. At the mediation, Fannius also claimed compensation for his representation of Roscius fifteen years earlier in the suit against Flavius and asserted that, at that time, he had agreed with Roscius to divide whatever payment received evenly.

According to the classicist Andrew R. Dyck, it is likely that Roscius felt (some fifteen years earlier) that he had been the main contributor to Panurgus' value – Fannius having only paid in 6,000 sesterces to purchase Panurgus – and therefore was willing to settle confidentially with Flavius without reference to Fannius' claim. When this was discovered some twelve years after the Flavian settlement, Fannius was filed suit for theft of partnership proceeds. Roscius then hastily settled with Fannius for 100,000 sesterces but became unwilling to pay because the farm he had received was not worth anywhere near the 100,000 sesterces which Fannius valued it at and because he heard that Flavius had also paid Fannius some 100,000 sesterces in damages for Panurgus. After three years waiting for Roscius to pay, Fannius filed suit for the remaining 50,000 sesterces of the claimed settlement.

=== Date ===
The trial was held sometime between 76 and 68 BC. Although it has been argued that it occurred in 66 BC, this is not possible since the judge in the trial, Piso, was abroad that year as governor of Cisalpine Gaul. Scholarly dates for the trial differ but centre in the late 70s BC: Hannah Čulík-Baird gives c. 70 BC, Andrew R. Dyck gives 72 or 71 BC. The year 75 BC is also impossible due to Cicero's quaestorship in Sicily.

Andrew R. Dyck argues that 72 or 71 BC is most likely. He believes that Roscius was promoted to the equites by Sulla early in his dictatorship (c. 82 BC) and that the farm whose incomes were alleged not divided was acquired close to the end of the Social War. A later date in the 60s BC would be required if Roscius were legally prohibited from any suit by infamity; however, this bar does not apply since even the infamous were permitted to bring suit for damages done to them. Cicero's claim that the case was argued in his youth can be disregarded since "youth" was an elastic category – indeed it is used elsewhere to mean any time before his praetorship in 66 BC – and a later date is more consistent with the language used in other Ciceronean speeches c. 70–69 BC.

== Synopsis and argument ==
Cicero's published version of the speech does not survive in the whole: both the beginning (specifically the prooemium) and the end (both an argument about the source of the 50,000 denarii paid from Roscius to Fannius and the peroration) are lost. Since Cicero's legal position was relatively weak, it already being settled law that monies owed to a partnership were required to be shared, his speech atomised the claimants' arguments to refuse them individually and appealed to the surrounding crowd (Roman trials were held in public in open air) to support Roscius.

The opening of the speech likely attacked Fannius as an underhanded business partner for his having dragged Roscius into court. He then argues that documentary proof of the settlement between Roscius and Fannius is lacking and incapable of sustaining Fannius' claim. Specifically, Fannius noted the settlement only in his daybook and not in his accounting ledger; although Fannius explained this omission on the grounds that Roscius wanted the settlement to be as confidential as possible since this dispute was publicly embarrassing, Cicero largely ignores this.

Cicero then argues that Roscius was innocent of theft, in this case of funds owed to the partnership as a whole, on largely character evidence. Cicero depicts Roscius as a patron to the Roman acting community at large, a free man whose acting career was not dishonourable but rather in service to the cultural flourishing of Rome, since he did so without taking pay. He also paints him as a mentor in rhetoric and oratory to even elite Roman men like Cicero. Cicero's speech also compares Fannius' appearance with that of a well-known pimp called Ballo in Plautus' Pseudolus. The relevance of Ballo was largely in the fact that Roscius was well-known to play Ballo in stage productions. The speech continues with allusions to dialogue in Plautus' plays which the (mostly theatrical) audience and the elite judge Piso would have been aware. Such argument essentially allows Cicero to reverse the charge by painting Fannius as a greedy character trying to cheat his partner of money.

As to the actual alleged settlement, Cicero denies its existence, arguing that the 50,000 sesterces was paid from Roscius to Fannius out of generosity or other reasons. He gives an argument from equity as to the claimed 100,000 sesterces, arguing that even if Roscius owed Fannius another 50,000 sesterces from the settlement it should not be paid: both Roscius' share of the partnership' value was far more substantial than Fannius' and the farm was at the time of receipt far less valuable than Fannius claimed at trial.

Cicero also argues that Fannius' correct remedy would be to sue Flavius, Roscius' settlement having not foreclosed such action, and alleges rumours that Fannius has also received some 100,000 sesterces from Flavius in a second confidential settlement. If such a settlement between Fannius and Flavius had occurred, Roscius may have felt justified to separately take the farm in lieu of suit against Fannius or Flavius. Finally, he ends on a misleading analogy to Roman inheritance law, trying to apply the fact that heirs had no obligations to pay their fellow heirs anything, to a partnership bound by good faith.

== Manuscripts ==
All extant texts of this speech derive from a single incomplete manuscript discovered by Poggio Bracciolini. He copied the text in 1471 but his copy was lost until being rediscovered in Italy in 1948. That copy, the Vaticanus latinus 11458, is the main source for the 1976 Teubner by Jerzy Axer.

== See also ==
- Theatre of ancient Rome
- Slavery in ancient Rome

== Bibliography ==
- Alexander, Michael Charles (1990). Trials in the late Roman republic, 149 BC to 50 BC. Toronto: University of Toronto Press. ISBN 0-8020-5787-X. OCLC 41156621.
- Broughton, Thomas Robert Shannon (1952). The magistrates of the Roman republic. Vol. 2. New York: American Philological Association.
- Čulík-Baird, Hannah (2022). "The portrait of the actor in Cicero's Pro Roscio comoedo". TAPA. 152 (1): 183–209. doi:10.1353/apa.2022.0010. ISSN 2575-7199.
- Dyck, Andrew R (2025). Introduction. Pro Quinctio. Pro Roscio Amerino. Pro Roscio Comoedo. Pro Tullio. De Lege Agraria. By Cicero. Loeb Classical Library 240. Harvard University Press. pp. 264–73. ISBN 978-0-674-99767-7.
- Dyck, Andrew R (2025). Cicero: the man and his works. Cambridge University Press. doi:10.1017/9781316084342. ISBN 978-1-316-08434-2.
