= Quintilian =

Roman orator and rhetorician (c. 35 – c. 100)

- Marcus Fabius Quintilianus
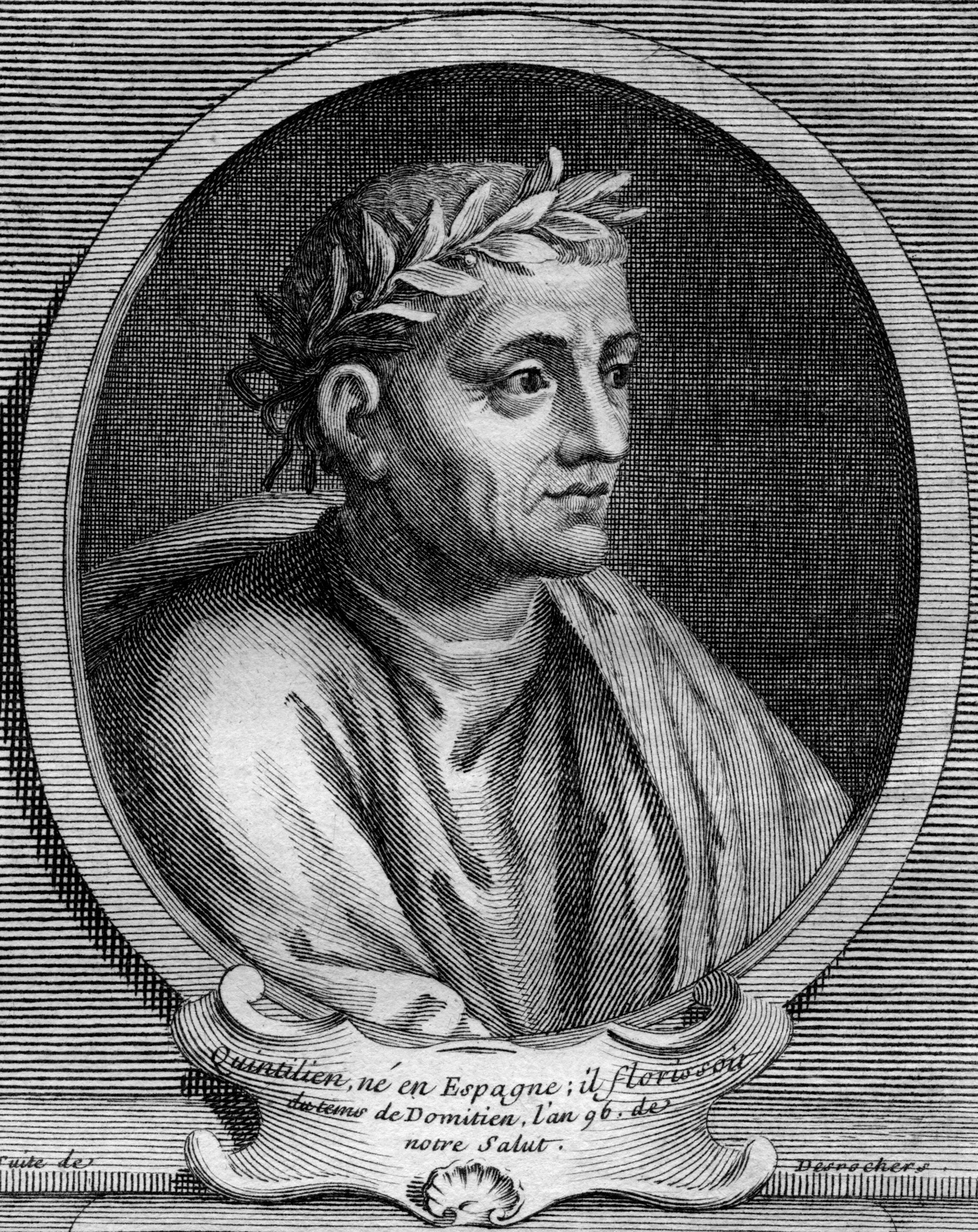
- Engraved portrait by Étienne-Jehandier Desrochers, 18th century
- Born: c. 35; Calagurris, Hispania, Roman Empire
- Died: c. 100 (aged around 65)

Academic background
- Influences: Hesiod; Plato; Aristotle; Chrysippus; Eratosthenes; Cato; Cicero; Afer; Africanus

Academic work
- Discipline: Rhetoric
- School or tradition: Ciceronianism
- Notable students: Pliny the Younger; Tacitus (disputed)
- Notable works: Institutio Oratoria
- Influenced: Juvenal; Jerome; Saint Augustine; Petrarch; Bruni; Erasmus; Luther; Montaigne; Lessing; De Quincey; Mill

Marcus Fabius Quintilianus (Latin: [kʷiːntɪliˈaːnʊs]; c. 35 – c. 100 AD) was a Roman educator and rhetorician born in Hispania, widely referred to in medieval schools of rhetoric and in Renaissance writing. In English translation, he is usually referred to as Quintilian (/kwɪnˈtɪliən/ kwin-TIL-ee-ən), although the alternate spellings of Quintillian and Quinctilian are occasionally seen, the latter in older texts.

== Life ==
Quintilian was born c. 35 AD in Calagurris (Calahorra, La Rioja) in Hispania. His father, a well-educated man, sent him to Rome to study rhetoric early in the reign of Nero. While there, he cultivated a relationship with Domitius Afer, who died in 59. "It had always been the custom … for young men with ambitions in public life to fix upon some older model of their ambition … and regard him as a mentor". Quintilian evidently adopted Afer as his model and listened to him speak and plead cases in the law courts. Afer has been characterized as a more austere, classical, Ciceronian speaker than those common at the time of Seneca the Younger, and he may have inspired Quintilian's love of Cicero.

Sometime after Afer's death, Quintilian returned to Hispania, possibly to practice law in the courts of his own province. However, in 68, he returned to Rome as part of the retinue of Emperor Galba, Nero's short-lived successor. Quintilian does not appear to have been a close advisor of the emperor, which probably ensured his survival after the assassination of Galba in 69.

After Galba's death, and during the chaotic Year of the Four Emperors which followed, Quintilian opened a public school of rhetoric. Among his students were Pliny the Younger, and perhaps Tacitus. The Emperor Vespasian made him a consul. The emperor "in general was not especially interested in the arts, but … was interested in education as a means of creating an intelligent and responsible ruling class". This subsidy enabled Quintilian to devote more time to the school. In addition, he appeared in the courts of law, arguing on behalf of clients.

Of his personal life, little is known. In the Institutio Oratoria, he mentions a wife who died young, as well as two sons who predeceased him.

Quintilian retired from teaching and pleading in 88 AD, during the reign of Domitian. His retirement may have been prompted by his achievement of financial security and his desire to become a gentleman of leisure. Quintilian survived several emperors; the reigns of Vespasian and Titus were relatively peaceful, but that of Domitian was reputed to be difficult. Domitian's cruelty and paranoia may have prompted the rhetorician to distance himself quietly. The emperor does not appear to have taken offence as he made Quintilian tutor of his two grand-nephews in 90 AD. He is believed to have died sometime around 100 AD, not having long survived Domitian, who was assassinated in 96.

== Works ==
The only extant work of Quintilian is a twelve-volume textbook on rhetoric entitled Institutio Oratoria (generally referred to in English as the Institutes of Oratory), written around 95 AD. This work deals not only with the theory and practice of rhetoric, but also with the foundational education and development of the orator, providing advice that ran from the cradle to the grave. An earlier text, De Causis Corruptae Eloquentiae ("On the Causes of Corrupted Eloquence") has been lost, but is believed to have been "a preliminary exposition of some of the views later set forth in [Institutio Oratoria]".

In addition, there are two sets of declamations, Declamationes Maiores and Declamationes Minores, which have been attributed to Quintilian. However, there is some dispute over the real writer of these texts: "Some modern scholars believe that the declamations circulated in his name represent the lecture notes of a scholar either using Quintilian's system or actually trained by him".

=== Institutio Oratoria ===
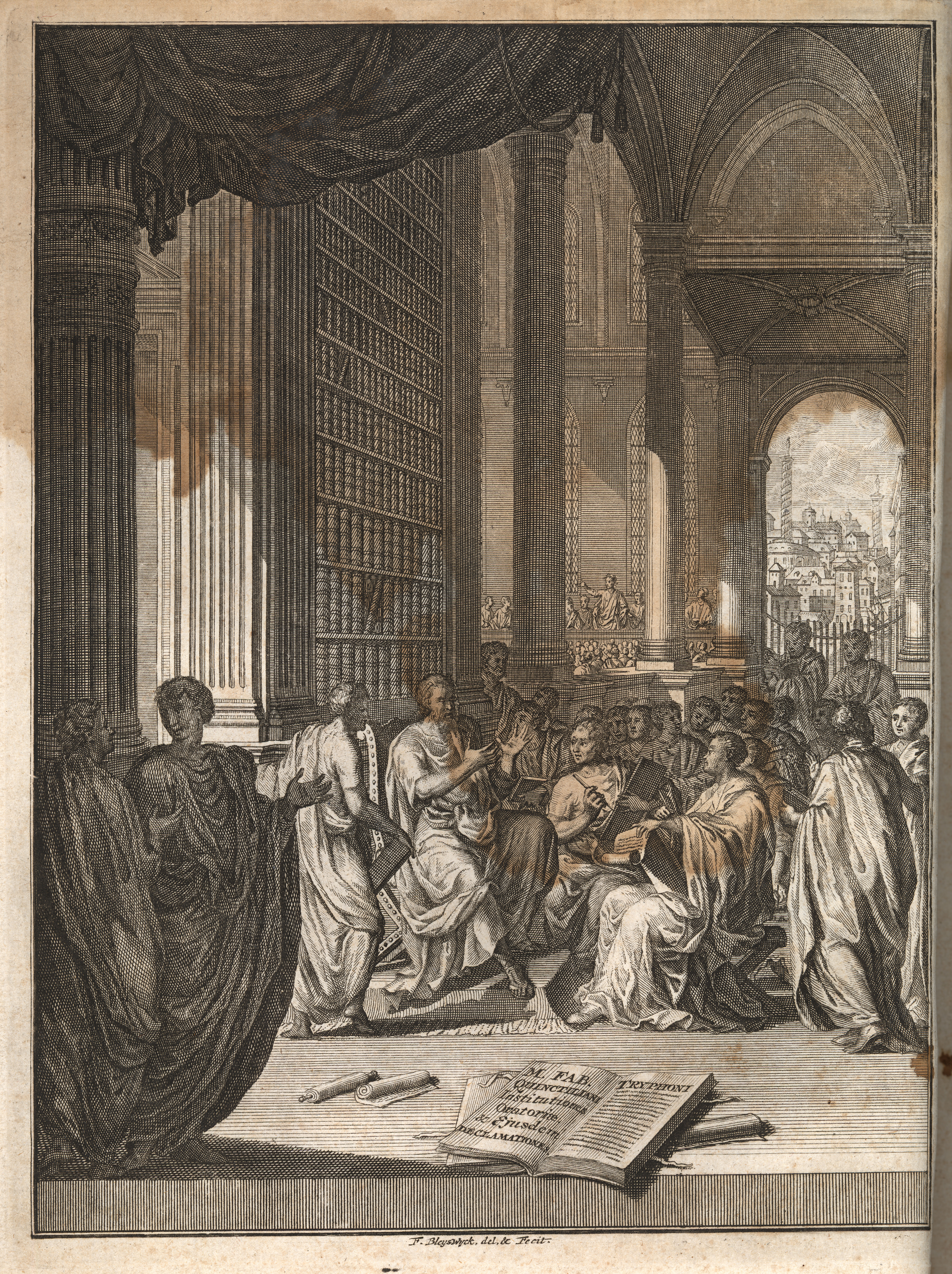
Frontispiece of a 1720 Dutch edition of the Institutio Oratoria, showing Quintilian teaching rhetoric

Institutio Oratoria (English: Institutes of Oratory) is Quintilian's twelve-volume textbook on the theory and practice of rhetoric. It was written around year 95 AD. The work deals also with the foundational education and development of orators. In this work, Quintilian establishes that the perfect orator is first a good man, and after that he is a good speaker. He also believed that a speech should stay genuine to a message that is "just and honorable". This came to be known as his good man theory, embracing the message that if one cannot be genuinely good, then one cannot be a good speaker for the people. This theory also revolves around being of service to the people. He asserts that a good man is one who works for the good of the people and the prosperity of society.

Quintilian wrote Institutio Oratoria in the last years of Domitian's rule of the Roman Empire. He had worked alongside Domitian, but as he began to write more and ease away from Emperor Domitian's complete power, the emperor did not seem to mind. The emperor was so impressed with Quintilian's devotion to education that he hired him to be a tutor for his family. Domitian was in the harshest period of his rule at that time and almost no one had the courage to speak any idea that was unlike his, but Quintilian did. He spoke as an orator in the tradition of Cicero, such as had not been seen since the beginning of the reign of Augustus. Rather than pleading cases, as an orator of his era might have been expected to do, he concentrated on speaking in more general terms about how sound rhetoric influences the education of the people.

== Placement of Quintilian's rhetoric ==
Quintilian cites many authors in the Institutio Oratoria before providing his own definition of rhetoric. His rhetoric is chiefly defined by Cato the Elder's vir bonus, dicendi peritus, or "the good man skilled at speaking". Later he states: "I should like the orator I am training to be a sort of Roman Wise Man". Quintilian also "insists that his ideal orator is no philosopher because the philosopher does not take as a duty participation in civic life; this is constitutive of Quintilian's (and Isocrates' and Cicero's) ideal orator". Though he calls for imitation, he also urges the orator to use this knowledge to inspire his own original invention.

No author receives greater praise in the Institutio Oratoria than Cicero: "For who can instruct with greater thoroughness, or more deeply stir the emotions? Who has ever possessed such a gift of charm?". Quintilian's definition of rhetoric shares many similarities with that of Cicero, one being the importance of the speaker's moral character. Like Cicero, Quintilian also believes that "history and philosophy can increase an orator's command of copia and style;" they differ in that Quintilian "features the character of the orator, as well as the art".

In Book II, Quintilian sides with Plato's assertion in the Phaedrus that the rhetorician must be just: "In the Phaedrus, Plato makes it even clearer that the complete attainment of this art is even impossible without the knowledge of justice, an opinion in which I heartily concur". Their views are further similar in their treatment of "(1) the inseparability, in more respects than one, of wisdom, goodness, and eloquence; and (2) the morally ideological nature of rhetoric. [...] For both, there are conceptual connections between rhetoric and justice which rule out the possibility of [an] amorally neutral conception of rhetoric. For both, rhetoric is 'speaking well,' and for both 'speaking well' means speaking justly".

== Influence of Quintilian ==
The influence of Quintilian's masterwork, Institutio Oratoria, can be felt in several areas. First of all, there is his criticism of the orator Seneca the Younger. Quintilian was attempting to modify the prevailing imperial style of oratory with his book, and Seneca was the principal figure in that style's tradition. He was more recent than many of the authors mentioned by Quintilian, but his reputation within the post-classical style necessitated both his mention and the criticism or back-handed praise that is given to him. Quintilian believed that "his style is for the most part corrupt and extremely dangerous because it abounds in attractive faults". Seneca was regarded as doubly dangerous because his style was sometimes attractive. This reading of Seneca "has heavily coloured subsequent judgments of Seneca and his style".

Quintilian also made an impression on Martial, the Latin poet. A short poem, written in 86 AD, was addressed to him, and opened, "Quintilian, greatest director of straying youth, / you are an honour, Quintilian, to the Roman toga". However, one should not take Martial's praise at face value, since he was known for his sly and witty insults. The opening lines are all that are usually quoted, but the rest of the poem contains lines such as "A man who longs to surpass his father's census rating". This speaks of Quintilian's ambitious side and his drive for wealth and position.

After his death, Quintilian's influence fluctuated. He was mentioned by his pupil, Pliny, and by Juvenal, who may have been another student, "as an example of sobriety and of worldly success unusual in the teaching profession". During the 3rd to 5th centuries, his influence was felt among such authors as St. Augustine of Hippo, whose discussion of signs and figurative language certainly owed something to Quintilian, and to St. Jerome, editor of the Vulgate Bible, whose theories on education are clearly influenced by Quintilian's. The Middle Ages saw a decline in knowledge of his work, since existing manuscripts of Institutio Oratoria were fragmented, but the Italian humanists revived interest in the work after the discovery by Poggio Bracciolini in 1416 of a forgotten, complete manuscript in the Abbey of Saint Gall, which he found "buried in rubbish and dust" in a filthy dungeon. The influential scholar Leonardo Bruni, considered the first modern historian, greeted the news by writing to his friend Poggio:

It will be your glory to restore to the present age, by your labour and diligence, the writings of excellent authors, which have hitherto escaped the researches of the learned... Oh! what a valuable acquisition! What an unexpected pleasure! Shall I then behold Quintilian whole and entire, who, even in his imperfect state, was so rich a source of delight?... But Quintilian is so consummate a master of rhetoric and oratory, that when, after having delivered him from his long imprisonment in the dungeons of the barbarians, you transmit him to this country, all the nations of Italy ought to assemble to bid him welcome... Quintilian, an author whose works I will not hesitate to affirm, are more an object of desire to the learned than any others, excepting only Cicero's dissertation De Republica.

The Italian poet Petrarch addressed one of his letters to the dead to Quintilian, and for many he "provided the inspiration for a new humanistic philosophy of education". This enthusiasm for Quintilian spread with humanism itself, reaching northern Europe in the 15th and 16th centuries. Martin Luther, the German theologian and ecclesiastical reformer, "claimed that he preferred Quintilian to almost all authors, 'in that he educates and at the same time demonstrates eloquence, that is, he teaches in word and in deed most happily'". The influence of Quintilian's works is also seen in Luther's contemporary Erasmus of Rotterdam. He above all shaped the implicit depth of humanism and had studied at Steyn.

It has been argued by a musicologist, Ursula Kirkendale, that the composition of Johann Sebastian Bach's Das musikalische Opfer (The Musical Offering, BWV 1079), was closely connected with the Institutio Oratoria. Among Bach's duties during his tenure at Leipzig (1723–1750) was teaching Latin; his early training included rhetoric. (Philologist and Rector of the Leipzig Thomasschule, Johann Matthias Gesner, for whom Bach composed a cantata in 1729, published a substantial Quintilian edition with a long footnote in Bach's honor.)

After this high point, Quintilian's influence seems to have lessened somewhat, although he is mentioned by the English poet Alexander Pope in his versified An Essay on Criticism:

In grave Quintilian's copious works we find
The justest rules and clearest method join'd (lines 669–70).

In addition, "he is often mentioned by writers like Montaigne and Lessing... but he made no major contribution to intellectual history, and by the nineteenth century he seemed to be... rather little read and rarely edited". However, in his celebrated Autobiography, John Stuart Mill (arguably the nineteenth-century's most influential English intellectual) spoke highly of Quintilian as a force in his early education. He wrote that Quintilian, while little-read in Mill's day due to "his obscure style and to the scholastic details of which many parts of his treatise are made up", was "seldom sufficiently appreciated." "His book," Mill continued, "is a kind of encyclopaedia of the thoughts of the ancients on the whole field of education and culture; and I have retained through life many valuable ideas which I can distinctly trace to my reading of him...". He was also highly praised by Thomas De Quincey: "[F]or elegance and as a practical model in the art he was expounding, neither Aristotle, nor any less austere among the Greek rhetoricians, has any pretensions to measure himself with Quintilian. In reality, for a triumph over the difficulties of the subject, and as a lesson on the possibility of imparting grace to the treatment of scholastic topics, naturally as intractable as that of Grammar or Prosody, there is no such chef-d'œuvre to this hour in any literature, as the Institutions of Quintilian".

In more recent times, Quintilian appears to have made another upward turn. He is frequently included in anthologies of literary criticism, and is an integral part of the history of education. He is believed to be the "earliest spokesman for a child-centered education", which is discussed above under his early childhood education theories. As well, he has something to offer students of speech, professional writing, and rhetoric, because of the great detail with which he covers the rhetorical system. His discussions of tropes and figures also formed the foundation of contemporary works on the nature of figurative language, including the post-structuralist and formalist theories. For example, the works of Jacques Derrida on the failure of language to impart the truth of the objects it is meant to represent would not be possible without Quintilian's assumptions about the function of figurative language and tropes.

== See also ==
- Quadripartita ratio
- Dionysian imitatio
