= Lucius Cestius Pius =

Latin rhetorician

Lucius Cestius, surnamed Pius (fl. 9 AD), Latin rhetorician, flourished during the reign of Augustus.

He was a native of Smyrna, a Greek by birth. According to Jerome, he was teaching Latin at Rome in the year 13 BC. He must have been living after AD 9, since, we are told that he taunted the son of Quinctilius Varus with his father's defeat in the Teutoburgian Forest (Seneca the Elder, Controv. i. 3, 10).

Cestius was a man of great ability, but vain, quarrelsome and sarcastic. Before he left Asia, he was invited to dinner by Cicero's son, then governor of the province. His host, being uncertain as to his identity, asked a slave who Cestius was; and on receiving the answer, "he is the man who said your father was illiterate," ordered him to be flogged (Seneca, Suasoriae, vii. 13).

As an orator in the schools Cestius enjoyed a great reputation, and was worshipped by his youthful pupils, one of whom imitated him so slavishly that he was nicknamed "my monkey" by his teacher (Seneca, Controv. ix. 3, 12). As a public orator, on the other hand, he was a failure. Although a Greek, he always used Latin in his declamations, and, although he was sometimes at a loss for Latin words, he never suffered from lack of ideas. Numerous specimens of his declamations will be found in the works of Seneca the rhetorician.

See the monograph De Lucio Cestio Pio, by FG Lindner (1858); J Brzoska in Pauly-Wissowa's Realencyclopädie, iii. 2 (1899); Teuffel-Schwabe, Hist. of Roman Lit. (Eng. tr.), 268, 6; M Schanz, Geschichte der römischen Litteratur, ii.

== See also ==
- Cestia gens
