= Gnaeus Domitius Afer =

1st century AD Roman orator and advocate

Gnaeus Domitius Afer (died 59) was a Roman orator and advocate, born at Nemausus (Nîmes) in Gallia Narbonensis. He flourished in the reigns of Tiberius, Caligula, Claudius and Nero. He was suffect consul in the nundinium of September to December 39 as the colleague of Aulus Didius Gallus.

== Life ==
Afer became praetor in 25 AD, and gained the favor of Tiberius by accusing Claudia Pulchra, the second cousin of Agrippina, of adultery and the use of magic arts against the emperor, in 26 AD. From this time he became one of the most celebrated orators in Rome, but sacrificed his character by conducting accusations for the government. In the following year, 27 AD, he is again mentioned by Tacitus as the accuser of Quinctilius Varus, the son of Claudia Pulchra. In consequence of the accusation of Claudia Pulchra, and of some offense which he had given to Caligula, he was accused by the emperor in the senate, but by concealing his own skill in speaking, and pretending to be overpowered by the eloquence of Caligula, Afer not only escaped the danger, but was made consul suffectus in 39 AD.

In his old age Afer lost much of his reputation by continuing to speak in public, when his powers were exhausted. During the reign of Nero he became curator aquarum, or superintendent of the city's water supply, but died not long afterwards, in 59 AD, having eaten himself to death, according to Jerome in the Chronicon of Eusebius.

Quintilian, when a young man, heard Afer, and frequently speaks of him as the most distinguished orator of his age. He says that Afer and Julius Africanus were the best orators he had heard, and that he prefers the former to the latter, Quintilian refers to a work of his On Testimony, to one entitled Dicta, and to some of his orations, of which those on behalf of Domitilla, or Cloantilla, and Lucius Volusenus Catulus seem to have been the most celebrated.

According to Pliny the Younger, in his will Afer had made Titius Marcellus Curvius Lucanus and Titius Marcellus Curvius Tullus his heirs on the condition that they take on his name. He had prosecuted their father, Sextus Curvius Tullus, stripping him of his wealth and citizenship. Pliny comments that Afer's will had been drawn up 18 years previously, suggesting that Afer and Tullus the elder had once been friends.

== See also ==
- List of ancient Roman speeches
- Domitia gens
- Nerva–Antonine dynasty

Political offices
Preceded by Gnaeus Domitius Corbulo, and ignotus	Roman consul AD 39 (suffect) with Aulus Didius Gallus	Succeeded by Caligula III, sine collega
