= Gnaeus Cornelius Lentulus Gaetulicus (consul 55) =

1st century AD Roman senator and consul

Gnaeus Cornelius Lentulus Gaetulicus was a Roman senator, who flourished under the reign of Nero. He was consul in the nundinium of November to December 55 with Titus Curtilius Mancia as his colleague. He is known entirely from inscriptions.

Lentulus belonged to a branch of the Cornelii that had suffered under Nero's predecessors, and "might be expected to harbor resentment against the dynasty". His father Gnaeus Cornelius Lentulus Gaetulicus, consul in 26, had been executed for his role in a failed attempt to overthrow Caligula. Gaetulicus was the first of his family to reach the consulate since his father. Judith Ginsburg argues that Gaetulicus' appointment was an attempt to strengthen his position by conciliating favor amongst the Senatorial opposition which was rooted in members who could trace their ancestry from the nobiles of the old Republic.

His mother was Apronia, one of the daughters of Lucius Apronius, consul in AD 8. He may be the father of Cornelia Gaetulica.

Political offices
Preceded by Publius Palfurius, and Lucius Annaeus Seneca as suffect consuls	Suffect consul of the Roman Empire; 55 with Titus Curtilius Mancia	Succeeded by Quintus Volusius Saturninus, and Publius Cornelius (Lentulus?) Scipio as ordinary consuls
