= Quintus Roscius =

1st-century BC Roman actor

Quintus Roscius (c. 126 BC – 62 BC) was a highly renowned Roman actor during the 1st century BC. He was known for the immense quality of his acting, especially in comedy, which earnt him a large fortune. Promoted to the equestrian order by the dictator Sulla in the late 80s BC, he avoided infamia – the status of reduced civil rights in Roman law for performing on stage for pay – by performing without pay.

A friend and mentor of Cicero in Cicero's youth, Roscius also trained other actors, mentored people in oratory and rhetoric, and wrote treatises on performance. Cicero, for his part, supported Roscius and his family when they came under suit; two speeches from two trials – Pro Quinctio and Pro Q. Roscio Comoedo – survive from this advocacy work.

== Life ==
Roscius was born in Lanuvium, about 3 miles (4.8 km) from Rome. The cognomen Gallus is dubious, as it appears only once as a scholia (manuscript comment) by the Bobbio Scholiast (who lived over half a millennium after Roscius's lifetime) in a manuscript of Cicero's Pro Archia. While some sources have described Roscius as having been a slave due to the reputed cognomen Gallus leading some authors to conclude he was a freedman, this is probably in error, and he was likely freeborn and came from a fairly well-off family. Cicero, moreover, strongly associates him with the elite of the Italian town Lanuvium from his infancy there. His sister's marriage to one of Cicero's freeborn defendants also makes claims of servile origin very unlikely.

Roscius was recognized for his heavily practiced and naturalistic character performances, with his gesturing being particularly well regarded. He especially excelled in comedy, though also performed in tragedy. Roscius was renowned as a teacher, and Cicero took lessons from him early on in his career and subsequently became his friend. The two often engaged in friendly rivalry to try whether the orator or the actor could express a thought or emotion with the greater effect, and Roscius wrote a treatise in which he compared acting and oratory. The dictator Lucius Cornelius Sulla (died 78 BC) presented him with a gold ring, denoting his promotion to the equestrian order, a remarkable distinction for an actor in Rome, where the profession was held in contempt and actors marked with infamia. Roscius afterwards performed without payment, which allowed him to preserve his status as an equestrian, since infamia attached to the taking of pay for performances.

Like his contemporary Aesopus, Roscius amassed a large fortune. Macrobius relates that Roscius' popularity was so great that he received daily 1,000 denarii a day from public funds. Late in his life, he was earning 300,000 sesterces per year. He also was an educator and mentor, training slaves in acting as well as a mentor in dramatic oratory to members of the aristocratic elite such as Cicero. He also established a formal school for acting and had written treatises on acting and oratory. In 62 BC, Roscius died, as evidenced by Cicero's remarks of his artistic excellence in a speech that year.

== Trial ==
Most of what is known about Roscius emerges from a civil trial where Cicero defended him from suit by a Gaius Fannius Chaerea for 50,000 sesterces. The date of the trial is not well established. Estimates place it between 76 and 68 BC, with the classicist Andrew R. Dyck preferring 72 or 71 BC. Evidence for the date of the trial is focused on at least three things: that Roscius had acquired a farm during a time of economic uncertainty fifteen years before the trial; that Roscius had stopped taking pay for his acting for ten years; and Cicero argued the trial in his youth. Dyck associates the acquisition of the farm with the end of the Social War c. 87 BC and the end of his acting for pay with Roscius' elevation by Sulla to the equestrians c. 82 BC.

The legal dispute centred on the joint ownership between Roscius and Fannius of a slave called Panurgus, who had been bought by Fannius and trained in acting by Roscius. Some fifteen years before the trial, Panurgus had been slain by a third party (a certain Quintus Flavius) and in compensation for Panurgus' death, Roscius had received from that third party a farm. Fannius alleged that Roscius had held the farm, taking all profits from it, for twelve years without his knowledge and thereby misappropriated Fannius' share of compensation for Panurgus' death. According to Fannius, Roscius had already settled with Fannius Fannius for 100,000 sesterces, of which only 50,000 had been paid; Fannius therefore brought suit for the remaining 50,000.

Cicero's speech now called Pro Q. Roscio Comoedo comically played up Roscius' theatrical excellence and made references to well known comedic tropes, also referencing a legend Roscius had been found "sleeping wrapped in the embrace of snake" as an infant. He also argued that Roscius' compensation to Fannius was already sufficient since the value of the farm as it had been received was far less than the already-paid 50,000 sesterces. Cicero also denied the settlement between Fannius and Roscius existed on the grounds of poor documentation.

== Reputation ==
Roscius was so renowned for his talents that his name became a byword for someone who had become highly skilled within their field.

By the Renaissance, Roscius formed the paradigm for dramatic excellence. When Thomas Nashe wanted to praise Edward Alleyn as the best actor of his generation, he called Alleyn a Roscius (Pierce Penniless, 1592); John Downes titled his history of Restoration drama Roscius Anglicanus (1708). David Garrick, the leading English actor of his day, was known as the English Roscius. The African American actor Ira Aldridge, who was born in New York in 1807 and died in Lodz, Poland in 1867, and one of the finest Shakespearean actors of his age, was known as 'The African Roscius'.

== In literature ==
Roscius is mentioned by Hamlet in Act II, Scene II of Shakespeare's tragedy, and in Henry VI, Part 3 Act 5, Scene 6.

In the 1850 novel David Copperfield by Charles Dickens, the character Mr. Barkis calls the title character 'a young Roeshus', the misspelling apparently meant to reflect Barkis' rustic background.

== Bibliography ==
=== Modern sources ===
- Alexander, Michael Charles (1990). Trials in the late Roman republic, 149 BC to 50 BC. Toronto: University of Toronto Press. ISBN 0-8020-5787-X. OCLC 41156621.
- Čulík-Baird, Hannah (2022). "The portrait of the actor in Cicero's Pro Roscio comoedo". TAPA. 152 (1): 183–209. doi:10.1353/apa.2022.0010. ISSN 2575-7199.
- Dyck, Andrew R (2025). Cicero: the man and his works. Cambridge University Press. doi:10.1017/9781316084342. ISBN 978-1-316-08434-2.
- von der Mühll, Friedrich (1914). "Roscius 16" . Realencyclopädie der classischen Altertumswissenschaft (in German). Vol. I A, 1. Stuttgart: Butcher. cols. 1123–1125 – via Wikisource.
- Horst-Dieter, Blume. "Roscius I 4". Brill's New Pauly Online. doi:10.1163/1574-9347_bnp_e1024780.
- Smith, William, ed. (1870). "Roscius 3". Dictionary of Greek and Roman Biography and Mythology. Vol. 3. pp. 662–663.

=== Ancient sources ===
- Cicero. Pro Archia.
- Cicero. Pro Roscio comoedo.
