= Pacilia gens =

Ancient Roman family

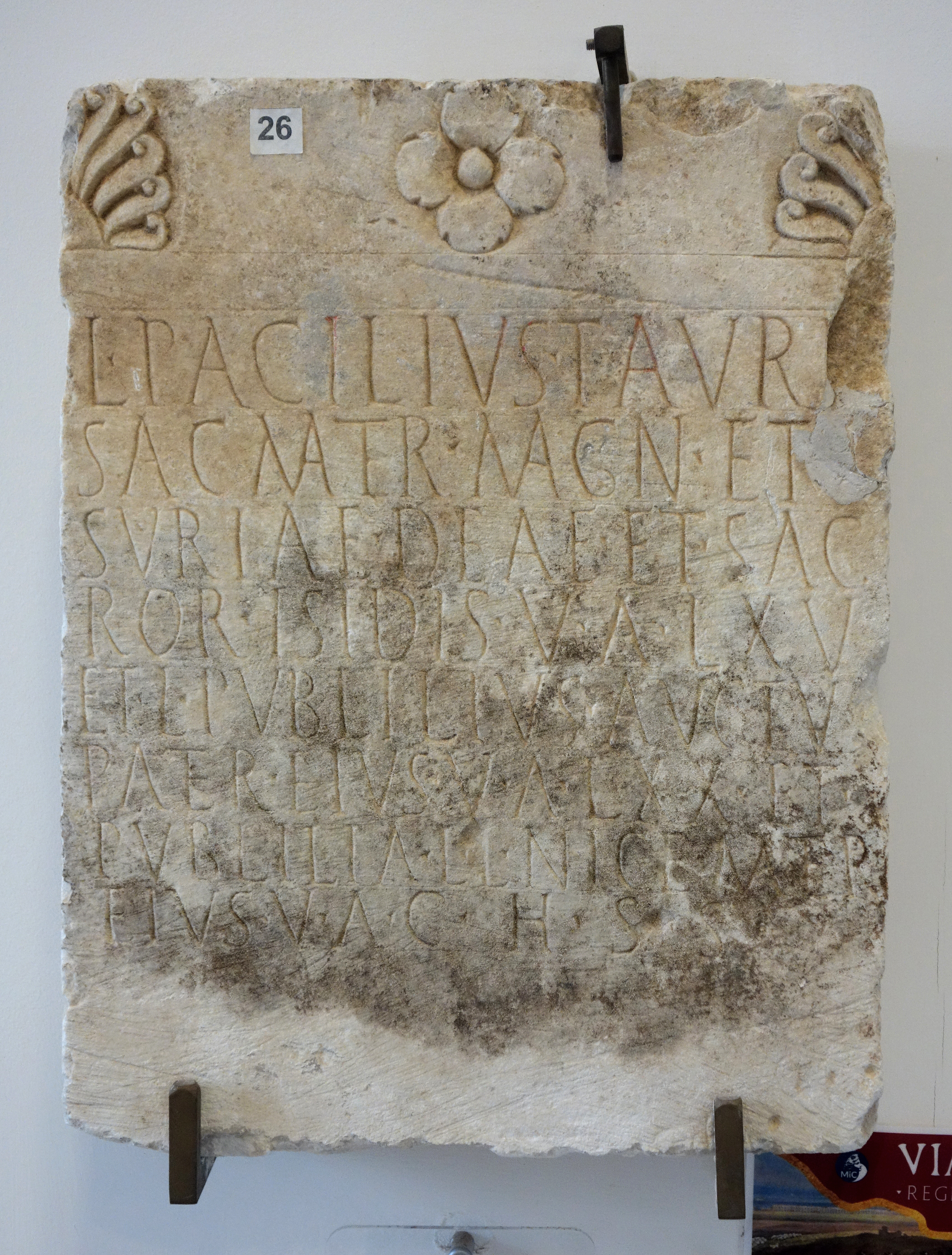
Funerary stele of Lucius Pacilius Taurus, priest of the Magna Mater, the Syrian goddess, and the mysteries of Isis, Brindisi, first century

The gens Pacilia was an obscure plebeian family at ancient Rome. Few members of this gens are mentioned by the ancient historians, of whom the most famous may be a certain Marcus Pacilius spoken of by Cicero in his second oration against Verres. However, many Pacilii are known from inscriptions.

== Origin ==
The nomen Pacilius belongs to a class of gentilicia formed from other names, using the suffix -ilius. In this case, the nomen is derived from the cognomen Pacilus, a name of Oscan origin, itself perhaps derived from the Oscan Paccius, which was used both as praenomen and gentilicium. It would therefore be a cognate of Paccius, and perhaps also of Pacidius. (Note: Pacidius was probably formed from Paccius using -idius as a gentile-forming suffix, even though there does not seem to have been a corresponding intermediate form, Pacidus. However, it could, at least in some cases, be an alternative orthography of Placidius, formed regularly from the surname Placidus.)

== Praenomina ==
The main praenomina of the Pacilii were Publius, Lucius, Marcus, Gnaeus, Quintus, and Gaius. There are individual examples of other names, including Aulus, Sextus, and Spurius. All but the last were common throughout Roman history; Spurius was used chiefly during the Republic. One of the Pacilii also bore the feminine praenomen Posilla, meaning "little".

== Members ==
This list includes abbreviated praenomina. For an explanation of this practice, see filiation.

- Marcus Pacilius, whom Cicero describes as a needy pauper, was induced by Verres to accuse Sthenius, a citizen of Thermae, of wrongdoing, in order for Verres to punish Sthenius and the people of Thermae for resisting his plunder of the city's sculptures and ornaments. However, when the time came to present his accusation, Pacilius did not appear.
- Pacilius, the owner of a house, the Paciliana domus, which Cicero's brother, Quintus, wished to purchase.
- Pacilia A. f., named in an inscription from Praeneste.
- Pacilia Cn. f., daughter of Gnaeus Pacilius Veteranus and Apolauste, buried at Rome, aged two months, two days.
- Pacilia Cn. f., buried at Brundisium in Calabria.
- Pacilia L. l., a freedwoman named in an inscription from Rome.
- Pacilia P. l., a freedwoman named in an inscription from Brundisium.
- Lucius Pacilius, named in an inscription from Nomentum.
- Lucius Pacilius S. f., named in an inscription from Philippi.
- Quintus Pacilius, named in an inscription from Cirta in Numidia.
- Gnaeus Pacilius Abinnaeus, buried at Ostia.
- Publius Pacilius, a landowner at Castrimoenium.
- Sextus Pacilius Sex. f., named in an inscription from Philippi.
- Gaius Pacilius Agathonicus, dedicated a monument at Rome to his dear friend, Mustia Isias, aged thirty-two years, one month, ten days.
- Publius Pacilius Agathopus, buried at Brundisium, aged fifty-five.
- Publius Pacilius Ↄ. l. Agilis, a freedman buried at Canusium in Apulia.
- Publius Pacilius P. f. Alcaeus, son of Publius Pacilius Leo, was a soldier buried at Perusia, aged twenty-two, having served two years in the tenth urban cohort at Rome.
- Publius Pacilius Alexis, son of Pacilia Prisca and Marcus Antonius Phronimus, buried at Rome, aged eight years, two months.
- Pacilia Ↄ. l. Antiochis, a freedwoman buried at Canusium.
- Pacilia Ↄ. l. Arescusa, a freedwoman, buried at Brundisium.
- Pacilius Attius, named in an inscription from Savaria in Pannonia Superior.
- Pacilius Bassus, named in an inscription from Savaria.
- Gaius Pacilius C. f. Callistus, son of Gaius Pacilius Felix, named in an inscription from Volsinii.
- Pacilia Capria, a freedwoman who dedicated a monument at Saepinum in Samnium to Pacilius Severus and Pacilius Vitalis.
- Publius Pacilius Chrysomallus, named in an inscription from Canusium, dating to AD 223.
- Marcus Pacilius M. f. Collinus, son of Marcus Pacilius Marcellus, and brother of Pacilia Marcella, according to an inscription from Tricesimum in the province of Venetia and Histria.
- Gnaeus Pacilius Dapnicus, buried at Ostia.
- Lucius Pacilius Rufionis l. Epaphra, freedman of Lucius Pacilius Rufio, and father of the younger Lucius Pacilius Epaphra.
- Lucius Pacilius Rufionis l. L. f. Epaphra, freedman of Lucius Pacilius Rufio, and son of the elder Lucius Pacilius Epaphra, buried at Brundisium, aged nineteen years, eight months.
- Lucius Pacilius Eros, buried at Rome.
- Pacilia Estricata, buried at Sicca Veneria in Africa Proconsularis, aged ninety-one.
- Pacilia Euphrosyne, wife of Gaius Valerius Onesimus, and mother of Valeria Valentina, who erected a monument to her at Rome.
- Pacilia Euphrosyne, buried at Carthage in Africa Proconsularis,
- Pacilius Eutactis, buried at Rome.
- Publius Pacilius P. l. Expectatus, a freedman buried at Canusium.
- Pacilia Rufionis l. Fausta, a freedwoman, probably of Lucius Pacilius Rufio, buried at Brundisium.
- Gaius Pacilius Felix, the father of Gaius Pacilius Callistus, named in an inscription from Volsinii.
- Lucius Pacilius Felix, named in an inscription from Rome.
- Quintus Pacilius Felix, dedicated a monument at Lambaesis in Numidia to his brother, Quintus Pacilius Musianus.
- Marcus Pacilius M. f. Fortunatus, named in an inscription from Rome.
- Pacilia Hellas, buried at Rome.
- Pacilia Helpis, buried at Brundisium, aged fifty-two.
- Gnaeus Pacilius Cn. l. Hilarus, a freedman buried at Rome.
- Marcus Pacilius Hilarus, named in an inscription from Rome.
- Lucius Pacilius Labeo, named in an inscription from Allifae.
- Pacilia Ↄ. l. Lais, buried at Rome.
- Publius Pacilius Leo, dedicated a monument at Perusia to his son, Publius Pacilius Alcaeus.
- Pacilia M. f. Marcella, daughter of Marcus Pacilius Marcellus, and sister of Marcus Pacilius Collinus, according to an inscription from Tricesimum.
- Marcus Pacilius Marcellus, the father of Marcus Pacilius Collinus and Pacilia Marcella, according to an inscription from Tricesimum.
- Gnaeus Pacilius Marna, one of the Seviri Augustales, named in an inscription from Arcella, a village north of Patavium.
- Quintus Pacilius Musianus, brother of Quintus Pacilius Felix, buried at Lambaesis, aged seventy.
- Quintus Pacilius Mustianus, father of Quintus Pacilius Vitalis, buried at Lambaesis, aged fifty-three.
- Marcus Pacilius M. l. Nicephorus, a freedman buried at Rome.
- Gaius Pacilius C. l. Onesimus, a freedman named in an inscription from Sebastopolis in Pontus.
- Lucius Pacilius Prepons, named in an inscription from Rome.
- Pacilia Primitiva, named in an inscription from Arcella.
- Gaius Pacilius Priscus, named in an inscription found at Geiselprechting, formerly in Raetia, dating from AD 64.
- Publius Pacilius Pudens, named in an inscription from the present site of Bagnolo in Piano, formerly part of Cisalpine Gaul.
- Marcus Pacilius M. Ↄ. l. Quinquatralis, a freedman named in a funerary inscription from Rome.
- Lucius Pacilius Rufio, former master of Lucius Pacilius Epaphra, father and son, and of Pacilia Fausta.
- Marcus Pacilius Rufus, a centurion in the fourth legion, stationed at Gorsium in Pannonia Inferior.
- Lucius Pacilius L. l. Septimus, a freedman, and the husband of Posilla Pacilia Vardaea, named in an inscription from Rome.
- Pacilia T. l. Severa, a freedwoman, was the wife of Quintus Titius, a veteran of the eighth legion, and mother of Quintus Titius Severus, buried at Aquileia in Venetia and Histria.
- Pacilius Severus, buried at Saepinum; Pacilia Capria dedicated a monument to him.
- Pacilius Silvanus, husband of Sossia Crescentina, named in an inscription from Rome.
- Publius Pacilius P. l. Silvanus, a freedman buried at Brundisium, aged sixty.
- Pacilia Sospita, buried at Rome.
- Pacilia Ↄ. l. Stephania, a freedwoman buried at Rome, aged twenty.
- Publius Pacilius P. l. Suavis, a freedman named in an inscription from Tibur.
- Lucius Pacilius Taurus, a priest of the Magna Mater, the Syrian goddess, and the mysteries of Isis, buried at Brundisium, aged sixty-five.
- Pacilia Cn. Techne, daughter of Gnaeus Pacilius Veteranus and Apolauste, buried at Thermae, aged two years, two months, and twenty-seven days.
- Pacilius Tychianus, a centurion in the second legion, stationed at Alexandria circa AD 222.
- Pacilius Vitalis, buried at Saepinum, with a monument dedicated by Pacilia Capria.
- Lucius Pacilius Vitalis, together with his mother, Asia Jucunda, dedicated a monument to his father at Rome.
- Posilla Pacilia C. l. Vardaea, a freedwoman, and wife of Lucius Pacilius Septimus, named in an inscription from Rome.
- Gnaeus Pacilius Veteranus, husband of Apolauste, and father of Pacilia and Pacilia Techne, named in funerary inscriptions from Rome and Thermae.
- Quintus Pacilius Q. f. Vitalis, dedicated a monument at Lambaesis to his father, Quintus Pacilius Mustianus.
- Publius Pacilius P. f. Zenon Laetus, an important magistrate at Nomentum.

== See also ==
- List of Roman gentes

== Bibliography ==
- Marcus Tullius Cicero, Epistulae ad Atticum, In Verrem.
- Dictionary of Greek and Roman Biography and Mythology, William Smith, ed., Little, Brown and Company, Boston (1849).
- Theodor Mommsen et alii, Corpus Inscriptionum Latinarum (The Body of Latin Inscriptions, abbreviated CIL), Berlin-Brandenburgische Akademie der Wissenschaften (1853–present).
- Giovanni Battista de Rossi, Inscriptiones Christianae Urbis Romanae Septimo Saeculo Antiquiores (Christian Inscriptions from Rome of the First Seven Centuries, abbreviated ICUR), Vatican Library, Rome (1857–1861, 1888).
- Notizie degli Scavi di Antichità (News of Excavations from Antiquity, abbreviated NSA), Accademia dei Lincei (1876–present).
- Bulletin Archéologique du Comité des Travaux Historiques et Scientifiques (Archaeological Bulletin of the Committee on Historic and Scientific Works, abbreviated BCTH), Imprimerie Nationale, Paris (1885–1973).
- René Cagnat et alii, L'Année épigraphique (The Year in Epigraphy, abbreviated AE), Presses Universitaires de France (1888–present).
- Epigraphica, Rivista Italiana di Epigrafia (1939–present).
- Alfred Merlin, Inscriptions Latines de La Tunisie (Latin Inscriptions from Tunisia, abbreviated ILTun), Fondation Dourlans, Paris (1944).
- Peter Pilhofer, Philippi, Band 2: Katalog der Inschriften von Philippi (Catalog of Inscriptions from Philippi, abbreviated Philippi), Tübingen (2nd Edition, 2009).
