= Gnaeus Domitius Lucanus =

1st century AD Roman senator and consul

Gnaeus Domitius Lucanus was a Roman senator and military commander active in the first century AD. His full name is Gnaeus Domitius Afer Titius Marcellus Curvius Lucanus. He was suffect consul sometime between 76 and 78.

== Early life ==
Lucanus was the son of Sextus Curvius Tullus of Gallia Narbonensis, and a woman whose name likely was Titia Marcella. The historian has proposed that Lucanus and his brother Tullus were adopted by a relative named Marcus Epidius Titius Marcellus.

Pliny the Younger explains that their father had been prosecuted by the orator Gnaeus Domitius Afer, who was successful in stripping the elder Tullus of his citizenship and wealth; however Afer then made both Lucanus and his brother Gnaeus Domitius Tullus his testamentary heirs, leaving them his fortune on the condition they took his family name as theirs.

== Career ==
His cursus honorum is recorded in two inscriptions, and provides an outline of his life. Lucanus started his senatorial career likely in his teens as a member of the quattuorviri viarum curandarum, one of the four boards of the vigintiviri, a minor collegium young senators serve in at the start of their careers. This was followed by service as a military tribune with Legio V Alaudae on the Rhine frontier, the same legion his brother Tullus served in. Lucanus then was elected quaestor assisting the proconsular governor of Africa. Upon completion of this traditional Republican magistracy, Lucanus would be enrolled in the Senate. Returning to Rome, he proceeded through the next traditional Republican magistracies, plebeian tribune and praetor.

After his praetorship, Lucanus and his brother were appointed legati legiones, or commanders, of Legio III Augusta, a posting that included governing the province of Numidia, from the year 70 to 73; Werner Eck suggests Lucanus handled the civilian responsibilities while Tullus commanded the legion. After this, he and his brother were adlected into the Patrician class by the emperors Vespasian and Titus in 72/73. The exact reason for their elevation is not recorded, but during their censorship Vespasian and Titus promoted a number of people either to the Senate or as Patricians for their support during the Year of Four Emperors.

Following his adlectio, Lucanus served as prefect over a vexillation of soldiers who campaigned against German tribes, and for his success he received dona militaria, or military awards, appropriate to his rank. This was followed by his admission into the Septemviri epulonum, one of the four most prestigious ancient Roman priesthoods. Then he was appointed proconsular governor of Africa, assisted by his brother Tullus as his legatus in 84/85.

== Family ==
If the fact that Lucanus and Tullus held the same office at the same time was not sufficient evidence that these brothers were very close, then Pliny's letter written following Tullus' death from years of living as an invalid, where he gives a clear example of their loyalty to each other, would provide it.

Lucanus married the daughter of Titus Curtilius Mancia, suffect consul in 55; her name is not recorded. Together they had a daughter, Domitia Lucilla Maior. However Mancia developed a hatred for Lucanus, and offered to make Lucilla his heir only if Lucanus released her from his power as paterfamilias; this would prevent Lucanus from benefiting from the inheritance. This Lucanus did, only to have his brother and her uncle Tullus then adopt her.

Domitia Lucilla would later marry Publius Calvisius Tullus Ruso, and their daughter Domitia Calvilla was the mother of the emperor Marcus Aurelius.

Lucanus may have remarried to Domitia Longina.

== See also ==
- List of Roman consuls
- Curvia gens
