= Julius Africanus (orator) =

1st century Roman orator in the reign of Nero

Julius Africanus was a celebrated orator in the reign of Nero, and seems to have been the son of the Julius Africanus, of the Gallic state of the Santoni (in present-day France), who was condemned by Tiberius in 32 AD. Quintilian, who had heard Julius Africanus, spoke of him and Domitius Afer as the best orators of their time. The eloquence of Africanus was chiefly characterized by vehemence and energy. Pliny the Younger mentions a grandson of this Julius Africanus, who was also an advocate and was opposed to him upon one occasion.

There is a persistent belief in some quarters that Africanus was actually an African. However, being the son of a Gallic chief he was a member of a Celtic tribe. This confusion probably arises from an incorrect belief that the Roman cognomen Africanus means from Africa (i.e. born in Africa) rather than the correct meaning of having some relation to Africa. The cognomen Africanus originated with Scipio Africanus, who defeated Carthage (in North Africa) during the Second Punic War.
