= Pacidia gens =

Ancient Roman family

The gens Pacidia was an obscure plebeian or patrician family at ancient Rome. Few members of this gens are mentioned by the historians, but a number are known from inscriptions. The most notable may have been the two Pacidii who were commanders in the army of Gnaeus Pompeius Magnus during the Civil War.

== Origin ==
The nomen Pacidius belongs to a class of gentilicia formed from other names, using the suffix -idius. Normally such names would be formed from names ending in -idus, but in this case no corresponding name Pacidus is known, and the suffix was chosen arbitrarily without a direct morphological relationship to the original name. The root of the nomen is probably the Oscan praenomen Paccius, which was also used as a gentile name. Pacidius would therefore be cognate with the nomen Paccius, and probably also with Pacilius. If the name is derived from the Oscan praenomen Paccius, then the Paccii would be an Oscan family, perhaps of Samnite origin. This seems quite probable, given the fact that most of the inscriptions bearing this name are concentrated in and around Samnium. However, in at least some cases it is likely that Pacidius is instead an orthographic variation of Placidius, derived from the Latin cognomen Placidus, "peaceful".

== Praenomina ==
Despite the relatively small number of Pacidii known, it seems that they favoured the praenomina Publius and Gaius, and perhaps also Lucius, three of the most common names throughout Roman history. They also used Numerius, which although relatively uncommon at Rome, was frequently used by Oscan-speaking peoples, such as the Sabines and Samnites.

== Members ==
This list includes abbreviated praenomina. For an explanation of this practice, see filiation.

- Pacidius, one of the generals under the command of Quintus Caecilius Metellus Scipio during the African War. Together with Titus Labienus and a second Pacidius, he was one of the Pompeian commanders at the Battle of Ruspina. He seems to be the same person as the Placidius who was badly wounded at the battle of Tegea.
- Pacidius, the second general of this name under the command of Metellus Scipio during the African War. He was one of the Pompeian commanders at Ruspina, but is not mentioned again, and his fate is unknown.
- Lucius Pacidius P. f., mentioned in an inscription found at Cellino Attanasio, formerly in Picenum.
- Pacidia N. f. Gavia, named in an inscription found at Capistrello, formerly in the territory of the Aequi.
- Pacidia Methe, wife of Publius Didius Philotimus, with whom she dedicated a tomb at Larinum in Samnium to their daughter, Didia Maxima, aged eighteen.
- Publius Pacidius (C. l.?) Philadelphus, probably a freedman, buried at Rome.
- Gaius Pacidius C. l. Pindarus, a freedman mentioned in an inscription from Privernum in Latium.
- Pacidia Procula, named in an inscription from Uscosium in Samnium.

== See also ==
- List of Roman gentes

== Bibliography ==
- Gaius Julius Caesar (attributed), De Bello Africo (On the African War).
- Dictionary of Greek and Roman Biography and Mythology, William Smith, ed., Little, Brown and Company, Boston (1849).
- Theodor Mommsen et alii, Corpus Inscriptionum Latinarum (The Body of Latin Inscriptions, abbreviated CIL), Berlin-Brandenburgische Akademie der Wissenschaften (1853–present).
- René Cagnat et alii, L'Année épigraphique (The Year in Epigraphy, abbreviated AE), Presses Universitaires de France (1888–present).
- Rosanna Friggeri and Carla Pelli, "Vivo e Morto nelle iscrizioni di Roma" (The Living and the Dead in the Inscriptions of Rome, abbreviated "Vivo"), in Miscellanea, pp. 95–172, Rome (1980).
- Napoleone Stelluti, Epigrafi di Larino e della bassa Frentania (Epigraphy of Larinum and Lower Frentania), Editrice Lampo, Campobasso (1997).
