= Cestia gens =

Ancient Roman family

The gens Cestia was a plebeian family at ancient Rome during the later Republic, and in imperial times. The first member of the gens to obtain the consulship was Gaius Cestius Gallus in AD 35. The family's name is commemorated on two monuments, the Pons Cestius and the Pyramid of Cestius which survive into modern times.

== Origin ==
The nomen Cestius seems to be derived from the cognomen Cestus, referring to an open-fingered boxing glove, or to a girdle. The Cestii probably of Latin origin. Although the surname Gallus, borne by two of the family, might point to a Gallic origin, another surname of the Cestii, Camerinus, suggests that the Cestii might have claimed descent from the ancient Latin city of Cameria. At least two other prominent families, the Sulpicii and the Coruncanii, seem to have come from Cameria. However, the name might also indicate that some of the Cestii claimed descent from the great patrician house of the Sulpicii, who had long used this surname.

== Praenomina ==
The praenomina used by the Cestii included Gaius, Lucius, Numerius, Publius, and Titus. Except for Numerius, all of these were among the most common names throughout Roman history.

== Branches and cognomina ==
The Cestii do not appear to have been divided into distinct families. The cognomina Gallus, Macedonicus, Proculus, and Severus were probably personal surnames, as was Pius, a rhetorician and a native of Smyrna, who was perhaps a freedman of the gens. Gallus refers to a cockerel, or to someone of Gallic extraction. Macedonicus alluded to the military service of one of the Cestii in Macedonia, while Proculus was an old praenomen that came to be used as a surname in many families. Severus was a common surname meaning "grave, serious," or "severe", while Pius referred to a person known for being dutiful or pious.

== Members ==
This list includes abbreviated praenomina. For an explanation of this practice, see filiation.

=== Cestii Galli ===
- Gaius Cestius Gallus, surnamed Camerinus, was a senator, and consul suffectus in AD 35.
- Gaius Cestius C. f. Gallus, consul suffectus in AD 42, and governor of Syria, he failed to quash the revolt of the Jews circa AD 64 and 65, and was removed from his command. He apparently died before the arrival of his successor.
- Lucius Cestius Gallus, commander of Legio XX Valeria Victrix and proconsul of Gallia Narbonensis under Marcus Aurelius.
- Lucius Cestius Gallus Gallus Varenianus Lutatius Natalis Aemilianus, possible son of Lucius and patron of Gaulus in Sicily.

=== Others ===
- Lucius Cestius, father of the Gaius Cestius for whom the Pyramid of Cestius was erected. A Lucius Cestius, perhaps the same person, was triumvir monetalis circa 43 BC.
- Gaius Cestius, praetor in 44 BC, he belonged to the aristocratic party, and refused the offer of a province from Marcus Antonius. He may be the same as the Gaius Cestius mentioned by Cicero in a letter to Atticus in 51, and the Cestius mentioned in the oration Pro Flacco in 59. He is probably the Cestius who perished in the proscriptions of 43 BC.
- Cestius Macedonicus, a native of Perusia, acquired his surname on account of his service in Macedonia. When Perusia was taken by Octavian in 41 BC, he determined to destroy himself by fire, and setting his house ablaze, stabbed himself, then leaped into the flames. The fire spread to adjacent structures, ultimately destroying much of the town.
- Gaius Cestius L. f., praetor, tribune of the plebs, and member of the septemviri epulones. The Pyramid of Cestius was erected in his honor, apparently during the reign of Augustus. He may be identical with one of the Cestii mentioned by Cicero.
- Lucius Cestius Pius, a native of Smyrna, who taught rhetoric at Rome, and was known for replying to Cicero with public speeches of his own. He is mentioned by both Seneca and Quintilian, neither of whom held a high opinion of him.
- Cestius Cordus, governor of Creta et Cyrenaica circa AD 21.
- Numerius Cestius, consul suffectus in AD 55, succeeding the emperor Nero on the Kalends of March, and serving until the Kalends of May.
- Cestius Proculus, was accused of repetundae in AD 56, but acquitted.
- Cestius Severus, a notorious delator during the reign of Nero.

== See also ==
- List of Roman gentes

== Bibliography ==
- Marcus Tullius Cicero, Epistulae ad Atticum, Philippicae, Pro Flacco.
- Marcus Velleius Paterculus, Compendium of Roman History.
- Lucius Annaeus Seneca (Seneca the Elder), Controversiae.
- Gaius Plinius Secundus (Pliny the Elder), Historia Naturalis (Natural History).
- Marcus Fabius Quintilianus (Quintilian), Institutio Oratoria (Institutes of Oratory).
- Flavius Josephus, Vita Flavii Josephi (The Life of Flavius Josephus), Bellum Judaïcum (The Jewish War).
- Publius Cornelius Tacitus, Annales, Historiae
- Gaius Suetonius Tranquillus, De Vita Caesarum (Lives of the Caesars, or The Twelve Caesars)..
- Appianus Alexandrinus (Appian), Bellum Civile (The Civil War).
- Lucius Cassius Dio Cocceianus (Cassius Dio), Roman History.
- Eusebius Sophronius Hieronymus (St. Jerome), In Chronicon Eusebii (The Chronicon of Eusebius).
- Joseph Hilarius Eckhel, Doctrina Numorum Veterum (The Study of Ancient Coins, 1792–1798).
- Henricus Meyerus (Heinrich Meyer), Oratorum Romanorum Fragmenta ab Appio inde Caeco usque ad Q. Aurelium Symmachum (Fragments of Roman Orators from Appius Claudius Caecus to Quintus Aurelius Symmachus), L. Bourgeois-Mazé, Paris (1837).
- Dictionary of Greek and Roman Biography and Mythology, William Smith, ed., Little, Brown and Company, Boston (1849).
- Theodor Mommsen et alii, Corpus Inscriptionum Latinarum (The Body of Latin Inscriptions, abbreviated CIL), Berlin-Brandenburgische Akademie der Wissenschaften (1853–present).
- George Davis Chase, "The Origin of Roman Praenomina", in Harvard Studies in Classical Philology, vol. VIII (1897).
- D. P. Simpson, Cassell's Latin and English Dictionary, Macmillan Publishing Company, New York (1963).
- Paul A. Gallivan, "Some Comments on the Fasti for the Reign of Nero", in Classical Quarterly, vol. 24, pp. 290–311 (1974).
