= Palfuria gens =

Ancient Roman family

The gens Palfuria was an obscure plebeian family at ancient Rome. Members of this gens are first mentioned during the first century of the Empire. The most illustrious of the family was Publius Palfurius, who held the consulship in AD 55.

== Origin ==
The nomen Palfurius Seems to belong to a class of gentilicia formed using various less-common suffixes, such as -urius, perhaps from an earlier form ending in -usius. Other nomina sharing a similar morphology include Furius and Veturius, originally Fusius and Vetusius.

== Branches and cognomina ==
The only distinct family of the Palfurii bore the cognomen Sura, originally designating someone with prominent calves.

== Members ==
This list includes abbreviated praenomina. For an explanation of this practice, see filiation.

- Publius Palfurius, consul suffectus ex Kal. Sept. in AD 55, early in the reign of Nero.
- Marcus Palfurius P. f. Sura, described by Juvenal as a lawyer serving the imperial treasury. He was banished, and Domitian refused to hear a popular request for his recall.
- Titus Palfurius Sura, one of the quattuorviri quinquennalis at Sybaris during the second half of the first century.
- Palfuria Eutychia, a freedwoman, and the wife of Lucius Palfurius Mercurius, buried at Rome.
- Lucius Palfurius Mercurius, the husband of Palfuria Eutychia, to whom a monument was dedicated at Rome.
- Palfuria D. l. Roda, a freedwoman named in an inscription from Rome.
- Titus Palfurius Marcellinus, the husband of Ennia Procula, and father of Titus Palfurius Marcianus and Gaius Ennius Marcellinus, who dedicated a monument to their father at the current site of Brecciasecca in Samnium.
- Titus Palfurius T. f. Marcianus, the son of Titus Palfurius Marcellinus and Ennia Procula, known from a funerary inscription found at Brecciasecca.
- Palfurius Sura, according to Trebellius Pollio, kept an account of the acts of the emperor Gallienus.
- Palfurius Latro, imprisoned and slain by the emperor Probus.

== See also ==
- List of Roman gentes

== Bibliography ==
- Decimus Junius Juvenalis, Satirae (Satires).
- Gaius Suetonius Tranquillus, De Vita Caesarum (Lives of the Caesars, or The Twelve Caesars).
- Aelius Lampridius, Aelius Spartianus, Flavius Vopiscus, Julius Capitolinus, Trebellius Pollio, and Vulcatius Gallicanus, Historia Augusta (Augustan History).
- Dictionary of Greek and Roman Biography and Mythology, William Smith, ed., Little, Brown and Company, Boston (1849).
- Theodor Mommsen et alii, Corpus Inscriptionum Latinarum (The Body of Latin Inscriptions, abbreviated CIL), Berlin-Brandenburgische Akademie der Wissenschaften (1853–present).
- René Cagnat et alii, L'Année épigraphique (The Year in Epigraphy, abbreviated AE), Presses Universitaires de France (1888–present).
- George Davis Chase, "The Origin of Roman Praenomina", in Harvard Studies in Classical Philology, vol. VIII (1897).
- Paul von Rohden, Elimar Klebs, & Hermann Dessau, Prosopographia Imperii Romani (The Prosopography of the Roman Empire, abbreviated PIR), Berlin (1898).
