= Paconia gens =

Ancient Roman family

The gens Paconia was a minor plebeian family at ancient Rome. No members of this gens obtained any of the higher offices of the Roman state in the time of the Republic, but Aulus Paconius Sabinus held the consulship in AD 58, during the reign of Nero.

== Origin ==
The nomen Paconius belongs to a class of gentilicia formed using the suffix -onius, which were originally derived from other names ending in -o, although later the suffix came to be regarded as a regular gentile-forming suffix in other cases. In this instance, the root of the name is probably the Oscan praenomen Paccius, which would make it cognate with Paccius, Pacilia, and perhaps Pacidia.

== Members ==
This list includes abbreviated praenomina. For an explanation of this practice, see filiation.

- Marcus Paconius, an eques, whose property was confiscated by Publius Clodius Pulcher during his time as tribune of the plebs.
- Paconius, a native of Mysia or Phrygia, whose complaints about Quintus Tullius Cicero were discussed in correspondence with his brother, Marcus. His name is uncertain, and should perhaps be Paeonius.
- Marcus Paconius, a legate under the command of Gaius Junius Silanus, proconsul of Asia in AD 22. Paconius accused the proconsul of malversation, a charge which led to Silanus' exile. But soon afterward, Paconius himself was charged with treason, and put to death.
- Aulus Paconius Sabinus, consul suffectus for the final months of AD 58.
- Quintus Paconius M. f. Agrippinus, a Stoic philosopher, praised by Epictetus and Arrian. During the reign of Nero, he was accused together with Thrasea, and banished from Italy.
- Paconia Q. f. M. n. Agrippina, married Lucius Dercius.

== See also ==
- List of Roman gentes

== Bibliography ==
- Marcus Tullius Cicero, Epistulae ad Quintum Fratrem, Pro Milone.
- Publius Cornelius Tacitus, Annales.
- Gaius Suetonius Tranquillus, De Vita Caesarum (Lives of the Caesars, or The Twelve Caesars).
- Dictionary of Greek and Roman Biography and Mythology, William Smith, ed., Little, Brown and Company, Boston (1849).
- George Davis Chase, "The Origin of Roman Praenomina", in Harvard Studies in Classical Philology, vol. VIII (1897).
- Paul von Rohden, Elimar Klebs, & Hermann Dessau, Prosopographia Imperii Romani (The Prosopography of the Roman Empire, abbreviated PIR), Berlin (1898).
