= Paccia gens =

Ancient Roman family

The gens Paccia, occasionally written Pactia, was a minor plebeian family at ancient Rome. Only a few members of this gens achieved distinction in the Roman state, of whom the most illustrious was Gaius Paccius Africanus, consul in AD 67.

== Origin ==
The nomen Paccius is a patronymic surname, derived from an Oscan praenomen, found as Paccius or Paquius, frequently found among the Samnites. The Roman Paccii would therefore seem to have been of Samnite, or at least Oscan descent. Because the praenomen and the gentile name shared the same form, it is difficult to determine in some cases whether the name was the bearer's praenomen or nomen.

== Members ==
This list includes abbreviated praenomina. For an explanation of this practice, see filiation.

- Marcus Paccius, described by Cicero as a friend of Titus Pomponius Atticus.
- Paccius Antiochus, a physician who lived during the early part of the first century. He was a student of Philonides of Catana, and was well known for his medicinal preparations, some of which were quoted by Galen. He became wealthy from the sale of a particular medicine, the formula of which he left to the emperor Tiberius.
- Paccius Orfitus, a centurion primus pilus in the army of Gnaeus Domitius Corbulo, during the reign of Nero.
- Gaius Paccius Africanus, consul suffectus ex Kal. Jul. in AD 67. He was an ally of the emperor Vitellius, and was expelled from the senate after the emperor's death; restored to favour under Vespasian, Paccius was appointed Proconsul of Africa in 77.
- Gaius Paccius C. f., one of the decemvirs charged with holding a religious festival at Tarracina in Latium.
- Gaius Paccius C. l. Anoptes, a freedman mentioned in an inscription from Tarracina.
- Marcus Paccius Silvanus Quintus Coredius Gallus Gargilius Antiquus, consul suffectus from May to June in AD 119.
- Paccia Marciana, the first wife of Septimius Severus, died before her husband became emperor.

== See also ==
- List of Roman gentes

== Bibliography ==
- Marcus Tullius Cicero, Epistulae ad Atticum.
- Scribonius Largus, De Compositione Medicamentorum (On the Composition of Medicines).
- Publius Cornelius Tacitus, Annales, Historiae.
- Aelius Galenus (Galen), De Compositione Medicamentorum Secundum Locos Conscriptorum (On the Composition of Medications According to the Place Prescribed), De Compositione Medicamentorum per Genera (On the Composition of Medications According to their Kind).
- Aelius Lampridius, Aelius Spartianus, Flavius Vopiscus, Julius Capitolinus, Trebellius Pollio, and Vulcatius Gallicanus, Historia Augusta (Augustan History).
- Marcellus Empiricus, De Medicamentis Empiricis, Physicis, et Rationabilibus (Concerning Medicines, Natural Science, and Reasoning).
- Aëtius Amidenus, Biblia Iatrika (Books of Medicine).
- Dictionary of Greek and Roman Biography and Mythology, William Smith, ed., Little, Brown and Company, Boston (1849).
- Theodor Mommsen et alii, Corpus Inscriptionum Latinarum (The Body of Latin Inscriptions, abbreviated CIL), Berlin-Brandenburgische Akademie der Wissenschaften (1853–present).
- George Davis Chase, "The Origin of Roman Praenomina", in Harvard Studies in Classical Philology, vol. VIII (1897).
- Paul von Rohden, Elimar Klebs, & Hermann Dessau, Prosopographia Imperii Romani (The Prosopography of the Roman Empire, abbreviated PIR), Berlin (1898).
- T. Robert S. Broughton, The Magistrates of the Roman Republic, American Philological Association (1952).
- Paul A. Gallivan, "Some Comments on the Fasti for the Reign of Nero", in Classical Quarterly, vol. 24, pp. 290–311 (1974).
- Werner Eck and Andreas Pangerl, "Neue Diplome mit den Namen von Konsuln und Statthaltern", in Zeitschrift für Papyrologie und Epigraphik, vol. 187 (2013).
