= Stoic Opposition =

1st-century Roman Stoic philosophers opposed to the autocratic rule of certain emperors

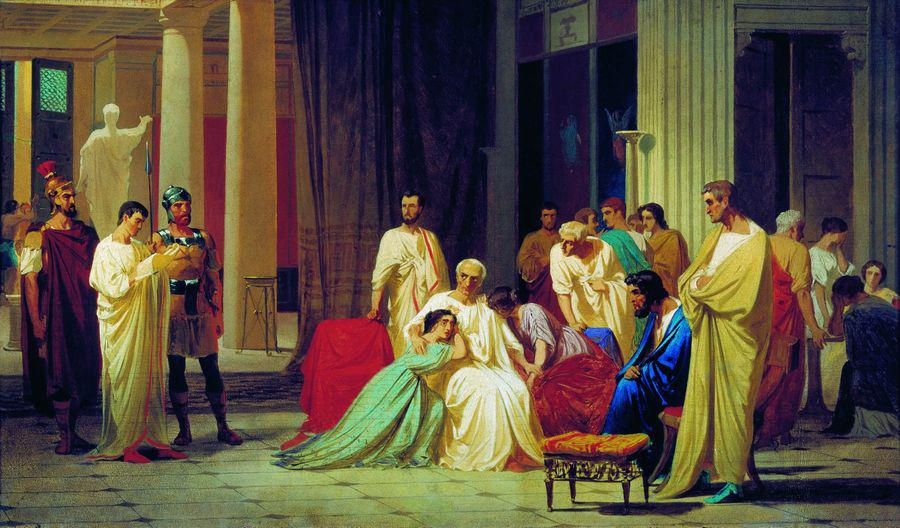
Quaestor Reading the Death Sentence to Senator Thrasea Paetus, by Fyodor Bronnikov, Radischev Art Museum

The Stoic Opposition is the name given to a group of Stoic philosophers who actively opposed the autocratic rule of certain emperors in the 1st-century, particularly Nero and Domitian. Most prominent among them was Thrasea Paetus, an influential Roman senator executed by Nero. They were held in high regard by the later Stoics Epictetus and Marcus Aurelius. Thrasea, Rubellius Plautus and Barea Soranus were reputedly students of the famous Stoic teacher Musonius Rufus and as all three were executed by Nero they became known collectively as the Stoic martyrs.

== Concept ==
The concept of a "Stoic opposition" dates back to the 19th century and the work of Gaston Boissier. He proposed the theory that the opposition to the emperors in the 1st century was predominantly led by Stoics who opposed the arbitrary use of power and instead favored a coherent philosophical rule. The opposition began under Nero, and continued under the Flavian emperors, primarily Vespasian and Domitian, provoking the trials of Stoic senators and the expulsions of philosophers from Rome. This idea was elaborated upon and extended in the 20th century by writers drawing on the textual evidence showing how Stoic doctrines were regarded as politically suspicious throughout this period.

In recent years this idea of a coherent Stoic opposition has been criticized. It has been noted that surviving Stoic texts say relatively little about political theory, beyond the desire for a well-run state. Many of the figures named in the Stoic opposition were part of the Senatorial class who were vulnerable to imperial authority, and desired the restoration of their own power and privilege. Many people were undoubtedly persecuted for whom there was little to no evidence of an adherence to Stoicism. Against these views it has been noted that the Stoics emphasized morally correct behaviour (virtue) as the only true good; whereas any form of morally deplorable behaviour was considered the only true evil. Stoic doctrine favoured an active engagement in political life, and certainly acted as support for political opponents during the period.

== History ==
=== Precursors ===
In the 1st century BC the Stoic senator Cato the Younger had opposed Julius Caesar in the civil war of 49–45 BC. Following his defeat at the Battle of Thapsus, Cato chose to commit suicide rather than submit to life under Caesar's rule. Cato would become eulogised by the prominent Stoics who came after him as a symbol opposed to autocratic rule. For Seneca he was an official Stoic role-model whose martyrdom was reminiscent of Socrates' death. Similarly he was represented as the one consistent hero figure in Lucan's De Bello Civili.

=== Under Nero ===
The first of the Stoics to fall victim under Nero was Rubellius Plautus, a distant cousin of the emperor. As a potential rival to the increasingly paranoid emperor, Nero exiled him to Asia Minor in 60 AD. He was accompanied into exile by the Stoic philosopher Musonius Rufus. Two years later the Praetorian prefect, Tigellinus, frightened Nero with the accusation that Plautus "had the arrogance of the Stoics, who breed sedition and intrigue". Under the advice of Musonius, Plautus chose to await death rather than flee into a precarious life, and a centurion sent from Rome assassinated him as he stripped for his routine noon exercise.

In 65 AD one of Nero's secretaries named Epaphroditus, the owner of Epictetus, reported the Pisonian conspiracy to Nero, and was greatly rewarded for doing so. The aftermath saw Seneca and his nephew Lucan both separately forced to commit suicide. Musonius Rufus, who had returned to Rome following the death of Plautus, was once again exiled, apparently for his fame as teacher of philosophy. This time he was exiled to the island of Gyarus, where he worked the soil with the students who had accompanied him into exile.

Around 66 AD, Thrasea Paetus, an influential Roman senator and like Plautus a friend and follower of Musonius Rufus, was placed on trial for treason. Thrasea's crime was a campaign of abstention which included: general non-attendance at the Roman Senate; non-participation in the senatorial oath to the Emperor at the beginning of each year; evading the priestly oath for the emperor, even while holding a priesthood; absenting himself from the vote of divine honours to Poppaea, nor attending her funeral; and never offering a sacrifice for the welfare of the emperor. According to Tacitus, Nero's hostility to Thrasea was stirred-up by Cossutianus Capito who specifically attacked Thrasea because he was a Stoic, a sect hostile to autocracy and which openly disapproved of the Emperor's conduct:

Either let us pass over to his creed, if it is the better, or let these seekers after a new world lose their chief and their instigator. It is the sect that ... subverts the empire, they make a parade of liberty: the empire overthrown, they will lay hands on liberty itself. You have removed Cassius to little purpose, if you intend to allow these rivals of the Bruti to multiply and flourish!

— Cossutianus Capito, quoted in Tacitus, Annals, xvi. 22

Thrasea was sentenced to death. His friend Arulenus Rusticus was Tribune of the plebs at this time and offered to place his veto upon the senatus consultum, but Thrasea prevented him as he would only have brought certain destruction upon himself without saving Thrasea. Thrasea's son-in-law Helvidius Priscus, and his friend Paconius Agrippinus, were put on trial at the same time as Thrasea; both men were prominent Stoics and both were sentenced to exile. Agrippinus was later praised by Epictetus for the imperturbility in which he accepted his sentence.

Another Stoic follower of Musonius Rufus, Barea Soranus (a distant relative of later Emperor Marcus Aurelius), was also put on trial in 65 or 66. He was charged with friendship with Rubellius Plautus and with popularity hunting whilst proconsul of Asia with an intent of stirring revolt. His daughter, Servilia, was also accused of having consulted a sorcerer (magi) and was tried together with her father. Both were condemned to death (in 65 or 66), and allowed to commit suicide.

Publius Egnatius Celer was the Stoic teacher, who taught and then was paid off to make false accusations against Barea Soranus. He was later accused by Musonius Rufus, the teacher of Epictetus, whom scholars believe to be alluding to the incident in this passage:

Thus a friend is overpowered by the testimony of a philosopher: thus a philosopher becomes a parasite; thus he lets himself for hire for money: thus in the senate a man does not say what he thinks; in private (in the school) he proclaims his opinions.

=== Under Vespasian ===
During the reign of Vespasian the philosophical schools, and the Stoics in particular, were still seen as a political threat. One of his first acts (in 71 or 72) was to banish philosophers from the city of Rome. Musonius Rufus was allowed to remain at first, because he was so highly regarded, but was later banished as well, sometime around 75 AD. Musonius travelled to Syria, returning to Rome only after Vespasian's death in 79 AD.

Although Vespasian tried to present himself as a merciful ruler, he faced opposition from Helvidius Priscus who opposed imperial power, denounced kingship and hereditary succession, and was a fierce proponent of senatorial rights. Helvidius was eventually executed by Vespasian. Epictetus praised Priscus for defying Vespasian's order that he should not go into the Senate.

=== Under Domitian ===
In 93 AD seven people were brought to trial for insulting the emperor Domitian. Three were put to death, Arulenus Rusticus, Herennius Senecio, and Helvidius Priscus (son of the elder Helvidius Priscus). Although he was appointed suffect consul just a year earlier, Arulenus Rusticus was executed because he had written a panegyric in praise of Thrasea.

When I was once lecturing in Rome, that famous Rusticus, whom Domitian later killed through envy at his repute, was among my hearers, and a soldier came through the audience and delivered to him a letter from the emperor. There was a silence and I, too, made a pause, that he might read his letter; but he refused and did not break the seal until I had finished my lecture and the audience had dispersed. Because of this incident everyone admired the dignity of the man.

Likewise Priscus' widow, Fannia, the daughter of Thrasea, requested that Herennius Senecio compose a panegyric in praise of her deceased husband, using copies of his diaries that she possessed. This led to the execution of Senecio and the exile of Fannia. Helvidius the younger, on the other hand, wrote a play about Paris and Oenone that was interpreted as a satire on the marriage of Domitian and his wife Domitia, and was likewise sentenced to death.

Domitian was suspicious of dissent from the philosophical schools: he had apparently expelled philosophers in 88/9 and did so again in 93/4 when he expelled the philosophers not only from the city of Rome but from all of Italy. The most famous of the expelled philosophers was Epictetus who moved to Nicopolis, in Greece, where he set up his successful school, and became one of the most famous Stoic philosophers. As mentioned above, Epictetus had been owned by Epaphroditus, the secretary of Nero who reported the Pisonian Conspiracy to Nero, which led to a purge. In the Discourses, Epictetus repeatedly praises Paconius Agrippinus and Helvidius Priscus, prominent members of the Stoic Opposition, to his Stoic students and encourages them to follow their moral example.

== Later influence ==
The emperor Marcus Aurelius trained in Stoic philosophy from an early age. He had several Stoic tutors but the most prominent among them was Junius Rusticus, a direct descendant of Arulenus Rusticus. In The Meditations, Marcus refers to Nero as a tyrant. He thanks his Aristotelian tutor, Claudius Severus, for introducing him to the political ideals of Stoic republicans, including Thrasea and Helvidius Priscus.

[...] that through him I came to know Thrasea, Helvidius, Cato, Dio, Brutus, and to conceive the idea of a balanced constitution, and of government founded on equity and freedom of speech, and of a monarchy which values above all things the freedom of the subject.

The Dio referred to in this passage may be Dio Chrysostom, a Stoic-influenced rhetorician and student of Musonius Rufus, who was banished from Rome by Emperor Domitian in 82 AD for advising one of his relatives. He was good friends with Nerva and returned to Rome when he was acclaimed emperor. He was also friends with the Stoic philosopher Euphrates of Tyre, a fellow-student of Musonius Rufus.
