= AD 93 =

AD 93 in various calendars
- Gregorian calendar: AD 93; XCIII
- Ab urbe condita: 846
- Assyrian calendar: 4843
- Balinese saka calendar: 14–15
- Bengali calendar: −501 – −500
- Berber calendar: 1043
- Buddhist calendar: 637
- Burmese calendar: −545
- Byzantine calendar: 5601–5602
- Chinese calendar: 壬辰年 (Water Dragon); 2790 or 2583 — to — 癸巳年 (Water Snake); 2791 or 2584
- Coptic calendar: −191 – −190
- Discordian calendar: 1259
- Ethiopian calendar: 85–86
- Hebrew calendar: 3853–3854
- Hindu calendars
- Vikram Samvat: 149–150
- Shaka Samvat: 14–15
- Kali Yuga: 3193–3194
- Holocene calendar: 10093
- Iranian calendar: 529 BP – 528 BP
- Islamic calendar: 545 BH – 544 BH
- Javanese calendar: N/A
- Julian calendar: AD 93; XCIII
- Korean calendar: 2426
- Minguo calendar: 1819 before ROC 民前1819年
- Nanakshahi calendar: −1375
- Seleucid era: 404/405 AG
- Thai solar calendar: 635–636
- Tibetan calendar: ཆུ་ཕོ་འབྲུག་ལོ་ (male Water-Dragon); 219 or −162 or −934 — to — ཆུ་མོ་སྦྲུལ་ལོ་ (female Water-Snake); 220 or −161 or −933

AD 93 (XCIII) was a common year starting on Tuesday of the Julian calendar. At the time, it was known as the Year of the Consulship of Pompeius and Priscinus (or, less frequently, year 846 Ab urbe condita). The denomination AD 93 for this year has been used since the early medieval period, when the Anno Domini calendar era became the prevalent method in Europe for naming years.

== Events ==
=== By place ===
==== Roman Empire ====
- Emperor Domitian persecutes the Christians.
- Pliny the Younger is named a praetor.

==== Asia ====
- The Xianbei incorporates 100,000 Xiongnu, and establishes the Xianbei state in Mongolia (approximate date).

=== By topic ===
==== Literature ====
- Josephus completes his Jewish Antiquities (or in AD 94).

== Deaths ==
- August 23 – Gnaeus Julius Agricola, Roman general and governor (b. AD 40)
- Arulenus Rusticus, Roman politician and Stoic philosopher (executed)
- Herennius Senecio, Roman Stoic philosopher and writer (executed)
- Lucius Antistius Rusticus, Roman politician and governor
