= Arria the Younger =

Ancient Roman noblewoman of 1st century CE

Arria was a woman in ancient Rome of a prestigious family notable in political affairs -- though often on the bad side of the emperor -- throughout the first century CE.

She was a relative of the poet Persius. Her father, Aulus Caecina Paetus, was ordered by the emperor Claudius to commit suicide for his part in a rebellion, and her mother, also named Arria, was the subject of a notable anecdote about the affair in the letters of Pliny the Younger. Her mother later joined her husband in suicide.

She married Publius Clodius Thrasea Paetus. Together they had a daughter, named Fannia, who married the philosopher and magistrate Helvidius Priscus.

After Thrasea was sentenced to death by the emperor Nero in 67 CE, Arria wanted to follow her mother's example and prepared to die with him, but Thrasea forced her to stay alive to take care of their daughter.

Afterwards, mother and daughter left Rome with Priscus, who had been accused with Thrasea, but banished instead of condemned, though they returned in the year 68 when Nero was replaced with emperor Galba. In the year 75, Priscus was again banished by the emperor Vespasian, and Arria and Fannia again went with him, and again the trio returned after the banishing emperor died.

In 93, the emperor Domitian sentenced Arulenus Rusticus to death for praising Thrasea, and Domitian banished Arria and Fannia once more, ostensibly because they had commissioned a memoir in praise of Helvidius Priscus. Domitian also ordered the execution of the younger Helvidius Priscus, Fannia's stepson. Once more, the women outlived the emperor, and they returned from exile in 96, after Domitian's death.

It is unclear when exactly Arria died, but it was before Fannia.
