= Arria =

1st-century Roman woman

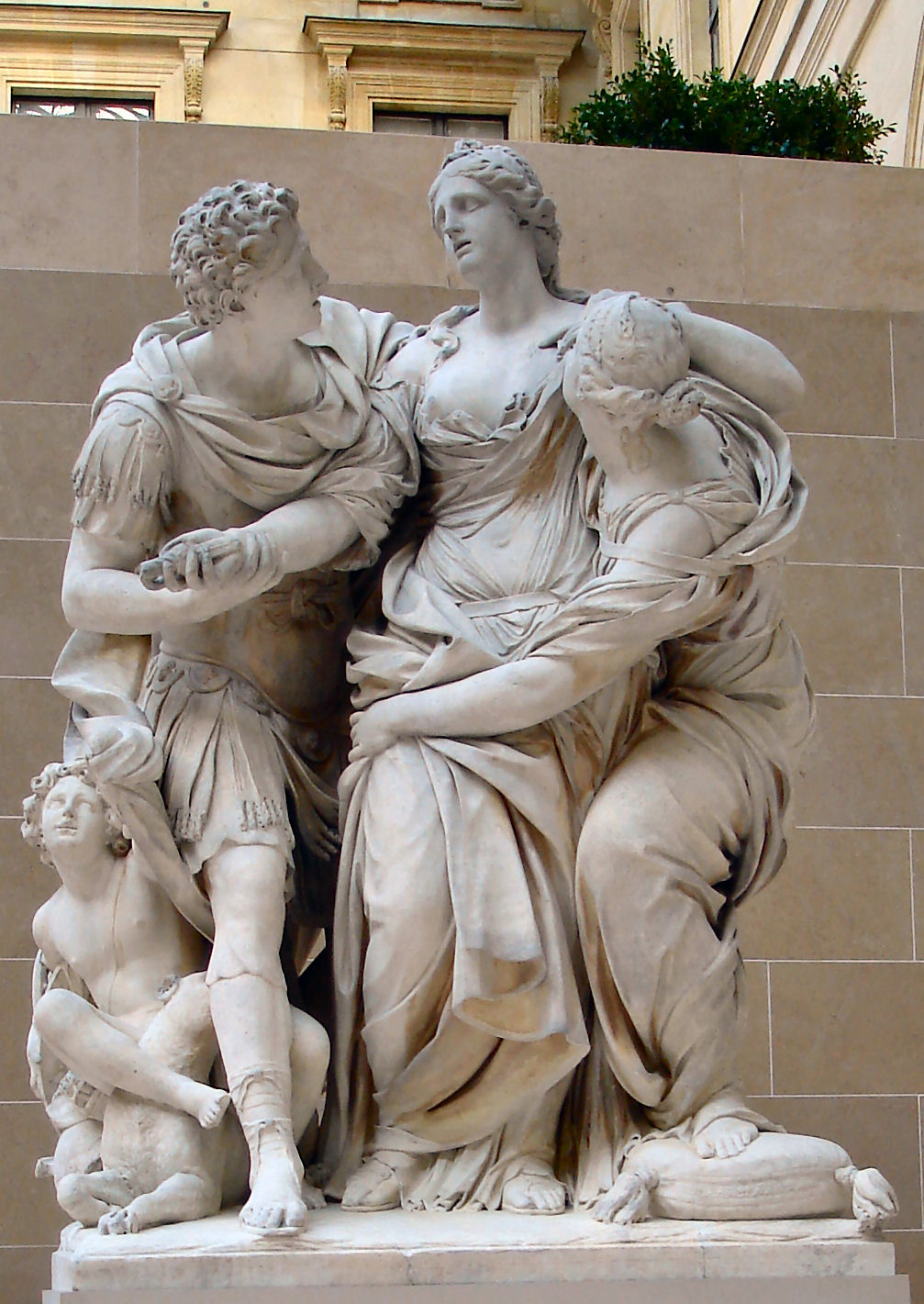
Arria et Paetus, sculpture by Pierre Lepautre and Jean-Baptiste Théodon, Musée du Louvre

Arria (also Arria Major) was a woman in ancient Rome. Her husband, Caecina Paetus, was ordered by the emperor Claudius to commit suicide for his part in a rebellion but was not capable of forcing himself to do so. Arria wrenched the dagger from him and stabbed herself, then returned it to her husband, telling him that it didn't hurt ("Paete, non dolet!"). Her story was recorded in the letters of Pliny the Younger, who obtained his information from Arria's granddaughter, Fannia.

== Biography ==
Pliny records that Arria's son died at the same time as Caecina Paetus was quite ill. She apparently arranged and planned the child's funeral without her husband even knowing of his death. Every time she visited her husband, Arria told him that the boy was improving. If emotion threatened to get the better of her, she excused herself from the room and would, in Pliny's words, "give herself to sorrow", and then return to her husband with a calm demeanor.

After the rebellion against Claudius led by Lucius Arruntius Camillus Scribonianus in AD 42, Scribonianus was killed and Caecina was taken to Rome as a prisoner for conspiring with him. Arria begged the captain of the ship to allow her to join him on board. She claimed that if a consular Roman man was allowed slaves to take care of him, then she should save them the trouble and look after him herself. The captain refused, so Arria followed the great ship in a small fishing boat all the way to Rome.

Arria openly attacked the wife of the rebellion leader Scribonianus for giving evidence to the prosecution, crying:

"Am I to listen to you who could go on living after Scribonianus died in your arms?"

It was this sentence which alerted everyone to her intention of dying alongside Paetus.

Her son-in-law, Thrasea, attempted to persuade her to live, asking her if she would want her own daughter to kill herself if he were sentenced to death. Arria insisted that she would if her daughter, Arria the Younger, had lived as long and happily with Thrasea as she herself had with Caecina.

She was watched very closely from that point onwards, but, realising this, Arria said that they could not stop her from dying. Having pointed this out, she ran, head first, into a wall and knocked herself out cold. When she came to, she cried:

"I told you I would do it the hard way if you stopped me from doing it the easy way."

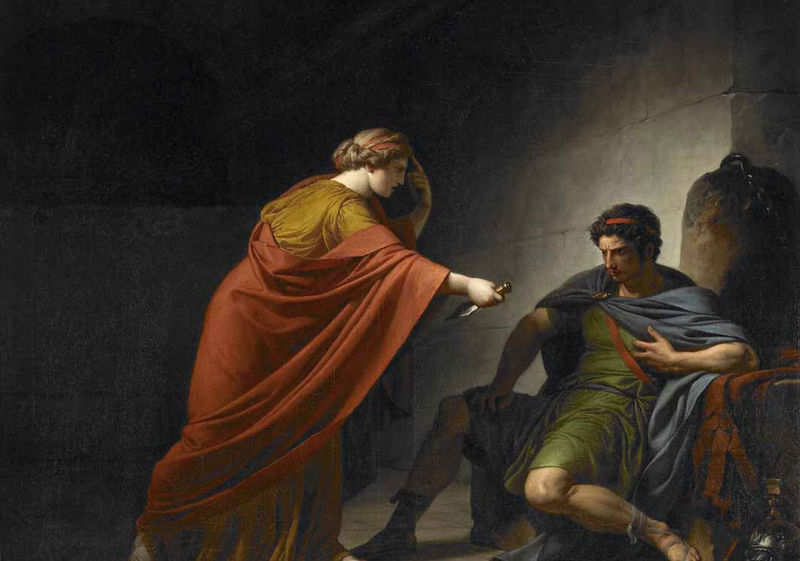
Arria and Paetus by François-André Vincent, 1784

Arria was eventually permitted to join her husband in a "noble death" (falling on one's own sword/dagger).

She is the subject of one of Marcus Valerius Martialis' epigrams.

ON ARRIA AND PAETUS. When Arria handed Paetus the sword she had used to stab herself, she said, "If you believe me, the wound which I have made gives me no pain; but it is that which you will make, Paetus, that pains me."

Sir Ronald Syme, an expert on prosopography, stated in his paper, 'People in Pliny', that he could not understand why Arria's granddaughter was called Fannia, stating: "Why she should be called 'Fannia', no clue."

== See also ==
- Arria gens
- Women in ancient Rome
- List of Roman women
