= Gaius Julius Silanus =

1st century Roman senator and general

Gaius Julius Silanus was a Roman senator and general who held a series of offices in the emperor's service. He was suffect consul for the nundinium of January to April 92 as the colleague of Quintus Junius Arulenus Rusticus. Silanus is known solely through inscriptions.

Ronald Syme speculates Silanus came from Tres Galliae, and adds that "the cognomen need have nothing to do with the aristocratic Junii Silani." He was co-opted into the Arval Brethren on 22 January 86 to replace the recently deceased Gaius Vipstanus Apronianus. While he was appointed magister in the year 87, he was absent from the records of the sodales for the rest of that year, and again from 89 to 91; Syme speculates Silanus was absent due to imperial appointment either to command a legion or to govern one of the eight imperial praetorian provinces.

Political offices
Preceded by Lucius Stertinius Avitus, and Tiberius Julius Celsus Polemaeanus as suffect consuls	Suffect consul of the Roman Empire; 92 with Quintus Junius Arulenus Rusticus	Succeeded by Sextus Pompeius Collega, and Quintus Peducaeus Priscinus as ordinary consuls
