= Aulus Caecina Paetus =

1st century AD Roman senator and consul

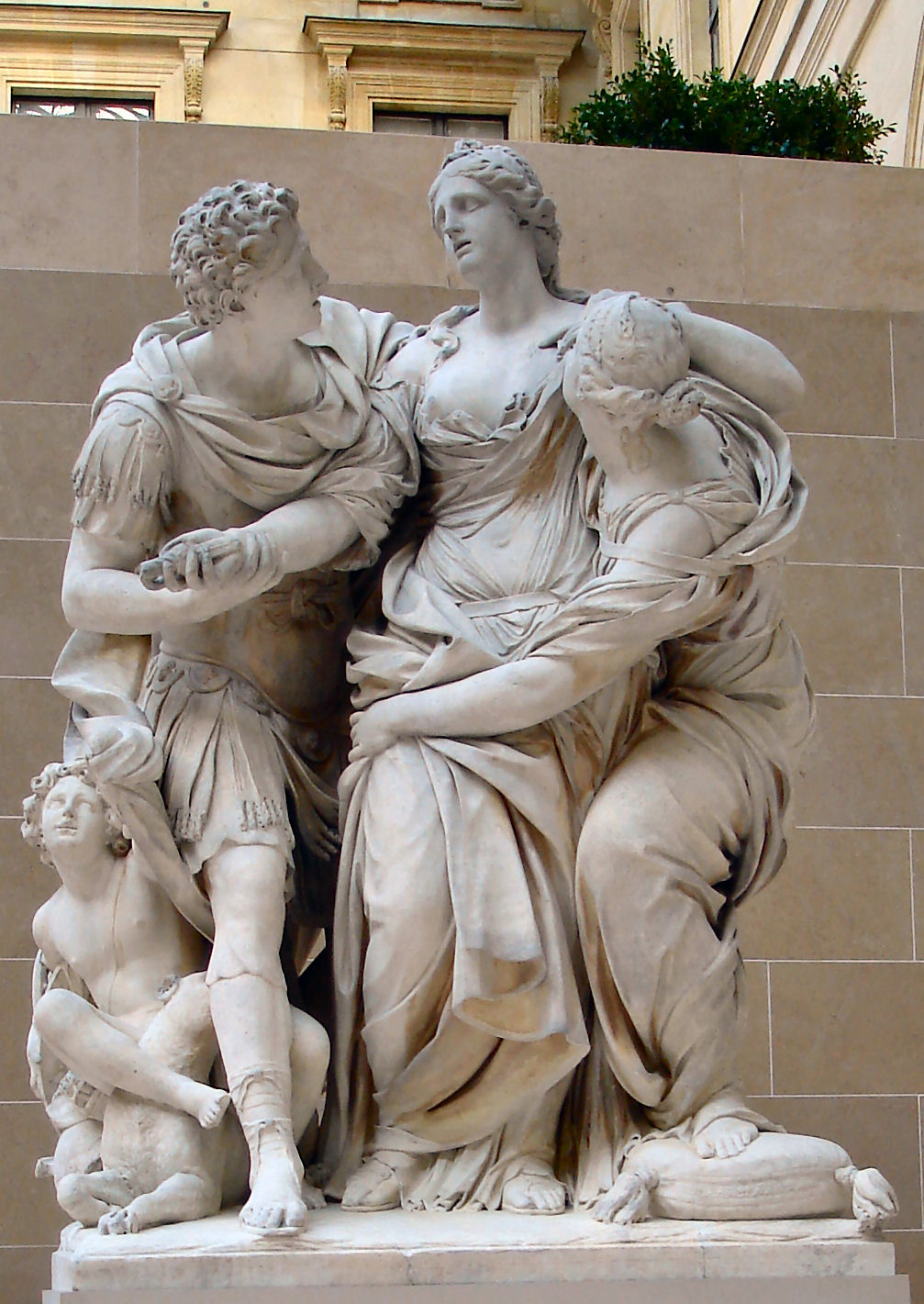
Arria et Paetus (Sculpture of Pierre Lepautre, 1681)

Aulus Caecina Paetus (died AD 42) was a Roman senator, who was condemned to death for his role in the revolt of Lucius Arruntius Camillus Scribonianus against the emperor Claudius. He was suffect consul in the nundinium of September to December 37 with Gaius Caninius Rebilus as his colleague.

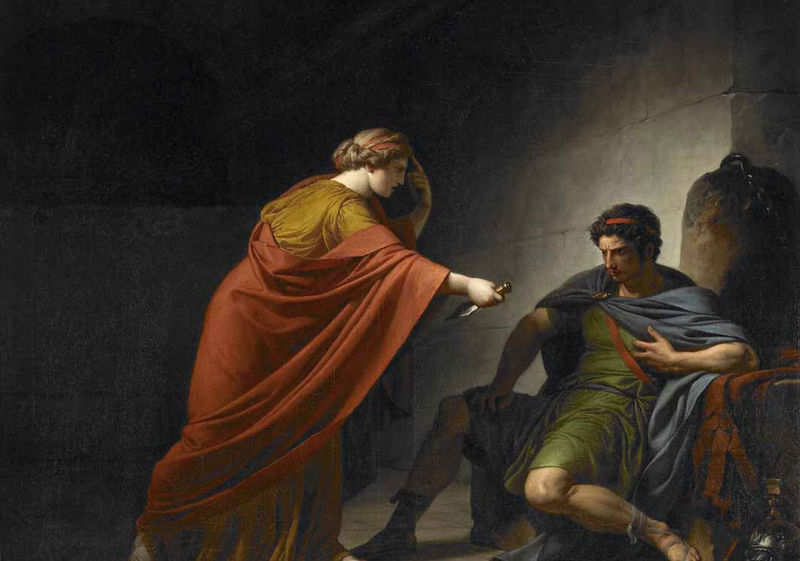
Arria and Paetus by François-André Vincent, 1784

When the sentence was handed down, it was determined that he would be allowed to kill himself rather than face the emperor's wrath. However, when the time came, Paetus wavered in his resolution to do so. His wife Arria stabbed herself first in order to give him the courage to do this and handed him the dagger saying "Non dolet, Paete!" ("It doesn't hurt, Paetus!")

Paetus and Arria had several children together. Those who survived to adulthood included:

- Gaius Laecanius Bassus Caecina Paetus, suffect consul in 70, and adopted by Gaius Laecanius Bassus;
- Caecina Arria, wife of Publius Clodius Thrasea Paetus.

Political offices
Preceded by Caligula; Claudius	Consul of the Roman Empire; September–December 37 with Gaius Caninius Rebilus	Succeeded by Marcus Aquila Julianus; P. Nonius Asprenas Calpurnius Serranus
