= Bronnikov =

Bronnikov (masculine, Russian: Бронников) or Bronnikova (feminine, Russian: Бронникова) is a Russian surname. Notable people with the surname include:

- Fyodor Bronnikov (1827–1902), Russian–born history and genre painter
