= Publius Anteius Rufus =

Ancient Roman politician

Publius Anteius Rufus (died 67 CE) was a politician of ancient Rome of the first century.

== Syria ==
Anteius was a notably wealthy man in Rome. He had in the past served as legate of Roman Syria, and governed Dalmatia in 51. He was a close friend of Agrippina the Younger, mother of the emperor Nero, and had in the past received gifts and promotions because of her patronage. As part of Nero's short-lived reconciliation with his mother at the end of 55, Anteius was promised the governorship of Syria, though by the time of Agrippina's murder on Nero's order in 59, this does not appear to have come to pass. Continuous excuses were made to keep Anteius in Rome, and leave the incumbent Gaius Ummidius Durmius Quadratus in charge of Syria. On Ummidius' death in 60, governorship was given to Gnaeus Domitius Corbulo instead of Anteius.

== Accusation and death ==
In 66, Anteius was detained in Rome by Nero after having been denounced, along with Marcus Ostorius Scapula, by Antistius Sosianus. Because an accusation — delatio — would mean the accuser might receive some portion of the property of the accused, this could be quite lucrative in imperial Rome. The grounds for this accusation were that Sosianus said he had discovered that Anteius had set up a yearly pension for the exiled Greek astrologer Pammenes — at this time, use of astrology could result in a charge of magic and treason against the emperor. As proof, Sosianus produced a letter from Pammenes to Anteius, as well as Pammenes' notes on the future careers of Anteius and Nero, ostensibly requested by Anteius.

The accused quickly became the condemned, without much in the way of a formal trial, if any. Fear of Nero, and of getting swept up in the accusation, was so great that none of Anteius' friends even stepped forward to witness his last will and testament. Finally, the praetorian prefect Tigellinus, did it, warning Anteius not to "procrastinate" with preparations for his death. Tigellinus was himself a noted profiteer from such accusations, and it's likely he himself profited by witnessing the will.

Anteius was already disliked by Nero on account of his intimacy with Nero's hated mother Agrippina, and was forced by Nero to kill himself in 67. Anteius first took poison, which did not work, after which he cut open his own veins.

The cognomen "Rufus" is not recorded in the account of Tacitus, but is ascribed to Anteius by the scholar Edmund Groag, based on inscriptions in his Prosopographia Imperii Romani.

== Relations ==
There was also an Anteius who fought with Germanicus on the front in Germania, and was banished and executed by the emperor Caligula, who was perhaps the father of Publius Anteius Rufus. Josephus mentions one, killed by the bodyguards of Caligula, who might have been the brother of Publius Anteius Rufus. As well there is recorded by Pliny an Anteia, who was the wife of Helvidius Priscus, and possibly the daughter of Publius Anteius Rufus.
