= Gaius Julius Proculus =

2nd century Roman senator, tribune, praetor and suffect consul

Gaius Julius Proculus was a Roman senator, who held a number of imperial appointments during the reign of Trajan. He was suffect consul in the nundinium of May to August 109 as the colleague of Gaius Aburnius Valens. He is known entirely from inscriptions. Anthony Birley notes there is a plausible possibility that Proculus also held a second suffect consulate; any man recorded as holding a second consulate after AD 103, held it as an ordinary consul, not as a suffect consul.

The origins of Proculus have been commonly surmised as in Gallia Narbonensis, based on his membership in the Roman tribe "Voltinia", that he was a Julius son of a man with the praenomen Marcus, and his cognomen Proculus. However, Birley notes Proculus could have had his origins instead in Larinum. Birley also offers two possible relatives for Proculus—Marcus Julius Ro[mu]lus, adlected into the Senate by Claudius, and his presumed son also named Marcus Julius Romulus, assistant to the governor of Sardinia in the term 68/69—whom Birley suggests were Proculus' grandfather and father respectively.

== Career ==
His cursus honorum is partially known from an inscription set up at Antium in Campania to commemorate his patronage of the city. Proculus began his career as one of the tresviri monetalis, the most prestigious of the four boards that comprise the vigintiviri; assignment to this board was usually allocated to patricians or favored individuals. This was followed by quaestor, as the candidate of the emperor, another indication of his favored status. Upon completion of this traditional Republican magistracy Proculus would be enrolled in the Senate. This was followed by a commission as a military tribune in the Legio IV Scythica, then stationed at Zeugma in Syria; upon returning to Rome, Proculus was appointed ab actis for the emperor Trajan. Then he advanced to the next two traditional Republican magistracies: plebeian tribune and praetor.

After completing his praetorship, Proculus was appointed to a series of offices. First he was commissioned legatus legionis or commander of Legio VI Ferrata, at the time stationed at Samosata; Birley dates his command around the years 104 to 106. Next was legatus pro praetor of the Transpadene region. Proculus then was appointed to supervise the census of the imperial province of Gallia Lugdunensis, and his final appointment prior to his consulate was curator operum publicorum. Also before his consulate Proculus was made a fetial and admitted to the Quindecimviri sacris faciundis, the Roman priesthood entrusted with the care of the Sibylline oracles.

His career after his consulate is disputed. A fragmentary inscription from Larinum, where most of the name of the subject is missing, nevertheless attests someone enjoyed a second consulate; the priesthoods, the governorship in Lugdunensis, and serving as a monetalis listed in this inscription, combined with the last portion of the subject's cognomen has convinced experts to identify the honorand as Gaius Julius Proculus. The problem is that he is not attested as an ordinary consul, let alone after the year 109; thus he must have been a suffect consul for a second time during the reign of Hadrian.

Political offices
Preceded by Gnaeus Antonius Fuscus, and Philopappos as suffect consuls	Suffect consul of the Roman Empire; 109 with Gaius Aburnius Valens,	Succeeded by Marcus Peducaeus Priscinus, and Servius Cornelius Scipio Salvidienus Orfitus as ordinary consuls
