= Persecution of philosophers =

Philosophers throughout the history of philosophy have been held in courts and tribunals for various offenses, often as a result of their philosophical activity, and some have even been put to death. The most famous example of a philosopher being put on trial is the case of Socrates, who was tried for, amongst other charges, corrupting the youth and impiety.

== Socrates ==
The trial of Socrates took place in 399 BC. Attended by the Ancient Greek philosophers Plato (who was a student of Socrates') and Xenophon, it resulted in the death of Socrates, who was sentenced to drink the poison hemlock. The trial is chronicled in the Platonic dialogues Euthyphro, Apology, Crito, and Phaedo.

== Roman Stoics ==
The Roman emperors Nero, Vespasian, and Domitian each faced opposition from Stoic statesmen, culminating in executions of opponents and banishment of other philosophers from Rome, including Musonius Rufus and Epictetus.

== Hypatia ==
Hypatia (c. 350–370 - 415) was a Hellenistic Neoplatonist philosopher, astronomer, and mathematician, who lived in Alexandria, Egypt, then part of the Eastern Roman Empire. She was murdered by a mob of Christians, likely for political reasons.

== Giordano Bruno ==
Giordano Bruno was an Italian Dominican friar, philosopher, mathematician, poet, cosmological theorist, and Hermetic occultist, known for his cosmological theories, which conceptually extended the then-novel Copernican model, proposing that the stars were distant suns surrounded by their own planets, raising the possibility that these planets might foster life of their own (a cosmological position known as cosmic pluralism), and insisting that the universe is infinite and could have no "center".

Starting in 1593, Bruno was tried for heresy by the Roman Inquisition on charges of denial of several core Catholic doctrines, including eternal damnation, the Trinity, the divinity of Christ, the virginity of Mary, and transubstantiation. Bruno's pantheism was not taken lightly by the church, nor was his teaching of the transmigration of the soul and reincarnation. The Inquisition found him guilty, and he was burned at the stake in Rome's Campo de' Fiori in 1600. After his death, he gained considerable fame, being particularly celebrated by 19th- and early 20th-century commentators who regarded him as a martyr for science, although most historians agree that his heresy trial was not a response to his cosmological views but rather a response to his religious views. However some recent research suggests that main reason for Bruno's death indeed was his cosmological views. Bruno's case is still considered a landmark in the history of free thought and the emerging sciences.

== Tommaso Campanella ==
Tommaso Campanella was confined to a convent for his heretical views, namely, an opposition to the authority of Aristotle. Later, he then spent twenty-seven years imprisoned in a castle during which he wrote his most famous works, including The City of the Sun.

== Baruch Spinoza ==
Baruch Spinoza, was a Jewish philosopher who, at age 23, was put in cherem (similar to excommunication) by Jewish religious authorities for heresies such as his controversial ideas regarding the authenticity of the Hebrew Bible (which would form the foundations of modern biblical criticism) and his pantheistic views of the Divine. Prior to that, he had been attacked on the steps of the community synagogue by a knife-wielding assailant shouting "Heretic!", and later his books were added to the Catholic Church's Index of Forbidden Books. In June 1678 - just over a year after Spinoza's death - the States of Holland banned his entire works, since they “contain very many profane, blasphemous and atheistic propositions.” The prohibition included the owning, reading, distribution, copying, and restating of Spinoza's books, and even the reworking of his fundamental ideas.
