= Uttiedia gens =

Ancient Roman family

The gens Uttiedia, occasionally written Uttedia or Utiedia, was an obscure plebeian family at ancient Rome. No members of this gens are mentioned by Roman writers, but several are known from epigraphy. Uttedius Honoratus was governor of Mauretania Tingitana in AD 144, and an Uttiedius Afer was consul designate in an uncertain year.

== Origin ==
The nomen Uttiedius belongs to a large class of gentilicia originally formed from cognomina ending in -idus. This type of nomen was so common that -idius and -edius came to be regarded as regular gentile-forming suffixes, and were applied to form gentilicia even from names that did not originally end in -idus.

== Praenomina ==
The praenomina found in the extant inscriptions of the Uttiedii include Sextus, Gaius, and Lucius, all of which were common throughout Roman history, as well as an example of the feminine praenomen Tertia.

== Members ==
This list includes abbreviated praenomina. For an explanation of this practice, see filiation.

- Uttiedia Cleopatra, dedicated a tomb at Abdera in Thracia, dating between the late first century BC and the middle of the second century, for her infant son, Aristocritus, aged five months and five days.
- Utiedius Allatus, mentioned in a graffito from Pompeii in Campania.
- Uttiedia Advena, built a first-century tomb at Urvinum Mataurense in Umbria for her daughter, Uttiedia Syntrophis.
- Uttiedia Syntrophis, buried in a first-century tomb built by her mother, Uttiedia Advena, at Urvinum Mataurense.
- Titus Uttiedius Venerianus, an actor buried in a first-century tomb at Philippi in Macedonia, aged seventy-five, along with his wife, Alfena Saturnina, aged fifty-one.
- Sextus Uttiedius C. f. Celer, a veteran of the Legio XV Apollinaris, buried at Savaria in Pannonia Superior, aged seventy, in a sepulchre built for Celer, the freedwomen Uttiedia Fusca and Valentia Repentina, and possibly several others, dating from the late first century.
- Sextus Utiedius Sex. l. Narcissus, a freedman, built a sepulchre at Savaria for his daughter, Utiedia Carnuntina, dating between the middle of the first century, and the early part of the second.
- Utiedia Sex. l. Carnuntina, a freedwoman buried at Savaria, aged twenty-five, in a tomb built by her father, Sextus Utiedius Narcissus.
- Gaius Uttiedius C. l. Quartio, a freedman, and one of the Seviri Augustales named in an inscription from Forum Sempronii in Umbria, dating from the first half of the second century.
- Uttedius Honoratus was governor of Mauretania Tingitana in AD 144.
- Uttedius Marcellus, a legate serving under Servius Cornelius Scipio Salvidienus Orfitus, governor of Africa from AD 163 to 164.

=== Undated Uttiedii ===
- Tertia Uttiedia C. f., buried at Urvinum Matuarense.
- Uttiedius L. f. Afer, an augur and consul designatus in an uncertain year, was patron of the Roman colony at Carthage.
- Lucius Uttiedius L. l. Beryllus, a freedman named in a sepulchral inscription from Rome.
- Uttiedia Chryse, buried at Rome along with her husband, Lucius Uttiedius Venustus.
- Sextus Uttiedius Philargurus, buried at Tuder in Umbria, along with the freedman Lucius Marius Demeter.
- Uttiedius Secundus, along with his mother-in-law, Caesia Arescusa, dedicated a tomb at Rome for his wife, Caesia Calliope, aged thirty-six years, fourteen days.
- Lucius Uttiedius Venustus, buried at Rome along with his wife, Uttiedia Chryse.

== See also ==
- List of Roman gentes

== Bibliography ==
- Theodor Mommsen et alii, Corpus Inscriptionum Latinarum (The Body of Latin Inscriptions, abbreviated CIL), Berlin-Brandenburgische Akademie der Wissenschaften (1853–present).
- René Cagnat et alii, L'Année épigraphique (The Year in Epigraphy, abbreviated AE), Presses Universitaires de France (1888–present).
- Paul von Rohden, Elimar Klebs, & Hermann Dessau, Prosopographia Imperii Romani (The Prosopography of the Roman Empire, abbreviated PIR), Berlin (1898).
