= Juvenalia =

In classical antiquity, the Juvenalia, or Ludi Juvenales (Gr Ἱουβενάλια ὥσπερ τινὰ νεανισκεύματα), were scenic games instituted by Nero in 59 AD, at the age of 21, in commemoration of his shaving his beard for the first time, thus indicating that he had passed from youth into manhood. These games were not celebrated in the circus, but in a private theatre erected in a pleasure-ground (nemus), and consisted of every kind of theatrical performance, Greek and Roman plays, mimetic pieces, and the like.

== Form and purpose ==
Juvenalia, otherwise known as Ludi Juvenales, is a branch of the Roman Ludi, otherwise known as festivals. Ludi were a display of theatrical greatness, as well as exhibitions, games and contests. While usually held in honor of the Gods, Ludi were also held in celebration of individuals of high status, as well as festivals for the deceased. In the case of the Ludi Juvenales, implementation was carried out in the high official status. This festival was to be held for the coming of age, or passage into adulthood, of Imperator Nero Claudius Divi Claudii filius Caesar Augustus Germanicus, known simply as Nero. Juvenalia is not to be confused with Neronia, also known as Quinquennalia, which was a series of musical, equestrian, and gymnastic events meant to imitate Greek festivals, also instituted by Nero.

The most distinguished persons in the state, old and young, male and female, were expected to take part in them. The emperor set the example by appearing in person on the stage; and Cassius Dio mentions a distinguished Roman matron, upwards of eighty years of age, who danced in the games. It was one of the offences given by Thrasea Paetus that he had not acquitted himself with credit at this festival (Cassius Dio, Roman History LXI.19; Tacitus, Annales, XIV.15, XV.33, XVI.21). Suetonius (Ner. 12) confounds this festival with the Quinquennalia, which was instituted in the following year, 60 AD.

The Juvenalia continued to be celebrated by subsequent emperors, but not on the same occasion. The name was given to those games which were exhibited by the emperors on 1 January in each year. They no longer consisted of scenic representations, but of chariot races and combats of wild beasts (Cassius Dio, Roman History, LXVII.14; Sidonius Apollinaris, Carm. XXIII.307, 428; Augustan History, "The Three Gordians", 4; cf. Lipsius, ad Tac. Ann. xiv.15).

== Nero ==
The aspect signifying coming of adulthood was the shaving of the beard of Nero, in the year 59 AD at the age of 22. Unlike many of the other Ludi, Juvenalia was not held in a circus-like manor, but instead displayed upon a “pleasure mound” otherwise known as a Nemus. After their initial institution on the private grounds of Nero, they were eventually instituted in public places for the same celebration of adulthood, held on the first of January of every year. These public events were to be held by all individuals of upper classes, with appearances by Nero himself to commemorate the events. After passing occurrences, Juvenalia were no longer composed of scenic events, but instead of chariot races and wild beast fighting. This was mostly due to the aspirations of Nero as he, in his growth, admired and aspired to be a great chariot event participant, as is evident in his later involvement with such endeavors. This also evident in that the Neronia, instituted a year later by Nero, did include events such as these, indicating that following his coming of age, Nero plunged into the sports he so clearly desired. Due to this shift in events, it is clear to see where the distinction between Juvenalia and Neronia (Ludi Juvena’les and Quinquennalia) has become skewed.

However, under accounts by Tacitus, it is apparent that at these particular Ludi conduct of attendants was not exactly friendly. People's actions were considered to be indecent, and without acting this way, Nero was not amused. To get on Nero's bad side, one simply had to not act as festive and wild as the rest of the participants, as seen with Thrasea Paetus.

Additional to the controversy stirred up by Nero's Juvenalia during his reign, the concept of Juvenalia has stirred up a considerable amount of argument in modern age religion, with the debate between Pagans and Christians over each other's histories. Due to Christian persecution under Nero in 64 A.D. general public view on Christians at such a time was not one of positive outlook. After Nero accused Christians of setting fire to Rome, the public, looking for someone on which to aim their blame, were deflected from Nero onto Christians, a sort of persecution that has stayed paramount between Christianity and Paganism since this era. Accusations, then, began to surface about the Christian holiday of Christmas, being a result of inspiration by Nero's Juvenalia. However, due to the Juvenalia being a festival that was not limited to, but more centered around upper classes, and slightly less known to the general population, accusers fail to see that these are two unrelated subjects, especially at a fundamental level. Christmas is focused upon the birth of a deity, whereas Juvenalia is focused upon the “coming of age” of the (upper class) Roman male.
