= Arria and Paetus =

Painting by François-André Vincent

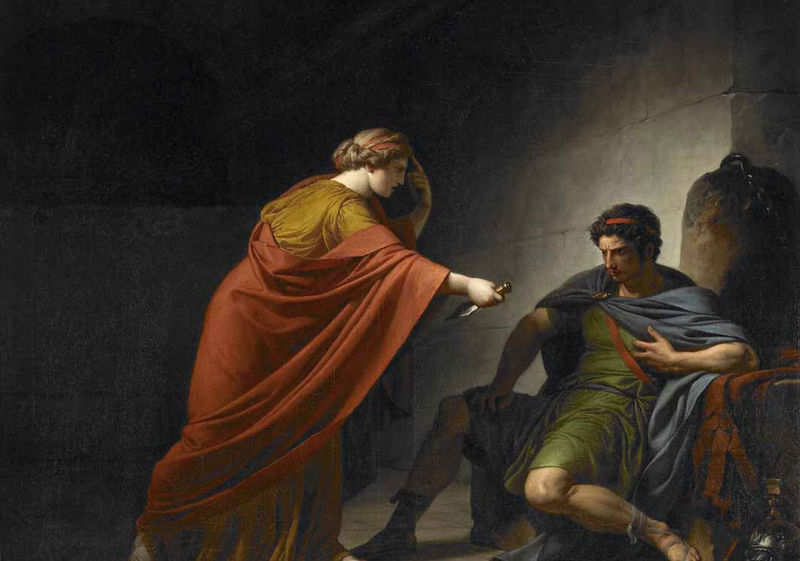
- Artist: François-André Vincent
- Year: 1784
- Type: Oil on canvas, history painting
- Dimensions: 325 cm × 423 cm (128 in × 167 in)
- Location: Saint Louis Art Museum, Missouri

Arria and Paetus (French: Arria et Pætus) is an oil on canvas history painting by the French artist François-André Vincent, from 1784. It is a depiction of a legendary scene from Ancient Rome.

== History and description ==
When her husband senator Aulus Caecina Paetus is ordered to commit suicide by the Emperor Claudius but hesitates to do the act, his wife Arria seizes the dagger and plunges it into herself as a gesture of encouragement. She the hands it to him, saying "See, Paetus, it does not hurt". The story is based on the letters of Pliny the Younger and features an example of stoicism. Vincent seems to have drawn on the depiction of the incident by the playwright Marie-Anne Barbier.

Vincent was a leading Neoclassical painter and a rival of Jacques-Louis David, like him also a former pupil of Joseph-Marie Vien. The original painting is at the Saint Louis Art Museum. Vincent produced a second, larger sequel painting ,featuring the aftermath, in 1785, which is today in the collection of the Musée de Picardie, in Amiens. He exhibited both paintings together at the Salon of 1785 at the Louvre in Paris.

== Bibliography ==
- Freund, Amy. Portraiture and Politics in Revolutionary France. Penn State University Press, 2014.
- Mansfield, Elizabeth C. The Perfect Foil: François-André Vincent and the Revolution in French Painting. University of Minnesota Press, 2011
