= Marcus Peducaeus Stloga Priscinus =

2nd century Roman senator and consul

Marcus Peducaeus Stloga Priscinus was a Roman senator active during the middle of the second century AD. He was ordinary consul for 141 as the colleague of Titus Hoenius Severus.

Priscinus came of a Republican family, the Peducaei. His father was Marcus Peducaeus Priscinus, ordinary consul in 110. It has often been suggested that Priscinus adopted Marcus Peducaeus Plautius Quintillus, ordinary consul in 177; Quintillus was the birth son of Plautius Quintillus, consul in 159. The details of Priscinus' senatorial career have not yet been recovered. He is known only through surviving inscriptions.

An inscription from the Great Theatre at Ephesus mentions a Marcus Peducaeus Priscinus as proconsular governor of Asia, whom professor Géza Alföldy, amongst others, has identified as this Priscinus. However, Ronald Syme denied the identification, attributing the inscription to his father instead.

Political offices
Preceded by Marcus Barbius Aemilianus, and Titus Flavius Julianus as suffect consuls	Consul of the Roman Empire; 141 with Titus Hoenius Severus	Succeeded by Gaius Julius Pisibanus, and (Larcius?) Lepidus as suffect consuls
