= Publius Clodius Thrasea Paetus =

1st century AD Roman senator

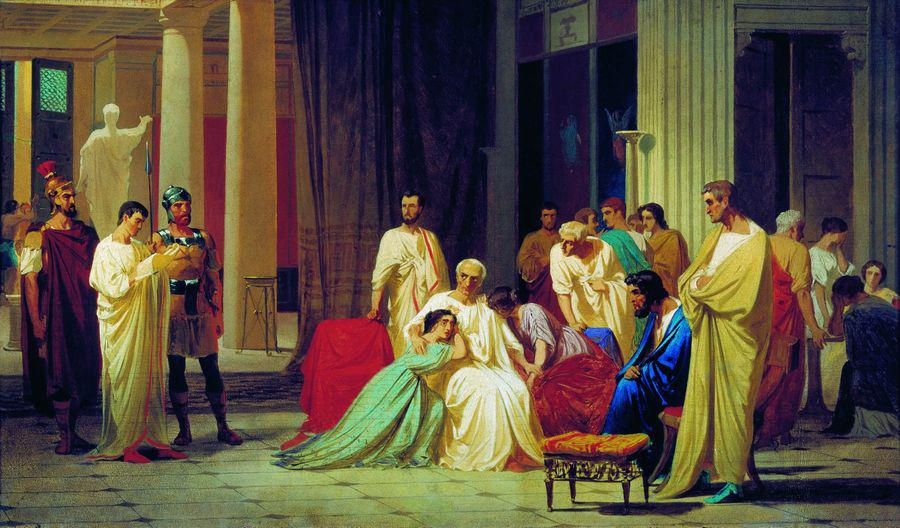
- Quaestor Reading the Death Sentence to Senator Thrasea Paetus, by Fyodor Bronnikov (19th c.)
- Born: Publius Clodius Thrasea; Patavium
- Died: AD 66
- Cause of death: Forced suicide
- Occupation: Senator
- Years active: AD 42–66
- Known for: Stoicism; Opposition to Nero
- Office: Suffect consul (Nov–Dec 56); Quindecimvir sacris faciundis (c. 56–66)
- Spouse: Arria
- Children: Fannia (daughter)

Publius Clodius Thrasea Paetus (fl. AD 42–66; died 66) was a Roman senator who lived in the 1st century AD. Notable for his principled opposition to the emperor Nero and his interest in Stoicism, he was the husband of Arria, who was the daughter of Aulus Caecina Paetus and the elder Arria, father-in-law of Helvidius Priscus, and a friend and relative by marriage of the poet Persius. Thrasea was the most prominent member of the political faction known today as the Stoic Opposition.

== Early life ==
Thrasea was born in Patavium to a distinguished and wealthy family. He maintained close links with the town, in later life taking an important part in the city's triennial festival. Nothing is known for certain of his early career, nor through whose influence he succeeded in entering the senate. By AD 42, however, he was married to Caecinia Arria, daughter of Caecina Paetus (suffect consul in 37). Caecina was implicated in the revolt of Lucius Scribonianus against the emperor Claudius, probably with the aim of restoring the republic. Thrasea's daughter Fannia, whose account is preserved in a letter of Pliny, recounts that Thrasea attempted unsuccessfully to prevent his mother-in-law Arria from killing herself along with her husband. It was probably after the death of Caecina Paetus that Thrasea added the name Paetus to his own, a very unusual step for a son-in-law and one which advertised his connection with an enemy of the emperor.

We have no information on the chronology of Thrasea's progression through the lower ranks of the cursus honorum. It is possible, but by no means certain, that his political career was at a standstill at least in the early years of Claudius' reign. He was suffect consul November to December 56, alongside Lucius Duvius Avitus, the post likely having been secured by the influence of Nero's adviser Seneca, who had preceded him in office in the same year. At some date probably not long after this, he was still in enough favour to be given an honorific priesthood as quindecimvir sacris faciundis. During his suffect consulship he had also acquired an important political ally in his son-in-law Helvidius Priscus, who served in the plebeian tribunate the same year.

There are some indications that Thrasea's rise to prominence may have been helped by activity in the law courts. At some point between 52 and 62 (whether before or after his consulship is not clear) he probably held some provincial governorship; this is the implication of the statement in the Life of Persius that the young poet 'travelled abroad' with his inlaw. Senators did not normally travel outside Italy simply for fun.

== Political activity ==
In 57, the year after his consulship, Thrasea supported the cause of the Cilicians accusing their late governor, Cossutianus Capito, of extortion, and the prosecution succeeded apparently largely through his influence. But Tacitus' first reference to him in the Annals relates to the following year, when he surprised both friends and enemies by speaking against a routine motion in the senate, a request by the Syracusans to exceed the statutory number of gladiators at their games. The objections to this which Tacitus attributes to (anonymous) "detractors" show, if accurate, that Thrasea already had a reputation for opposition to the status quo and for dedication to the ideal of senatorial freedom. To his friends, Thrasea explained that he was not unaware of the real state of affairs, but gave the senate the credit of understanding that those who paid attention to trivial matters would not pass over more important ones—leaving unspoken some such phrase as "if they were permitted real debate on such issues".

In spring of the following year, he first openly showed his disgust at the behaviour of Nero and the obsequiousness of the senate after the emperor's letter justifying the murder of Agrippina had been read and various motions congratulating Nero proposed. Senatorial procedure required each individual in turn to give his opinion on the motion, and Thrasea chose to walk out of the meeting since, according to Dio, "he could not say what he would and would not say what he could". His withdrawal from the Neronian political scene continued with his policy of absenteeism continuing later that year as he refused at the Juvenalia to applaud Nero's singing.

In 62, the praetor Antistius Sosianus, who had written abusive poems about Nero, was accused on a maiestas charge by Thrasea's old enemy Cossutianus Capito, who had recently been restored to the senate through the influence of his father-in-law Tigellinus. Thrasea dissented from the proposal to impose the death sentence and argued that the proper legal penalty for such an offence was exile. His view won majority assent, and was eventually passed, despite a clearly unfavourable response from Nero, whom the consuls had consulted when the vote was taken. Tacitus' narrative in this section shows Thrasea attempting to claw back to the senate one of the cornerstone virtues of imperial propaganda and ideology, the clementia of the emperor, while also setting a precedent against death sentences for such offences. Parallels have also been seen with Caesar's speech in the Sallust's Catilinarian monograph and Tacitus' narrative of Marcus Lepidus' defence of a poet during the reign of Tiberius.

In the same year, at the trial of the Cretan Claudius Timarchus in the senate, the defendant was alleged to have said several times that it was in his power whether the proconsul of Crete received the thanks of the province or not. Thrasea proposed that such abuses should be prevented by the prohibition of such votes of thanks. Once again he carried the majority, but a senatus consultum was not passed until the consuls had ascertained the views of the emperor.

The following year made plain Nero's displeasure with Thrasea. When a daughter was born to the emperor at Antium, the senate went in a body to offer congratulations, but Thrasea was expressly excluded by Nero. Such 'renunciations of friendship' on the part of the emperor were normally the prelude to the victim's death, but unexpectedly Nero seems to have changed his mind at this point, perhaps due to fluctuating power dynamics with Tigellinus, who as Capito's father-in-law might be presumed to have a strong motive to wish for Thrasea's elimination. It was said that when Nero told Seneca he had been reconciled with Thrasea, Seneca congratulated him on recovering a valuable friendship, rather than praising him for his clemency.

From about this time, however, Thrasea withdrew from political life. We do not know exactly when he took this decision (Tacitus makes Capito say in 66 that 'for three years he has not entered the senate-house' but Capito's list of complaints against him is clearly contentious and possibly unreliable), nor what was the catalyst for such a volte-face, but it was clear that it was intended, and understood, as itself a political action, especially coming from one who had previously applied himself so assiduously to senatorial business; it was the ultimate form of protest. During this time, Thrasea continued to look after the interests of his clients. It was probably also in this period that he wrote his Life of Cato, in which he praised the advocate of senatorial freedom against Caesar, with whom he also shared an interest in Stoicism. This work, now lost, was a major source for Plutarch's life of the younger Cato.

== Trial and death ==
In 66, Cossutianus Capito finally succeeded in convincing Nero to move against Thrasea. Nero may have hoped to 'bury' his attack on Thrasea and simultaneously on Barea Soranus by acting during the visit of the Armenian king Tiridates to Rome; at all events, he began by excluding Thrasea from the reception of Tiridates. Perhaps, as Tacitus suggests, he wished to panic him into some sort of submission, but Thrasea's reaction was merely to inquire what the charges against him were and to ask for time to prepare a defence—the implication being probably that there was no legal basis for proceedings against him. This was likely true, to judge by the bizarre nature of some of the supporting evidence alleged by Capito (such as not sacrificing to the Heavenly Voice of the emperor), but the trial nonetheless took place in the senate. Thrasea, having consulted with his friends, decided not to attend; he also declined the offer of the young Arulenus Rusticus, one of the tribunes, to use his tribunician veto against the decree of the senate, saying that such an action would merely endanger the life of the tribune without saving his own.

On the day of the trial, the meeting-place of the senate was surrounded by armed cohorts of the Praetorian Guard. A letter from Nero was read, mentioning no names but blaming senior senators for neglecting their public duties; then Capito spoke against Thrasea, and was followed by Eprius Marcellus, whom Tacitus regards as the more effective speaker. No speeches for the defence are mentioned; the senators had little alternative but to vote for the death penalty, in the form of the 'free choice of death' (liberum mortis arbitrium), that is, an order to commit suicide. In a separate action, Barea Soranus and his daughter Servilia were also condemned to death; with Thrasea were condemned, but to lesser penalties, his son-in-law Helvidius Priscus and associates Paconius Agrippinus and Curtius Montanus.

When the news was brought to Thrasea at his suburban villa, where he was entertaining a number of friends and sympathisers, he retired to a bedroom, and had the veins of both his arms opened. Calling to witness the quaestor who had brought the death sentence, he identified the shedding of his blood as a libation to Iuppiter Liberator—Jupiter who gives freedom. The surviving text of Tacitus breaks off at the moment when Thrasea was about to address Demetrius, the Cynic philosopher, with whom he had previously that day held a conversation on the nature of the soul. His death, though painful and protracted, contained allusions to the deaths of Socrates and Cato, and was evidently presented by his biographer Arulenus Rusticus, and probably constructed by himself, as a model of a dignified, calm and humane end.

== In popular culture ==
- Thrasea is mentioned in Quo Vadis, the 1895 novel by Nobel laureate Henryk Sienkiewicz.
- In the second chapter of Marguerite Yourcenar's 1951 novel, Memoirs of Hadrian, the emperor alludes to Thrasea's composure in the face of death when he muses, “If ever I am to undergo torture (and illness will doubtless see to that) I cannot be sure of maintaining the impassiveness of a Thrasea, but I shall at least have the resource of resigning myself to my cries.”

== Bibliography ==
=== Modern sources ===
- Brunt, Peter (1975). "Stoicism and the principate". Papers of the British School at Rome. 43: 7–35. doi:10.1017/S0068246200008217. ISSN 2045-239X.
- Chisholm, Hugh, ed. (1911). "Thrasea Paetus, Publius Clodius" . Encyclopædia Britannica. Vol. 26 (11th ed.). Cambridge University Press.
- Devillers, O (1993). "Le rôle des passages relatifs à Germanicus dans les Annales de Tacite". Ancient Society (in French). 24 (0): 225–241. doi:10.2143/AS.24.0.2005867. ISSN 0066-1619.
- Germerodt, Fabian (2020-05-10). "Networking in the early Roman empire: Pliny the Younger" (PDF). Journal of Historical Network Research: 252–270. doi:10.25517/JHNR.V4I0.79.
- Holiday, Ryan; Hanselman, Stephen (2020). "Thrasea the Fearless". Lives of the Stoics. New York: Portfolio/Penguin. pp. 218–227. ISBN 978-0-525-54187-5.
- Künnert, Heinrich (1900). "Clodius 58" . Realencyclopädie der classischen Altertumswissenschaft (in German). Vol. IV, 1. Stuttgart: Butcher. cols. 99–103 – via Wikisource.
- Osgood, Josiah (2017). "Nero and the senate". In Littlewood, Cedric; et al. (eds.). The Cambridge companion to the age of Nero. Cambridge University Press. pp. 34–47. doi:10.1017/9781107280489.004. ISBN 978-1-107-05220-8.
- "P Clodius Thrasea Paetus". Prosopographia Imperii Romani. Vol. 1 (1st ed.). Berlin: Georg Reimer. 1897. p. 423.
- Rudič, Vasilij A, ed. (1993). Political dissidence under Nero: the price of dissimulation. London New York: Routledge. ISBN 978-0-203-97599-2.
- Strunk, Thomas E (2010). "Saving the life of a foolish poet: Tacitus on Marcus Lepidus, Thrasea Paetus, and political action under the principate". Syllecta Classica. 21 (1): 119–139. doi:10.1353/syl.2011.0001. ISSN 2160-5157.
- Syme, Ronald (1979). "A political group". Roman papers. Vol. 7. Oxford: Clarendon Press. pp. 568–87. ISBN 978-0-19-814490-8.
- Turpin, William (2008-10-01). "Tacitus, Stoic exempla , and the praecipuum munus annalium". Classical Antiquity. 27 (2): 359–404. doi:10.1525/ca.2008.27.2.359. ISSN 0278-6656.
- Wirszubski, Ch (1950). Libertas as a political idea at Rome during the late republic and early principate. Cambridge Classical Studies. Cambridge University Press.

=== Ancient sources ===
- Cassius Dio (1914–27) [c. AD 230]. Historia Romana [Roman history]. Loeb Classical Library. Translated by Cary, Earnest – via LacusCurtius. (Nine volumes.)
- Juvenal, Satire 5. 36 with scholia.
- Pliny. Epistulae.
- Tacitus. Annales.

Political offices
Preceded by Publius Sulpicius Scribonius Rufus, and Publius Sulpicius Scribonius Proculus as Suffect consuls	Suffect consul of the Roman Empire; 56 with Lucius Duvius Avitus	Succeeded by Nero II, and Lucius Calpurnius Piso as Ordinary consuls
