= Sextus Pompeius Collega =

1st century Roman senator and consul

Sextus Pompeius Collega was a Roman senator and orator active during the last half of the first century AD. He was ordinary consul for 93 with Quintus Peducaeus Priscinus as his colleague. He was the son of Gnaeus Pompeius Collega, suffect consul in 71.

Collega is best known from Pliny the Younger's account in his Epistulae about the corruption trial of Marius Priscus, the former proconsular governor of Africa. When the trial had moved to the penalty stage, Gaius Julius Cornutus Tertullus proposed that Priscus be punished with a fine of 700,000 sesterces and exile from Rome and Italy; Collega not only expressed his agreement with this penalty, but proposed that the fine be paid into the treasury. When his version of the proposal failed to gain support, Collega complained about the faithlessness of the senators who encouraged him to make his proposal, who included Marcus Aquilius Regulus.

Political offices
Preceded by Gaius Julius Silanus, and Quintus Junius Arulenus Rusticus as suffect consuls	Consul of the Roman Empire; 93 with Quintus Peducaeus Priscinus	Succeeded by Titus Avidius Quietus, and Sextus Lusianus Proculus as suffect consuls
