= Marcus Peducaeus Priscinus =

2nd century Roman senator and consul

Marcus Peducaeus Priscinus was a Roman senator of the second century. He was ordinary consul in the year 110 with Servius Cornelius Scipio Salvidienus Orfitus as his colleague. Priscinus is primarily known from inscriptions.

Priscinus came from a Roman Republic family, the gens Peducaei. He was the son of Quintus Peducaeus Priscinus, ordinary consul in 93; his son was Marcus Peducaeus Stloga Priscinus, consul in 141. The senatorial career of the consul of 110 is not known, except that the sortition awarded Priscinus the proconsular governorship of Asia for 124/125.

Political offices
| Preceded by Gaius Aburnius Valens, and Gaius Julius Proculus as suffect consuls | Consul of the Roman Empire; 110 with Servius Cornelius Scipio Salvidienus Orfitus | Succeeded by Gaius Avidius Nigrinus, and Tiberius Julius Aquila Polemaeanus as suffect consuls |
