= Cossutianus Capito =

1st century AD Roman senator and delator

Cossutianus Capito (fl. 1st century AD) was a Roman senator and delator, often acting on behalf of the contemporary Roman emperor during the Principate. Tacitus offers a hostile portrait of Capito in his Annales, describing him as a "man stained with much wickedness", and as having "a heart eager for the worst wickedness".

== Career ==
Tacitus first mentions Capito following the trial and suicide of Valerius Asiaticus in AD 47, when he and Publius Suillius Rufus were subsequently threatened with the Lex Cincia for accepting payments in return for serving as a legal advocate. However, both men managed to extract leniency from emperor Claudius, and he amended the law to permit a fee to be paid to an advocate of up to ten thousand sesterces.

After this incident he became the governor of Cilicia; the year of his tenure is not known. But he had returned to Rome by the year 57, for in that year the subjects of Cilicia, represented by the senator Thrasea Paetus, accused him of extortion. Capito lost this lawsuit; his penalties included being stripped of his senatorial rank.

Capito had regained his senatorial rank by the year 62, when he reappears in Tacitus' work, with the help of his father-in-law the praetorian prefect Ofonius Tigellinus. In that year he accused the praetor Antistius Sosianus of an act of treason, specifically writing and reciting scurrilous verses about the emperor Nero at a banquet hosted by Marcus Ostorius Scapula. Tacitus notes that this was the first occasion that anyone had been prosecuted for treason under Nero. Although Scapula claimed to have not heard the verses in question, a number of witnesses testified Sosianus had done so. Quintus Junius Marullus, the consul-elect, proposed that Sosianus should be deprived of his praetorship and executed; but once again Thrasea Paetus intervened against Capito, and convinced the Senate to pass a milder verdict of banishment to a desolate island.

These successes of Thrasea Paetus earned him the displeasure of both the emperor and Capito. Four years later, he assisted Titus Clodius Eprius Marcellus in the prosecution Thrasea Paetus; Nero coerced the Senate to find him guilty, which led to Thrasea Paetus' suicide.

His life afterwards is a blank. It is uncertain whether Capito survived the turmoil of the Year of Four Emperors.
