= Pierre Lepautre (sculptor) =

French sculptor (1659-1744)

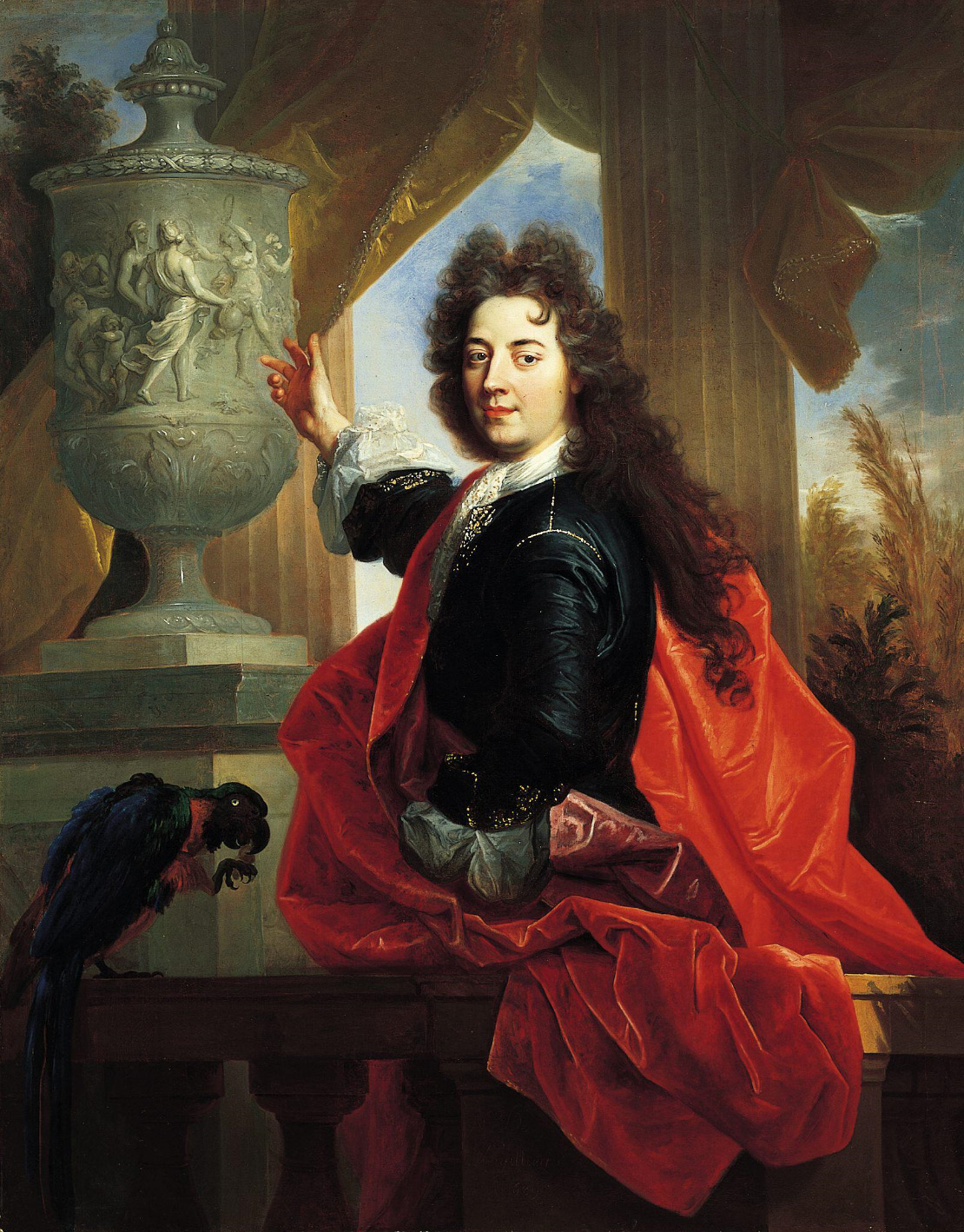
- A portrait of Pierre Lepautre, painted by Nicolas de Largillière in 1689.
- Born: March 4, 1659
- Died: January 22, 1744 (aged 84)

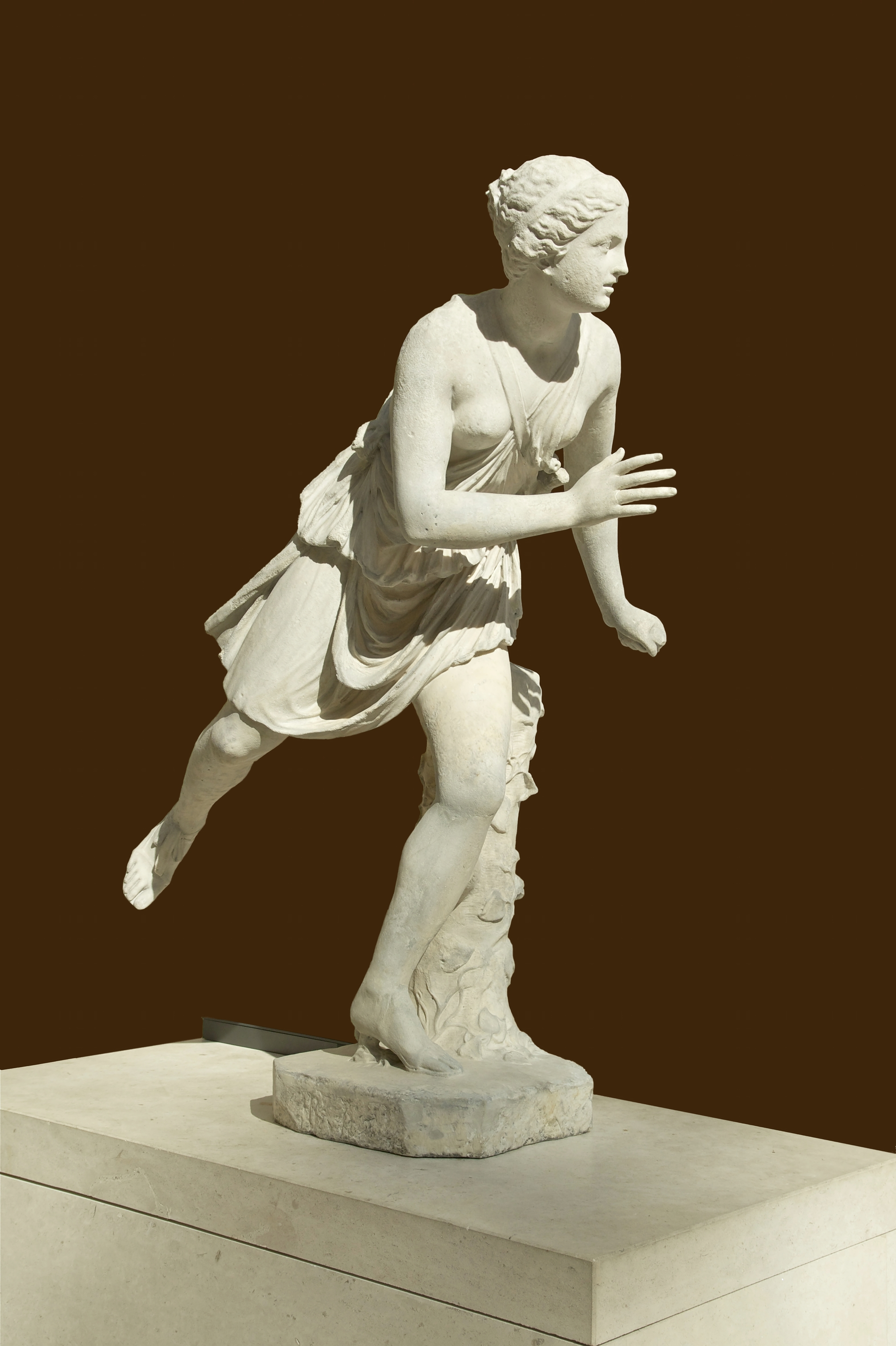
Atalante, for Louis XIV's Marly, 1704

Pierre Lepautre (4 March 1659 – 22 January 1744) was a French sculptor, a member of a prolific family of artists in many media, who were active in the 17th and 18th centuries. He was born and died in Paris.

He won the Prix de Rome, for study at the French Academy in Rome, where he was a pensionnaire' from 1683 to 1701. While in Rome he sent back to France a number of sculptures demonstrating his skill, among which were the Faune au chevreau of 1685, which went to ornament the gardens at Château de Marly. Lepautre returned to Paris in 1701. His Atalante (1704) was also destined for Marly. From 1705 to 1710, he was occupied with decorative bas-reliefs and sculptures for the royal chapel of Versailles, under the artistic supervision of Jules Hardouin-Mansart: his are the colossal statues of Saint Ambrose and Saint Gregory.

A retable in the form of a monumental gateway in the église de Saint-Eustache, Paris, illustrates the assumption of Saint Agnes.

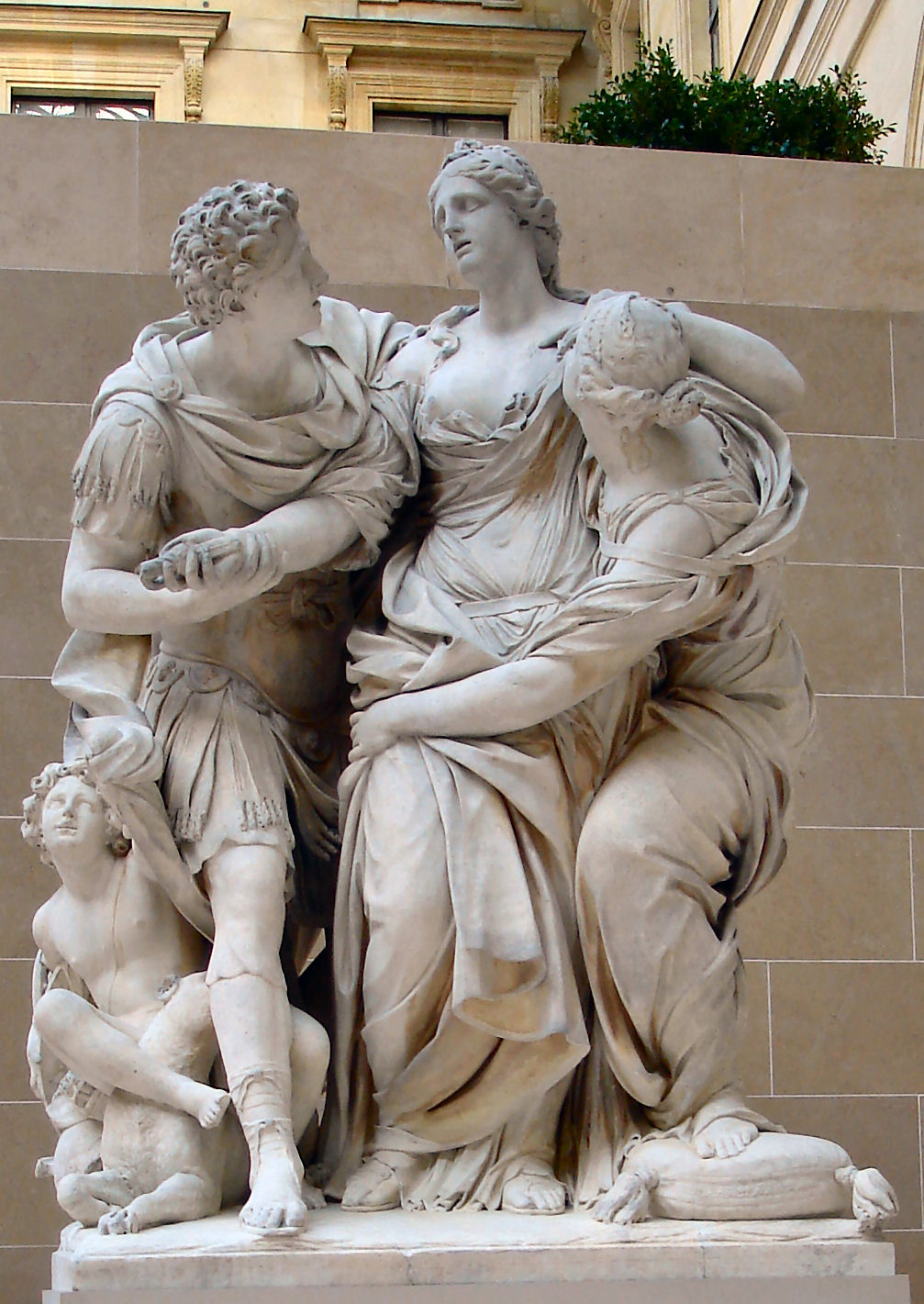
Arria et Paetus, 1695

His completion of the over-lifesize group of Arria et Pœtus (finished 1695) after the design begun by Jean-Baptiste Théodon proceeded too slowly and Énée portant son père Anchise suivi d'Ascagne (signed and dated 1716), after François Girardon demonstrated his facility and fidelity as an executant. The sculpture of Aeneas carrying Anchises was begun in Rome, where Lepautre made numerous terracotta bozzetti for it. The sculpture gained renown for Lepautre: bronze reductions of it were made for collectors. The 19th-century classicizing sculptor David d'Angers had one of Lepautre's designs for it, which was given by his widow to the museum in his native city.

Pierre Lepautre preferred to become a member of the modest artists' Académie de Saint-Luc, for which he held a lifetime post as Rector, rather than try for the more prestigious Académie royale de peinture et de sculpture.
