= Herennius Senecio =

1st century Roman Stoic, quaestor and writer

Herennius Senecio (d. 93 AD) was among the Stoic Opposition to the emperor Domitian, under whose rule he was executed. He was from Baetica in Hispania. He was the author of a laudatory biography of the Stoic martyr Helvidius Priscus.

In 93 AD, Herennius and Pliny successfully prosecuted a case against Baebius Massa for improprieties during his administration in Baetica. Baebius's property was confiscated in order to make reparations to the provincials. Baebius retaliated by bringing a charge of treason (maiestas) against Herennius, accusing him of impietas, but dropped the case when Pliny threatened a counter suit.

Mettius Carus, however, managed to convict Herennius. Although the details of the case are unclear, several factors rendered Herennius vulnerable. Because he had declined to run for any office after he was quaestor, he might be accused of desertion of public duty (secessio). He was connected by friendship and possibly blood to the emperor's enemies. In his biography of Helvidius, Herennius was praising an unrelenting critic of Domitian's father. Helvidius's widow Fannia, the daughter of Thrasea Paetus, had given Herennius her late husband's notebooks (commentarii); for this she was also prosecuted by Carus and condemned to exile. Another member of this circle who fell victim to Domitian was Arulenus Rusticus.
