= Arulenus Rusticus =

Roman Stoic philosopher and senator (c. 35–93)

Quintus Junius Arulenus Rusticus (c. 35 – 93 AD) was a Roman Senator and a friend and follower of Thrasea Paetus, and like him an ardent admirer of Stoic philosophy. Arulenus Rusticus attained a suffect consulship in the nundinium of September to December 92 with Gaius Julius Silanus as his colleague. He was one of a group of Stoics who opposed the perceived tyranny and autocratic tendencies of certain emperors, known today as the Stoic Opposition.

His contemporaries referred to him in varying ways. The Fasti of Potentia and Ostia call him Q. Arulenus Rusticus, while Tacitus, Pliny the Younger, and Dio Cassius call him Arulenus Rusticus or Rusticus Arulenus, yet Suetonius calls him Junius Rusticus. That his brother was a friend of Pliny the Younger named Junius Mauricus, the senator Junius Rusticus (attested as alive in AD 29) is commonly identified as his father, and Quintus Junius Rusticus (suffect consul in 133 and ordinary consul in 162) as his grandson, only increases the perplexity. In his monograph on Roman naming practices, Olli Salomies attempted to determine to which gens Arulenus Rusticus belonged—Aruleni or Junii—only to admit there is no better explanation than the suggestion of Ronald Syme that Arulenus "is either adoptive or maternal—and accorded preference to the indistinctive 'Iunius'".

== Life ==
Arulenus Rusticus was plebeian tribune in AD 66, in which year Thrasea was condemned to death by the Roman Senate; he would have placed his veto upon the senatus consultum, had not Thrasea prevented him, as he would only have brought certain destruction upon himself without saving the life of the defendant. He was praetor in the civil wars after the death of Nero (69 AD), when as one of the senate's ambassadors to the Flavian armies he was wounded by the soldiers of Petilius Cerialis. Although Arulenus Rusticus attained a suffect consulship during the reign of Domitian, in the following year he was condemned to death because he wrote a panegyric to Thrasea.

When I was once lecturing in Rome, that famous Rusticus, whom Domitian later killed through envy at his repute, was among my hearers, and a soldier came through the audience and delivered to him a letter from the emperor. There was a silence and I, too, made a pause, that he might read his letter; but he refused and did not break the seal until I had finished my lecture and the audience had dispersed. Because of this incident everyone admired the dignity of the man.

Suetonius attributes to him a panegyric on Helvidius Priscus, but the latter work was composed by Herennius Senecio, as we learn both from Tacitus and Pliny the Younger.

== See also ==
- Junia (gens)

Political offices
Preceded by Lucius Stertinius Avitus, and Tiberius Julius Celsus Polemaeanus as suffect consuls	Suffect consul of the Roman Empire; 92 with Gaius Julius Silanus	Succeeded by Sextus Pompeius Collega, and Quintus Peducaeus Priscinus as ordinary consuls
