= Antistius Sosianus =

Antistius Sosianus (c. AD 30 – after 70) was a Roman aristocrat who served as plebeian tribune in AD 56 and praetor in 62. He was exiled to an island for maiestas shortly thereafter; although he was recalled in 66, he was again exiled in AD 70 under the Flavians.

Sosianus held the plebeian tribunate in AD 56. While tribune, he fell into conflict with a Vibullius, who was then praetor. Sosianus had ordered the release of "some disorderly claqueurs" that Vibullius had previously imprisoned. Sosianus was censured by the senate, which approved of the arrests, and his orders were overturned. In response to the incident, further restrictions were placed upon the increasingly powerless office of tribune by the senate, including the revocation of their veto over consuls and praetors and making their legal rulings subject to review by the consuls.

Despite his political wrongdoing earlier in his career, Sosianus held the office of praetor in 62, where he fell again into scandal. He recited libellous verses he had written about Nero at a large gathering at the house of Marcus Ostorius Scapula, where he was subsequently accused of treason under the lex maiastatis by Cossutianus Capito, a well-known delator. Found guilty, he was initially sentenced to death but Publius Clodius Thrasea Paetus convinced the senate to exile him instead.

Four years later, in AD 66, Sosianus became himself a delator in exile and, after befriending an astrologer called Pammenes, accused the influential Publius Anteius Rufus and Marcus Ostorius Scapula of consulting astrologers. Sosianus was temporarily returned to Rome and the two men accused were forced to suicide. He apparently continued as an informant until Nero's downfall. In AD 70, after Nero's death, Sosianus was again exiled under the new regime. While the formal charge was breaking his original sentence of exile in 62, that was a pretext for his informing under Nero, with Gaius Licinius Mucianus offering up Sosianus along with fellow informer Octavius Sagitta as scapeboats in an attempt to protect some of the more senior informers. After this, Sosianus disappears from historical records.

== Bibliography ==
- "Antistius Sosianus". Prosopographia imperii Romani (in Latin) (2nd ed.). 1933. p. 146.
- Rogers, Robert Samuel (1949). "A criminal trial of AD 70 (Tacitus, Histories, 4.44)". Transactions and Proceedings of the American Philological Association. 80: 347–350. doi:10.2307/283525. ISSN 0065-9711. JSTOR 283525.
- Rogers, Robert Samuel (1952). "A Tacitean pattern in narrating treason trials". Transactions and Proceedings of the American Philological Association. 83: 279–311. JSTOR 283391.
- Rutledge, Steve (2023). "Antistius Sosianus". In Pagán, Victoria Emma (ed.). Tacitus Encyclopedia. Wiley. ISBN 978-1-119-11456-7.
