= Titus Clodius Eprius Marcellus =

1st century AD Roman senator and consul

Titus Clodius Eprius Marcellus (died AD 79) was a Roman senator, twice consul, best known for his prosecution of the Stoic senator Thrasea Paetus and his bitter quarrel with Helvidius Priscus. Eprius was also notorious for his ability to ingratiate himself with the reigning Emperors – especially Nero and Vespasian – and his hostility to any senatorial opposition, but in the last year of Vespasian, in circumstances that remain obscure, he was accused of treason and committed suicide.

== Life ==
Eprius was a homo novus, "said to have been born in Capua" from a family of no social distinction. His filiation and tribe is known from an honorary inscription found in Capua but now in the museum in Naples. Based on the fact his father's praenomen was Marcus, Ronald Syme suggested that he was born an Eprius M.f. who was adopted by a T. Clodius; the only two praenomina for the rare nomen Eprius are Marcus and Lucius. Despite that many Marci Clodii are known, Olli Salomies finds this theory "very likely".

He may have benefited from the patronage of the Emperor Claudius's powerful minister Lucius Vitellius, who caused him to be made praetor for a day – the last day of the year 48. According to an inscription recovered at Paphos, in the earlier part of his career he commanded a legion, was legate of Lycia et Pamphylia (in the period 53–56) and proconsul of Cyprus. He was noted as a skilful but fierce and angry orator who "blazed with his eyes, countenance and voice". Eprius was suffect consul for the nundinium of September–December 62 as the colleague of Quintus Junius Marullus.

At the trial of Thrasea Paetus on a trumped-up charge of treason Eprius was the principal prosecutor, asserting that Thrasea was a traitor to Roman tradition and religion. This was held against him by Thrasea's son-in-law Helvidius Priscus, who in 68 impeached Eprius, but later dropped the charge, as the condemnation of Eprius would have involved a number of other senators. In December 69, when Vespasian had just gained victory in the civil war of that year, Helvidius, as praetor-elect, attacked Eprius's former conduct in the Senate; Eprius defended himself vigorously as one of those loyal servants "who had striven to serve the State under bad Emperors". It was, he said, "all very well to emulate Brutus and Cato in fortitude: but one was only a senator, and they had all been slaves together."

In the sequel Eprius rose to become one of Vespasian's closest friends and advisers. He could boast of membership in two of the most prestigious priesthoods of Imperial Rome, the sodales Augustales and augur. In 70–73 he held the Proconsulate of Asia, anomalously extended to three years, then returned to Rome for his second suffect consulship in 74 as the colleague of Quintus Petillius Cerialis. At this time Helvidius Priscus was banished and later murdered, supposedly against Vespasian's wishes; some saw the hand of Eprius in this murder. In 79 he was apparently involved in plotting with the former Vitellian general Aulus Caecina Alienus against the Flavian dynasty. Arraigned before the senate and condemned, Eprius cut his own throat with a razor.

== See also ==
- List of Roman praetors

== Notes ==
Political offices
Preceded by Publius Marius, and Quintus Manlius Ancharius Tarquitius Saturninus as Ordinary consuls	Suffect consul of the Roman Empire; 62 with Quintus Junius Marullus	Succeeded by Gaius Memmius Regulus, and Lucius Verginius Rufus as Ordinary consuls
Preceded by Lucius Junius Quintus Vibius Crispus II, and Titus III	Suffect consul of the Roman Empire; 74 with Quintus Petillius Cerialis Caesius Rufus II	Succeeded by unknown, then Gaius Pomponius, and Lucius Manlius Patruinus as Suffect consuls
