= Paconius Agrippinus =

1st century AD Roman Stoic philosopher

Paconius Agrippinus was a Stoic philosopher of the 1st century. His father was put to death by the Roman emperor Tiberius on a charge of treason. Agrippinus himself was accused at the same time as Thrasea, around 67 AD, and was banished from Italy. As a philosopher he was spoken of with praise by Epictetus.

== Works ==
Though Agrippinus's works are not known or preserved, much of our knowledge comes from the discourses of Epictetus. In order to explain to his learners how a Stoic should behave, Epictetus also used popular historical figures. Agrippinus, because of his ability to go against popular sentiment and remain oblivious to happenings beyond his influence, was one of those figures. It may seem curious that while there are no great works or books credited to his name, Agrippinus is known as a philosopher.
