= Fannia =

Wife of Helvidius Priscus (fl. 1st century)

Fannia (fl. around 100 AD) was a woman of ancient Rome, notable as the granddaughter of Arria Major and daughter of Arria the Younger.

== Life ==
Fannia is recorded in the writings of Pliny the Younger as a woman of fortitude and respectability. As with her grandmother, Fannia is described as a political rebel in her own right. She was married to Helvidius Priscus and followed him twice into exile, once by Nero for sympathising with two outcasts (Brutus and Cassius), then by Vespasian for opposing his reign.

Eventually, Fannia herself was exiled in 93 AD for instigating the creation and publication of a biographical book about her husband under the rule of Domitian. The execution of Herennius Senecio for his own involvement gives us insight into this "mild" sentence of hers. During the trial of Senecio, he blamed the book on Fannia as she had asked him to write it, a statement that Fannia confirmed. She was asked if, and confirmed that, she had given Senecio her husband's diaries. Pliny writes that "she did not utter a single word to reduce the danger to herself." When her possessions were seized, Fannia managed to save the diaries and biography of her husband and even took them with her into exile.

In 103 AD, Pliny recorded that Fannia had "contracted this illness." She had been nursing a relative (Junia) from an unnamed "serious illness" and, since Junia was a Vestal Virgin, she had been obliged to leave Vesta's hearth and go into the care of a matron. Whilst taking care of her, Fannia herself fell ill, and is described by Pliny thus: "She has constant fever and a cough that is getting worse; she is emaciated and generally in decline. Only her spirit is vigorous, worthy of her husband." Though Pliny the Younger was regularly prone to exaggeration, his repeated expressions of worry suggest that the illness was one from which Fannia did not recover.

== Name ==
Whilst examining the works and names mentioned by Pliny the Younger, Sir Ronald Syme, historian and classicist, in his paper, "People in Pliny," writes, "why she should be called 'Fannia', [I have] no clue." Sir Ronald saw no reason as to why Arria Major's granddaughter would be called Fannia. This statement was made in regard to a possible connection to a Roman barrister named C. Fannius, who wrote the biographies of Nero's victims. In Syme's paper, 'People in Pliny', it reads: C. Fannius (v, 5). Barrister who wrote biographies of Nero's victims. Supposed a relative of Fannia,' the daughter of the Patavine (P. Clodius) Thrasea Paetus by his marriage with Arria, the daughter of A. Caecina Paetus (suff.37), cf. Groag in PIR2, F I I6.
