= Jean-Baptiste Théodon =

French sculptor (1645–1713)

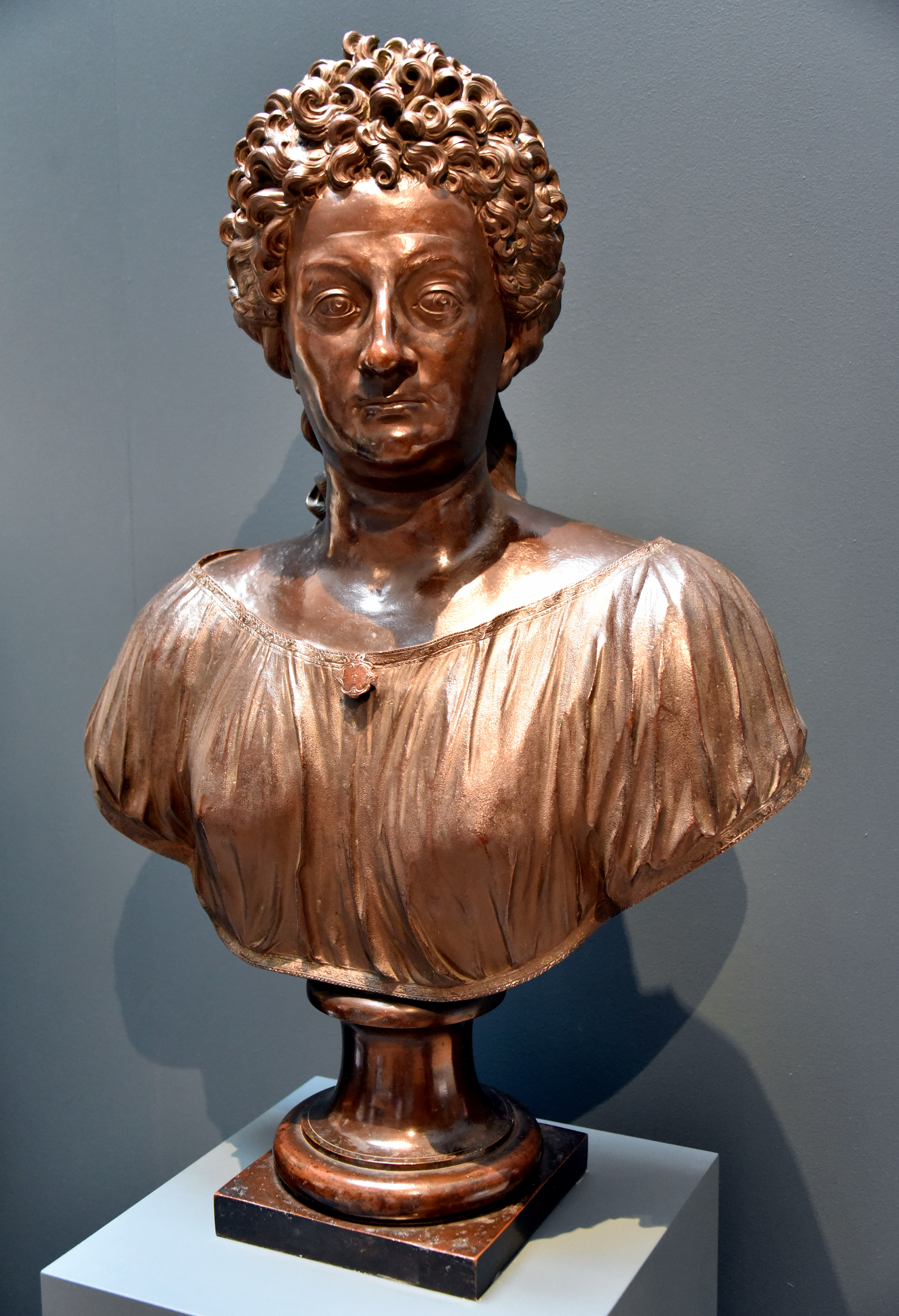
Queen Kristina of Sweden, c. 1697, by Jean Baptiste Théodon. Nationalmuseum, Stockholm, Sweden

Jean-Baptiste Théodon (1645–1713) was a French sculptor.

Born at Vendrest (Seine-et-Marne), he formed his style working in the Manufacture royale des Gobelins organized by Jean-Baptiste Colbert, who saw to it that he was admitted to the newly founded French Academy at Rome in 1675. Following the successive reinstallations of the Academy, in the company of his wife, Théodon remained in Rome for three decades, working for the popes at the Lateran and the Basilica of St. Peter, and above all for the Jesuits.

After a brief visit to Paris in 1704, he returned once and for all in 1705, to participate, among sculptors of greater renown, in the installation of the Chapelle Royale at Versailles under the general direction of Jules Hardouin-Mansart, whose last major project this was, and the more immediate supervision of Robert de Cotte.
