= Servius Cornelius Scipio Salvidienus Orfitus =

Name of men in the early Roman Empire

Servius Cornelius Scipio Salvidienus Orfitus was the name of several Roman men who lived during the early Roman Empire. They were descendants of Orfitus who was adopted by Servius Cornelius Scipio, an otherwise unknown member of the patrician branch of the Cornelii Scipiones.

At least six members of this family used this name, all of whom were direct male descendants of the earliest known member of this branch, the consul of 51. Except for the first two generations, little is known about any of them.

== Servius Cornelius Scipio Salvidienus Orfitus (consul 51) ==
Servius Cornelius Scipio Salvidienus Orfitus was ordinary consul in AD 51 as the colleague of the emperor Claudius. He was one of the victims of Marcus Aquilius Regulus, the delator during the reign of Nero.

== Servius Cornelius Scipio Salvidienus Orfitus (consul 1st century) ==
Servius Cornelius Scipio Salvidienus Orfitus was a suffect consul in some year prior to 87; his colleague has not been identified. He was the son of the consul of AD 51. He was also a victim of imperial suspicion and was first banished to an island by the emperor Domitian, then later executed.

== Servius Cornelius Scipio Salvidienus Orfitus (consul 110) ==
Servius Cornelius Scipio Salvidienus Orfitus was ordinary consul in AD 110 as the colleague of Marcus Peducaeus Priscinus. He was the son of the previous Orfitus. The only other fact known of his life is that he was Urban prefect of Rome during the reign of Antoninus Pius. Ronald Syme states that Orfitus succeeded Lucius Catilius Severus (whom Hadrian removed from that post), and although the Historia Augusta states that he asked Antoninus Pius to be released from the office, Syme speculates that this language "may mask a swift demotion".

== Servius Cornelius Scipio Salvidienus Orfitus (proconsul of Africa) ==
Servius Cornelius Scipio Salvidienus Orfitus is known through inscriptions to have been proconsul of Africa in 163/164. From this it can be inferred that this Orfitus was suffect consul around 146. It is surmised he was the son of the consul of 110.

It was assumed at one point that this Orfitus was also the ordinary consul of 149, but more recent research has identified that Orfitus as Lucius Sergius Salvidienus Scipio Orfitus, a member of the gens Sergia.

== Servius Cornelius Scipio Salvidienus Orfitus (consul 178) ==
Servius Cornelius Scipio Salvidienus Orfitus was ordinary consul in AD 178 with Decimus Velius Rufus as his colleague. The Senatus consulta Orfitianum, which modified the Lex Fufia Caninia to broaden the scope of testamentary manumission. It is surmised he was the son of the previous Orfitus.

== Servius Cornelius Scipio Salvidienus Orfitus (salius Palatinus) ==
Servius Cornelius Scipio Salvidienus Orfitus was a member of the Salii Palatinii, an ancient Roman priesthood for the years 189 and 190. It is surmised he was the son of the previous Orfitus. There is no record of this Orfitus acceding to the consulate; while this may indicate that he died before the age of 31 or 32, the earliest point a Patrician could be a consul, attestations of suffect consuls become much more scarce after 180 and evidence of his consulate may simply await recovery.
