= Fyodor Bronnikov =

Russian painter (1827–1902)

- Фёдор Бронников
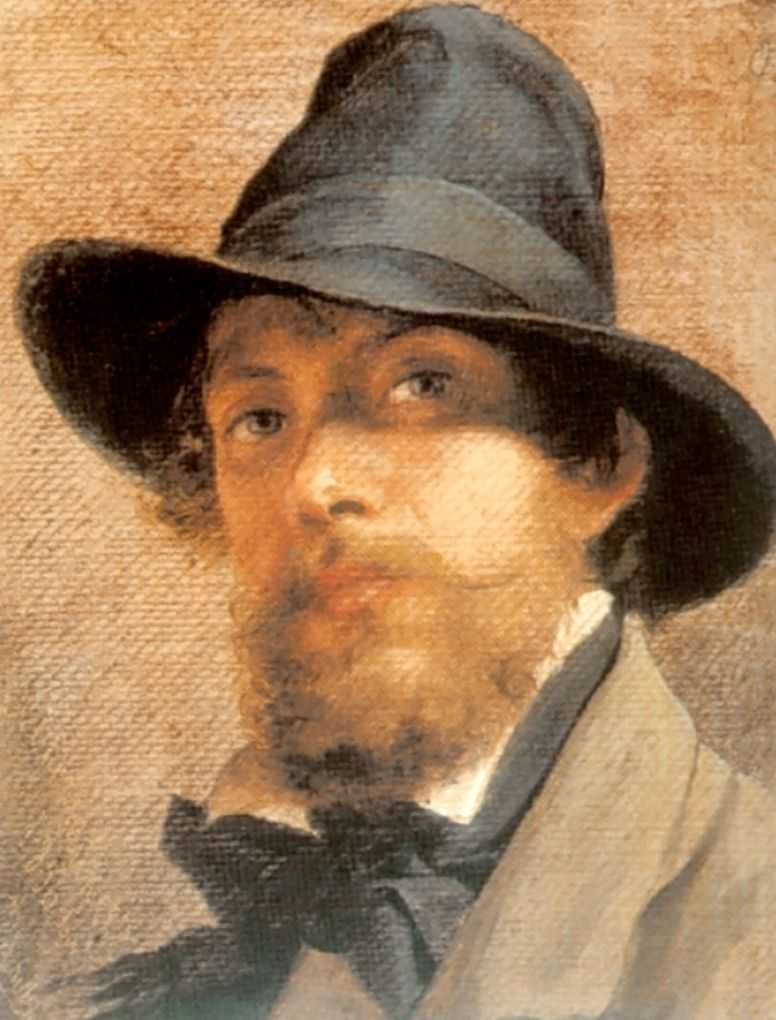
- Self-portrait (1856)
- Born: 29 September [O.S. 17 September] 1827; Shadrinsk, Perm Governorate, Russian Empire
- Died: 14 September 1902 (aged 74); Anticoli Corrado, Rome Province, Italy
- Education: Professor by rank (1864)
- Alma mater: Imperial Academy of Arts
- Occupation: Russian painter
- Movement: Peredvizhniki
- Awards: Big Gold Medal of the Imperial Academy of Arts (1853)

Fyodor Andreyevich Bronnikov (Russian: Фёдор Андреевич Бронников; 17 September 1827–14 September 1902) was a Russian-born history and genre painter who spent most of his life in Italy.

== Biography ==
He displayed an early affinity for drawing and received his first art lessons from his father, who was a decorative painter. At the age of sixteen, when his father died, he packed his bags and went to Saint Petersburg, hoping to enter the Imperial Academy of Arts. After failing to gain admission, he became an apprentice in the workshop of Evstafy Bernardsky, a well known woodcutter. His talent drew the attention of the sculptor Pyotr Clodt, who arranged for him to audit classes at the Academy. In 1850, he was able to become a regular student, and worked with Alexey Markov. He graduated in 1853 and was awarded a stipend to study in Italy for his graduation painting, The Mother of God.

The following year, he settled in Rome and established his own studio on Via Vittoria, near the Villa Borghese. He painted a wide variety of canvases, including landscapes, village scenes, genre scenes, historical works and, of course, portraits of the city's notable citizens. His health was poor, so he remained there after his stipend expired, to take advantage of the warm climate.

He paid a long visit home from 1863 to 1865. While there, the Academy awarded him a professorship in history painting for his depiction of Horace reading his satires to Gaius Maecenas. He also came into contact with a group of dissident artists who would later be known as the Peredvizhniki; which inspired him to paint a series of genre works on peasant life. Later, he became a member of the group and regularly sent paintings from Italy to show in their exhibitions. He was awarded the Order of St. Anna as well as being named an Academician and an honorary member of the Academy. During this period he created one of his best known works: The Cursed Field (1878), an indictment of slavery.

He died near Rome and was buried in the Protestant Cemetery. Despite having lived in Italy for most of his life, he left over 300 paintings and drawings and the equivalent of 400 Rubles to establish an art school in Shadrinsk. The school was not established until the Soviet period and the works were used as the basis for a museum.

== Artistic method ==
Fyodor Bronnikov was a portrait painter whose works in this genre are noted for their naturalistic representation and psychological depth. In his landscapes, he sought to convey the emotional state of the surrounding world. The artist’s appreciation of nature developed during his childhood in the Trans-Urals. In letters to his relatives in Shadrinsk he often recalls the beauty of his native places. "No boundless fields here as you have in Russia, no dense forests... and that's a pity. I love the vastness and our Russian fields, like a limitless sea," he shared his feelings with his countrymen.

Most of his works are in Russia, but many have also been acquired by amateurs from the UK, the US, Hungary, Italy, and Denmark.

== Selected paintings ==
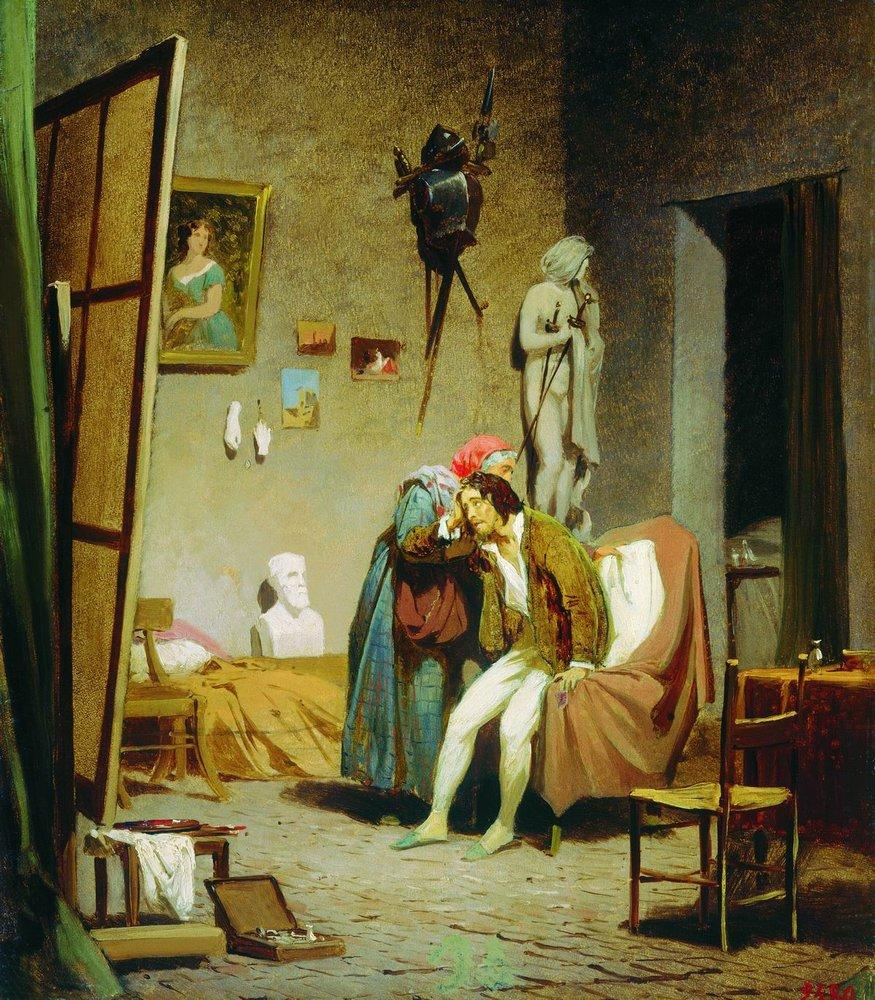
The Sick Artist

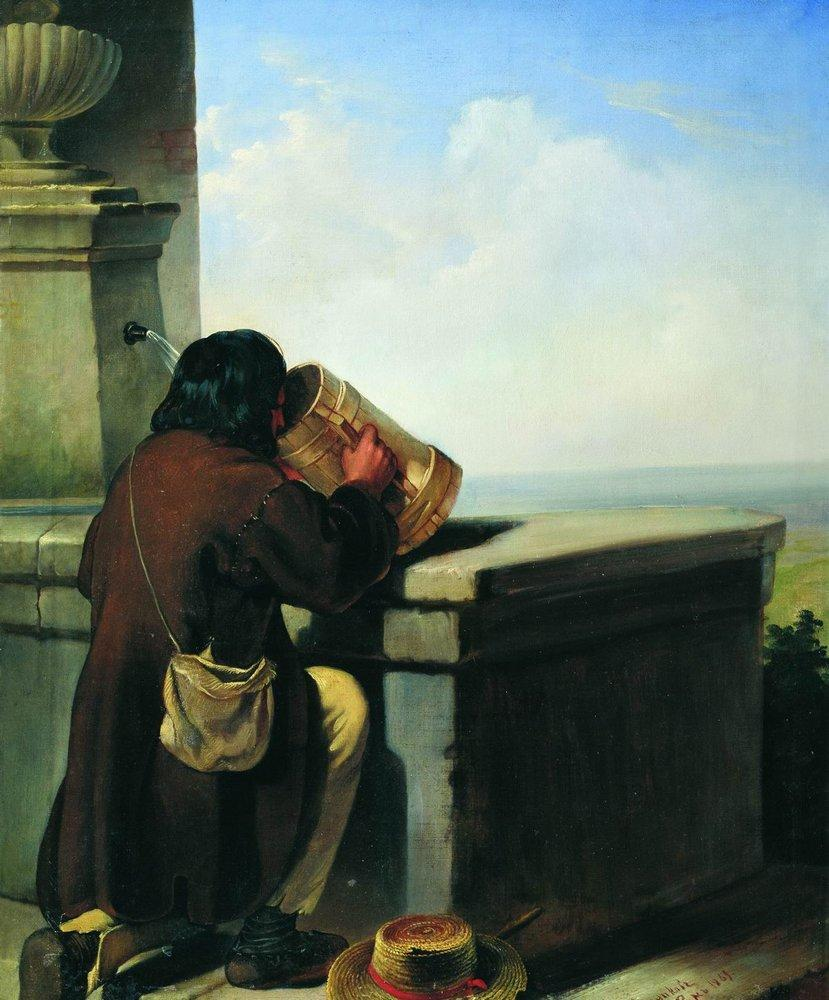
The Wayfarer

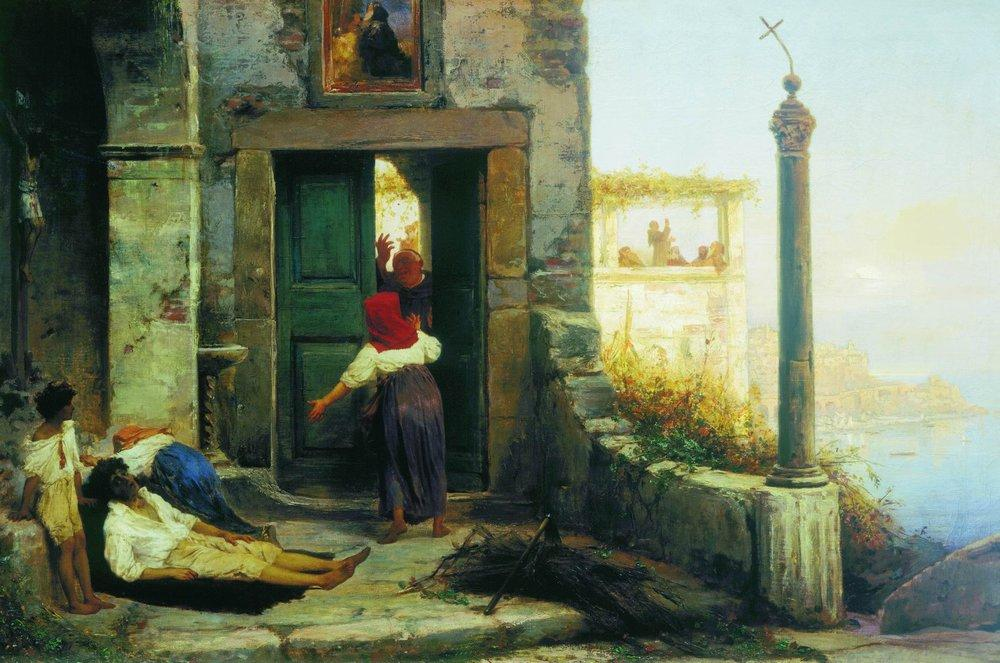
Sick Man at the Walls of a Monastery

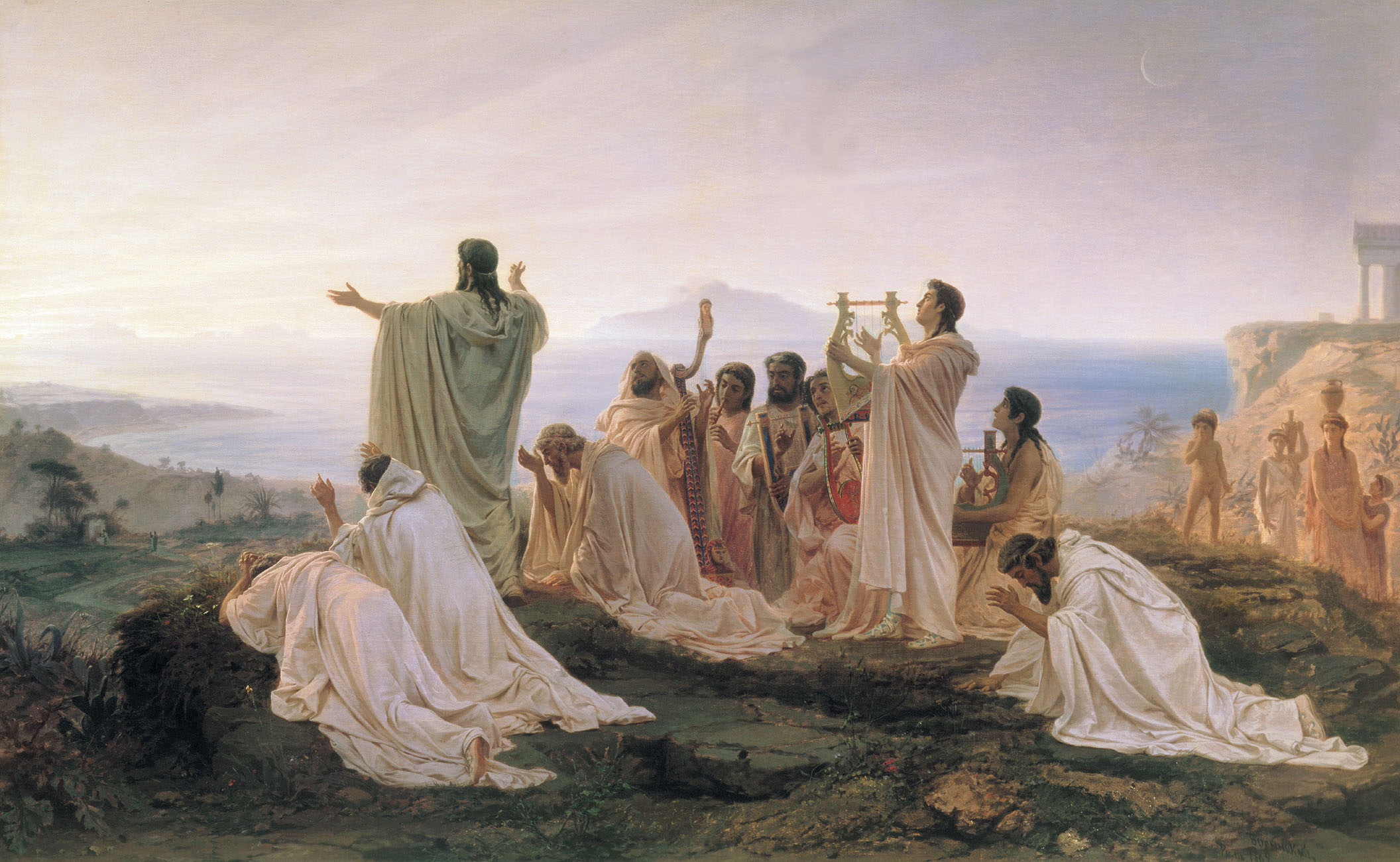
Pythagoreans Celebrate
the Sunrise

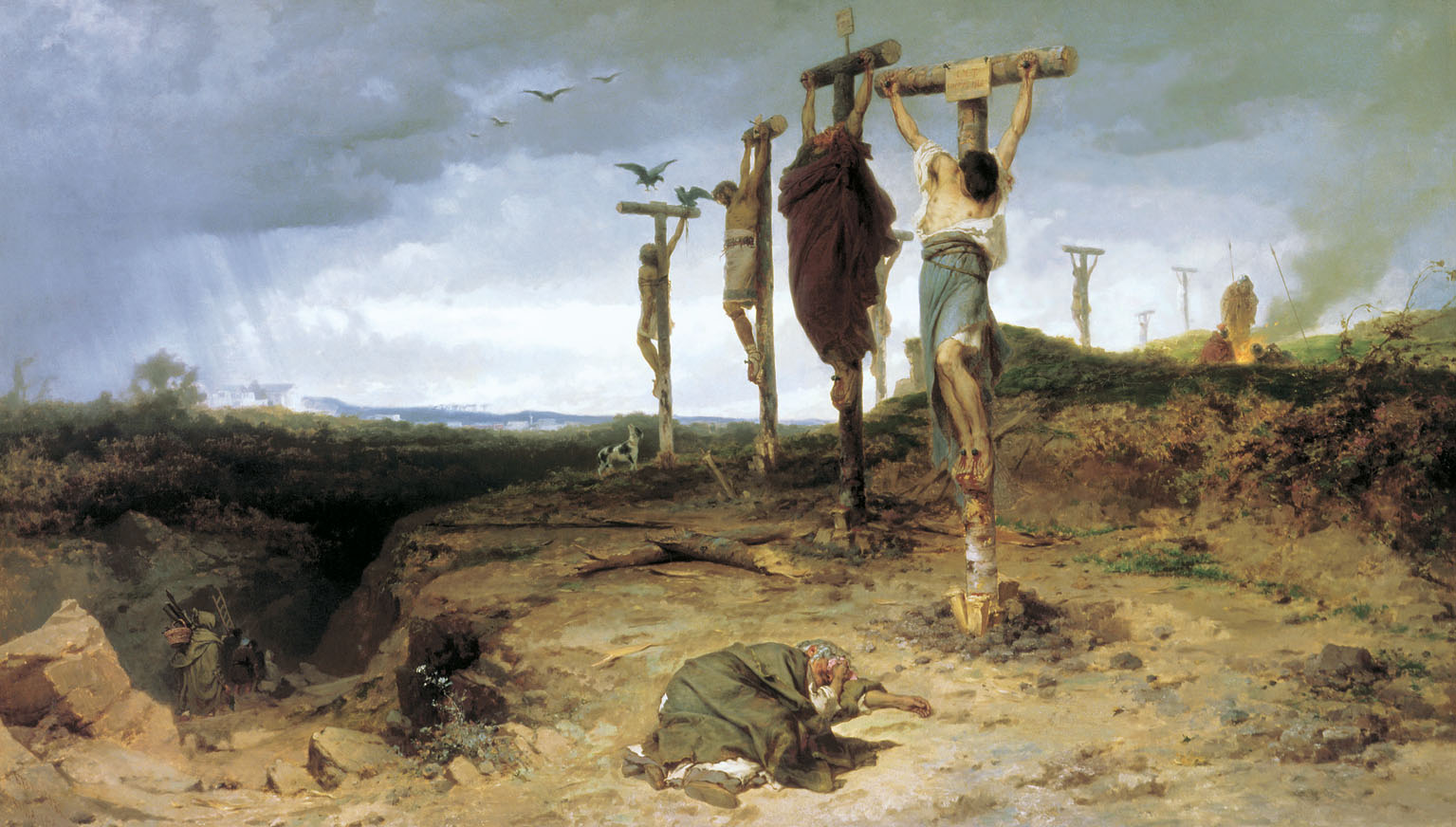
The Cursed Field
(executed slaves)

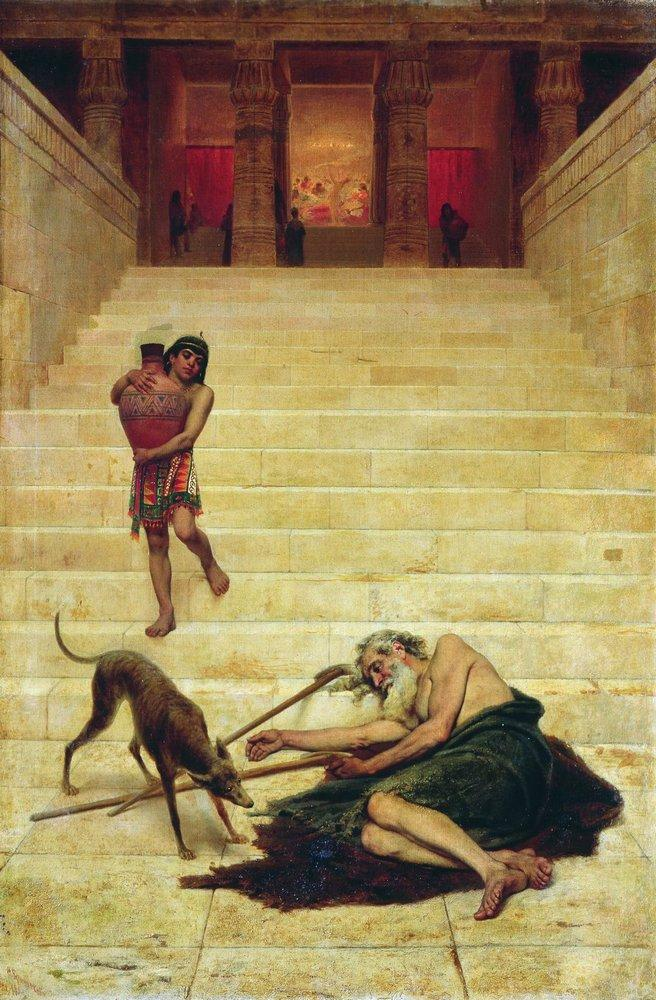
The Rich Man and Lazarus
