= Helvidius Priscus =

1st century AD Roman philosopher and statesman

Helvidius Priscus, Stoic philosopher and statesman, lived during the reigns of Nero, Galba, Otho, Vitellius and Vespasian.

== Biography ==
When Vespasian sent for Helvidius Priscus and commanded him not to go into the senate, he replied, "It is in your power not to allow me to be a member of the senate, but so long as I am, I must go in." "Well, go in then," says the emperor, "but say nothing." "Do not ask my opinion, and I will be silent." "But I must ask your opinion." "And I must say what I think right." "But if you do, I shall put you to death." "When then did I tell you that I am immortal? You will do your part, and I will do mine: it is your part to kill; it is mine to die, but not in fear: yours to banish me; mine to depart without sorrow." Epictetus, Discourses, 1.2.19–21

Helvidius came from town of Cluviae, and his father had been the senior centurion of a legion. According to Tacitus, from early youth he devoted his brilliant intellect to academic studies, not (as so often happens) in order to disguise ease and idleness under a pretentious name, but to arm himself more stoutly against the unpredictable fluctuations of fortune of a public career. As citizen, senator, husband, son-in-law and friend, he met the varied obligations of life in a consistent way, showing contempt for wealth, stubborn adherence to the right course of action and courage in the face of danger. Like his father-in-law, Thrasea Paetus, whose daughter Fannia he had taken as his second wife, Priscus was distinguished for his ardent and courageous republicanism. Although he repeatedly offended his rulers, he held several high offices. During Nero's reign he was quaestor of Achaea and tribune of the plebs (AD 56); he restored peace and order in Armenia, and gained the respect and confidence of the provincials. His declared sympathy with Brutus and Cassius occasioned his banishment in 66.

Having been recalled to Rome by Galba in 68, he at once impeached Eprius Marcellus, the accuser of Thrasea Paetus, but dropped the charge, as the condemnation of Marcellus would have involved a number of senators. As praetor elect Priscus ventured to oppose Vitellius in the senate (Tacitus, Hist. ii. 91), and as praetor (70) he maintained, in opposition to Vespasian, that the management of the finances ought to be left to the discretion of the senate. He proposed that the Temple of Jupiter Best and Greatest, which had been destroyed towards the end of the Year of Four Emperors, should be restored at the public expense. Lastly, Priscus saluted Vespasian by his private name, and did not recognize him as emperor in his praetorian edicts.

At length he was banished a second time, and shortly afterwards was executed by Vespasian's order. His life, in the form of a warm panegyric, written at his widow's request by Herennius Senecio, caused its author's death in the reign of Domitian.

== Family ==
Helvidius Priscus is known to have two children by Fannia: a son, Helvidius Priscus, later suffect consul, who was banished and likely executed by Domitian; and a daughter, Helvidia, who married Marcus Annius Herennius Pollio. He probably also had a granddaughter, Helvidia Priscilla, who married Lucius Vipstanus Poplicola Messalla. Through her, he has known descendants into at least the 6th century.

== Modern appearances ==
- James Madison wrote under the pseudonym Helvidius in 1793, in response to Alexander Hamilton's Pacificus columns on American neutrality in the French Revolutionary Wars.
- The Helvidius Group of Columbia University, publisher of the Journal of Politics & Society, takes its name from the statesman.
