= Peducaea gens =

Ancient Roman family

The gens Peducaea, occasionally written Paeducaea or Peducea, was a plebeian family at ancient Rome. Members of this gens occur in history from the end of the second century BC, and from then to the time of Antoninus Pius, they steadily increased in prominence. The first of the Peducaii to obtain the consulship was Titus Peducaeus in 35 BC.

== Origin ==
The gentile-forming suffix -aeus occurs in a number of Latin names, many of which seem to be of Oscan or Umbrian origin, and cognate to the more regular endings -eius and -aius, both of which were sometimes reduced to -ius in Latin. The ending -aeus seems to be derived from nominative forms ending in -aes, which was typical of the Umbri, as well as the Paeligni, an Oscan-speaking people.

== Praenomina ==
The main praenomina of the Peducaei were Sextus, Titus, and Lucius, all of which were common throughout Roman history. There are also several instances of the common praenomina Gaius and Quintus. Other names occur infrequently.

== Members ==
This list includes abbreviated praenomina. For an explanation of this practice, see filiation.

- Sextus Peducaeus, tribune of the plebs in 113 BC, reopened an investigation into a charge of incestum (unchastity) made against three of the Vestal Virgins, who had been acquitted by the College of Pontiffs. He had Lucius Cassius Longinus Ravilla appointed to head the inquiry, which led to the execution of two of the accused.
- Titus Peducaeus, named in the Fasti Urbisalvienses between the consuls and the censors of 102 BC, but his magistracy is not preserved.
- Sextus Peducaeus, probably praetor in 77 BC, and propraetor in Sicilia from 76 to 75 BC. Cicero served as his quaestor, and speaks highly of his integrity, which he contrasts with the corruption and rapacity of his successor, Verres, who had cultivated Peducaeus' friendship.
- Sextus Peducaeus Sex. f., a close friend of both Atticus and Cicero. In 48 BC, during the Civil War, Caesar appointed Peducaeus governor of Sardinia. He was propraetor in Spain in 40.
- Gaius Peducaeus Sex. f., afterward Gaius Curtius Peducaeanus (Note: In his oration Post Reditum in Senatu, Cicero refers to Peducaeanus as Manius Curtius or Manius Curius (depending on the manuscript). Manius was the favoured praenomen of the Curii, but is not known among the Curtii. However, the two gentes were easily confused. Broughton gives the name as Gaius Curtius, the name given in Cicero's Epistulae ad Familiares.), probably the younger son of the propraetor to whom Cicero was quaestor, was adopted by Gaius Curtius. He was praetor in 50 BC.
- Lucius Peducaeus, assisted in the defense of Marcus Aemilius Scaurus, which Cicero had undertaken, in 54 BC.
- Gaius Peducaeus, a legate under the consul Gaius Vibius Pansa in 43 BC. He fell at the Battle of Mutina.
- Titus Peducaeus, consul suffectus ex Kal. Sept. in 35 BC.
- Lucius Peducaeus Fronto, a procurator at Ephesus in Asia during the reign of Tiberius.
- Lucius Peducaeus Colo(nus?), praefectus of Roman Egypt in AD 70.
- Marcus Peducaeus Saenianus, consul suffectus ex Kal. Mai. in AD 89, served until the Kalends of September.
- Quintus Peducaeus Priscinus, consul in AD 93, from the beginning of the year to the Kalends of March.
- Marcus Peducaeus Priscinus, consul in AD 110, and afterward proconsul of Asia.
- Marcus Peducaeus M. f. Stloga Priscinus, consul in AD 141, and subsequently proconsul of Asia.
- Peducaeus Marcianus, served in a company of archers, according to a military diploma dating to AD 160.
- Peducaeus Diodorus, named in an inscription from Ostia, dating from AD 165.
- Marcus Peducaeus M. f. M. n. Plautius Quintillus, (Note: Cassius Dio, who paints a most unflattering portrait of Plautius, refers to him as "Plautianus".) consul in AD 177 with his brother-in-law, the future emperor Commodus. He was the adopted son of Stloga Priscinus, and exercised tremendous influence over Septimius Severus, who at last ordered his death circa AD 203.
- Peducaea, mentioned in an inscription at Amiternum in Sabinum.
- Peducaea, the wife of Eutyches, buried at Rome.
- Peducaea, buried at Tibur in Latium.
- Peducaeus, brother of Ateula Malussa, named in an inscription from Lugdunum.
- Peduceus, buried at Albanum in Latium, aged twenty-one.
- Gaius Peducaeus C. f., son of one of the Augustales, buried at Rome.
- Lucius Peduceus, named in a funerary inscription from Albanum.
- Quintus Peducaeus P. f., an augur, named in an inscription from Spoletium in Umbria.
- Quintus Peducaeus St. f., named in an inscription from Nursia in Samnium.
- Titus Peducaeus, dedicated a monument at Ravenna to Appaea Pia.
- Titus Peducaeus St. f., named in an inscription from Nursia.
- Titus Peducaeus T. l., named in an inscription from Rome.
- Sextus Peducaeus Sex. Cn. Petroni l. Anteros, freedman of Sextus and Gnaeus Petronius, buried at Rome.
- Lucius Peducaeus Apollinaris, buried at Sulci in Sardinia.
- Publius Peducaeus Boletanus, buried at Aquileia in the province of Venetia and Histria, aged thirty.
- Lucius Peducaeus Charito, husband of Aurunceia Felicula, to whom he dedicated a monument at Interamna Nahars in Umbria.
- Peducaea T. l. Daphne, a freedwoman buried at Rome, was the wife of Titus Peducaeus Faustus.
- Sextus Peducaeus Dio, named in an inscription from Rome.
- Sextus Peducaeus Dionysius, a bookseller buried at Rome.
- Sextus Peducaeus Dionysius, husband of Baebia Delphis, to whom he dedicated a monument at Tibur.
- Peducaea T. Ↄ. l. Epangellusa, freed as a young girl, and buried at Rome, aged ten.
- Peducaea Ephire, named in an inscription from Venusia, dating from the middle of the first century to the middle of the second.
- Sextus Peducaeus Sex. l. Eutyches, a freedman buried at Mutina in northern Italy.
- Peducaea Fausta, named in an inscription from Rome, dating to the first century.
- Titus Peducaeus T. l. Faustus, a freedman buried at Rome, was the husband of Peducaea Daphne.
- Lucius Peducaeus Felix, dedicated a monument at Rome to his sister, Peducaea Tyche.
- Peducaea Festa, according to an inscription from Rome, gave a pot to the singing teacher Gaius Julius Coscus.
- Titus Peducaeus T. f. Florus, buried at Rome, aged twenty-one.
- Peducaea Fortunata, dedicated a monument at Rome to her son, Gaius Julius Felix, aged six years, ten months, and seven days.
- Peducaea Galatia, wife of Titus Paeducaeus Oriens, buried at Ostia.
- Peducaea Graptusa, buried at Rome, aged two years, nine months, and fifteen days.
- Sextus Peducaeus Hecticus, named in an inscription from Venusia.
- Peducaea Hellas, buried at Rome.
- Sextus Peducaeus Sex. f. Herophilus, donated to the cult of Isis and Serapis at Anticaria in Hispania Baetica.
- Peducaea Sex. l. Hilara, a freedwoman, built a tomb at Mutina for herself and Sextus Peducaeus Hilarus.
- Sextus Peducaeus Sex. l. Hilarus, buried at Mutina in a tomb built by Peducaea Hilara.
- Paeducaeus Ingenuus, buried at Rome.
- Peducaea Irene, buried at Rome.
- Sextus Peducaeus Jucundus, one of the Augustales, named in an inscription from Venusia.
- Lucia Peducaea Juliana, wife of Lucius Nonius Verus, buried at Mutina, aged thirteen years, forty-seven days, having been married five months and twenty days.
- Peducaea Lesche, buried at Rome, aged, twenty-two.
- Gaius Peducaeus Marcellus, buried at the present site of Decimoputzu in Sardinia, aged three years, five months, six days.
- Peducaea Musa, buried at Albanum.
- Lucius Paeducaeus Natalis, patron of Paeducaea Zmyrina, buried at Rome, aged eighty years, nine months, and twenty days.
- Titus Peducaeus Oriens, the husband of Peducaea Galatia, to whom he dedicated a monument at Ostia.
- Peducaea Saturnina, dedicated a monument at Rome to her husband, Lucius Aemilius Cleobulus, buried at Rome, aged forty-four.
- Lucius Peducaeus Saturninus, husband of Peducaea Severina, named in an inscription from the Alban Hills.
- Peducaea Severa, named in an inscription from Rome.
- Peducaea Severina, wife of Lucius Peducaeus Saturninus, named in an inscription from the Alban Hills.
- Titus Peducaeus T. f. Severus, buried at Rome, aged eight.
- Peducaea Q. f. Sextia, daughter of Quintus Peducaeus Spes, wife of the flamen of Carthage, dedicated a monument at the present site of Choud el Batel, formerly part of Africa Proconsularis, to her son, Longeius.
- Quintus Peducaeus Spes, father of Peducaea, the flamen's wife.
- Peducaea Q. f. Tertia, named in an inscription from Arretium in Etruria.
- Peducaea Tyche, sister of Lucius Peducaeus Felix, buried at Rome, aged twenty-six years, sixteen days.
- Paeducaea Zmyrina, client of Lucius Paeducaeus Natalis, to whom she dedicated a monument at Rome.

== See also ==
- List of Roman gentes

== Bibliography ==
- Marcus Tullius Cicero, De Finibus Bonorum et Malorum, De Natura Deorum, Epistulae ad Atticum, Epistulae ad Familiares, In Verrem, Post Reditum in Senatu, Pro Flacco.
- Quintus Asconius Pedianus, Commentarius in Oratio Ciceronis Pro Milone (Commentary on Cicero's Oration Pro Milone), Commentarius in Oratio Ciceronis Pro Scauro (Commentary on Cicero's Oration Pro Scauro).
- Appianus Alexandrinus (Appian), Bellum Civile (The Civil War).
- Lucius Cassius Dio Cocceianus (Cassius Dio), Roman History.
- Aelius Lampridius, Aelius Spartianus, Flavius Vopiscus, Julius Capitolinus, Trebellius Pollio, and Vulcatius Gallicanus, Historia Augusta (Augustan History).
- Dictionary of Greek and Roman Biography and Mythology, William Smith, ed., Little, Brown and Company, Boston (1849).
- Theodor Mommsen et alii, Corpus Inscriptionum Latinarum (The Body of Latin Inscriptions, abbreviated CIL), Berlin-Brandenburgische Akademie der Wissenschaften (1853–present).
- Notizie degli Scavi di Antichità (News of Excavations from Antiquity, abbreviated NSA), Accademia dei Lincei (1876–present).
- René Cagnat et alii, L'Année épigraphique (The Year in Epigraphy, abbreviated AE), Presses Universitaires de France (1888–present).
- Paul von Rohden, Elimar Klebs, & Hermann Dessau, Prosopographia Imperii Romani (The Prosopography of the Roman Empire, abbreviated PIR), Berlin (1898).
- George D. Hadzsits, Classical Studies in Honor of John C. Rolfe, University of Pennsylvania Press, Philadelphia (1931).
- Alberto Galieti, Contributi alla storia della diocesi suburbicaria di Albano Laziale (Contributions to the History of the Suburbicarian Diocese of Albano Laziale, abbreviated AlbLaz), Vatican City (1948).
- T. Robert S. Broughton, The Magistrates of the Roman Republic, American Philological Association (1952).
- Paul A. Gallivan, "The Fasti for A.D. 70–96", in Classical Quarterly, vol. 31, pp. 186–220 (1981).
- Zeitschrift für Papyrologie und Epigraphik (Journal of Papyrology and Epigraphy, abbreviated ZPE), (1987).
