= List of Roman cognomina =

This is a list of Roman cognomina.

== A ==
- Abercius
- Abito
- Absens
- Abundantius
- Abundius
- Abundus
- Aburianus
- Acacius
- Acaunus
- Acceptus
- Acer
- Achaica
- Achaicus
- Acidinus
- Aciliana
- Acilianus
- Aculeo
- Acutianus
- Acutus
- Adauctus
- Adelphius
- Adiutor
- Adranos
- Adventus
- Aeacus
- Aebutus
- Aedesius
- Aelianus
- Aemiliana
- Aemilianus
- Aenianus
- Aequa
- Aequitas
- Aemilianus
- Aeserninus
- Aeternitas
- Aetius
- Afer
- Afra
- Africana
- Africanus
- Afrinus
- Agaptus
- Agatopus
- Agelastus
- Agilis
- Agorix
- Agricola
- Agrippa
- Agrippianus
- Agrippina
- Agrippinillus
- Agrippinus
- Ahala
- Ahenobarbus
- Albanianus
- Albanus
- Albillus
- Albina
- Albinianus
- Albinius
- Albinus
- Albucillus
- Albucius
- Albus
- Alcimus
- Alethius
- Alienus
- Allectus
- Alogiosus
- Alogius
- Aluredes
- Alypius
- Amabilis
- Amandianus
- Amandinus
- Amandio
- Amandus
- Amans
- Amantillus
- Amantius
- Amarantus
- Amator
- Amatus
- Ambrosius
- Ambustus (associated with gens Fabia)
- Amor
- Amphion
- Ampliatus
- Amplus
- Anatolius
- Andouarto
- Andronicus
- Angelus
- Annaeanus
- Annianus
- Animaequitas
- Anniolus
- Antias
- Antius
- Antiquus
- Antistianus
- Antonianus
- Antonillus
- Antoninus
- Antulla
- Anulinus
- Anulla
- Anullinus
- Apelles
- Apelliana
- Apellinus
- Aper
- Apollinaris
- Apollonarius
- Apollonius
- Appianillus
- Appianus
- Appuleianus
- Aprilis
- Aprillus
- Aprinus
- Apronianus
- Apronillus
- Aprulla
- Apuleianus
- Aquila
- Aquilianus
- Aquilinus
- Aquillianus
- Arator
- Aratus
- Arcadius
- Arcanus
- Arcavius
- Archarius
- Aricinus
- Ariouisti
- Arius
- Armiger
- Arminus
- Arnobius
- Arpagius
- Arrianus
- Arruntianus
- Arruntius
- Artorianus
- Arulenus
- Arvina
- Asellio
- Asellus
- Asiaticus
- Asina
- Asinianus
- Asper
- Asprenas
- Asprenus
- Assanius
- Atianus
- Atilianus
- Atratinus
- Atta
- Attianus
- Attianillus
- Atticianus
- Atticillus
- Atticinus
- Atticus
- Attilianus
- Auctillus
- Auctoritas
- Auctus
- Audaios
- Audax
- Audens
- Aufidianus
- Augendus
- Augur
- Augurinus
- Augurius
- Augustalis
- Augustanus
- Augustinus
- Augustus
- Aurelianus
- Aurelius
- Aureolus
- Aurunculeianus
- Auruncus
- Ausonius
- Auspex
- Auspicatus
- Auxentius
- Auxientius
- Auxiliaris
- Auxilio
- Auxilius
- Avienus
- Aviola
- Avitianus
- Avitillus
- Avitus
- Axilla

== B ==
- Babulla
- Baebianus
- Balbillus
- Balbinus
- Balbus
- Bambalio
- Bamballio
- Banquerius
- Barba
- Barbarus
- Barbatus
- Barbillus
- Barbula
- Baro
- Basilus
- Bassianus
- Bassinus
- Bassus
- Bato
- Belenus
- Belisarius
- Beatus
- Bellator
- Bellicianus
- Bellicus
- Bellus
- Benedictus
- Benignus
- Bestia
- Betto
- Bibaculus
- Bibulus
- Bitucus
- Blaesillus
- Blaesus
- Blandinus
- Blandus
- Blasius
- Blossianus
- Bodenius
- Boethius
- Boetius
- Bolanus
- Bonifatius
- Bonosus
- Bonus
- Bradua
- Briccius
- Bricius
- Briktius
- Britannicus
- Britius
- Brixius
- Brocchillus
- Brocchus
- Bromidus
- Bruccius
- Brucetus
- Bruscius
- Bruttianus
- Brutus
- Bubo
- Bubulcus
- Buca
- Buccio
- Bulbus
- Bulla
- Burcanius
- Burrus
- Buteo

== C ==
- Caecilianus
- Caecina
- Caecinianus
- Caedicianus
- Caelianus
- Caelimontanus (associated with Gens Verginia)
- Caelinus
- Caecus
- Caelestinus
- Caelestius
- Caelianus
- Caelinus
- Caelistis
- Caepio
- Caerellius
- Caesar
- Caesariana
- Caesennianus
- Caesianus
- Caesonianus
- Caesoninus
- Caianillus
- Caianus
- Calacicus
- Calamus
- Calaritanus
- Calatinus
- Calavianus
- Caldus
- Calenus
- Calerus
- Caletus
- Calidianus
- Callidianus
- Callisunus
- Calogerus
- Calpurnianus
- Calpurnis
- Calvinus
- Calvisianus
- Calvus
- Camerinus
- Camerius
- Camillus
- Camosus
- Campanianus
- Campanus
- Campester
- Campilius
- Candidianus
- Candidillus
- Candidinus
- Candidus
- Canianus
- Canidianus
- Canina
- Caninianus
- Cantaber
- Capella
- Caper
- Capito
- Capitolinus
- Capra
- Caprarius
- Capreorus
- Caracturus
- Carantus
- Carbo
- Carinus
- Carius
- Carnifex
- Carus
- Carvilianus
- Casca
- Cassianillus
- Cassianus
- Cassius
- Castinus
- Castorius
- Castus
- Catianus
- Catilina
- Cato
- Catonius
- Cattianus
- Catuarus
- Catullinus
- Catullus
- Catulus
- Catus
- Caudex
- Caudinus
- Celatus
- Celer
- Celerianus
- Celerinus
- Celsillus
- Celsinillus
- Celsinus
- Celsus
- Cenaeus
- Cencius
- Censor
- Censorinillus
- Censorinus
- Censorius
- Centumalus
- Cerialis
- Cerinthus
- Certinus
- Certus
- Cerularius
- Cervianus
- Cervidus
- Cethegus
- Chlorus
- Christianus
- Cicada
- Cicatricula
- Cicero
- Cico
- Cicurinus
- Cicurius
- Cimber
- Cincinnatus
- Cinna
- Cinnianus
- Cita
- Cittinus
- Civilis
- Clarentius
- Clarianus
- Clarus
- Classicianus
- Classicus
- Claudianus
- Claudillus
- Claudus
- Clemens
- Clementianus
- Clementillus
- Clementinus
- Clodianus
- Clodus
- Cocceianus
- Cocles
- Coelianus
- Coelinus
- Cogitatus
- Colias
- Collatinus
- Colonus
- Columbanus
- Columella
- Coma
- Comes
- Comitianus
- Comitinus
- Commidius
- Commidus
- Commius
- Commodus
- Communis
- Concessianus
- Concessus
- Congrio
- Constans
- Constantianus
- Constantillus
- Constantinus
- Constantius
- Coranus
- Corbulo
- Corculum
- Cordillus
- Cordus
- Coriolanus
- Cornelianus
- Cornicen
- Cornix
- Cornutus
- Corvinus
- Corvus
- Cosmas
- Cossus
- Cotentinus
- Cotta
- Crassillus
- Crassus
- Cratippus
- Cremutius
- Crescens
- Crescentianus
- Crescentillus
- Crescentina
- Crescentinus
- Crescentius
- Creticus
- Crispianus
- Crispinianus
- Crispinillus
- Crispinus
- Crispus
- Crito
- Crotilo
- Crus
- Cucuphas
- Culleolus
- Cullio
- Cumanus
- Cunctator
- Cunobarrus
- Cupitianus
- Cupitus
- Curianus
- Curio
- Cursor
- Curtianus
- Curvus
- Cyprianus
- Cyricus

== D ==
- Dacianus
- Dacicus
- Dacius
- Dalmaticus
- Dalmatius
- Dama
- Damascius
- Damasippus
- Damasus
- Damianus
- Dannicus
- Dardanius
- Dardanus
- Dativus
- Datus
- Decembris
- Decianus
- Deciminus
- Decimus
- Decmitius
- Decor
- Decoratus
- Demetrianus
- Densus
- Dentatus
- Denter
- Dento
- Desideratus
- Desiderius
- Dexion
- Dexippus
- Dexter
- Dextrianus
- Diadematus
- Diadumenus
- Dianilla
- Didianus
- Didicus
- Didymus
- Dido
- Dignillus
- Dignissimus
- Dignitas
- Dignus
- Diligens
- Dio
- Diocletianus
- Dioscourides
- Disertus
- Dives
- Docilis
- Docilinus
- Docilus
- Dolabella
- Dolens
- Dominicus
- Domitia
- Domitianus
- Domitillus
- Domitius
- Donatianus
- Donatillus
- Donatus
- Donicus
- Dorotheus
- Dorso
- Dorsuo
- Dotalis
- Draco
- Drusillus The feminine "Drusilla" is known, but is the masculine form attested?
- Drusus
- Dubitatius
- Duilianus
- Dulcis
- Dulcitius
- Durio
- Durus
- Duvianus

== E ==
- Eborius
- Eburus
- Eburnus
- Ecdicius
- Eclectus
- Efficax
- Egbuttius
- Egnatianus
- Egnatillus
- Elegans
- Elerius
- Eliphas
- Elpidius
- Elvorix
- Emeritus
- Encratis
- Ennecus
- Ennius
- Ennodius
- Eonus
- Eparchius
- Epidianus
- Epimachus
- Epiphanius
- Epolonius
- Erasinus
- Esdras
- Esquilinus
- Equinus
- Etruscillus
- Etruscus
- Eucherius
- Eudomius
- Eudoxius
- Eugenius
- Eugenus
- Eulogius
- Eumenius
- Eunapius
- Euphemius
- Eurysaces
- Eustachius
- Eustacius
- Eustathius
- Eustochius
- Eutherius
- Evodius
- Excingus
- Exoratus
- Exoriens
- Exsupereus
- Extricatus
- Exuperans
- Exuperantius
- Exuperata
- Exuperatus
- Exupereus
- Exuperius

== F ==
- Faber
- Fabianus
- Fabiolus
- Fabricianus
- Fabullianus
- Fabullus
- Facilis
- Facundinus
- Facundus
- Fadus
- Fagus
- Falco
- Falconillus
- Falx
- Fama
- Familiaris
- Fastidius
- Fastus
- Farus
- Fatalis
- Faustillus
- Faustinianus
- Faustinus
- Faustus
- Faventinus
- Favonianus
- Favor
- Favorinus
- Felicianus
- Felicio
- Felicissimus
- Felicitas
- Felicius
- Felicla
- Felicula
- Felissimus
- Felix
- Ferentinus
- Ferox
- Ferreolus
- Festianus
- Festivus
- Festus
- Fidelis
- Fidenas
- Fides
- Fidus
- Figulus
- Fimbria
- Fimus
- Firmianus
- Firmillus
- Firminianus
- Firminillus
- Firminus
- Firmiolus
- Firmus
- Flaccianus
- Flaccillus
- Flaccinator
- Flaccinus
- Flaccus
- Flamen
- Flaminianus
- Flaminillus
- Flamininus
- Flamma
- Flavianillus
- Flavianus
- Flavillus
- Flavinus
- Flavus
- Florens
- Florentianus
- Florentillus
- Florentinus
- Florentius
- Florianus
- Floridus
- Florillus
- Florinus
- Florus
- Flos
- Fonteianus
- Fontinalis
- Forianus
- Formica
- Fortio
- Fortis
- Fortunata
- Fortunatianus
- Fortunatus
- Fraucus
- Frequens
- Frequentianus
- Frequentillus
- Frequentinus
- Frigidianus
- Frontalis
- Frontillus
- Frontinianus
- Frontinus
- Fronto
- Frontonianus
- Frontonillus
- Fructuosus
- Fructus
- Frugi
- Frugius
- Frumentius
- Fufianus
- Fulgentius
- Fullo
- Fullofaudes
- Fulvianillus
- Fulvianus
- Fulvillus
- Fulvus
- Fundanus
- Furianus
- Fuscianillus
- Fuscianus
- Fuscillus
- Fuscinillus
- Fuscinus
- Fuscus
- Fusus

== G ==
- Gabinianus
- Gabinillus
- Gabinus
- Gaetulicus
- Gaianillus
- Gaianus
- Gala
- Galarius
- Galba
- Galenus
- Galerus
- Gallicanus
- Gallicus
- Gallienus
- Gallio
- Gallus
- Galvisius
- Garilianus
- Garrulus
- Gaudens
- Gaudentianus
- Gaudentius
- Gauolus
- Gavianus
- Gavros
- Gelasius
- Gellianus
- Gemellianus
- Gemellinus
- Gemellus
- Geminianus
- Geminus
- Generidus
- Genesius
- Genialis
- Gennadius
- Gentilis
- Germanicus
- Germanus
- Germinator
- Geta
- Getha
- Glabrio
- Globulus
- Gluvias
- Glycia
- Gogaenus
- Gordianus
- Gordio
- Gorgonius
- Gracchanus
- Gracchus
- Gracilis
- Graecinus
- Gramula
- Granianus
- Granillus
- Gratianus
- Gratidianus
- Gratillus
- Gratinianus
- Gratinus
- Gratus
- Grattianus
- Gregorius
- Grumio
- Gryllus
- Grypus
- Gualterus
- Gurges
- Gutta
- Graecus

== H ==
- Habitus
- Hadrianus
- Hardalio
- Hasta
- Helvianus
- Hemina
- Herculanus
- Herculia
- Herculius
- Herennianus
- Herennius
- Herenus
- Herma
- Hermias
- Hermina
- Hermogenes
- Hesychius
- Hiberus
- Hibrida
- Hilara
- Hilarianus
- Hilarillus
- Hilarinus
- Hilario
- Hilaris
- Hilarius
- Hilarus
- Hipparchus
- Hirpinius
- Hirrus
- Homullus
- Honoratianus
- Honoratus
- Honorinus
- Horatianus
- Horatius
- Hortalus
- Hortensianus
- Hortensis
- Hortensus
- Hostilianus
- Humilus
- Hybrida

== I ==
- Iacomus
- Ianuaria
- Ianuarius
- Iavolenus
- Imbrex
- Imperiosus
- Impetratus
- Indaletius
- Indus
- Infantio
- Ingeniosus
- Ingenuillis
- Ingenuus
- Ingenvinus
- Innocens
- Inregillensis
- Iocundus
- Iovianus
- Iovinianus
- Iovinus
- Iovius
- Irenaeus
- Isatis
- Isauricus
- Isaurus
- Isidorus
- Ismarus
- Italicus
- Iuba
- Iucundianus
- Iucundillus
- Iucundinus
- Iucundus
- Iulianus
- Iulillus
- Iuliolus
- Iulius
- Iulus
- Iuncinus
- Iuncus
- Iunianus
- Iunillus
- Iunior
- Iustianus
- Iustillus
- Iustinianus
- Iustinus
- Iustus
- Iuvenalis
- Iuvenis
- Iuventianus
- Iuventinus
- Iynx

== K ==
- Kario

== L ==
- Labienus
- Labeo
- Laberianus
- Lactantius
- Lactuca
- Lacticinus
- Laeca
- Laelianus
- Laenas
- Laetillus
- Laetinianus
- Laetus
- Laevillus
- Laevinus
- Laevus
- Lamia
- Lanatus
- Lanuccus
- Larcianus
- Lartianus
- Largus
- Lateranus
- Latinus
- Latro
- Laurentinus
- Laurentius
- Laurinus
- Laurus
- Leddicus
- Lentullus
- Lentulus
- Leo
- Leontius
- Lepidianus
- Lepidillus
- Lepidinus
- Lepidus
- Lepontus
- Leporinus
- Lepos
- Libanius
- Liberalis
- Liberius
- Libo
- Licinianus
- Licinus
- Ligur
- Ligus
- Ligustinus
- Limetanus
- Linus
- Litorius
- Littera
- Litumaris
- Livianus
- Livigenus
- Livillus
- Lollianus
- Longillus
- Longinianus
- Longinillus
- Longinus
- Longus
- Lovernianus
- Lovernius
- Lucanus
- Lucianus,
- Lucidus
- Lucifer
- Lucilianus
- Lucillianus
- Lucillus
- Lucinus
- Luciolus
- Lucretianus
- Lucretius
- Lucrio
- Luctacus
- Luculla
- Lucullus
- Lunaris
- Luonercus
- Lupercillus
- Lupercus
- Lupicinus
- Lupinus
- Lupulus
- Lupus
- Lurco
- Lurio
- Luscinus
- Luscus
- Lusianus
- Lustricus
- Lutatianus
- Lycaeus

== M ==
- Maccalus
- Macer
- Macerinus
- Macrinianus
- Macrinillus
- Macrinus
- Macro
- Macrobius
- Mactator
- Maecenus
- Maecianus
- Magnentius
- Magnianus
- Magnillus
- Magnus
- Magunnus
- Maiorianus
- Maior
- Maius
- Malchus
- Malleolus
- Mallianus
- Mallus
- Maltinus
- Maluginensis
- Mamercinus
- Mamercus
- Mamertinus
- Mamilianus
- Mamma
- Mammula
- Mancinus
- Maniacus
- Manilianus
- Manlianus
- Mansuetus
- Marcallas
- Marcella
- Marcellianus
- Marcellinus
- Marcellus
- Marcialis
- Marcianus
- Margarita
- Marianillus
- Marianus
- Marinianus
- Marinus
- Maritialis
- Maritimus
- Marius
- Maro
- Marsallas
- Marsicus
- Marsus
- Marsyas
- Martialis
- Martianus
- Martinianus
- Martinus
- Martius
- Martyrius
- Marullinus
- Marullus
- Masavo
- Masculus
- Materninus
- Maternus
- Matho
- Maturinus
- Maturus
- Mauricius
- Maurinus
- Mauritius
- Maurus
- Maxentius
- Maxima
- Maximianus
- Maximillianus
- Maximillus
- Maximinus
- Maximus
- Medullinus
- Megellus
- Meletius
- Melissus
- Melito
- Melitus
- Mellitus
- Melus
- Meminianus
- Memmianus
- Memor
- Mento
- Mercator
- Mercurialis
- Mercurinus
- Merenda
- Merula
- Messala
- Messalla
- Messalinus
- Messianus
- Messor
- Metellinus
- Metellus
- Metilianus
- Metunus
- Micianus
- Mico
- Milo
- Milonius
- Minervalis
- Minervinus
- Minianus
- Minicianus
- Minucianus
- Moderatillus
- Moderatus
- Modestinus
- Modestus
- Modianus
- Molacus
- Momus
- Montanillus
- Montanus
- Mordanticus
- Mucianus
- Mugillanus
- Munatianus
- Muncius
- Murena
- Mus
- Musa
- Musca
- Musicus
- Mutilus
- Mutto

== N ==
- Nabor
- Naevianus
- Naevolus
- Narcissus
- Narses
- Nasica
- Naso
- Natalianus
- Natalinus
- Natalis
- Natalius
- Natta
- Nepos
- Nepotianus
- Naucratius
- Nazarius
- Nectaridus
- Nelius
- Nemesianus
- Nemnogenus
- Neneus
- Nennius
- Nepos
- Nepotillus
- Neptunalis
- Nero
- Nertomarus
- Nerva
- Nicasius
- Nicetius
- Nigellus
- Niger
- Nigidianus
- Nigrianus
- Nigrinus
- Ninnianus
- Niraemius
- Nobilior
- Noctua
- Nolus
- Nonianus
- Norbanianus
- Noricus
- Noster
- Novanus
- Novation
- Novellianus
- Novellus
- Novianus
- Numerianus
- Numida
- Nummus
- Numonis

== O ==
- Obsequens
- Oceanus
- Ocella
- Octavianus
- Octavillus
- Octobrianus
- Oculatus
- Ofella
- Olennius
- Olympicus
- Opilio
- Opimianus
- Opis
- Oppianicus
- Oppianus
- Optatillus
- Optatio
- Optatus
- Orbiotalus
- Ordius
- Orestes
- Orestillus
- Orientalis
- Orientius
- Orissus
- Orontius
- Ostorianus
- Otacilianus
- Otho
- Ovidus

== P ==
- Pacatianus
- Pacatus
- Pachomius
- Pacilus
- Pacuvianus
- Paenula
- Paetillus
- Paetinus
- Paetus
- Palicanus
- Palma
- Pammachius
- Pamphilius
- Panaetius
- Pansa
- Pantensus
- Pantera
- Panthera
- Papianus
- Papinianus
- Papirianus
- Papus
- Paratus
- Pardus
- Parmensis
- Parnesius
- Pasicles
- Pastor
- Paterculus
- Paternianus
- Paternus
- Patiens
- Patricius
- Paulinus
- Paullinus
- Paullus/Paulus
- Pavo
- Pelagius
- Pelecrio
- Pennus
- Pera
- Peregrinus
- Perennis
- Perpetuus
- Persicus
- Pertacus
- Pertinax
- Pervincianus
- Pervincus
- Petasius
- Peticus
- Petilianus
- Petillianus
- Petro
- Petronax
- Petronianus
- Petronillus
- Petronius
- Petrus
- Philippus
- Philo
- Philopappus
- Philus
- Photius
- Picens (associated with gens Herennia)
- Pictor
- Pilatus
- Pilus
- Pinarianus
- Pinnus
- Piso
- Pitio
- Pius
- Placidianus
- Placidinus
- Placidus
- Plancianus
- Plancinus
- Plancus
- Planta
- Plautianus
- Plautillus
- Plautinus
- Plautis
- Plautus
- Pleminianus
- Plinianus
- Plotianus
- Plotillus
- Plotinus
- Plotus
- Polemo
- Pollianus
- Pollienus
- Pollio
- Pollus/Polus
- Polybius
- Pompeianus
- Pompilianus
- Pompolussa
- Pomponianus
- Pomponillus
- Pontianus
- Ponticillus
- Ponticus
- Poplicola
- Porcellus
- Porcianus
- Porcina
- Porcus
- Porphyrius
- Posca
- Posidonius
- Postumianus
- Postuminus
- Postumus
- Potens
- Potentinus
- Potestas
- Potitianus
- Potitus
- Praenestinus
- Praesens
- Praetextatus
- Praetextus
- Prilidianus
- Prima
- Primanus
- Primianus
- Primigena
- Primigenius
- Primillus
- Priminia
- Primio
- Primitivus
- Primulus
- Primus
- Prisca
- Priscianus
- Priscillianus
- Priscillus
- Priscinus
- Priscus
- Privatus
- Privernas
- Probatus
- Probianus
- Probillus
- Probinus
- Probus
- Processus
- Proceus
- Procla
- Proclus
- Procula
- Proculianus
- Proculinus
- Proculus
- Procus
- Procyon
- Promptus
- Prontinus
- Profuturus
- Propertius
- Propinquus
- Prosperus
- Protacius
- Proteus
- Protus
- Provincialis
- Proximillus
- Proximus
- Prudens
- Prudentillus
- Publianus
- Publicianus
- Publicola
- Publicus
- Publilianus
- Pudens
- Pudentianus
- Pudentillus
- Pudentius
- Pulcher
- Pulcherius
- Pulex
- Pullus
- Pulvillus
- Pupianus
- Pupus
- Purpureo
- Purpurio
- Pusinnus
- Pusio
- Pustula

== Q ==
- Quadratillus
- Quadratus
- Quartillus
- Quartinus
- Quartio
- Quarto
- Quartus
- Quietus
- Quintianus
- Quintilianus
- Quintillanius
- Quintillus
- Quintinus
- Quintio
- Quintus
- Quiricus
- Quirinalis
- Quirinus

== R ==
- Rabirianus
- Raeticus
- Ramio
- Ravilla
- Rebilus
- Reburrinus
- Reburrus
- Receptus
- Rectus
- Regillensis
- Regillianus
- Regillus
- Reginus
- Regulianus
- Regulus
- Remigius
- Remus
- Renatus
- Repentinus
- Respectillus
- Respectus
- Restitutus
- Rex
- Rhesus
- Ripanus
- Robustus
- Rogatianus
- Rogatillus
- Rogatus
- Rogelius
- Romanillus
- Romanus
- Romulianus
- Romulus
- Roscianus
- Rufianus
- Rufillus or Rufilla
- Rufinianus
- Rufinillus
- Rufinus or Rufina
- Rufio
- Rufrianus
- Rufus
- Ruga
- Rullianus
- Rullus
- Ruricius
- Rusca
- Ruso
- Russus
- Rusticus
- Rutilianus
- Rutilus

== S ==
- Sabaco
- Sabellius
- Sabina
- Sabinianus
- Sabinillus
- Sabinus
- Sabinio
- Saccus
- Sacerdos
- Saeclus
- Saenus
- Saenarius
- Salinator
- Sallustianus
- Salonianus
- Saloninus
- Salvia
- Salvianus
- Salvillus
- Salvinus
- Sanctinus
- Sanctus
- Sandilianus
- Sanga
- Sapiens
- Sarimarcus
- Saserna
- Satullus
- Saturnalis
- Saturnina
- Saturninus
- Saunio
- Saverrio
- Saxo
- Scaeva
- Scaevola
- Scapula
- Scaro
- Scarpus
- Scato
- Scaurianus
- Scaurus
- Schlerus
- Scipio
- Scribonianus
- Scrofa
- Sebastianus
- Secunda
- Secundianus
- Secundillus
- Secundinus
- Secundio
- Secundus
- Securus
- Sedatus
- Sedulus
- Segestes
- Seianus
- Sempronianus
- Senator
- Seneca
- Senecianus
- Senecio
- Senilianus
- Senilis
- Senna
- Senopianus
- Seppius
- Septimianus
- Septimillus
- Septimus
- Serapio
- Serapion
- Serenus
- Sergianus
- Sergillus
- Seronatus
- Serranus
- Sertorianus
- Servanus
- Servatius
- Servianus
- Servilianus
- Sestianus
- Sestinus
- Severa
- Severlinus
- Severianus
- Severillus
- Severinus
- Severus
- Seuso
- Sextianus
- Sextilianus
- Sextillianus
- Sextillus
- Sextinus
- Sextus
- Siculus
- Sidonius
- Sigilis
- Silanus
- Silianus
- Silo
- Silus
- Silvanus
- Silvester
- Silvianus
- Silvillus
- Silvinus
- Silvia
- Silvius
- Similis
- Simo
- Simplex
- Simplicianus
- Simplicius
- Siricius
- Siricus
- Sisenna
- Sisinnius
- Sita
- Sitio
- Solinus
- Sollemnis
- Solon
- Solus
- Sophus
- Soranus
- Sorex
- Sorio
- Sospes
- Sotericus
- Sparsus
- Spartacus
- Spectatillus
- Spectatus
- Spendius
- Speratus
- Spinther
- Spurinna
- Squillus
- Stabilio
- Statius
- Stellio
- Stilo
- Stichus
- Stolo
- Strabo
- Structus
- Suavis
- Subulo
- Suburanus
- Successianus
- Successus
- Sudrenus
- Sulca
- Sulinus
- Sulla
- Sulpicianus
- Super
- Superbus
- Superianus
- Superstes
- Superus
- Sura
- Surdus
- Surinus
- Surius
- Surus
- Symmachus
- Symphorianus
- Synistor
- Synnodus
- Syriacus

== T ==
- Tacitianus
- Tacitus
- Taenaris
- Tancinus
- Tanicus
- Tantalus
- Tappo
- Tarcisius
- Tarquinianus
- Tatianus
- Taurillus
- Taurinus
- Taurus
- Tegula
- Telesinus
- Tenax
- Terentianus
- Terentillus
- Tertia
- Tertianus
- Tertinus
- Tertiolus
- Tertius
- Tertulla
- Tertullianus
- Tertullus
- Tetricus
- Tettianus
- Thrasea
- Thurinus
- Tiberianus
- Tiberillus
- Tiberinus
- Tibullus
- Tiburs
- Tigris
- Tiro
- Titianus
- Titillus
- Titinianus
- Titiolus
- Titulla
- Togidubnus
- Tlaboni
- Torquatus
- Toxotius
- Traianus
- Trailus
- Tranio
- Tranquillinus
- Tranquillus
- Trebellianus
- Trebonianus
- Tremerus
- Tremorinus
- Tremulus
- Trenico
- Triarius
- Tricipitinus
- Trifer
- Trifolio
- Trigeminus
- Trimalchio
- Trinus
- Trio
- Tritus
- Trogus
- Trypho
- Tubero
- Tubertus
- Tubulus
- Tuccianus
- Tuditanus
- Tullianus
- Turbo
- Turibius
- Turpilianus
- Turpilinus
- Turrinus
- Tuscillus
- Tuscus
- Tusculus
- Tuticanus
- Tutor

== U ==
- Ulpianus
- Ulpiolus
- Umbrianus
- Umbrinus
- Ummidianus
- Urbanillus
- Urbanus
- Urbicus
- Urgulanianus
- Urgulanillus
- Ursa
- Ursianus
- Ursinianus
- Ursillus
- Ursinus
- Ursulus
- Ursus
- Uticensis

== V ==
- Vala
- Vallaunius
- Valens
- Valentianus
- Valentillus
- Valentinian
- Valentinus
- Valerianus
- Valerillus
- Valgus (associated with Gens Quinctia)
- Varialus
- Varianus
- Varro
- Varus
- Vatia
- Vaticanus
- Vatinianus
- Vatio
- Vedrix, Velikov
- Vegetus
- Vejento
- Velocianus
- Velox
- Venantianus
- Venantius
- Venator
- Venerius
- Venter
- Ventrio
- Venustinus
- Venustus
- Verax
- Verecundus
- Vergilianus
- Verginianus
- Verillio
- Verinus
- Verissimus
- Veritas
- Verna
- Vernio
- Verres
- Verrucosus
- Veruicius
- Verullus
- Verus
- Vespa
- Vespasianus
- Vespillo
- Vestinus
- Vetranio
- Vettianus
- Vettillus
- Vettonianus
- Veturianus
- Vetus
- Viator
- Vibennis
- Vibianus
- Vibidianus
- Vibillus
- Vibulanus
- Vicanus
- Victor
- Victoria
- Victorianus
- Victoricus
- Victorinus
- Victorius
- Victricius
- Vigilantius
- Vincentius
- Vindacus
- Vindex
- Vindicianus
- Vinicianus
- Vipsanianus
- Virgilianus
- Virgula
- Virginianus
- Viridio
- Virilio
- Virilis
- Viscellinus
- Vitalianus
- Vitalinus
- Vitalio
- Vitalis
- Vitellianus
- Vitulus
- Vitus
- Vivianus
- Vocula
- Volumnianus
- Volusianus
- Volusus
- Vopiscus
- Voluptas
- Vulso

== Z ==
- Zeno
- Zenodotus
- Zethos
- Zosimus
- Zoticus

== See also ==
- Roman Empire
- Roman naming conventions
- Naming conventions for women in ancient Rome
- Roman Republic
- List of Roman imperial victory titles
- List of Roman nomina
- List of Roman praenomina
- Roman tribe
