= Gallicanus =

Gallicanus may refer to:

- Gaius Cornelius Gallicanus, Roman consul in 84 AD
- Ovinius Gallicanus, Roman consul in 317 AD
- Flavius Gallicanus, Roman consul in 330 AD
- Saint Gallicanus (fl. 363 AD), legendary saint, perhaps a composite of the above
- Gallicanus I, bishop of Embrun (fl. 524–29 AD)
- Gallicanus II, bishop of Embrun (fl. 541–49 AD)
