= Saint Lupercus =

Saint Lupercus may refer to one of two Roman Catholic Saints:

- Luperculus, also known as Lupercus, Roman Catholic saint
- Marcellus of Tangier#Claudius, Lupercus, Victorius, another Roman Catholic saint

== See also ==
- Lupercus
