= San Nazario =

San Nazario may refer to:

- San Nazario, Veneto
- The Italian form of Nazarius
- The church of San Nazaro in Brolo
