= Bellator =

Bellator may refer to:

== Taxonomy ==
- Bellator (fish), a fish genus in the family Triglidae (sea robins)
  - Bellator egretta, the streamer searobin
  - Bellator militaris, the horned searobin
- Anopheles bellator, a mosquito species in the genus Anopheles
- Blennidus bellator, a species of ground beetle in the subfamily Pterostichinae
- Clidicus bellator, an insect species in the genus Clidicus
- Eleutherodactylus bellator, a frog species in the genus Eleutherodactylus
- Etheostoma bellator, the warrior darter, a freshwater fish species in the genus Etheostoma
- Pristimantis bellator, a frog species in the genus Pristimantis

== Other uses ==
- Bellator MMA, a mixed martial arts promotion based in the United States
- Basilica of Bellator, found at the Archaeological site of Sbeitla

== See also ==
- List of Roman cognomina
