= Aemilianus (disambiguation) =

Aemilianus was Roman emperor for three months in 253.

Aemilianus or Aemilian may also refer to:

== Romans ==
- Scipio Aemilianus (185 BC–129 BC), son of Lucius Aemilius Paulus Macedonicus, was adopted by Publius Cornelius Scipio, the son of Scipio Africanus
- Lucius Mussius Aemilianus, one of the Thirty Tyrants; supported the rebellion of the Macriani against Gallienus (260-261 AD), and afterwards probably proclaimed himself emperor

== Saints ==
- Emilianus of Trevi (died 302/304), bishop and martyr, later Saint
- Aemilianus (African martyr) (died 484), victim of Vandal persecution
- Aemilian of Cogolla (472–573), Spanish saint
- Émilien of Nantes (Latin: Aemilianus) (died c. 725), bishop of Nantes who fought the Saracens

== See also ==
- Gerolamo Emiliani (1486–1537), also known as Jerome Aemilian, Italian humanitarian and Roman Catholic saint
