= Manteomasiphya =

Scientific classification
- Kingdom: Animalia
- Phylum: Arthropoda
- Class: Insecta
- Order: Diptera
- Family: Tachinidae
- Subfamily: Exoristinae
- Tribe: Masiphyini
- Genus: Manteomasiphya; Guimarães, 1966

Type species
- Manteomasiphya brasiliensis Guimarães, 1966

Genus of flies

Manteomasiphya is a genus of flies in the family Tachinidae.

== Species ==
- Manteomasiphya brasiliensis Guimarães, 1966

== Distribution ==
Brazil.
