= Liberalis =

Liberalis is a Roman surname. Notable people with the surname include:

- Flavius Liberalis (fl. early 1st century CE), Roman politician
- Gaius Salvius Liberalis (history) (fl. 80s CE), Roman religious leader & government administrator
- Liberalis (died c. 121), Roman Balkan religious leader, a.k.a. Eleutherius of Eleutherius and Antia
- Antoninus Liberalis (fl. early 1st millennium), Greek scholar
- Liberalis of Treviso (died 400), Roman religious leader
- Saint Liberalis of Embrun (died 940), French religious leader
- Gaius Salvius Liberalis (fiction), fictional character

== See also ==
- Liberius (disambiguation)
- Liberalis of free spirit, generous, ‘freedom’
