= Paraphasiopsis =

Scientific classification
- Kingdom: Animalia
- Phylum: Arthropoda
- Class: Insecta
- Order: Diptera
- Family: Tachinidae
- Subfamily: Exoristinae
- Tribe: Masiphyini
- Genus: Paraphasiopsis; Townsend, 1917

Type species
- Paraphasiopsis mellicornis Townsend, 1917

Genus of flies

Paraphasiopsis is a genus of flies in the family Tachinidae.

== Species ==
- Paraphasiopsis mellicornis Townsend, 1917
- Paraphasiopsis trinitatis Thompson, 1963
