= Eliphaz (given name) =

Eliphaz is one of Esau's sons in the Bible.

Eliphaz or Eliphas may also refer to:

- Eliphaz (Job), another person in the Bible
- Eliphaz Dow (1705–1755), first male executed in New Hampshire
- Eliphaz Fay (1797–1854), fourth president of Waterville College (now called Colby College)
- Éliphas Lévi (1810-1875), French occultist born Alphonse Louis Constant
- Eliphaz Maari (born 1954), Anglican bishop who served in Ugand
- Eliphas Shivute (born 1974), Namibian retired footballer

== See also ==
- Eliphas Buffett House, Cold Spring Harbor, New York, on the National Register of Historic Places
- Elifaz, Israel, a kibbutz
