= Oromasiphya =

Scientific classification
- Kingdom: Animalia
- Phylum: Arthropoda
- Class: Insecta
- Order: Diptera
- Family: Tachinidae
- Subfamily: Exoristinae
- Tribe: Masiphyini
- Genus: Oromasiphya; Townsend, 1927

Type species
- Oromasiphya ornata Townsend, 1927

Genus of flies

Oromasiphya is a genus of flies in the family Tachinidae.

== Species ==
- Oromasiphya ornata Townsend, 1927
- Oromasiphya urbanae Guimarães, 1966
