= Probianus =

Probianus may refer to:

- Petronius Probianus (fl. 315–331 AD), a Roman consul and praefectus urbi
- Rufius Probianus (fl. 400), a vicarius
- Caelius Aconius Probianus (fl. 461–471), a praetorian prefect and consul
