= Fronto =

Fronto (Latin for a person with a large forehead) may refer to:

- Various Romans with the cognomen Fronto:
  - Fronto of Emesa (3rd century), a famous rhetorician and uncle of Cassius Longinus
  - Gaius Caristanius Fronto (1st century), a Roman soldier and eques whom Vespasian promoted to the Roman Senate
  - Marcus Claudius Fronto (AD 170), a Roman senator and Consul, and a general in the Imperial Roman army
  - Marcus Cornelius Fronto (c. 100 – late 160s), a Roman grammarian and rhetorician
- Fronto, a genus of beetles in the tribe Hyperini
- Valencian frontó, a modified version of the Basque Pelota game
