= Micromasiphya =

Scientific classification
- Kingdom: Animalia
- Phylum: Arthropoda
- Class: Insecta
- Order: Diptera
- Family: Tachinidae
- Subfamily: Exoristinae
- Tribe: Masiphyini
- Genus: Micromasiphya; Townsend, 1934

Type species
- Micromasiphya curta Townsend, 1934

Genus of flies

Micromasiphya is a genus of flies in the family Tachinidae.

== Species ==
- Micromasiphya curta Townsend, 1934

== Distribution ==
Brazil.
