= Saint Ferreolus =

Saint Ferreolus may refer to:

- Ferreolus of Besançon (died 212), priest and martyr (with St. Ferrutio), feast day June 16
- Ferréol of Uzès (530–581), Catholic saint and bishop, feast day January 4
- Ferréol of Grenoble (died 670), or Ferjus, Bishop of Grenoble

== See also ==
- Ferreolus (disambiguation)
