= Certus =

Certus may refer to:

- Certus Gearless Company, a British automotive company
- Iridium Certus, a globally available satellite broadband
