= Masiphya =

Scientific classification
- Kingdom: Animalia
- Phylum: Arthropoda
- Class: Insecta
- Order: Diptera
- Family: Tachinidae
- Subfamily: Exoristinae
- Tribe: Masiphyini
- Genus: Masiphya; Brauer & von Berganstamm, 1891

Type species
- Masiphya brasiliana Brauer & von Berganstamm, 1891

Synonyms
- Ignotomyia Reinhard, 1961; Phasiopsis Townsend, 1912; Promasiphya Townsend, 1927

Genus of flies

Masiphya is a genus of flies in the family Tachinidae.

== Species ==
- Masiphya aurea (Thompson, 1963)
- Masiphya biseriata (Wulp, 1890)
- Masiphya brasiliana Brauer & von Berganstamm, 1891
- Masiphya confusa Aldrich, 1925
- Masiphya cunina (Reinhard, 1961)
- Masiphya floridana (Townsend, 1912)
- Masiphya manteophaga (Guimarães, 1966)
- Masiphya ruficauda (Wulp, 1890)
- Masiphya subtilipalpis (Wulp, 1890)
- Masiphya triangularis (Thompson, 1963)
