= Masiphyoidea =

Scientific classification
- Kingdom: Animalia
- Phylum: Arthropoda
- Class: Insecta
- Order: Diptera
- Family: Tachinidae
- Subfamily: Exoristinae
- Tribe: Masiphyini
- Genus: Masiphyoidea; Thompson, 1963

Type species
- Masiphyoidea chaetosa Thompson, 1963

Synonyms
- Masphyoidea Thompson, 1963; Masyphoidea Edwards & Vevers, 1975

Genus of flies

Masiphyoidea is a genus of flies in the family Tachinidae.

== Species ==
- Masiphyoidea chaetosa Thompson, 1963

== Distribution ==
Trinidad and Tobago, Brazil.
