= Cico =

Cico may refer to:

== People with the nickname ==
- Ciço (Jefferson Rodrigues de Brito, born 1981), Brazilian futsal player
- Cico Harahap (Ezzaq Farrouq Harahap Jamaludin, born 1978), Malay-Indonesian actor
- Cico P (Christopher Simms Jr, born 1998), American singer and songwriter
- Tony Cicco (born 1949), Italian drummer and singer-songwriter
- Zlatko Kranjčar (1956–2021), Croatian footballer
- Yamamoto Chieko, of Bennie K, an urban contemporary female duo formed in 1999

== People with the name ==
- Cico of Ternate, the first king of Ternate in Maluku Islands, Indonesia, c. 1257–1277
- Marie Cico (1843–1875), French singer of opéra-comique and operetta

== Other uses ==
- Combat information center officer, a US naval flight officer role
- Chongqing International Construction Corporation
