= Censor =

Censor may refer to:

== Common meanings ==
- Censoring (statistics), the situation when the value of an observation is only partially known
- Censorship, the control of speech and other forms of human expression

== Arts, entertainment, and media ==
- Censor (2001 film), a drama film written and directed by Dev Anand
- Censor (2021 film), a horror film directed by Prano Bailey-Bond
- "Censor" (song), a single released in 1988 by the band Skinny Puppy, renamed from its original title, "Dogshit"
- Censor.net, a Ukrainian news website

== People with the name ==
- Cato the Elder, also known as Cato the Censor (Marcus Porcius Cato, 234–149 BC), a Roman statesman
- Yair Censor (born 1943), Israeli mathematician

== Titles and roles ==
- Censor (Christ Church, Oxford), a student of Christ Church, Oxford undertaking disciplinary duties assigned to deans of other colleges
- Censor (RCP), a role established to maintain the standards of physicians at the Royal College of Physicians
- Censor, the title of the head of the former Fitzwilliam House; see List of Masters of Fitzwilliam College, Cambridge
- Censor of St Cuthbert's Society, employed by University of Durham to oversee Society members
- Censor Librorum, an expert called on to advise the bishop of a diocese whether or not to grant an imprimatur
- Chief Censor of New Zealand, the head of the government's Office of Film and Literature Classification
- Roman censor, a magistrate for maintaining the census, supervising public morality, etc.

== Other uses ==
- Imperial censorate, a high-level supervisory agency in ancient China, whose duties involved criticizing other officials

== See also ==
- Censer, a small metal or stone dish used for burning incense
- Censure, a formal reprimand
- Census
- Senser
- Sensor, a device or organ that detects or senses a signal or its environment
