= Tertius =

Tertius may refer to:

== People ==
- Tertius of Iconium, first century Christian martyr, saint and bishop
- Tertius, fifth century Christian martyr and saint (see Denise, Dativa, Leontia, Tertius, Emilianus, Boniface, Majoricus, and Servus)
- Tertius Bosch (1966–2000), South African cricketer
- Tertius Chandler (1915–2000) American historian and author
- Tertius Delport, South African politician
- Tertius Losper (born 1985), Namibian rugby union fullback
- T. Tertius Noble (1867–1953), English-born organist and composer
- Tertius Rebelo (1915–1976), Brazilian politician
- Tertius Zongo (born 1957), former Prime Minister of Burkina Faso

== Other uses ==
- Tertius (law), a term in contract law referring to an interested third party
- Tertius, the underworld of Pluto (mythology)
- Tertius Lydgate, a main character in George Eliot's novel Middlemarch
- Tertius, a planet in Robert A . Heinlein's science fiction novel Time Enough for Love and subsequent books featuring Lazarus Long
- Tertius (sandbank), a German sandbank in Meldorf Bay

== See also ==
- Alexander Monro (tertius), named "Tertius" to distinguish him from his grandfather and father
- Tertia (disambiguation), the feminine form of Tertius
