= Belvosiella =

Scientific classification
- Kingdom: Animalia
- Phylum: Arthropoda
- Class: Insecta
- Order: Diptera
- Family: Tachinidae
- Subfamily: Exoristinae
- Tribe: Masiphyini
- Genus: Belvosiella; Curran, 1934

Type species
- Belvosiella funditor Curran, 1934

Genus of flies

Belvosiella is a genus of flies in the family Tachinidae.

== Species ==
- Belvosiella funditor Curran, 1934

== Distribution ==
Guyana.
