= Ferreolus =

Ferreolus may refer to:

- Tonantius Ferreolus (disambiguation), several meanings
- Ferréol of Grenoble, Ferjus of Grenoble, Catholic saint
- Ferréol of Uzès, Catholic saint
- Ferreolus and Ferrutio, martyrs and saints

See also

- Saint Ferreolus (disambiguation)
