= Mystacomyoidea =

Scientific classification
- Kingdom: Animalia
- Phylum: Arthropoda
- Class: Insecta
- Order: Diptera
- Family: Tachinidae
- Subfamily: Exoristinae
- Tribe: Masiphyini
- Genus: Mystacomyoidea; Thompson, 1963

Type species
- Mystacomyoidea mirabilis Thompson, 1963

Genus of flies

Mystacomyoidea is a genus of flies in the family Tachinidae.

== Species ==
- Mystacomyoidea mirabilis Thompson, 1963
- Mystacomyoidea spinosa Guimarães, 1966
