= Barbas (surname) =

Barbas is a Spanish surname. Notable people with the surname include:

- Carlos F. Barbas III (1964–2014), American chemist
- Coral Barbas, Spanish scientist
- Konstantinos Barbas (born 1983), Greek footballer
- Yoann Barbas (born 1988), French cyclist
