= Hilarianus =

Hilarianus or Hilarian may refer to:

== People ==
- Publius Aelius Hilarianus (2nd century), Roman politician, probably the governor in the Passion of Saints Perpetua and Felicity
- Furius Hilarianus (2nd century), Roman military commander
- Mecilius Hilarianus (fl. 316–354), prefect of Rome and praetorian prefect of Italy
- Decimus Hilarianus Hilarius (fl. 377–396), prefect of Rome and praetorian prefect of Italy
- Decimius Hilarianus Hesperius (4th century), Roman politician
- Caelius Hilarianus (fl. 377), Roman senator and priest
- Hilarianus (magister officiorum) (fl. 470)
- Quintus Julius Hilarianus (fl. 397), Roman historian and millenarian writer
- Hilarian of Espalion (d. 793), Catholic priest purportedly martyred by the Saracens

== Other ==
- Hilarianus (genus), genus of insects

== See also ==
- Hilarion (name)
- Hilarinus
- Hilarius
