= Masiphyini =

Scientific classification
- Kingdom: Animalia
- Phylum: Arthropoda
- Class: Insecta
- Order: Diptera
- Family: Tachinidae
- Subfamily: Exoristinae
- Tribe: Masiphyini; Townsend, 1936

Tribe of flies

Masiphyini is a tribe of flies in the family Tachinidae.

== Genera ==
- Alsopsyche Brauer & von Bergenstamm, 1891
- Belvosiella Curran, 1934
- Manteomasiphya Guimarães, 1966
- Masiphya Brauer & von Bergenstamm, 1891
- Masiphyoidea Thompson, 1963
- Micromasiphya Townsend, 1934
- Mystacomyia Giglio-Tos, 1893
- Mystacomyoidea Thompson, 1963
- Neomasiphya Guimarães, 1966
- Oromasiphya Townsend, 1927
- Paraphasiopsis Townsend, 1917
- Prophasiopsis Townsend, 1927
- Pseudomasiphya Thompson, 1963
- Thelairophasia Townsend, 1919
