= Barba =

Barba (which means "beard" in Spanish, Portuguese and Italian) is a surname. Notable people with the surname include:

== People ==
- Antonella Barba (born 1986), U.S. singer and contestant on American Idol
- Angelo Barba (born 1958), Filipino politician
- Ben Barba (born 1989), Australian rugby footballer
- Eric Barba, special effects artist
- Eugenio Barba (born 1936), Italian author and director
- Federico Barba (born 1993), Italian footballer
- Fidel LaBarba (1905–1981), U.S. boxer and sportswriter
- Javier Barba, lead guitar of Mexican rock band Los Depas
- Juan Barbas (born 1959), Argentine footballer
- Paul Barbă Neagră (1929–2009), Romanian film director
- Porfirio Barba-Jacob, pseudonym of Miguel Ángel Osorio Benítez, Colombian poet
- Victoria Barbă (1926–2020), Moldovan animated film director
- Barba (footballer) (born 1999), full name João Pedro de Giuli, Brazilian footballer

=== Fictional characters ===
- Rafael Barba, (Raúl Esparza) appearing on Law & Order: Special Victims Unit
- Barbapapa, the title character, and name of the "species" of said character, of a series of children's books

== See also ==
- The Barba River, a tributary of the Vologne in the French Vosges
- Barba as the Latin root of the word "beard"
- Barbas, in demonology
- Barbas (Charmed), a fictional character
- Barbas (surname)
- Barba is the last palace dungeon of the sixth dungeon in Zelda II: The Adventure of Link. He is a serpent. When Nintendo released Zelda II in Europe and America, they called the palace boss Barba, but this has since been retconned as Volvagia, which is his original name in the Japanese version of Zelda II.
- The sixth Colossus in the 2005 action-adventure video game Shadow of the Colossus
