= Aemilianus (African martyr) =

5th-century Christian martyr and saint

Saint Aemilianus Saint Aemilius
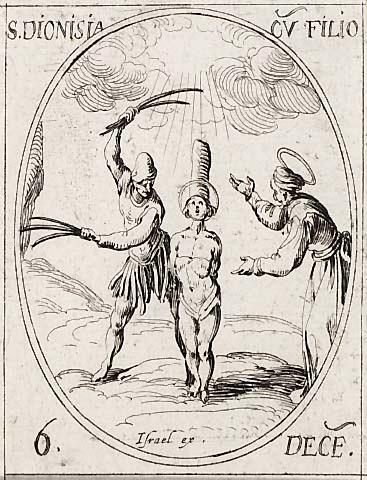
- A depiction of saints Dionysia and Majoricus, who were also martyred in the Vandal kingdom at this time
- Born: c. 5th century
- Died: 484
- Venerated in: Roman Catholic Church, Eastern Orthodox Church
- Canonized: Pre-Congregation
- Feast: 6 December (Catholicism); 7 December (Orthodoxy)

Saint Aemilianus (or Aemilius) lived in the 5th century AD, and is known as a physician, confessor, and martyr. In the reign of the Arian Vandal King Huneric, he became emmired in the Arian persecution in Africa. When he resisted conversion to Arianism, he was put to death by being flayed alive.

Aemilianus' feast day is celebrated on December 6 in Roman Catholicism, and on December 7 in Eastern Orthodoxy.
