= Prophasiopsis =

Scientific classification
- Kingdom: Animalia
- Phylum: Arthropoda
- Class: Insecta
- Order: Diptera
- Family: Tachinidae
- Subfamily: Exoristinae
- Tribe: Masiphyini
- Genus: Prophasiopsis; Townsend, 1927

Type species
- Prophasiopsis polita Townsend, 1927

Genus of flies

Prophasiopsis is a genus of flies in the family Tachinidae.

== Species ==
- Prophasiopsis lopesi Guimarães, 1966
- Prophasiopsis polita Townsend, 1927
