= Claudianus =

Claudianus may refer to:

== People ==
- Marcus Livius Drusus Claudianus (fl. 1st century BC), a senator in Roman Republic and father of Livia, Roman empress and Augustus' third wife
- Claudianus (1st century), an Egyptian strategos of the nome, to whom was addressed in Papyrus Oxyrhynchus 51 (written in 173)
- Claudius Claudianus (c. 370 – c. 404), an Egypto-Roman poet born in Alexandria
- Claudianus Ecdidius Mamertus (died c. 473), a Gallo-Roman theologian and a brother of Saint Mamertus
- Osbern Pinnock of Gloucester or Claudianus Osbernus Pinnuc (1123–1200), an English Benedictine monk of St Peter's Abbey, Gloucester
- Claudianus Ostern, the pen name of the Slovak preacher Edmund Pascha (1714–1772)

== Locations ==
- Mons Claudianus, a Roman quarry in the eastern desert of Egypt

== Biology ==
- Hesperia claudianus (Latreille, [1824]), a synonym of Carystus phorcus, a butterfly species
  - Carystus phorcus claudianus (Latreille, [1824]), a subspecies of Carystus phorcus
- Harma claudianus (Druce, 1874), a synonym of Euryphura chalcis, a butterfly species
