= Alsopsyche =

Scientific classification
- Domain: Eukaryota
- Kingdom: Animalia
- Phylum: Arthropoda
- Class: Insecta
- Order: Diptera
- Family: Tachinidae
- Subfamily: Exoristinae
- Tribe: Masiphyini
- Genus: Alsopsyche; Brauer & von Berganstamm, 1891

Type species
- Aneogmena nemoralis Brauer & von Berganstamm, 1891

Genus of flies

Alsopsyche is a genus of flies in the family Tachinidae.

== Species ==
- Aneogmena nemoralis Brauer & von Berganstamm, 1891

== Distribution ==
Venezuela.
