= Gallicanus II =

Gallicanus II was the ninth bishop of Embrun. He assisted at the Fourth Council of Orléans in 541 and was represented by a certain Probus at the fifth of Orléans. He is said to have consecrated a church dedicated to the Spanish martyrs Vincent, Orontius and Victor, which was built at Embrun by the previous bishop, Palladius. It is possible, however, that Palladius never existed—he is unknown except from some hagiographical documents of little value—and that Gallicanus II is the same person as Gallicanus I and governed the diocese from 518 until 549, and perhaps as late as 554.

== Sources ==
- Halfond, Gregory I. The Archaeology of Frankish Church Councils, AD 511–768. Leiden: Brill, 2010.
