= Pupus =

Ancient Roman name

Pupus was an ancient Roman name, meaning "boy" (and its feminine form Pupa meaning "girl"), it seems to have been used mainly as a nickname for little children, but there are cases of it being used as proper cognomen for adults and even as a praenomen.

== As a cognomen ==
Pupus is attested as a cognomen during the imperial period, and likely implied the person was from the western part of the empire.

== As pseudopraenomen or praenomen ==
In the past some historians such as Theodor Mommsen believed that all male infants who died before their naming day were given the name "Pupus" in place of an actual praenomen on funeral inscriptions, but it has later been shown that Pupus was used at times as an actual praenomen for males who survived to adulthood. When used similar to a paenomen the name had the shortened form "Pup." (PVP.), which has been attested from inscriptions honoring Agrippa Postumus as a young boy.

In its feminine form the name has been attested as a praenomen for a first century woman named Pupa Cassia, and possibly a later imperial woman named Pupa Valeria Maximina.

== See also ==
- List of Roman cognomina
