= Calvinus =

Calvinus may refer to:

- Calvinus as the Latin form of John Calvin
- Gnaeus Domitius Calvinus
- Justus Baronius Calvinus
- Titus Veturius Calvinus
- The Swiss craft beer, see Calvinus_(beer)
