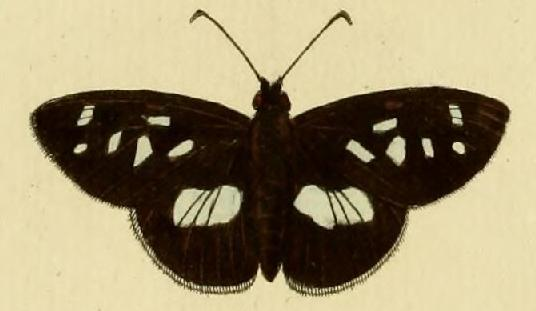
- Carystus phorcus

Scientific classification
- Kingdom: Animalia
- Phylum: Arthropoda
- Class: Insecta
- Order: Lepidoptera
- Family: Hesperiidae
- Subtribe: Carystina
- Genus: Carystus; Hübner, 1819

= Carystus (skipper) =

Genus of butterflies

Carystus is a genus of skipper butterflies in the family Hesperiidae.

== Species ==
The genus Carystus consists of the following species:

- Carystus cynaxa Hewitson, 1867
- Carystus diores (Plötz, 1882)
- Carystus elana (Plötz, 1882)
- Carystus elvira (Plötz, 1882)
- Carystus hocus Evans, 1955
- Carystus hylaspes (Stoll, [1781])
- Carystus jolus (Stoll, [1782])
- Carystus junior Evans, 1955
- Carystus lota Hewitson, 1877
- Carystus metella (Plötz, 1882)
- Carystus moeros (Möschler, 1877)
- Carystus periphas Mabille, 1891
- Carystus phorcus (Cramer, 1777)
- Carystus ploetzi Mielke & Casagrande, 2002
- Carystus superbiens Mabille, 1891

=== Former species ===
- Carystus argus Möschler, 1879 - synonymized with Carystus lota Hewitson, 1877
- Carystus dyscritus Mabille, 1891 - synonymized with Cobalopsis nero (Herrich-Schäffer, 1869)
- Carystus epidius Mabille, 1891 - transferred to Pheraeus epidius (Mabille, 1891)
- Carystus gemmatus Butler, 1872 - transferred to Dion gemmatus (Butler, 1872)
- Carystus jeconia Butler, 1870 - transferred to Falga jeconia (Butler, 1870)
- Carystus klugi Bell, 1941 - transferred to Mielkeus klugi (Bell, 1941)
- Carystus lucia Capronnier, 1874 - transferred to Lucida lucia (Capronnier, 1874)
- Carystus odilia Burmeister, 1878 - synonymized with Cymaenes lumina (Herrich-Schäffer, 1869)
- Carystus salenus Mabille, 1883 - transferred to Synapte salenus (Mabille, 1883)
- Carystus simulius Druce, 1876 - transferred to Lindra simulius (Druce, 1876)
- Carystus tetragraphus Mabille, 1891 - synonymized with Lotongus calathus (Hewitson, 1876)
