= Victoricus =

Victoricus may refer to:

- Victoricus of Amiens (died circa 287-303), martyr
- Victoricus of Carthage (died 259), one of the Martyrs of Carthage under Valerian
