= Briccius =

Briccius is a masculine given name. Notable people with the name include:

- Briccius Báthory (died 1322), Hungarian nobleman
- Briccius (bishop of Csanád) (died 1275), bishop of Csanád, Kingdom of Hungary
- Briccius (bishop of Vác) (fl. 1221–1236), bishop of Vác, Kingdom of Hungary
