= Macer =

A macer is an officer who bears a ceremonial mace.

Macer is a Roman cognomen meaning "lean".

- Aemilius Macer was a Roman poet of the late Republic.
- Aemilius Macer (jurist) a Roman jurist of the third century AD.
- Quintus Baebius Macer, Roman senator of first and second centuries AD.
- Gaius Caesonius Macer Rufinianus, Roman military officer of the second century AD.
- Lucius Caesonius Lucillus Macer Rufinianus, Roman senator and military officer of the third century AD.
- Publius Calpurnius Macer Caulius Rufus, Roman senator of the second century AD.
- Lucius Clodius Macer was a legatus of the Roman Empire in Africa in the time of Nero.
- Gaius Licinius Macer (d. 66 BC), was an official and annalist of ancient Rome.
- Licinius Macer Calvus, Roman orator and poet of the first century BC.
- Martius Macer, Roman general who commanded a force of gladiators under Otho.

Also, Macer may refer to:

- The Macer Floridus, an eleventh-century herbal.
- Karlee Macer, Democratic member of the Indiana House of Representatives.
- Monica Macer, American writer and producer.
- Reinald Macer (died 1213), Cistercian monk and bishop.
- Joe Macer, fictional character from the BBC soap opera EastEnders.
- Nick Macer, British nurseryman.
- Kate Macer, a character in the 2015 film Sicario, played by Emily Blunt
- Megan and Liz fans are called Macers
