= Decianus (disambiguation) =

Decianus is the name of several ancient Romans, including:

- C. Appuleius Decianus, tribune of the plebs in 98 BC
- Catus Decianus, the procurator of Roman Britain in 61 AD who created the conditions for Boudica's revolt

Decianus is also the Latin form of the Italian name Deciano or Deciani:

- Tiberio Deciani, Italian jurist and humanist (1509–1582).
