= Natalis =

Natalis may refer to:

- Natalis of Ulster (died 564), Irish monk and saint
- Natalis (bishop of Milan), bishop of Milan in 8th century, and saint
- Antonius Natalis, Ancient Roman conspirator
- Noël Alexandre (1639–1724), French theologian, author, and ecclesiastical historian
