= Basilus =

Ancient Roman third name

Basilus was the name of a family of the Minucia gens. Persons of this name occur only in the first century BCE. It is frequently written "Basilius", but scholars believe that the correct rendering from the best manuscripts is actually "Basilus", which is supported by some lines of the poet Lucan.
