= Nigrinus =

Nigrinus may refer to:

== People ==
- Bartholomaeus Nigrinus (1595–1646), German protestant theologian
- Georgius Nigrinus (fl. 1571/72–1606), Czech printer
- Gaius Avidius Nigrinus (died 118 AD), Roman senator
- Marcus Cornelius Nigrinus Curiatius Maternus, Roman senator
