= Cursor =

Cursor may refer to:

== Computing ==
- Cursor (code editor), an AI powered integrated development environment
- Cursor (user interface), an indicator used to show the current position for user interaction on a computer monitor or other display device
- Cursor (databases), a control structure that enables traversal over the records in a database
- Cursor, a value that is the position of an object in some known data structure, a predecessor of pointers

== People ==
- People with this Roman cognomen include:
  - Lucius Papirius Cursor (c.365–after 310 BC), Roman senator, five times consul, two times dictator
  - Lucius Papirius Cursor (consul in 293 and 272 BC)

== Other uses ==
- Cursor (slide rule), indicates corresponding points on scales that are not adjacent to each other
- Cursor Models, a former German company making models of vehicles
- CURSOR, an early magazine distributed on cassette from 1978 and into the early 1980s
- Cursor, a holographic sidekick character from the TV series Automan
- "Cursor", a song by Purple Kiss from their 2022 EP MemeM

== See also ==
- Pointer (graphical user interfaces), commonly called a mouse cursor
