= Scribonianus =

Scribonianus is a surname. Notable people with the surname include:

- Lucius Arruntius Camillus Scribonianus (fl. 8 AD–32 AD), Roman senator
- Marcus Licinius Scribonianus Camerinus (fl. mid-1st century AD), Roman senator
