= Amabilis =

Amabilis may refer to:

== People ==
- Amabilis of Riom, a Gallo-Roman saint
- Jonathan Amabilis, Mexican musician
- Sister Amabilis, religious name of Annie Chambers Ketchum (1824-1904), American educator, lecturer, writer

== Science ==
- Abies amabilis, a species of conifer
- Amabilis, a genus containing only species Amabilis uchoensis, a prehistoric turtle
