= Processus =

The word Processus may refer to:

- In the field of Anatomy, processus is Latin for process, which is an outgrowth of tissue
- Processus (Kingdom of Hungary), small administrative units of the Kingdom of Hungary
- Saint Processus
