= Decimus =

Decimus may refer to:

== Romen praenomen ==
- Decimus (praenomen)
- Decimus Carfulenus (died 43 BC), Roman statesman
- Decimus Haterius Agrippa (died 32 AD), consul in 22 AD
- Decimus Junius Brutus (consul 77 BC)
- Decimus Junius Brutus Albinus (c. 81 BC–43 BC), Roman politician and general, assassin of Julius Caesar
- Decimus Junius Brutus Callaicus (180 BC–113 BC), Roman politician and general
- Decimus Junius Silanus Torquatus (16 AD–64 AD), consul in AD 53
- Decimus Junius Silanus (consul) (fl. 70–62 BC)
- Decimus Junius Silanus (translator of Mago) (fl. 2nd century BC)
- Decimus Laberius (c. 105 BC–43 BC), Roman eques and writer
- Decimus Laelius (fl. 1st century BC), Roman lawyer and tribune of the plebs
- Decimus Laelius Balbus, consul in 6 BC
- Decimus Valerius Asiaticus (c. 5 BC–47 AD), Roman senator
- Decimus Valerius Asiaticus (Legatus) (35-after 69 AD), Roman senator, Legatus of Gallia Belgica
- Ausonius (Decimus Magnus Ausonius, c. 310–c. 395), Roman poet and rhetorician
- Balbinus (Decimus Caelius Calvinus Balbinus, c. 165–238), Roman emperor in 238
- Clodius Albinus (c. 150–197), Roman usurper
- Juvenal (Decimus Junius Juvenalis), poet of the 1st century AD

== Given name ==
- Decimus Burton (1800–1881), English architect
- Decimus Govett (1827–1912), Anglican priest

== Pen-name ==
- Thomas Chatterton (1752–1780), English poet
