= Pera =

Pera may refer to:

== Places ==
- Pera (Beyoğlu), a district in Istanbul formerly called Pera, now called Beyoğlu
  - Galata, a neighbourhood of Beyoğlu, often referred to as Pera in the past
- Pêra (Caparica), a Portuguese locality in the district of Setúbal
- Pera (San Giovanni di Fassa), an Italian hamlet in the municipality of San Giovanni di Fassa, in Trentino
- Pêra (Silves), a Portuguese parish in the district of Faro in the Algarve
- Pera Orinis, a village in Cyprus

== Other uses ==
- Pera (surname)
- The Pera, a ship of the Dutch East India Company
- Peda or Pera, a dessert of the Indian subcontinent
- Pera (plant), a plant genus in the family Peraceae
- Public Employees Retirement Association, the name of several public employee pension plans in the United States
- Peripheral ERA, a baseball statistic
- Purdue Enterprise Reference Architecture
- perA, a mycotoxin biosynthesis gene
