= Achaicus =

Achaicus may refer to:

- Lucius Mummius Achaicus, a 2nd-century BCE Roman statesman and general
- Achaicus of Corinth, who according to the Bible, carried a letter from the Corinthians to St. Paul, and from St. Paul to the Corinthians
