= Bradua =

Bradua was a Roman cognomen. Notable people with the this cognomen include:

- Atticus Bradua (around 145-after 209), Roman politician
- Marcus Atilius Bradua, Roman politician
- Appius Annius Atilius Bradua, Roman senator
- Marcus Atilius Postumus Bradua, Roman senator
