= Velox =

Velox, is a Latin word meaning "swift" or "rapid". Velox may also refer to:

== Vehicles ==
- Velox (execution engine), a C++ open source composable execution engine for data management systems
- Heine-Velox, a luxury car made by Gustav Heine
- HMS Velox (D34), a British 'V' class destroyer built in 1918
- ST Velox, a tugboat in service with D Tripcovich & Co, Italy from 1956-76
- Vauxhall 30-98 Velox, a British sports and racing car made between 1913 and 1927
- Vauxhall Velox (L-Type), a British medium-sized saloon car between 1948 and 1965
- Vickers Velox, a variant of the Vickers Vellore aircraft, also written as Vellox
- Velox, an early Czech automobile manufacturer based in Karlín

== Sport ==
- Velox (football club), one of the predecessors of the Dutch football club FC Utrecht
- Velox Valhallians, a rugby club located in Victoria, British Columbia, on Vancouver Island

== Other ==
- Oi Velox, the brand name for Oi's ADSL service
- Velox boiler, a forced-circulation boiler
- Velox photographic paper, invented by Leo Baekeland in 1893
- Velox (fireboat), a New York City fireboat
- Velox (mantis), a genus in family Liturgusidae
