= Probus =

Probus may refer to:

== People ==
- Marcus Valerius Probus (c. 20/30–105 AD), Roman grammarian
- Marcus Pomponius Maecius Probus, consul in 228
- Probus (emperor), Roman Emperor (276–282)
- Probus of Byzantium (–306), Bishop of Byzantium from 293 to 306
- Saint Probus of Side, martyr of the Diocletian persecution (c. 304 AD)
- St Probus (Cornish), unknown Cornish saint and patron of the Cornish village of that name.
- Sextus Claudius Petronius Probus (floruit 358–390), a powerful Roman senator of the fourth century
- Anicius Petronius Probus, Roman consul in 406
- Probus, martyr of 437
- Probus (son of Magnus), Gallo-Roman senator of the fifth century
- Anicius Probus (fl. 459), a Roman senator of the 5th century
- Probus (consul 502), consul in 502
- Probus (consul 513), Flavius Probus, consul in 513
- Anastasius (consul 517), Flavius Anastasius Paulus Probus Sabinianus Pompeius, consul in 517
- Flavius Anicius Probus Iunior, consul in 525
- Rufius Gennadius Probus Orestes, consul in 530
- Henryk IV Probus (c. 1258–1290), High Duke of Poland
- Probus Brittanicus, pseudonym of Samuel Johnson (1709–1784), English lexicographer, playwright and critic
- Probus, pseudonym of Charlotte Forman (1715–1787), Anglo-Irish journalist
- Probus, pseudonym of Thomas Chatterton (1752–1770), English poet
- Probus, pseudonym of Nancy H. Adsit (1825–1902), art educator

== Other uses ==
- Probus, Cornwall, a village near Truro in the UK
- Probus: International Journal of Latin and Romance Linguistics
- Probus Clubs, an international movement catering to the interests of retired or semi-retired professional or business people
- Probus Management, a former bus company in the UK, now part of Go West Midlands
