= Erasinus =

Scientific classification
- Kingdom: Animalia
- Phylum: Arthropoda
- Subphylum: Chelicerata
- Class: Arachnida
- Order: Araneae
- Infraorder: Araneomorphae
- Family: Salticidae
- Subfamily: Salticinae
- Genus: Erasinus; Simon, 1899

Type species
- Erasinus flagellifer Simon, 1899

Species
- See text.

Genus of spiders

Erasinus is a genus of the spider family Salticidae (jumping spiders).

All three described species are only known from males. Simon thought that they were close to Viciria. Judging from the shape of the male palp of E. gracilis, it belongs to the same genus as Epeus, which was split from Viciria in 1984.

Erasinus labiatus was transferred to Portia by Fred R. Wanless in 1978.

== Name ==
Erasinos was a river god of Arkadia and Argos in southern Greece.

== Species ==
- Erasinus flagellifer Simon, 1899 – Sumatra
- Erasinus flavibarbis Simon, 1902 – Java
- Erasinus gracilis Peckham & Peckham, 1907 – Borneo
