= Eparchius =

Eparchius may refer to:

- Eparchius Avitus (died 456/7), Roman emperor from 455 to 456
- Saint Cybard or Eparchius (504–581), Christian monk and hermit
