= Grumio =

Grumio may refer to:

- Grumio, a slave cook in the Cambridge Latin Course stories
- Grumio, slave cook of Lucius Caecilius Iucundus
- Grumio, the slave of Marcus and Stylax in the TV series Plebs
- A comic figure in Shakespeare's The Taming of the Shrew
- Grumio, a slave in the play Mostellaria by Plautus
