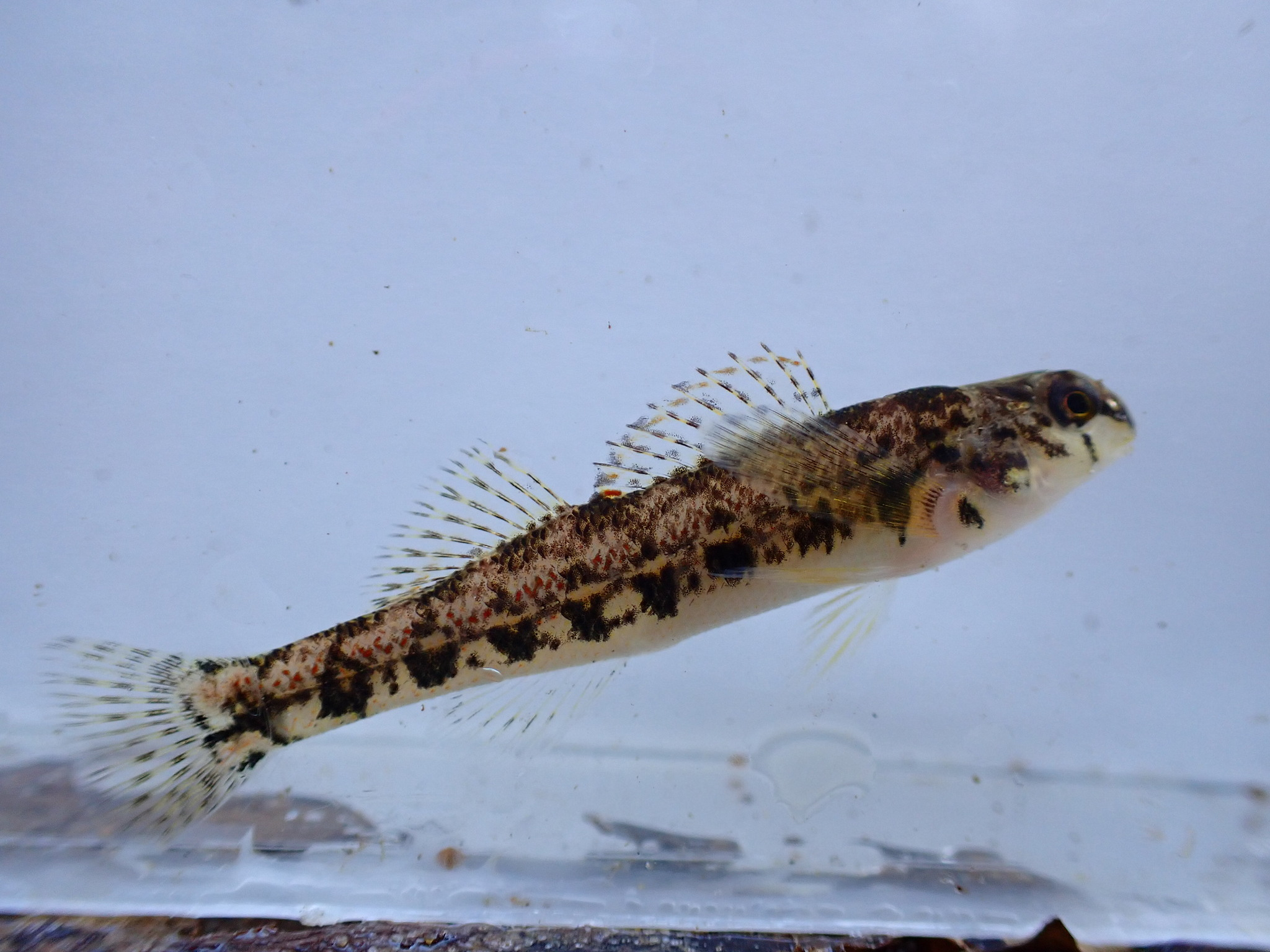

Conservation status
- Vulnerable (IUCN 3.1)

Scientific classification
- Kingdom: Animalia
- Phylum: Chordata
- Class: Actinopterygii
- Order: Perciformes
- Family: Percidae
- Genus: Etheostoma
- Species: E. bellator

Binomial name
- Etheostoma bellator (Suttkus & R. M. Bailey, 1993)

= Warrior darter =

Species of fish

The warrior darter (Etheostoma bellator) is a species of freshwater ray-finned fish, a darter from the subfamily Etheostomatinae, part of the family Percidae, which also contains the perches, ruffes and pikeperches. It is endemic to the eastern United States, where it occurs in the Black Warrior River system above the fall line in Mulberry Fork, Locust Fork, and Valley creek, Alabama. It inhabits small and medium-sized rubble-strewn streams, in slow to fast current over substrates of bedrock, cobble, or gravel; moderately flowing cobble riffles; and shallow pools over coarse gravel above riffles.
