= Colonus =

Colonus may refer to:

- Colonus (person), a tenant farmer from the late Roman Empire and Early Middle Ages
- Colonus (spider), a genus of jumping spiders
- Kolonos, a modern neighborhood in Athens
- Colonus (Attica) (also Hippeios Colonus, Colonus Hippius, Hippius Colonus), an ancient-Greece deme near Athens
- Agoraios Kolonos, a hill near the Temple of Hephaestus
- Kolonos Hill, a hill in Central Greece
