= Arvina =

Arvina can refer to a number of different things:

== People ==
- Aulus Cornelius Arvina, fetialis of the 4th century BCE
- Aulus Cornelius Cossus Arvina, Roman politician of the mid 4th century BC
- Publius Cornelius Arvina, Roman politician and general who lived in the late 4th century and early 3rd century BC
- Gaius Papirius Carbo Arvina, Roman orator and politician of the 1st century BC

== Other ==
- Albanello bianco
