= Praetextatus =

Prætextatus or Praetextatus may refer to:

- Prætextatus (Bishop of Rouen), also known as Saint Prix
- Vettius Agorius Praetextatus, 4th-century Roman aristocrat
- Gaius Asinius Lepidus Praetextatus, Roman consul in 242

== See also ==
- Praetexta, a type of Roman historical drama
