= Perpetuus =

Perpetuus is Latin for "continuous, entire or universal", and can refer to:

People

- Saint Perpetuus, sixth bishop of Tours
- L. Marius Maximus Perpetuus Aurelianus II, a Roman consul (see List of late imperial Roman consuls)

Titles

- dictator perpetuo, Latin for "dictator in perpetuity"
- A parish priest of a particular type was called a perpetual curate (curatus perpetuus)

Other

- Perpetuum mobile
