= Quintian =

Quintian or Quintianus (Latin), from Quintus, is a male given name meaning "the fifth" and may refer to:

== People ==
- Appius Claudius Quintianus (2nd century), nephew of Tiberius Claudius Pompeianus, involved in a plot to kill Commodus
- Quintian of Rome (3rd century), Roman confessor and saint
- Quintian of Évora (4th century), Bishop of Évora
- Quintian, Lucius and Julian (5th century), African martyrs and saints
- Quintian of Rodez (6th century), bishop and saint

== See also ==
- Agatha of Sicily for Quintianus, Roman governor of Sicily in the third century
