= Justus Baronius Calvinus =

German theologian

Justus Baronius Calvinus (c. 1570 - d. after 1606) was a German theologian, a Catholic convert and apologist.

== Life ==
He was born of Calvinist parents and educated at Heidelberg, where he took a course in theology. His study of the Church Fathers inclined him towards Catholicism and finally led him to Rome. There he was kindly received by Cardinal Bellarmine, Cardinal Baronius, and Pope Clement VIII. His gratitude to Baronius caused him to add that cardinal's name to his own.

On his return to Germany, he became a Catholic (1601) and a staunch defender of his faith. In his "Apologia" (Mainz, 1601) he gives the reasons for his conversion and in his "Praescriptionum adversus haereticos ... Tractatus" (ibid. 1602, 1756) he appeals to the Fathers in support of the truth of Catholicism.
