= Maluginensis =

Maluginensis is an ancient Roman cognomen. Notable people with this cognomen include:

- Lucius Cornelius Maluginensis Uritinus (fl. 459–458 BC), Roman politician
- Marcus Cornelius Maluginensis (fl. 450–449 BC), Roman politician
- Publius Cornelius Maluginensis (consular tribune 404 BC), Roman politician
- Publius Cornelius Maluginensis Scipio (consular tribune 395 BC), Roman politician
- Servius Cornelius Maluginensis (died 453 BC), Roman senator
- Servius Cornelius Maluginensis (consular tribune 386 BC), Roman politician
- Servius Cornelius Lentulus Maluginensis (died 23 AD), Roman statesman
