= Hosticus =

Scientific classification
- Missing taxonomy template (fix): Hosticus
- Species: Template:Taxonomy/HosticusH. curiosus

Binomial name
- Template:Taxonomy/HosticusHosticus curiosus (Galileo & Martins, 2010)

Synonyms
- Alienus Galileo & Martins, 2010; Alienus curiosus Galileo & Martins, 2010

Species of beetle

Hosticus curiosus is a species of beetle in the family Cerambycidae, and the only species in the genus Hosticus. It was described by Galileo and Martins in 2010. It is found in Brazil.
