= Yair Censor =

Israeli mathematician

- יאיר צנזור
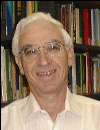
- Born: November 29, 1943 (age 82); Rishon LeZion, Israel
- Citizenship: Israeli
- Education: Technion - Israel Institute of Technology
- Known for: Medical Imaging, Radiation Therapy Treatment Planning
- Awards: ICS Prize for Research Excellence in the Interface Between Operations Research and Computer Science (1999)
- Scientific career
- Fields: Computational Mathematics, Optimization
- Workplaces: University of Haifa
- Thesis: (1975)
- Doctoral advisor: Adi Ben-Israel

Yair Censor (Hebrew: יאיר צנזור; born November 29, 1943) is an Israeli mathematician and professor emeritus at the University of Haifa, specializing in computational mathematics and optimization, as well as applications of these fields, in particular to medical imaging and radiation therapy treatment planning.

== Biography ==
Yair Censor was born in Rishon LeZion. After serving in the IDF, he studied at the Technion in Haifa, where he earned his D.Sc. in 1975 under the supervision of Professor Adi Ben-Israel.

== Academic career ==
Censor joined the Department of Mathematics at the University of Haifa in 1979, became full professor in 1989, and became professor emeritus in 2012. His research focuses on mathematical aspects of Intensity-Modulated Radiation Therapy (IMRT). In 2002, he founded the Center for Computational Mathematics and Scientific Computation at the University of Haifa. In recent years he is involved with research about the Superiorization Methodology.

Together with S.A. Zenios, he co-authored the book Parallel Optimization: Theory, Algorithms, and Applications (Oxford University Press, New York, NY, USA, 1997), for which he received the 1999 ICS (INFORMS Computing Society) Prize for Research Excellence in the Interface Between Operations Research and Computer Science.

Active in the struggle to preserve the academic freedom of the research universities in Israel, Censor was one of the founders of the Inter-Senate Committee (ISC) of the Universities for the Protection of Academic Independence.

== See also ==
- Education in Israel
