= Rufius Probianus =

5th-century Roman

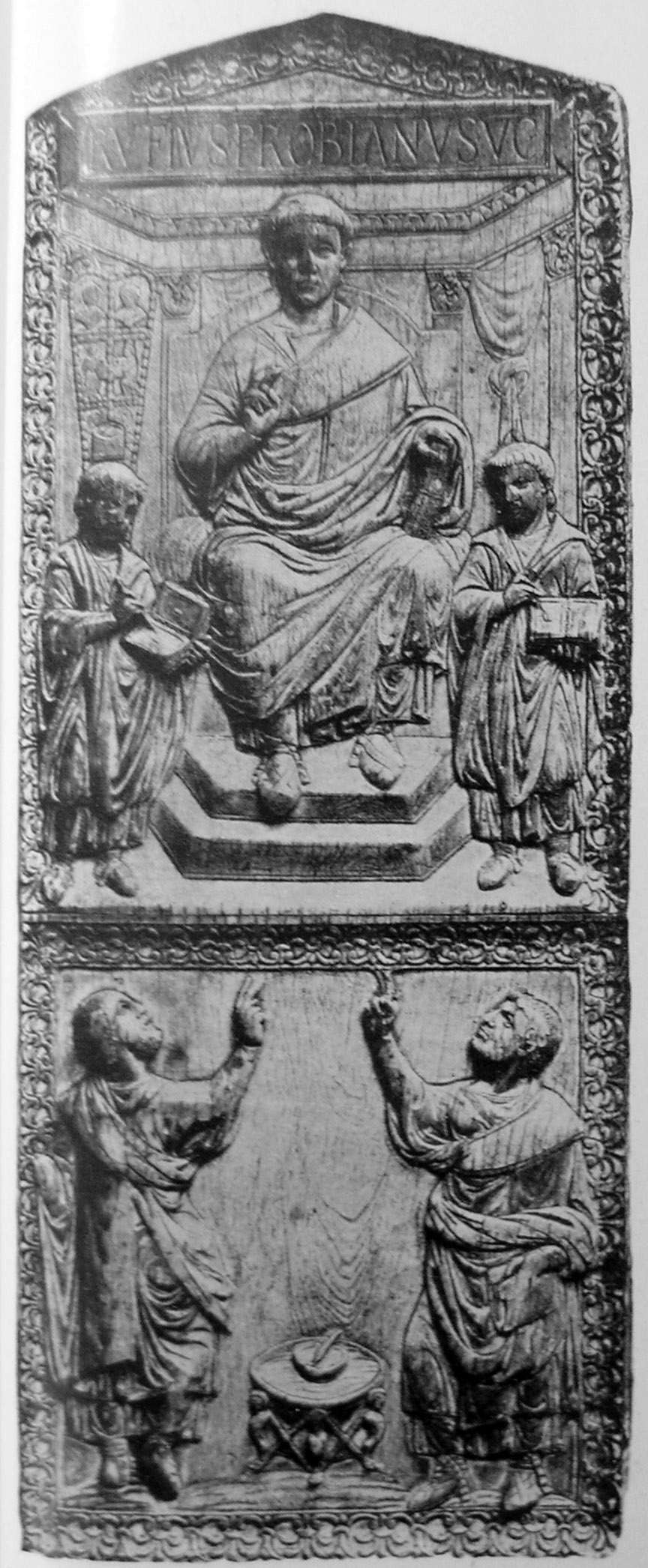
The ivory diptych of Probianus

Rufius Probianus (fl. 400 AD) was a vicarius of the Late Roman Empire. He is known from an ivory diptych on which he appears with his right hand lifted in an oratorical gesture to indicate that he is either speaking or has the right to speak.

== The Ivory Diptych of Rufius Probianus ==
=== Background ===
It is not known for certain when the ivory diptych of Rufius Probianus was created, it is believed to be dated to between the years 396 AD and 416 AD. However in the year 384 the emperor of the eastern empire, Theodosius I, decided to enact a law that forbid the issuance of gold and diptychs made of ivory by anyone other than a consul. There is evidence of diptychs being created that appear to be in opposition of this law and many scholars believe that the law was ignored, or that special permission was given to allow the creation of these ivory diptychs. Rufius Probianus was but one example of a lesser official issuing an ivory diptych as he was only vicarius of the city of Rome, a station well below that of a consul. Another famous example of a Roman official who presented diptychs in opposition of the law was Aurelius Symmachus who issued diptychs to his son to celebrate his achievements.

Despite diptychs presumably being banned at the time of Theodosius rule, he was only emperor of the eastern half of the empire. It is believed by some that the laws passed by the emperors of each half of the Roman empire, often only applied to the territories where they were enacted. This would mean that the law may not have held in the western half of the empire where Rufius Probianus held office in Rome.

=== Location ===
The Diptych has traveled around through the years and can be linked to Werden Abbey where it was paired with the Vita Secunda manuscript into a book box. From there it was acquired by the Library in Münster and then purchased by the Berlin State Library, which is owned by the Prussian Cultural Heritage Foundation, where it currently resides.

=== Construction and Features ===
The diptych itself is very ornate. Most diptychs are carved out of ivory and have two plates that are connected through some sort of hinge. Both plates of the Probianus diptych are nearly identical in size with dimensions of approximately 317 mm x 129 mm. There are two inscriptions on the diptych. The first inscription along the top reads "Rufius Probianus is vicarius of the city of Rome". The second inscription is inside the left panel on a scroll that Probianus appears to be writing in and reads "May Probianus prosper!" The right panel shows Probianus seated with his right arm up and holding up two fingers. In both panels Probianus is flanked by two notaries on either side and what could be petitioners below. There are busts of the current Roman emperors in the background behind Probianus.
