= Atratinus =

Atratinus is a Roman cognomen that may refer to:

- Aulus Sempronius Atratinus (consul 497 BC), prefect of Rome during the Battle of Lake Regillus
- Lucius Sempronius Atratinus (consul 444 BC)
- Aulus Sempronius Atratinus (consular tribune 444 BC)
- Aulus Sempronius Atratinus (consular tribune 425 BC), one of the first censors of the Roman Republic
- Gaius Sempronius Atratinus, consul of the Roman Republic in 423 BC
- Aulus Sempronius Atratinus, magister equitum in 380 BC
- Lucius Sempronius Atratinus (consul 34 BC)
- Marcus Asinius Atratinus, consul of the Roman Empire in 89 AD
