= Ennodius =

Ennodius may refer to:

- Ennoius, proconsul of Africa in 395
- Felix Ennodius, proconsul of Africa c. 420
- Ennodius Messala, Roman senator, consul in 506
- Magnus Felix Ennodius, bishop of Pavia 514–521
- Ennodius (beetle), leaf beetles in the subfamily Eumolpinae
