= Publicus =

Publicus may refer to:

- The Ager publicus is the Latin language name for the public land of the Roman Republic and Empire.
- Cursus publicus was the courier service of the Roman Empire.

See also

- Publius (disambiguation)
