= Urbicus =

Urbicus is Latin for "of the city" or "civic", and may refer to:

- Aggenus Urbicus, Roman technical writer
- Quintus Lollius Urbicus, Roman governor of Britain
