= Camerinus =

Ancient Roman cognomen

Camerinus is an ancient Roman cognomen. Notable people with this cognomen include:

- Camerinus Antistius Vetus, 1st century Roman senator
- Marcus Licinius Scribonianus Camerinus, 1st century Roman senator
- Quintus Sulpicius Camerinus, 1st century Roman senator
- Quintus Sulpicius Camerinus Cornutus (consul) (fl. 490–488 BC), Roman politician
- Quintus Sulpicius Camerinus Cornutus (consular tribune) (fl. 402–398 BC), Roman consular tribune
- Quintus Sulpicius Camerinus Peticus (died 67), Roman senator
- Quintus Sulpicius Camerinus Praetextatus (fl. 434 BC), Roman consul
- Servius Sulpicius Camerinus Cornutus (fl. c. 500–463 BC), Roman consul
- Servius Sulpicius Camerinus Cornutus (consul 461 BC) (fl. c. 461–446 BC), Roman politician
