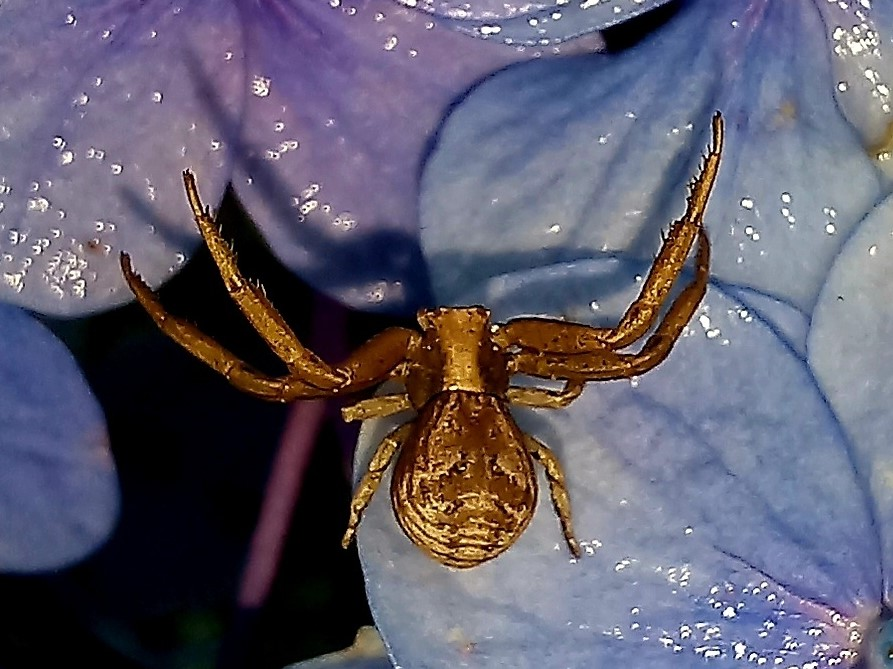
- Uraarachne variegata

Scientific classification
- Kingdom: Animalia
- Phylum: Arthropoda
- Subphylum: Chelicerata
- Class: Arachnida
- Order: Araneae
- Infraorder: Araneomorphae
- Family: Thomisidae
- Genus: Uraarachne; Keyserling

Type species
- Uraarachne longa

Species
- 11, see text

= Uraarachne =

Genus of spiders

Uraarachne is a genus of spiders in the family Thomisidae. It was first described in 1880 by Keyserling. As of 2022, it contains 11 South American species.

== Species ==
As of June 2020 it contains 11 species:

- Uraarachne brevipes (Simon, 1886) — Uruguay
- Uraarachne ceratophrys (Grismado & Achitte-Schmutzler, 2020) — Argentina
- Uraarachne cornuta (Simon, 1886) — Paraguay, Uruguay, Argentina
- Uraarachne kapiity (Grismado & Achitte-Schmutzler, 2020) — Paraguay, Argentina
- Uraarachne longa (Keyserling, 1880) — Brazil, Paraguay
- Uraarachne panthera (Grismado & Achitte-Schmutzler, 2020) — Argentina
- Uraarachne plana (Simon, 1895) — Paraguay, Argentina
- Uraarachne runcinioides (Simon, 1886) — Uruguay, Argentina
- Uraarachne toro (Grismado & Achitte-Schmutzler, 2020) — Argentina
- Uraarachne variegata (Mello-Leitão, 1941) — Paraguay, Argentina
- Uraarachne vittata (Caporiacco, 1954) — French Guiana
