= Quintus Julius Hilarianus =

The Libellus in Reginensis 213, a 9th-century manuscript

Quintus Julius Hilarianus (fl. 397), commonly known as Hilarian, was a Roman African chronographer and computist. He is sometimes identified with the bishop Hilarianus who attended the Council of Carthage in 411. This is uncertain and he may have even been a Donatist. His writings point to his having been a monk.

Hilarianus is known for two works in Latin:

- De ratione Paschae et mensis (or Expositum de die Paschae et mensis), completed on 5 March 397. It is a treatise about the importance of celebrating Easter. It has been read as a sermon, but this is not certain. It is used in the Carthaginian Computus of 455, which also cites a letter of one Agriustias to Hilarianus on the subject of computus.
- Chronologia siue Libellus de mundi duratione (or De cursu temporum), a treatise on salvation history written later in 397. It argues that the Second Coming will occur in 498, when the Earth is 6,000 years old. There will follow the thousand-year reign of Christ and a final battle. Since the end of the world is placed beyond the lifetime of Hilarianus or his initial audience, the Libellus does not seem to be a response to contemporary events but "a statement about hope for life eternal". Its brand of millenarianism, however, soon came to be regarded as heresy, making Hilarianus "one of [its] last vocal proponents". Nevertheless, in two groups of manuscripts the Libellus was incorporated into the compilation known as the Chronicle of Fredegar. In one group, it replaces the contribution of the Liber generationis. The 9th-century manuscript Reginensis 213 opens with it.

Some scholars have suggested Hilarianus as the author of the Liber genealogus.

== Bibliography ==
- Croke, Brian (2018). "Hilarianus, Q. Iulius". In Nicholson, Oliver (ed.). The Oxford Dictionary of Late Antiquity, Volume 1: A–I. Oxford: Oxford University Press. p. 720. ISBN 978-0-19-881624-9.
- Mandouze, André, ed. (1982). Prosopographie chrétienne du Bas-Empire. Vol. 1: Prosopographie de l'Afrique chrétienne (303–533). Éditions du Centre national de la recherche scientifique.
- Martindale, John R., ed. (1980). The Prosopography of the Later Roman Empire: Volume II, AD 395–527. Cambridge: Cambridge University Press. ISBN 0-521-20159-4.
- Palmer, James (2014). The Apocalypse in the Early Middle Ages. Cambridge University Press.
- Van Nuffelen, Peter (2020). "What Happened after Eusebius? Chronicles and Narrative Identities in the Fourth Century". In Richard Flower; Morwenna Ludlow (eds.). Rhetoric and Religious Identity in Late Antiquity. Oxford University Press. pp. 160–179.
- van Hees, Bart (2021). "Minor Annals and Frankish History Writing". The Medieval Chronicle. 14: 92–112.
- Wallace-Hadrill, J. M., ed. (1960). The Fourth Book of the Chronicle of Fredegar with its Continuations. Thomas Nelson and Sons.
