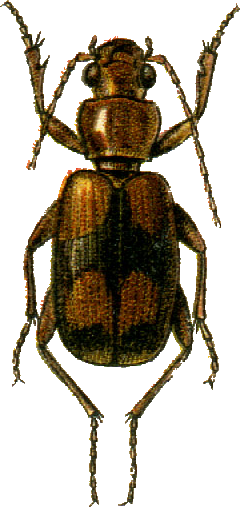
- Glycia cingulata

Scientific classification
- Domain: Eukaryota
- Kingdom: Animalia
- Phylum: Arthropoda
- Class: Insecta
- Order: Coleoptera
- Suborder: Adephaga
- Family: Carabidae
- Subfamily: Lebiinae
- Tribe: Lebiini
- Subtribe: Agrina
- Genus: Glycia; Chaudoir, 1842

= Glycia =

Genus of beetles

Glycia is a genus in the beetle family Carabidae. There are about five described species in Glycia.

== Species ==
These five species belong to the genus Glycia:

- Glycia bimaculata Bedel, 1907
- Glycia rufolimbata Maindron, 1905
- Glycia socotrana Felix, 2017
- Glycia spencei (Gistel, 1840)
- Glycia unicolor Chaudoir, 1848
