= Soranus =

In Latin, Soranus is an adjectival toponym indicating origin from the town of Sora.

== Name ==
The name Soranus may refer to:

- Soranus of Ephesus, Greek physician and medical writer
- Soranus (mythology), a god adopted by the ancient Romans
- Quintus Valerius Soranus, Roman author and tribune, ostensibly executed for revealing the arcane name of Rome
- Quintus Marcius Barea Soranus, Roman consul in 34 AD
- Quintus Marcius Barea Soranus, Roman consul in 52 AD and son of the consul of 34 AD

== Pen-name ==
- Soranus was used as a pen-name by Voltaire
