= Eucherius =

Eucherius may refer to:

- Eucherius of Lyon (c. 380–c. 449), Archbishop of Lyon and Catholic and Eastern Orthodox saint
- Eucherius of Orléans (c. 687–743), Bishop of Orléans and saint
- Eucherius (son of Stilicho) (c. 388–c. 408), son of Stilicho, the magister militum of the Western Roman Empire

== See also ==
- Eucharius, bishop of Trier
