= Scaevola =

Scaevola or Scævola (Latin for "Lefty") may refer to:

- Gaius Mucius Scaevola, a legendary assassin said to have burnt his right hand away as a show of determination during the early years of the Roman Republic
- Muciii Scaevolae, a family in the Roman Republic
- Quintus Cervidius Scaevola, a Roman jurist
- Scaevola, a 1958 nuclear test undertaken by the United States as part of Operation Hardtack I
- Scaevola, the genus of fan-flowers
- Scaevola, a genus of extinct gastropods
