= Ismarus =

The name Ismarus may refer to:

- Ismarus (Thrace), a city of the Cicones, on the Aegean coast of Thrace, mentioned in the Odyssey
- A mountain of the same name, "Ismaros"; see Ismarus (Thrace)
- Ismarus (wasp), a genus of wasps

== Mythology ==
- Ismarus, defender of Thebes who killed Hippomedon
- Ismarus (Immaradus), son of Eumolpus and son-in-law of the Thracian king Tegyrios
