= Sophus =

Sophus or Sofus is a male given name. Notable people with the given name include:

== Sophus ==
- Sophus Aars (1841–1931), Norwegian civil servant and writer
- Sophus Andersen (1859–1923), Danish composer and music critic
- Sophus Black (1882–1960), Danish telegraph manager and art collector
- Sophus Bugge (1833–1907), Norwegian philologist and linguist
- Sophus Christensen (1848–1920), Norwegian military officer
- Sophus Frederik Kühnel (1851–1930), Danish architect
- Sophus Hagen (1842–1929), Danish composer
- Sophus Halle (1862–1924), Danish composer
- Sophus Hansen (1889–1962), Danish amateur football (soccer) player and referee
- Sophus Lie (1842–1899), Norwegian mathematician
- Sophus Michaëlis (1865–1932), Danish poet, novelist and playwright
- Sophus Müller (1846–1934), Danish archaeologist
- Sophus Nielsen (1888–1963), Danish amateur football player and manager
- Sophus Ruge (1831–1903), German geographer and historian
- Sophus Schandorph (1836–1901), Danish poet and novelist
- Sophus August Wilhelm Stein (1797–1868), Danish surgeon and anatomist
- Sophus Thalbitzer (1871–1941), Danish psychiatrist
- Sophus Torup (1861–1937), Danish physiologist
- Sophus Wangøe (1873–1943), Danish cinematographer
- Sophus Weidemann (1836–1894), Norwegian engineer and industrialist

== Sofus ==
- Carl Sofus Lumholtz (1851–1922), Norwegian explorer and ethnographer
- Sofus Arctander (1845–1924), Norwegian politician
- Sofus Berger (born 2003), Danish footballer
- Sofus Heggemsnes (born 1999), Norwegian artistic gymnast
- Sofus Johansen (1900–1974), Danish footballer and manager
- Sofus Johannesen (born 2007), Danish footballer
- Sofus Madsen (1881–1977), Norwegian sculptor
- Sofus Rose (1894–1974), Danish long-distance runner

== See also ==
- Father of Four and Uncle Sofus, 1957 Danish film
