= Apronianus =

Apronianus may refer to:

- Gaius Vipstanus Apronianus, Roman senator and proconsul of Africa in the 1st century AD
- Cassius Apronianus, Roman senator in the 2nd century AD, son-in-law of the historian Dio Chrysostom
- Apronianus, whom Cassius Dio tells us was governor of the province of Asia in 203 AD. He was unjustly condemned to death in his absence. (Cassius Dio, Roman History 76.8)
- Turcius Rufius Apronianus Asterius, aristocrat during the reign of Theoderic the Great, and Roman consul in 494
