= Tuccianus =

Tuccianus is a possible name for a governor of Britannia Inferior, a province of Roman Britain around AD 237. He may have governed since the removal of his predecessor Claudius Apellinus in 235 AD. Little else is known of him although the damaged inscription bearing his name does record him adding a building at Carrawburgh under Maximinus.

He might also have been an ancestor of Egnatius Tuccianus, who probably was curator of Dougga under Diocletian.
