= Herennius =

The name Herennius may refer to:

- Herennius Pontius (fl. c. 340 BC), Samnite statesman, father of Gaius Pontius
- Marcus Herennius (consul 93 BC)
- Gaius Herennius (otherwise unknown), addressee of the book Rhetorica ad Herennium
- Marcus Herennius Picens (consul 34 BC)
- Herennius Senecio (died c. 90), Roman writer, biographer of Helvidius Priscus
- Herennius Philo, also known as Philo of Byblos (c. 64–141), scholar
- Lucius Herennius Saturninus, suffect consul in AD 100
- Publius Herennius Dexippus (c. 210–273), the Greek historian most often known as Dexippus
- Herennius (fl. c. 240), a Neoplatonic philosopher; see Ammonius Saccas
- Herennius Modestinus (fl. c. 250), Roman jurist
- Herennius Etruscus (c. 227–251), Roman emperor

== See also ==
- Herennia Etruscilla, the mother of Herennius Etruscus
- Herennia gens, all people who had the gentilicium Herennius in their name.
