= Isauricus =

Isauricus is a victory title that may refer to:

- Publius Servilius Vatia Isauricus (consul 79 BC)
- Publius Servilius Vatia Isauricus (consul 48 BC)
- Quintus Antonius Isauricus, commander or a legion in Britain during the AD 130s
