= Cico P =

American rapper, singer and songwriter (born 1998)

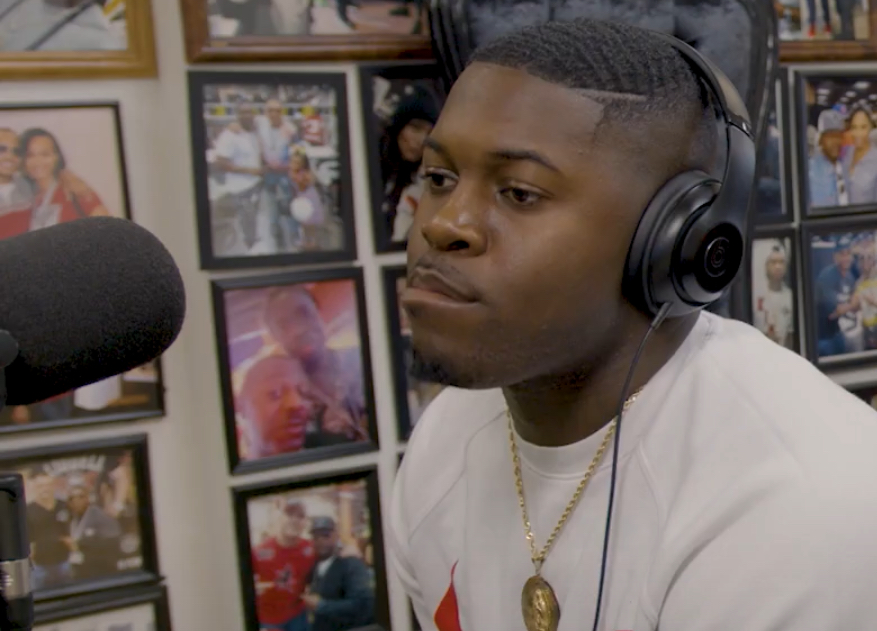
- Simms in 2021

Background information
- Also known as: Cicoeee P
- Born: Christopher Simms Jr. February 6, 1998 (age 28); Jacksonville, Texas, US
- Genres: Hip Hop
- Occupation: Rapper
- Instrument: Vocals
- Labels: APG, DawgTies Ent, DTE

Christopher Simms Jr. (born February 6, 1998), known by his stage name Cico P (formerly Cicoeee P), is an American rapper, singer, and songwriter.

== Early life and career ==
Simms is from Jacksonville, Texas. His single "Tampa" achieved viral popularity on TikTok in early 2021. "Tampa" catapulted Cico P to the top of the US Spotify Viral 50 chart as well as the #3 spot on Rolling Stone's Breakthrough 25 and #41 on Billboard's Emerging Artists.

== Discography ==
=== Mixtapes ===
| Title | Mixtape details |
|---|---|
| Bonfidential Files | Released: January 8, 2021; Label: DawgTies; Format: Digital download, streaming |
| SUA Files | Released: April 9, 2021; Label: DawgTies, APG; Format: Digital download, streaming |
| NawfJaxx | Released: July 14, 2021; Label: DawgTies, APG; Format: Digital download, streaming |

=== Charted singles ===
| Title | Year | Peak chart positions | | Certifications | Album |
| Title | Year | US | CAN | Certifications | Album |
|---|---|---|---|---|---|
| "Tampa" | 2021 | 91 | 99 | RIAA: Platinum | Bondifential Files, SUA Files and NawfJaxx |
