= Peticus =

Peticus is a name. Notable people with the name include:

- Gaius Sulpicius Peticus, Roman politician
- Quintus Sulpicius Camerinus Peticus (died 67), Roman senator
