= Coral Barbas =

Spanish chemist

- Education: Universidad Complutense de Madrid
- Scientific career
- Thesis: Preparación, puesta a punto y aplicaciones analíticas de electrodos selectivos de membrana heterogénea de Ag(I) y de Cu(II) (1989)

María del Coral Barbas Arribas (or Arriba) is a professor at the Universidad CEU San Pablo in Madrid, Spain who is known for her research on metabolomics and the integration of chemical data.

== Education and career ==
Barbas has a Ph.D. from Complutense University of Madrid. From 2005 until 2006 she was a Marie Curie fellow at King's College London. As of 2022 she is a professor of analytical chemistry at the Universidad CEU San Pablo and is the president of the Madrid section of the Spanish Royal Society of Chemistry.

== Research ==
Barbas is known for her research on metabolomics, a field she was first introduced to while she was a Marie Curie fellow. Her early research centered on the analysis of vitamins and development of chemical methods to analyze compounds such as caffeine. Her subsequent research has developed methods to analyze organic compounds in pharmaceutical drugs and foods, and defined biomarkers for diseases such as leukemia and Parkinson's disease. She is also known for defining quality assurance protocols for metabolomics data analysis and establishing workflows to analyze metabolomics data.

== Selected publications ==
- Herrera, E.; Barbas, C. (2001). "Vitamin E: action, metabolism and perspectives". Journal of Physiology and Biochemistry. 57 (1): 43–56. doi:10.1007/BF03179812. hdl:10637/720. ISSN 1138-7548. PMID 11519885. S2CID 7272312.
- Armitage, Emily G.; Barbas, Coral (2014-01-18). "Metabolomics in cancer biomarker discovery: Current trends and future perspectives". Journal of Pharmaceutical and Biomedical Analysis. 87: 1–11. doi:10.1016/j.jpba.2013.08.041. ISSN 0731-7085. PMID 24091079.
- Rupérez, F. J; Martı́n, D; Herrera, E; Barbas, C (2001-11-23). "Chromatographic analysis of α-tocopherol and related compounds in various matrices". Journal of Chromatography A. 935 (1): 45–69. doi:10.1016/S0021-9673(01)01101-3. ISSN 0021-9673. PMID 11762785.
- Garcia, Antonia; Barbas, Coral (2011). Metz, Thomas O. (ed.). Gas chromatography-mass spectrometry (GC-MS)-based metabolomics. Methods in Molecular Biology. Vol. 708. Totowa, NJ: Humana Press. pp. 191–204. doi:10.1007/978-1-61737-985-7_11. ISBN 978-1-61737-984-0. PMID 21207291.
- Mamani-Huanca, Maricruz; Gradillas, Ana; López-Gonzálvez, Ángeles; Barbas, Coral (2020-10-06). "Unraveling the Cyclization of L-Argininosuccinic Acid in Biological Samples: A Study via Mass Spectrometry and NMR Spectroscopy". Analytical Chemistry. 92 (19): 12891–12899. doi:10.1021/acs.analchem.0c01420. hdl:10637/14998. ISSN 0003-2700. PMID 32822159. S2CID 221236568.

== Awards and honors ==
The Analytical Scientist named Barbas to their 2016 Power List in recognition of her contributions to chemistry. In 2017, she was honored by Acta Sanitaria for her chemical research linking diabetes and obesity. In 2018, she received the International Award of the Belgian Society of Pharmaceutical Sciences.
