= Tertia gens =

Ancient Roman family

The gens Tertia was an obscure plebeian family at ancient Rome. Hardly any members of this gens are mentioned by Roman writers, but a few are known from inscriptions.

== Origin ==
The nomen Tertius is derived from the Latin for "third", which was used as a cognomen from the earliest period of Roman history. While it may anciently have been a praenomen corresponding with similar masculine names, such as Quintus, Sextus, and Decimus, only the feminine form, Tertia, appears to have been in use during the Republic, and only in imperial times does the masculine form appear, rarely, as a praenomen.

== Praenomina ==
The main praenomina of the Tertii seem to have been Titus, Aulus, Lucius, Marcus, and Publius. The filiation of one early member includes the Oscan praenomen Herius.

== Members ==
This list includes abbreviated praenomina. For an explanation of this practice, see filiation.

- Tertia, a favored mistress of Verres, was an actress in Sicily.
- Tiberius Tertius Heri f. Sapientinus, one of several persons who hosted ludi in honor of Jupiter Optimus Maximus, commemorated in an inscription from Carsulae in Umbria, dating from the latter half of the first century BC.
- Aulus Tertius, named in a first-century inscription from Herculaneum in Campania.
- Lucius Tertius L. f. Tertianus, supposedly a native of Heraclea in Lucania, was a soldier in the Legio XI Claudia. He was buried at Burnum in Dalmatia, aged forty, with a monument built by his heir, Lucius Pomponius Pollio, from the legacy left him by Tertianus, dating to the reigns of Claudius or Nero. The inscriptions naming him are thought to be forgeries.
- Titus Tertius Felix, a quaestor, together with Nemonius Senecio, the local caretaker, and the agent Gaius Atius Verecundus, made a donation to Fortuna at Mogontiacum in Germania Superior, according to an inscription dating between the reign of Vespasian and the middle of the second century.
- Publius Tertius Hilarus, dedicated a tomb at Rome, dating between the middle of the first century and the end of the second, for his wife, Claudia Flora, aged thirty years, ten months, and six days.
- Marcus Tertius Chrestus, a frumentarius, or grain merchant, named along with his daughter, Tertia Val[...] Romana, in a second- or third-century sepulchral inscription from Viminacium in Moesia Superior.
- Tertia M. f. Val[...] Romana, daughter of the grain merchant Marcus Tertius Chrstus, with whom she is named in a sepulchral inscription from Viminacium.
- Marcus Tertius Secundus, a soldier in the fifth cohort of the vigiles at Rome in AD 210, serving in the century of Aelius Torquatus.
- Publius Tertius Posterius, a veteran of the Legio I Minervia, buried at Mediolanum in Gallia Narbonensis, in a tomb dating between the middle of the second century, and the end of the third.

=== Undated Tertii ===
- Aulus Tertius, named in a sepulchral inscription from Rome.
- Aulus Tertius, named in a sepulchral inscription from Bononia in Cisalpine Gaul.
- Gaius Tertius, named in an inscription from Augusta Treverorum in Gallia Belgica.
- Sextus Tertius, buried at Aquinum in Latium.
- Titus Tertius Paullus, buried at Nemausus in Gallia Narbonensis, in a tomb built by his wife, Primigenia Aurelia, and freedman, Titus Tertius Verecundus.
- Lucius Tertius Secundus, a potter whose maker's mark is found on pottery from Arelate in Gallia Narbonensis.
- Titus Tertius Severus, curator of the colony at Aventicum in Germania Superior, was granted five thousand sestertii by a decree of the decurions.
- Titus Tertius T. l. Verecundus, the freedman of Titus Tertius Paullus, for whom he built a tomb at Nemausus, along with Paullus' wife, Primigenia Aurelia.

== See also ==
- List of Roman gentes

== Bibliography ==
- Marcus Tullius Cicero, In Verrem.
- Theodor Mommsen et alii, Corpus Inscriptionum Latinarum (The Body of Latin Inscriptions, abbreviated CIL), Berlin-Brandenburgische Akademie der Wissenschaften (1853–present).
- Archivio Storico Lombardo (Historical Archive of Lombardy, 1882–?).
- René Cagnat et alii, L'Année épigraphique (The Year in Epigraphy, abbreviated AE), Presses Universitaires de France (1888–present).
- George Davis Chase, "The Origin of Roman Praenomina", in Harvard Studies in Classical Philology, vol. VIII, pp. 103–184 (1897).
- La Carte Archéologique de la Gaule (Archaeological Map of Gaul, abbreviated CAG), Académie des Inscriptions et Belles-Lettres (1931–present).
- Fanou Papazoglou, Inscriptions de la Mésie Supérieure (Inscriptions of Moesia Superior, abbreviated IMS), Belgrade (1976–present).
