= Curvus =

Curvus may refer to:

- Curvus (fly), a genus of flies in the family Dolichopodidae
- Curvus, Roman cognomen
  - Marcus Fulvius Curvus Paetinus, Roman suffect consul in 305 BC
  - Lucius Fulvius Curvus, Roman consul in 322 BC
