= Eliphas Buffett House =

Historic house in New York, United States

- U.S. National Register of Historic Places
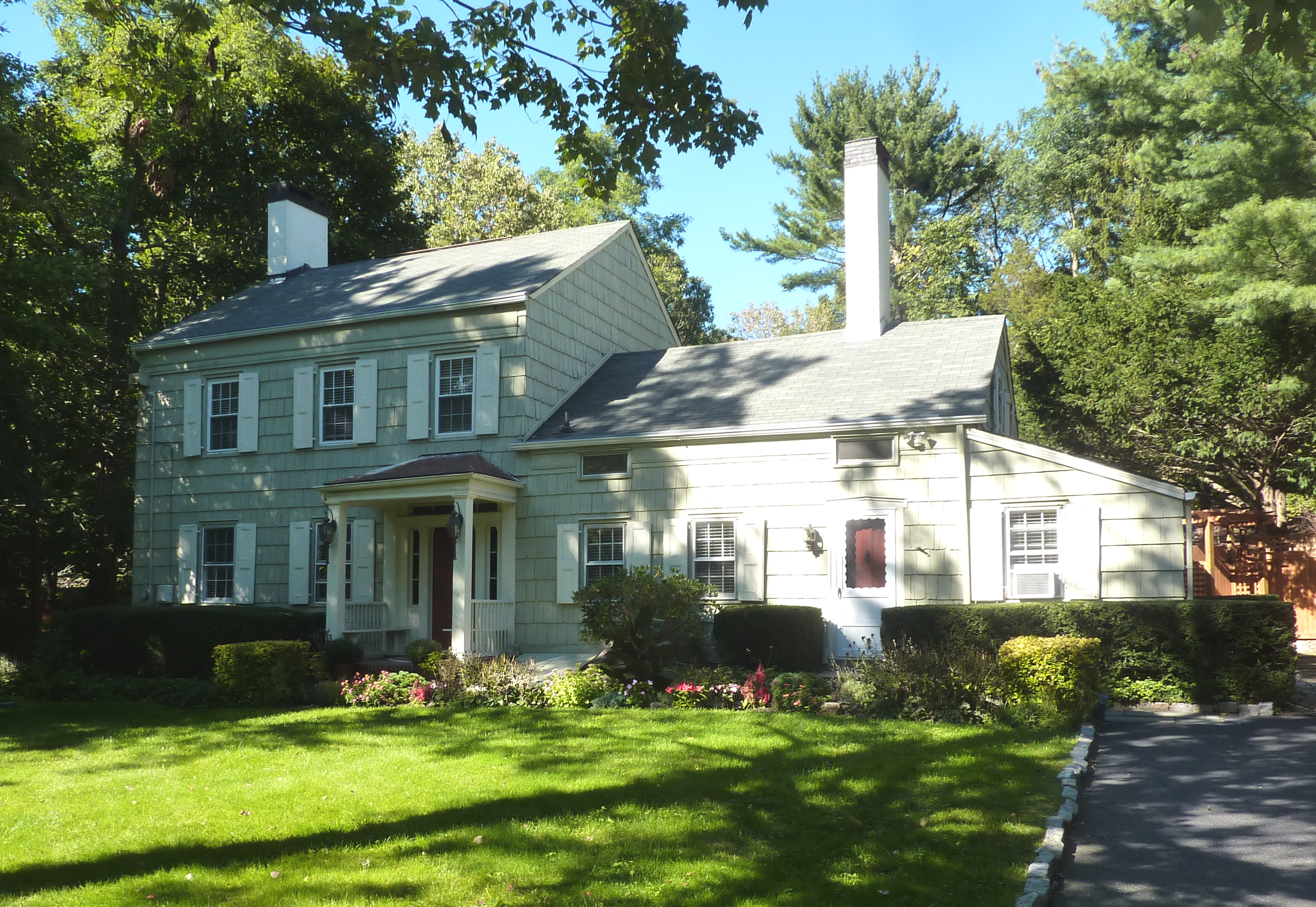

- Location within New York Location within the United States
- Location: 159 W. Rogues Path, Huntington, New York
- Coordinates: 40°50′16″N 73°26′38″W
- Area: 3 acres (1.2 ha)
- Built: c. 1800
- Architect: Buffett, Eliphas; Buffett, Elisha
- Architectural style: Greek Revival
- MPS: Huntington Town MRA
- NRHP reference No.: 85002495
- Added to NRHP: September 26, 1985

The Eliphas Buffett House is a historic house located at 159 West Rogues Path in Huntington, Suffolk County, New York.

== Description and history ==
It consists of a two-story, three-bay-wide main structure built in about 1835, with a one-story, three-bay-wide east wing built in about 1800. The 1835 main structure is representative of the Greek Revival style. It features two elongated decorative brick chimneys and gable dormers. It is a representative example of a large, upper-income single-family dwelling along Huntington's north shore. Also located on the property are a contributing barn and shed and the Buffett family cemetery.

It was added to the National Register of Historic Places on September 26, 1985.
