= Silvius =

Silvius or Sylvius may refer to:

== In fiction and mythology ==
- Alba Silvius, a Roman mythology king
- Aeneas Silvius, a mythological king
- Latinus Silvius, a mythological king
- Romulus Silvius, a mythological king
- Silvius (fictional character), a minor character in the pastoral comedy As You Like It
- Silvius (mythology), a king of Alba in Roman mythology
- Silvius Brabo, a mythical Roman soldier
- Tiberinus Silvius, a mythological king

== People (real) ==
- Sylvius of Toulouse (4th century), Gallo-Roman bishop of Toulouse and saint
- Francis Sylvius (1581-1649), Flemish Catholic theologian
- Franciscus Sylvius (1614-1672), Dutch scientist and physician
- Jacobus Sylvius (1478–1555), French anatomist
- Johan Sylvius (1620–1695), Swedish painter
- Sylvius Leopold Weiss (1687–1750), German composer and lutenist
- Silvius Condpan (d. 2011), Indian National Congress politician
- Silvius Magnago (1914–2010), retired Italian politician

== Other uses ==
- Silvius (fly), a genus of horsefly
