= Calpurnianus =

Calpurnianus is a surname. Notable people with the surname include:

- Decrius Calpurnianus (died 48 AD), Roman Eques
- Marcus Antius Crescens Calpurnianus (fl. late 1st to early 2nd century AD), Roman senator
- Marcus Pupius Piso Frugi Calpurnianus (died before 47 BC), Roman senator
