= Tonantius Ferreolus =

Tonantius Ferreolus may refer to:

- Tonantius Ferreolus (prefect)
- Tonantius Ferreolus (senator)
