= Pudens =

Pudens is a Roman cognomen meaning "modest", borne by a number of individuals, including:

- Aulus Pudens, a centurion and friend of the poet Martial
- Saint Pudens, an early Roman Christian mentioned in 2 Timothy in the New Testament
- Lucius Arrius Pudens, consul in 165
- Quintus Servilius Pudens, consul in 166
- Gaius Valerius Pudens, a Roman general of the 3rd century
