= Rogatus =

Rogatus was a Roman masculine given name, particularly common in Roman North Africa.

It may refer to:

- St Rogatus, one of the Martyrs of Abitinae (comm. Feb 12) during the Diocletianic Persecution
- Other SS Rogatus, martyrs commemorated on Jan 12, Mar 28, Aug 17, and Dec 1
- Rogatus or Rogas, father of Fabia Eudokia, wife of the emperor Heraclius
- Rogatus, father of St Paula in late antiquity
- Rogatus, bishop of Cartennae in late antiquity and founder of the Rogatist schism or heresy
- Rogatus, bishop of Parthenia in late antiquity
