= Mystacomyia =

Scientific classification
- Kingdom: Animalia
- Phylum: Arthropoda
- Class: Insecta
- Order: Diptera
- Family: Tachinidae
- Subfamily: Exoristinae
- Tribe: Masiphyini
- Genus: Mystacomyia; Giglio-Tos, 1893

Type species
- Mystacella rubriventris Wulp, 1890

Synonyms
- Milonius Reinhard, 1955

Genus of flies

Mystacomyia is a genus of flies in the family Tachinidae.

== Species ==
- Mystacomyia rubriventris (Wulp, 1890)
- Mystacomyia scordala (Reinhard, 1955)
