= Ianuaria =

Celtic goddess

Ianuaria is a Celtic goddess revered at the Burgundian sanctuary of Beire-le-chatel, a spring shrine at which images of Apollo, triple-horned bulls and doves were also dedicated. A small stone statuette from the temple depicts a young girl with curly hair, clad in a heavy-pleated coat and holding a set of pan-pipes. On the base of the statue is inscribed 'Deae Ianuariae'. Nothing else is known about this goddess. She may have been a healing goddess: the spring was a healing shrine, and it is known that Ianuaria's companion god Apollo was a healing god in both Celtic and Classical contexts. It is also possible that, since Apollo was a patron of music, and the goddess was depicted as holding panpipes, she was a goddess of music, which was perhaps perceived as a means of inducing the healing sleep.
