= Speratus =

Speratus was a Roman cognomen (surname), and may refer to:

- Speratus (??-180), principal spokesman of the Scillitan Martyrs
- Speratus, bishop of an English see and recipient of a letter from Alcuin of York of 797, possibly Unwona (bishop of Leicester).
- Paul Speratus (1484-1581), preacher and hymn writer during the Reformation.
