= Antiquus =

Canadian power metal band

- Origin: Vancouver, British Columbia, Canada
- Genres: Power metal Heavy metal Progressive Metal
- Years active: 2000–2011
- Label: Cruz Del Sur Music
- Past members: Andrew Bak; Scott Unger; Jesse White; Jeff Dormer; Dave Priban; Toshi Osawa; Geoff Way; Trev Leonard
- Website: https://www.facebook.com/Official.Antiquus.Site/

Antiquus (/æntikuːz/) was a Canadian power metal band from Vancouver, British Columbia. They combined different styles into a progressive power metal fusion. In their own words, "Far from the mainstream, Antiquus draws upon the roots of metal to create its signature sound - aggressive, melodic, intelligent. Clean, strong vocals and complex story-telling lyrics set against a sonic canvas of harmony guitars, edgy bass lines and punchy drumming."

The name Antiquus derives from the Latin word for 'ancient'. In an interview with Fast Forward Weekly, Antiquus member Andrew Bak stated, "We never decided to do one particular style of metal or take one particular approach. The songwriting and the sound we have really just came out of the chemistry, everything that we did was something that developed because of the personalities that we have and the level that we are at."

Antiquus opened for bands such as D.O.A,, Into Eternity and Sonata Arctica. Their albums were generally well received by reviewers, however fan recognition was low due to the general lack of popularity of the style in North America.

== History ==
=== Formation, Ramayana (2000–2005) ===
Antiquus formed in 2000, working to bring together a coherent group of musicians to produce their first album, Ramayana. The original members of the group, Andrew Bak, Jeff Dormer and Scott Unger, recruited vocalist Jesse White and, for second guitar, Dave Priban. Ramayana was released independently in 2004. Reviews were generally positive, with some critics saying that Ramayana was one of the best progressive metal albums to come out of Canada. Ramayana was a concept album, the bulk of the album retells the story of Ramayana, from ancient Hindu lore. A single song on the album told the story of the Battle of Eylau.

=== Eleutheria (2006–2010) ===
In 2005, Jeff Dormer and Dave Priban left the band and were replaced by guitarists Trev Leonard and Geoff Way. The band recorded their second album Eleutheria which was released in 2006 under the Italian label Cruz Del Sur. Eleutheria was recorded at Larry Anschell's Turtle Recording. Larry, who has produced for Alice in Chains, Pearl Jam and Soundgarden, mixed the album. It was mastered in Gothenburg, Sweden by Göran Finnberg (In Flames, Soilwork).

The album contains a concept story involving a captain of a vessel exploring and discovering new lands for his monarch king. Eleutheria is the Greek word for freedom, which is a theme within the album. This album was more easily associated with power metal, which allowed them to tour with popular power metal bands such as Sonata Arctica. Reviews stated the album took some time to absorb, due to the band's varying sound. The lyrics being especially important to the experience in this album, many reviewers enjoyed the album after developing an understanding of the story.

In 2008, Antiquus participated in the New wave of British heavy metal festival (NWOBHM) in Vancouver.

=== In the Land of the Blind (2011) ===
In 2009, Geoff Way left the band and was replaced by guitarist Toshi Osawa and Antiquus began to work on their third album, In the Land of the Blind. Cruz Del Sur dropped them during recording and, in 2011, they released the album independently. Most of its songs are connected to the stories of men who tried to assassinate US presidents such as Charles Guiteau or Samuel Byck. The songs portray these men as fostering erroneous delusions of grandeur, distortions of reality, feelings of alienation, and doubt towards capitalistic society. Considering the assassins to be ultimately forces of destruction, the overall message is a declaration of the harm, an essential fallacy, behind socialist and collectivist ideology.

In 2013, Antiquus recorded a cover of Iron Maiden's "Still Life" on the album Two Minutes To Midnight: A Millennium Tribute to Iron Maiden.

== Style and influences ==
"Colossus" (2011)
A clip from the first track on In the Land of the Blind illustrates Antiquus's style of play.

Antiquus didn't concern itself over incorporating popular characteristics of music into their sound. Their albums involve concept stories and incorporate many different styles of playing to develop the concept, including acoustic interludes, or instruments not normally present in metal such as the Sitar. In North America, classic heavy metal and melodic metal have been overshadowed by more extreme metal forms and Antiquus demonstrated that they can bring together less prominent styles of metal and build something new. The band was fond of the Iron Maiden, Black Sabbath, Queensrÿche, Dio, Fates Warning, Dream Theater, Yngwie J. Malmsteen, Nightwish. The influence of Iron Maiden is especially apparent in the singing of Jesse White, whose voice is often compared to Bruce Dickinson. Drummer Andrew Bak says "We borrowed a lot from Maiden; the harmonized leads, galloping bass lines, soaring vocals…" The themes of many of their lyrics bring the band closer to the style of Power Metal. The band defines their own genre as "Metal, with elements of Traditional, Power, Prog, Doom, Thrash and NWOBHM."

== Discography ==
- Ramayana (2005), Independent
- Eleutheria (2006), Cruz Del Sur Music
- In the Land of the Blind (2011), Independent
