= Amantius =

Amantius or Amancius may refer to several figures in Roman and early Christian history:

== Saints ==
- Amantius (died 120), martyred with Saint Getulius
- Amantius of Como (died 448), bishop, succeeded by Abundius

== Bishops ==
- Amantius of Rodez (400–440), a bishop of Rodez
- Amantius, archbishop of Reims (3rd century)
- Amantius, the first bishop of Nice (4th century)
- Amantius, bishop of Sisteron (9th century)
- Amantius, bishop of Saint-Paul-Trois-Châteaux

== Others ==
- Flavius Amantius, consul in 345
- Amantius (praepositus), Byzantine grand chamberlain
- Amantius (goldsmith) (died 571)
