= Certus Gearless Company =

Certus Gearless Company Ltd. was a British manufacturer of automobiles from 1907 to 1908 in London.

The company produced two models. The smaller model used a two-cylinder engine. The larger model was propelled by a 4-cylinder engine from Aster with a displacement of 3,000 cm³. The distinguishing feature of both models was the use of a friction drive. Few units were produced.
