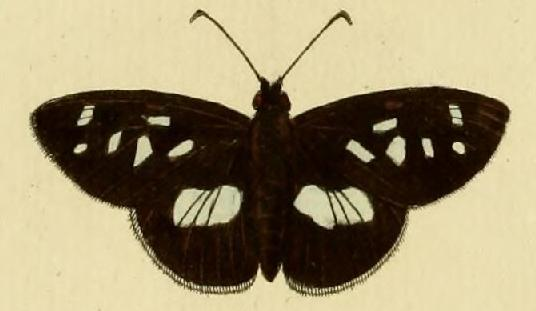

Scientific classification
- Kingdom: Animalia
- Phylum: Arthropoda
- Class: Insecta
- Order: Lepidoptera
- Family: Hesperiidae
- Genus: Carystus
- Species: C. phorcus

Binomial name
- Carystus phorcus (Cramer, 1777)

Synonyms
- Papilio phorcus Cramer, 1777; Hesperia marpesia Hewitson, 1868; Hesperia claudianus Latreille, [1824]

= Carystus phorcus =

Species of butterfly

Carystus phorcus is a species of butterfly in the family Hesperiidae. It is found in South America.

== Subspecies ==
- Carystus phorcus phorcus - Surinam, Brazil (Amazonas)
- Carystus phorcus claudianus (Latreille, [1824]) - Brazil
