= Adventus =

Adventus is the Latin word for arrival, and may mean

- Adventus (ceremony), the ceremony of an emperor's formal arrival at a city (usually, but not always, Rome)
  - Adventus (art), the artistic convention of depicting this ceremony
- The Latin word for the Christian season of Advent
- Quintus Antistius Adventus, Roman governor of Britain
- Adventus Saxonum, the traditional date for the arrival of the Saxons in Britain in 449
