= Solus =

Solus may refer to:

- Solus or Soluntum, an ancient city of Sicily
- Solus (comics), an American comic book series
- Solus (operating system), an operating system based on the Linux kernel
- Solus (moth), a genus of moths in the family Saturniidae
- Solus (typeface), a serif typeface
- Solus, Western Australia, a locality in Western Australia
- McLaren Solus GT, a sports car
