= Antias =

Antias, a name derived from the Roman colony of Antium, may refer to:

- Anteias or Antias, mythological founder of Antium
- Lucius Valerius Antias, Roman general
- Valerius Antias, Roman annalist
