= Lucilianus =

Lucilianus or Lucillianus may refer to:

- Lucilianus, a Coptic saint
- Lucillianus (fleet commander)
- Lucillianus (magister equitum), father-in-law of the Roman emperor Jovian
- Egnatius Lucillianus, Roman governor of Britannia Inferior in the 3rd century AD
