= Quintilianus =

Quintilianus may refer to:

- Aristides Quintilianus (3rd century), Greek writer
- Marcus Fabius Quintilianus (c. 35–c. 100), usually referred to as Quintilian, Roman rhetorician
