= Liberius =

Liberius may refer to:

- Liberius of Ravenna (d. 200), Bishop of Ravenna and saint
- Pope Liberius (died 366), Bishop of Rome
- Liberius (praetorian prefect) (c. 465 – c. 554), Roman government administrator
- Oliver of Ancona or Liberius (died c. 1050), immigrant religious leader in Italy
- Liberius, a character in Doctor Zhivago

== See also ==
- Liberalis (disambiguation)
