= Simplicius =

Simplicius may refer to:

Persons

- Pope Simplicius (d. 483 AD)
- Simplicius of Cilicia (d. c. 560 AD), philosopher
- Saint Simplicius, legendary 'founding' bishop of the Sardinian Diocese of Civita
- Simplicius, Constantius and Victorinus (fl. 2nd century), Roman martyrs and saints
- Simplicius, Faustinus and Beatrix (d. 302 or 303 AD), Roman martyrs and saints

Art and fiction

- Simplicius Simplicissimus, a picaresque novel about the character of the same name
- Simplicius (operetta), an operetta by Johann Strauss II
- A character in Dialogue Concerning the Two Chief World Systems, a 1632 work by Galileo
