= Lupicinus =

Lupicinus may refer to:

- Lupicinus (magister equitum), consul 367
- Lupicinus (comes per Thracias), commander in the Gothic Wars 367/377
- Lupicinus of Lyon, archbishop of Lyon, 491–494
- Lupicinus of Condat, abbot and saint, 5th century
- Flavius Licerius Firminus Lupicinus, Gallo-Roman scholar of the 6th century
