= Vibulanus =

Vibulanus is a Roman cognomen. Notable people with the cognomen include:

- Caeso Fabius Vibulanus, Roman consul in 484, 481 and 479 BC
- Marcus Fabius Vibulanus (consul 483 BC), Roman consul
- Marcus Fabius Vibulanus (consul 442 BC), Roman consul
- Numerius Fabius Vibulanus (fl. c. 421–407 BC), Roman senator
- Quintus Fabius Vibulanus (consul 485 BC), Roman consul
- Quintus Fabius Vibulanus (consul 467 BC), Roman consul
- Quintus Fabius Vibulanus (consul 423 BC), Roman consul
