= Bassianus =

Bassianus may refer to:

- Caracalla (Lucius Septimius Bassianus, 188–217), Roman Emperor
- Julius Bassianus (died 217), Emesene High Priest
- Marcus Julius Gessius Bassianus (fl. 212–217), Roman priest during the reign of Caracalla
- Elagabalus (Varius Avitus Bassianus, c. 203–222), Roman Emperor
- Bassianus (executed by Constantine) (died 316), senator executed by Constantine the Great
- Saint Bassianus of Lodi (c. 320 – c. 409), bishop of Lodi, Italy
- Bassianus (bishop) (fl. 444–451), bishop of Ephesus
- Joannes Bassianus (12th century), Italian jurist
- Bassianus, son of the late Emperor of Rome, a character in William Shakespeare's play Titus Andronicus
