= Rufus (Roman cognomen) =

Rufus (/ˈruːfəs/) is one of the most common of the ancient Roman cognomina. It may refer to:

- Quintus Marcius Rufus, an officer of Marcus Licinius Crassus during the Third Servile War in 71 BC
- Annius Rufus, Prefect of Judea in 12 AD
- Calvisius Rufus, governor of Britain in the 3rd century AD
- Curtius Rufus, 1st-century Roman politician (possibly the same as Quintus Curtius Rufus)
- Faenius Rufus (died 65), Roman senator and praefectus annonae, 55–62 AD
- Gaius Asinius Rufus (c. 110–after 136), Roman Senator
- Lucius Passienus Rufus, consul in 4 BC
- Lucius Varius Rufus, poet of the 1st century BC
- Lucius Vibullius Rufus, 1st- and 2nd-century Greek aristocrat
- Lucius Virginius Rufus, politician and general of the 1st century
- Marcus Caelius Rufus, politician of the 1st century BC
- Marcus Cluvius Rufus, 1st-century consul, senator, governor, and historian
- Marcus Junius Rufus, 1st-century Roman politician
- Marcus Minucius Rufus (consul 221 BC)
- Marcus Valerius Messalla Rufus (c. 104/3–26 BC), Roman politician, and consul in 53 BC
- Musonius Rufus, Roman Stoic philosopher of the 1st century
- Publius Aelius Vibullius Rufus, 2nd-century Greek aristocrat
- Publius Rutilius Rufus, politician, general and historian of the 2nd century BC
- Publius Sulpicius Rufus, politician and general of the 2nd century BC
- Quintus Minucius Rufus, 2nd- and 3rd-century BC Roman politician and consul in 197 BC
- Quintus Pompeius Rufus (consul 88 BC) (died 88 BC), Roman politician
- Quintus Tineius Rufus (consul 127) (c. 90–after 132 AD), Roman politician
- Quintus Tineius Rufus (consul 182), Roman politician
- Quintus Curtius Rufus, historian likely active in the 1st century
- Rufus (consul 457), consul in 457 AD
- Quintus Salvidienus Rufus, 1st-century BC Roman general
- Servius Sulpicius Rufus, orator of the 1st century BC
- Valgius Rufus, poet of the 1st century BC
