= Esquilinus =

Esquilinus may refer to:

== People ==
- Quintus Minucius Esquilinus (fl. c. 457 BC), Roman politician
- Lucius Sergius Esquilinus, Roman politician
- Lucius Verginius Tricostus Esquilinus, Roman politician
- Opiter Verginius Tricostus Esquilinus (consul 478 BC), Roman consul
- Lucius Minucius Esquilinus Augurinus, Roman politician

== Other uses ==
- Esquiline Hill (Latin: Collis Esquilinus), one of the Seven Hills of Rome
- Campus Esquilinus, area on the Esquiline Hill
