= Hermias =

Hermias (/hɜːrˈmaɪəs/; Ancient Greek: Ἑρμείας, Hermeias or Ἑρμίας, Hermias) is the name of:

- Hermias of Atarneus (/ˈhɜːrmiəs/) (4th century BC), tyrant of Atarneus
- Hermeias (3rd century BC), the minister of Seleucus III Ceraunus
- Saint Hermias of Comana (2nd century AD), an early saint and martyr of the Eastern Orthodox Church
- Hermias (apologist) (3rd century?), a Christian apologist
- Hermias (philosopher) (5th century), Neoplatonist
