= Pompeianus =

Pompeianus may refer to:

- Tiberius Claudius Pompeianus Quintianus, son of Syrian Roman consul Tiberius Claudius Pompeianus
- Tiberius Claudius Pompeianus, Roman general of emperor Marcus Aurelius.
- Ruricius Pompeianus, Praetorian prefect
- Lucius Aurelius Commodus Pompeianus, son of Tiberius Claudius Pompeianus Quintianus; Roman consul in 209
- Lucius Tiberius Claudius Pompeianus, son of Lucius Aurelius Commodus Pompeianus; Roman consul in 236
- Gabinius Barbarus Pompeianus, fifth-century praefectus urbi
