= Tranquillinus =

Tranquillinus can refer to:

- Tranquillinus, bishop of Tarragona (6th century).
- Saint Tranquillinus, father of Saints Mark and Marcellian (3rd century)
