= Murena =

Murena may refer to:

== Comic ==
- Murena (comic book), Belgian comic book

== Persons ==
- Carlo Murena (1713–1764), Italian architect of the late-Baroque period active in Rome, Foligno, Perugia, and other towns in central Italy.
- Lucius Licinius Murena (praetor 88 BC), Roman senator
- Lucius Licinius Murena (consul), Roman senator
- Aulus Terentius Varro Murena, Roman senator
- Tony Muréna, (1917 – 1970) was an Italian-born Musette accordionist and jazz composer who lived and worked in France.

== Technology ==
- Matra Murena, a mid-engined, rear wheel drive sports car that was produced from 1980 through 1983 by the French engineering group Matra
- Murena Retail SAS, a company known for their /e/ (operating system) partnerships

== See also ==
- Muraena, a genus of eels
