= Largus =

Largus may refer to:

- Scribonius Largus, Roman physician and writer
- Saint Largus, Christian martyr of the Roman era, associated with Cyriacus
- Largus (bug), a "true bug" genus
- Lada Largus, a rebadged Dacia Logan automobile
