= Avienus =

Avienus may refer to:

- Gennadius Avienus (fl. 450–460s), Roman politician
- Avienus (consul 501), Roman politician
- Rufius Magnus Faustus Avienus (consul 502), Roman politician
- Avienius, commonly (mis)spelled Avienus

== See also ==
- Aviena gens, ancient Roman family
- Avianus, also spelled Avienus
