= Serapio =

Serapio may refer to:

== Ancient history ==
- Publius Cornelius Scipio Nasica Serapio (182/181–132 BC), Ancient Roman politician

== Modern history ==
=== Surname ===
- Antonio Serapio, Philippine lawmaker
- Kevin Serapio, Nicaraguan football player

=== Given name ===
- José Serapio Palimino Gomez, better known as "Pepper Gomez", American wrestler and bodybuilder
- Serapio Bwemi Magambo, Ugandan priest
- Serapio Calderón, Peruvian interim president
- Serapio Reyes Ortiz, ninth Vice-President of Bolivia
- Serapio Rukundo, Ugandan politician

== See also ==
- Serapion (disambiguation)
- Seraphin (disambiguation)
