= Candidianus =

Candidianus may refer to:

- Candidianus (son of Galerius), 4th century-son of the Roman Emperor Galerius and adopted son of Galeria Valeria
- Candidianus (Patriarch of Aquileia), Patriarch of Grado, 606-612
