= Catullinus =

Catullinus is a name. Notable people with the name include:

- Quintus Fabius Catullinus, Hispano-Roman politician
- Aconius Catullinus Philomatius (fl. 338–349 AD), Roman senator
