= Audax =

Audax is a Latin adjective meaning "bold, daring" and may refer to:

== Media ==
- Audax Groep, a Dutch media and retail company

== Sport ==
=== Cycling ===
- Audax (cycling), long-distance endurance bicycle rides
- Audax Australia, an organisation that runs long distance randonnee cycling events in Australia and New Zealand
- Audax UK, British cycling club that oversees long-distance cycling in the United Kingdom

=== Football ===
- Audax Italiano, a Chilean football club based in the city of Santiago
- Audax Rio de Janeiro Esporte Clube, a Brazilian football club based in the city of São João de Meriti
- Grêmio Osasco Audax Esporte Clube, a Brazilian football club based in the city of São Paulo

== Transport ==
- Hawker Audax, British, 1930s military aircraft
- Rootes Audax, a family of cars made by the British Rootes Group

== People ==
- Audax, one of the assassins of the Lusitanian leader Viriathus during the Roman Conquest of Hispania: see Audax, Ditalcus and Minurus
- St. Audax, a 3rd-century saint who was supposedly martyred with Victoria and Anatolia
- Audax, an archbishop of Tarragona (Spain) c. 633 who assisted to the Fourth Council of Toledo
- Audax Minor (1887–1979), racing columnist for The New Yorker
- Audax (grammarian), a grammarian of the 5th/6th centuries

== Companies ==
Audax, listed energy company based in Spain
