= Latro =

Latro may refer to:

- Marcus Porcius Latro (died 4 BC), a Roman rhetorician
- Latro of Laon (c. 499 AD—570 AD), saint and bishop
- Latro, protagonist of Gene Wolfe's novel Soldier of the Mist and its sequels

== See also ==
- Latrocinium, a war not preceded by a formal declaration of war as understood in Roman law
