= Tubero =

Tubero may refer to:

- Lucius Aelius Tubero, 1st-century BC Roman politician and writer
- Lucius Seius Tubero, Roman senator, consul in 18
- Quintus Aelius Tubero (consul) (fl. 17–11 BC), Roman senator, consul in 11 BC
- Quintus Aelius Tubero (historian), mid-1st century BC Roman jurist and historian
- Quintus Aelius Tubero (Stoic), Roman Stoic philosopher, possibly a tribune of the plebs in 130 BC and possibly a consul in 118 BC
- Ludovicus Tubero (1459–1527), historian from Ragusa
- Tubero (band), Filipino grindcore band from Quezon City, Philippines, formed in 2008
