= Verax =

Verax may refer to:

== People ==
- Verax, self-assigned code name of Edward Snowden (born 1983)
- Verax, pseudonym of Henry Dunckley (1823–1896)
- Theodorus Verax, pseudonym of Clement Walker (died 1651)

== Science ==
- Bucculatrix Verax, a leaf miner
- Marasmarcha verax, a moth

== Other ==
- SS Verax, an Italian cargo ship in service 1951–60
- "Rector Potens, Verax Deus", a hymn
- Verax (film), a 2013 short film about Edward Snowden
