= Mamertinus =

Mamertinus may refer to:

- Marcus Petronius Sura Mamertinus, consul 182 AD
- Marcus Petronius Mamertinus, suffect consul 150 AD
- Claudius Mamertinus, consul 362 AD
- Mamertinus of Auxerre (d. ca. 462 AD), an abbot and saint
- Carcer Mamertinus, a jail at the foot of the Capitol in Rome, supposed to have been built by Ancus Marcius
