= Lateranus (cognomen) =

Lateranus is an ancient Roman cognomen. Notable people with this cognomen include:

- Plautius Lateranus (executed AD 65), Roman senator
- Lucius Sextius Lateranus, Roman tribune of the plebs
- Titus Sextius Lateranus, Roman senator
- Titus Sextius Magius Lateranus (consul 94), Roman senator
- Titus Sextius Magius Lateranus (consul 197), Roman senator
