= Nazarius =

- Nazarius (rhetorician) (4th century CE), Latin rhetorician
- Saint Nazarius (Roman Martyrology) (died c. 303 CE), one of four Roman martyrs who suffered death under Diocletian
- Saint Nazarius (abbot), the fourteenth abbot of the monastery of Lérins, probably during the reign of the Merovingian Clotaire II (584–629)
- Saint Nazarius (bishop), the legendary first bishop of Koper, Istria
- Nazarius and Celsus, two 1st century CE martyrs whose bodies were discovered by Saint Ambrose shortly after 395 CE
- John Paul Nazarius (1556–1645), Italian Dominican theologian
