= Gallicanus I =

Gallicanus I was the seventh bishop of Embrun. He was represented at the Fourth Council of Arles in 524, assisted in person at that of Carpentras in 527 (where he subscribed to the canons in order of seniority), and attended the Third Council of Vaison in 529. He was perhaps also at the Second Council of Orange in the same year. The councils of 524–29 were presided over by Caesarius of Arles.

== Sources ==
- Klingshirn, William E. Caesarius of Arles: The Making of a Christian Community in Late Antique Gaul. Cambridge University Press, 1994.
