= Lupercus =

Lupercus may refer to:

- Lupercus (mythology), a god in Roman mythology
- Lupercus of Berytus, a Greek grammarian
- Mummius Lupercus, member of the Mummia gens
- Saint Lupercus, one of two Roman Catholic saints
  - Luperculus, also known as Lupercus, Roman Catholic saint
  - Marcellus of Tangier#Claudius, Lupercus, Victorius, another Roman Catholic saint
