= Denise, Dativa, Leontia, Tertius, Emilianus, Boniface, Majoricus, and Servus =

Christian martyrs

Saints Denise, Dativa, Leontia, Tertius, Emilianus, Boniface, Majoricus, and Servus
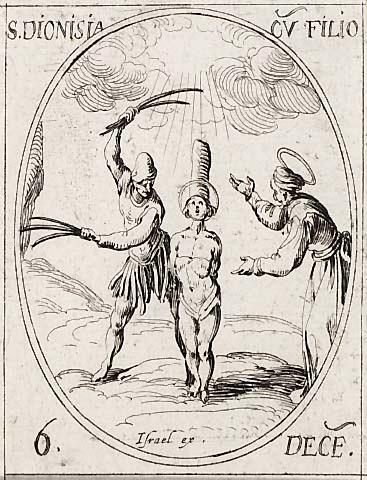
- Saint Denise and Her Son (Denise and Majoricus), Jacques Callot, 1630s.

Martyrs
- Born: Unknown
- Died: c. 484 AD; Proconsular Africa
- Venerated in: Roman Catholic Church
- Canonized: Pre-Congregation
- Feast: December 6
- Attributes: Martyr's palm Crown of martyrdom
- Patronage: Persecuted Christians

Denise (Dionysia, Dionisia), Dativa, Leontia, Tertius, Emilianus, Boniface, Majoricus, and Servus are venerated as martyrs by the Catholic Church. They were killed in the late 5th century during the persecution of Trinitarian Christians in Proconsular Africa by the Arian Vandals, according to Victor of Vita. These martyrs were killed during the reign of Arian king Hunneric.

According to Victor, Denise was a beautiful and widowed noblewoman, who was killed during this persecution. Denise's son Majoricus was killed during the same persecution, as well as Denise's sister Dativa. Denise was brutally whipped by the authorities. and then died at the stake with her little child, Majoricus, and her sister Dativa.

Also killed were Leontia, daughter of Bishop Germanus of Perada (Paradana); a doctor named Emilius or Emelius ("Emilianus" according to Usuard), brother-in-law of Dativa; Tertius, a monk of Byzacena; and Boniface, surnamed Sibidense, who has been identified as Boniface, bishop of Sicilibba in Proconsular Africa. Emilius and Tertius were flayed alive.

Two other figures associated with the same persecution were venerated on the same feast day: Servus or Servius, who was martyred at Tuburbium; and Victoria or Victrix, who was tortured at Cucusa (Colusitana, Culcitana).

Servus was hung and dropped from ropes and then dragged through the streets, while Victoria was hung from the wrists above a fire. Victoria's husband begged her to abjure her faith and to think of her young children but she refused. Thinking her dead, the authorities left her on the ground. According to the legend, Victoria later recovered and stated that she had been miraculously cured by a young maiden.

== Veneration ==
Their cult was mentioned in the martyrologies of various ancient churches and in the martyrologies associated with Ado, Florus, and Usuard. The Legendarium associated with the convent of the canons regular at Böddeken records their legend in a codex dating from the 15th century (Biblioteca Teodoriana, Paderborn). The Roman Martyrology commemorates their feast day on December 6, although Servius’ name is recorded on December 7, and Victoria's name is completely left out. There was a cult in the late Middle Ages devoted only to Emilianus, which was popular especially in Naples, and at the end of the 14th century, he was chosen as the patron for a local society of pharmacists along with Peregrine of Auxerre. A church was built in Emilianus’ honor at Naples.
