= Late Latin =

Written Latin of late antiquity

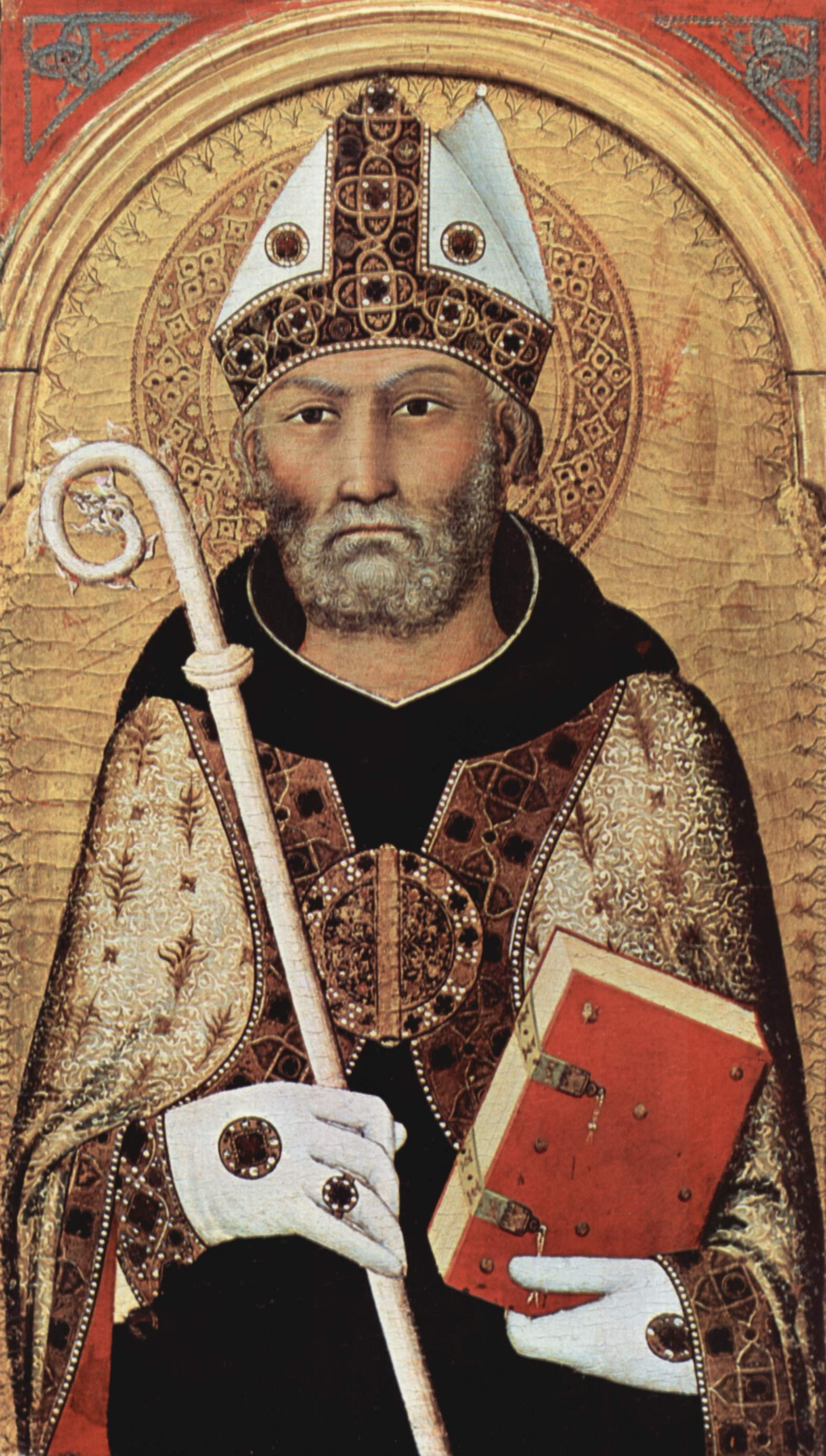
- Augustine of Hippo (354–430), Late Latin author
- Native to: (Western) Roman Empire, Ostrogothic Kingdom, Gallic Empire
- Region: Mare Nostrum region
- Era: 3rd–6th centuries; developed into Medieval Latin
- Language family: Indo-European: Italic; Latino-Faliscan; Latin; Late Latin
- Early forms: Old Latin: Classical Latin
- Writing system: Latin

Official status
- Official language in: Both Roman Empires (Later replaced with Koine Greek in the East)
- Regulated by: Schools of grammar and rhetoric

Language codes
- ISO 639-3: –
- Glottolog: late1252
- The Late-Latin speaking world, 271 CE

Late Latin is the scholarly name for the form of written Latin of late antiquity. English dictionary definitions of Late Latin date this period from the 3rd to 6th centuries CE, and continuing into the 7th century in the Iberian Peninsula. This somewhat ambiguously defined version of Latin was used between the eras of Classical Latin and Medieval Latin. Scholars do not agree exactly when Classical Latin should end or Medieval Latin should begin.

Being a written language, Late Latin is not the same as Vulgar Latin, or more specifically, the spoken Latin of the post-Imperial period. The latter is the ancestor of the Romance languages. Although Late Latin reflects an upsurge in the use of Vulgar Latin vocabulary and constructs, it remains largely classical in its overall features, depending on the author who uses it. Some Late Latin writings are more literary and classical, but others are more inclined to the vernacular. As such it is an important source of information about changes in the spoken language, while not being a simple replication of the state of the oral language at the time. Also, Late Latin is not identical to Christian patristic Latin, used in the theological writings of the early Christian fathers. While Christian writings used a subset of Late Latin, pagans, such as Ammianus Marcellinus or Macrobius, also wrote extensively in Late Latin, especially in the early part of the period.

Late Latin formed when large numbers of non-Latin-speaking peoples on the borders of the empire were being subsumed and assimilated, and the rise of Christianity was introducing a heightened divisiveness in Roman society, creating a greater need for a standard language for communicating between different socioeconomic registers and widely separated regions of the sprawling empire. A new and more universal speech evolved from the main elements: Classical Latin, Christian Latin, which featured sermo humilis (ordinary speech) in which the people were to be addressed, and all the various dialects of Vulgar Latin.

The linguist Antoine Meillet wrote:

"Without the exterior appearance of the language being much modified, Latin became in the course of the imperial epoch a new language... Serving as some sort of lingua franca to a large empire, Latin tended to become simpler, to keep above all what it had of the ordinary."

== Philological constructs ==
=== Late and post-classical Latin ===
The origin of the term 'Late Latin' remains obscure. A notice in Harper's New Monthly Magazine of the publication of Andrews' Freund's Lexicon of the Latin Language in 1850 mentions that the dictionary divides Latin into ante-classic, quite classic, Ciceronian, Augustan, post-Augustan and post-classic or late Latin, which indicates the term already was in professional use by English classicists in the early 19th century. Instances of English vernacular use of the term may also be found from the 18th century. The term Late Antiquity meaning post-classical and pre-medieval had currency in English well before then.

=== Imperial Latin ===
Wilhelm Siegmund Teuffel's first edition (1870) of History of Roman Literature defined an early period, the Golden Age, the Silver Age and then goes on to define other ages first by dynasty and then by century (see under Classical Latin). In subsequent editions he subsumed all periods under three headings: the First Period (Old Latin), the Second Period (the Golden Age) and the Third Period, "the Imperial Age", subdivided into the Silver Age, the 2nd century, and the 3rd–6th centuries together, which was a recognition of Late Latin, as he sometimes refers to the writings of those times as "late". Imperial Latin went on into English literature; Fowler's History of Roman Literature mentions it in 1903.

The beginning and end of Imperial Latin are not well defined. Politically, the excluded Augustan Period is the paradigm of imperiality, but the style cannot be grouped with either the Silver Age or Late Latin. In 6th-century Italy, the Western Roman Empire no longer existed and the rule of Gothic kings prevailed. Subsequently, the term Imperial Latin was dropped by historians of Latin literature, although it may be seen in marginal works. The Silver Age was extended a century, and the four centuries following made use of Late Latin.

=== Low Latin ===
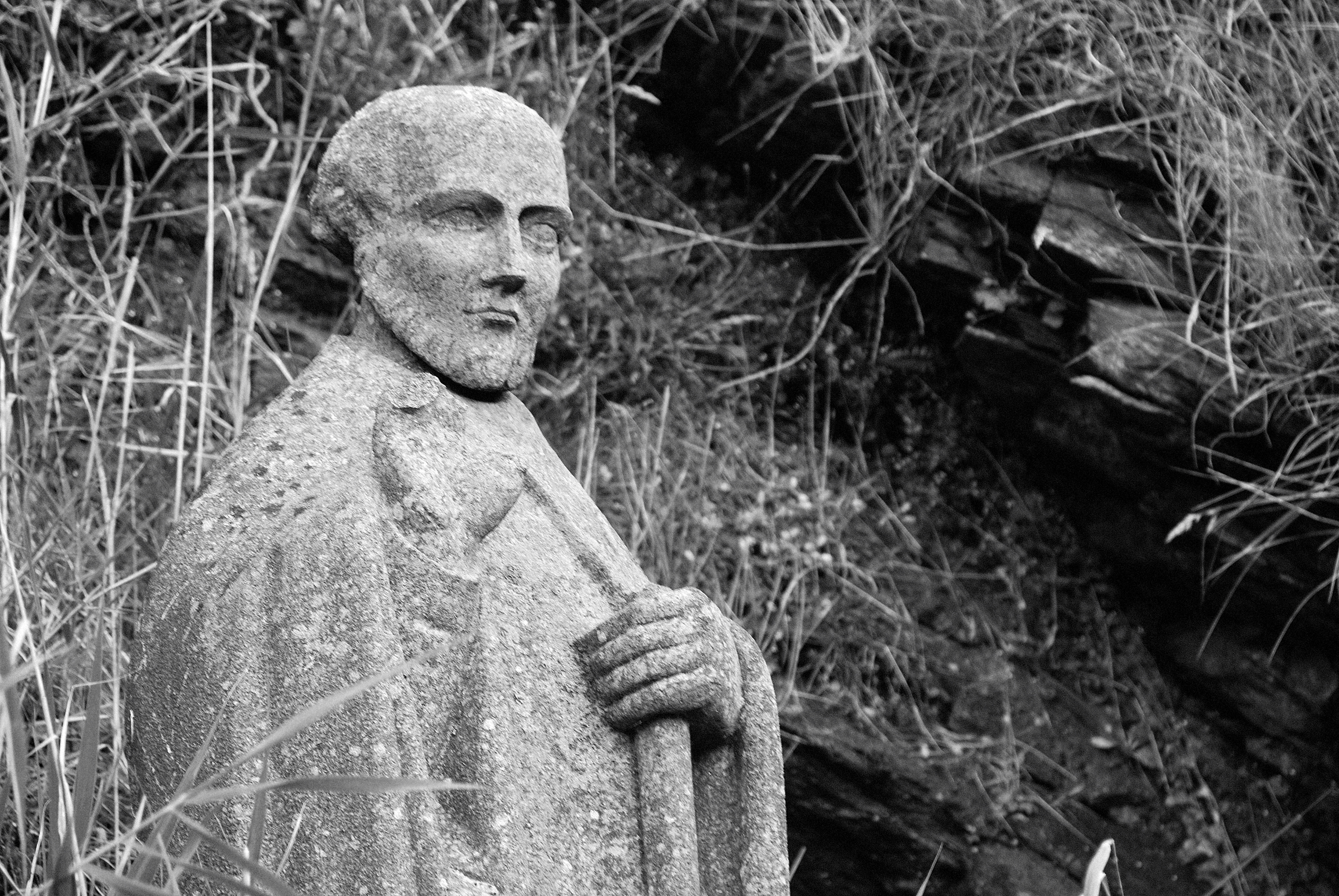
St. Gildas, one of a number of Late Latin writers to promulgate an excidium or ruina Britanniae because of moral turpitude

Low Latin is a vague and often pejorative term that might refer to any post-classical Latin from Late Latin through Renaissance Latin, depending on the author. Its origins are obscure, but the Latin expression media et infima Latinitas sprang into public notice in 1678 in the title of a Glossary (by today's standards a dictionary) by Charles du Fresne, sieur du Cange. The multivolume set had many editions and expansions by other authors subsequently. The title varies somewhat; the most commonly used was Glossarium Mediae et Infimae Latinitatis. It has been translated by expressions of widely different meanings. The uncertainty is understanding what media, "middle", and infima, "low", mean in this context.

The term media is securely connected to Medieval Latin by du Cange's terminology expounded in the Praefatio, such as scriptores mediae aetatis, "writers of the middle age". Du Cange's Glossary takes words from authors ranging from the Christian period (Late Latin) to the Renaissance, dipping into the classical period if a word originated there. Either media et infima Latinitas refers to one age, which must be the middle age covering the entire post-classical range, or it refers to two consecutive periods, infima Latinitas and media Latinitas. Both interpretations have their adherents.

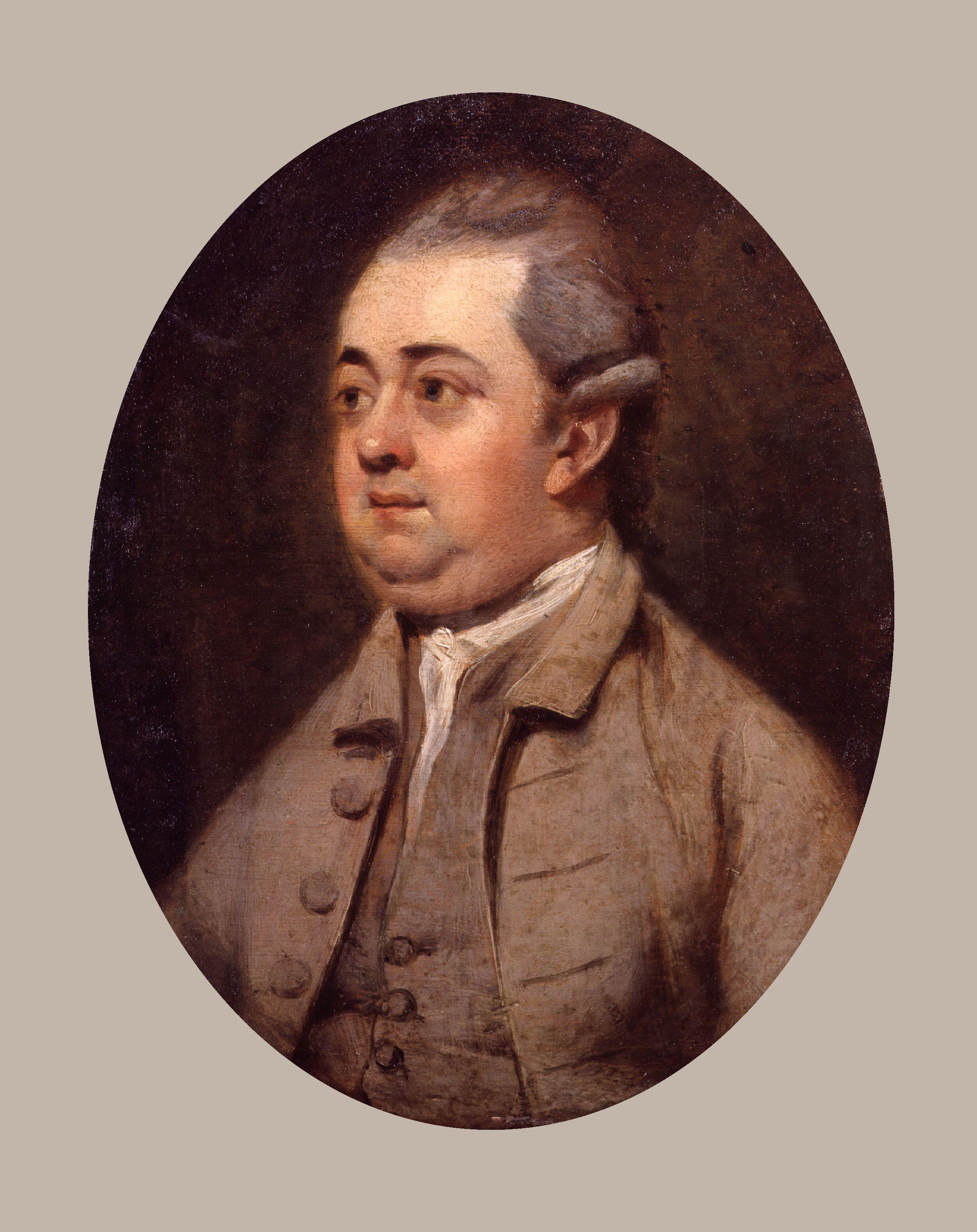
Edward Gibbon, English historian who espoused the concept of a decline of the Roman Empire resulting in its fall

In the former case, the infimae appears extraneous; it recognizes the corruptio of the corrupta Latinitas which du Cange said his Glossary covered. The two-period case postulates a second unity of style, infima Latinitas, translated into English as "Low Latin" (which in the one-period case would be identical to media Latinitas). Du Cange in the glossarial part of his Glossary identifies some words as being used by purioris Latinitatis scriptores, such as Cicero (of the Golden Age). He has already said in the Preface that he rejects the ages scheme used by some: Golden Age, Silver Age, Brass Age, Iron Age. A second category is the inferioris Latinitatis scriptores, such as Apuleius (Silver Age). The third and main category is the infimae Latinitatis scriptores, which must be post-classical; that is, Late Latin, unless they are also medieval. His failure to state which authors are low leaves the issue unresolved.

He does, however, give some idea of the source of his infima, which is a classical word, "lowest", of which the comparative degree is inferior, "lower". In the preface, he opposes the style of the scriptores aevi inferioris (Silver Age) to the elegantes sermones, "elegant speech", the high and low styles of Latinitas defined by the classical authors. Du Cange was basing his low style on sermo humilis, the simplified speech devised by Late Latin Christian writers to address ordinary people. Humilis (humble, humility) means "low", "of the ground". The Christian writers were not interested in the elegant speech of the best or classical Latin, which belonged to their aristocratic pagan opponents. Instead, they preferred a humbler style lower in correctness, so that they might better deliver the gospel to the vulgus or "common people".

Low Latin in this view is the Latin of the two periods in which it has the least degree of purity, or is most corrupt. By corrupt, du Cange only meant that the language had resorted to nonclassical vocabulary and constructs from various sources, but his choice of words was unfortunate. It allowed the "corruption" to extend to other aspects of society, providing fuel for the fires of religious (Catholic vs. Protestant) and class (conservative vs. revolutionary) conflict. Low Latin passed from the heirs of the Italian Renaissance to the new philologists of the northern and Germanic climes, where it became a different concept.

In Britain, Gildas' view that Britain fell to the Anglo-Saxons because it was morally slack was already well known to the scholarly world. The northern Protestants now worked a role reversal; if the language was "corrupt", it must be symptomatic of a corrupt society, which indubitably led to a "decline and fall", as Edward Gibbon put it, of imperial society. Writers taking this line relied heavily on the scandalous behavior of the Julio-Claudian dynasty and the bad emperors reported by Tacitus and other writers and later by the secret history of Procopius, who hated his royal employers to such a degree that he could not contain himself about their real methods and way of life any longer. They, however, spoke elegant Latin. The Protestants changed the scenario to fit their ideology that the church needed to be purified of corruption. For example, Baron Bielfeld, a Prussian officer and comparative Latinist, characterised the low in Low Latin, which he saw as medieval Latin, as follows:

The fourth age of the Latin tongue is that of the remainder of the middle age, and the 1st centuries of modern times, during which the language fell by degrees into so great a decadency, that it became nothing better than a barbarous jargon. It is the style of these times that is given the name of Low Latin.... What indeed could be expected from this language, at a time when the barbarians had taken possession of Europe, but especially of Italy; when the empire of the east was governed by idiots; when there was a total corruption of morals; when the priests and monks were the only men of letters, and were at the same time the most ignorant and futile mortals in the world. Under these times of darkness, we must, therefore, rank that Latin, which is called lingua ecclesiastica, and which we cannot read without disgust.

As 'Low Latin' tends to be muddled with Vulgar Latin, Late Latin, and Medieval Latin, and has unfortunate extensions of meaning into the sphere of socio-economics, it has gone out of use by the mainstream philologists of Latin literature. A few writers on the periphery still mention it, influenced by the dictionaries and classic writings of former times.

As Teuffel's scheme of the Golden Age and the Silver Age is the generally accepted one, the canonical list of authors should begin just after the end of the Silver Age, regardless of what 3rd-century event is cited as the beginning; otherwise there are gaps. Teuffel gave the end of the Silver Age as the death of Hadrian in 138 CE. His classification of styles left a century between that event and his final period, the 3rd–6th centuries CE, which was in other systems considered Late Antiquity.

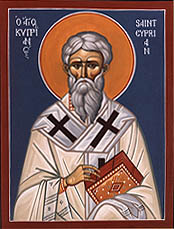
Cyprian

Starting with Charles Thomas Crutwell's A History of Roman Literature from the Earliest Period to the Death of Marcus Aurelius, which first came out in 1877, English literary historians have included the spare century in Silver Latin. Accordingly, the latter ends with the death of the last of the five good emperors in 180 CE. Other authors use other events, such as the end of the Nervan–Antonine dynasty in 192 CE or later events. A good round date of 200 CE gives a canonical list of nearly no overlap.

The transition between Late Latin and Medieval Latin is by no means as easy to assess. Taking that media et infima Latinitas was one style, Mantello in a recent handbook asserts of "the Latin used in the middle ages" that it is "here interpreted broadly to include late antiquity and therefore to extend from c. AD 200 to 1500." Although recognizing "late antiquity" he does not recognize Late Latin. It did not exist and Medieval Latin began directly from 200 CE. In this view, all differences from Classical Latin are bundled as though they evolved through a single continuous style.

Of the two-style interpretations the Late Latin period of Erich Auerbach and others is one of the shortest: "In the first half of the 6th century, which witnessed the beginning and end of Ostrogoth rule in Italy, Latin literature becomes medieval. Boethius was the last 'ancient' author and the role of Rome as the center of the ancient world, as communis patria, was at an end." In essence, the lingua franca of classical vestiges was doomed when Italy was overrun by the Goths, but its momentum carried it one lifetime further, ending with the death of Boethius in 524 CE.

Not everyone agrees that the lingua franca came to an end with the fall of Rome, but argue that it continued and became the language of the reinstituted Carolingian Empire (predecessor of the Holy Roman Empire) under Charlemagne. Toward the end of his reign, his administration conducted some language reforms. The first recognition that Late Latin could not be understood by the masses and therefore was not a lingua franca was the decrees of 813 CE by synods at Mainz, Rheims and Tours that from then on preaching was to be done in a language more understandable to the people, which was started by Tours Canon 17 as Rustica Romana lingua, identified as Romance, the descendant of Vulgar Latin. Late Latin as defined by Meillet was at an end; however, Pucci's Harrington's Mediaeval Latin sets the end of Late Latin when Romance began to be written, "Latin retired to the cloister" and "Romanitas lived on only in the fiction of the Holy Roman Empire." The final date given by those authors is 900 CE.

=== Through the death of Boethius ===
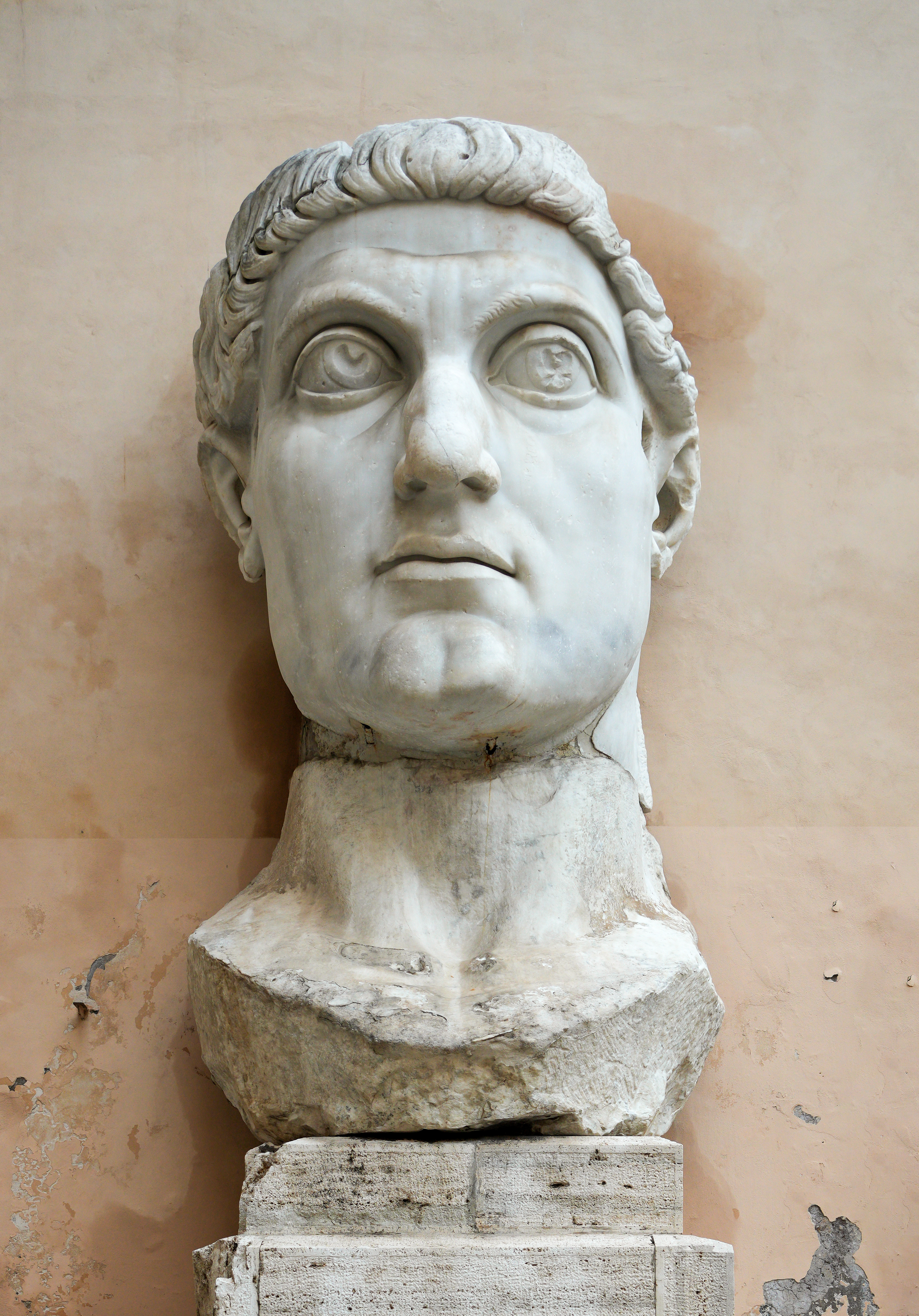
Constantine the Great

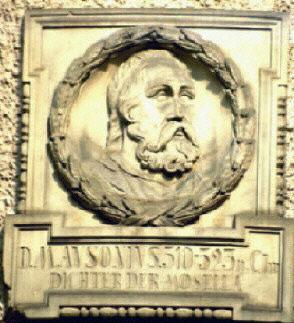
Ausonius

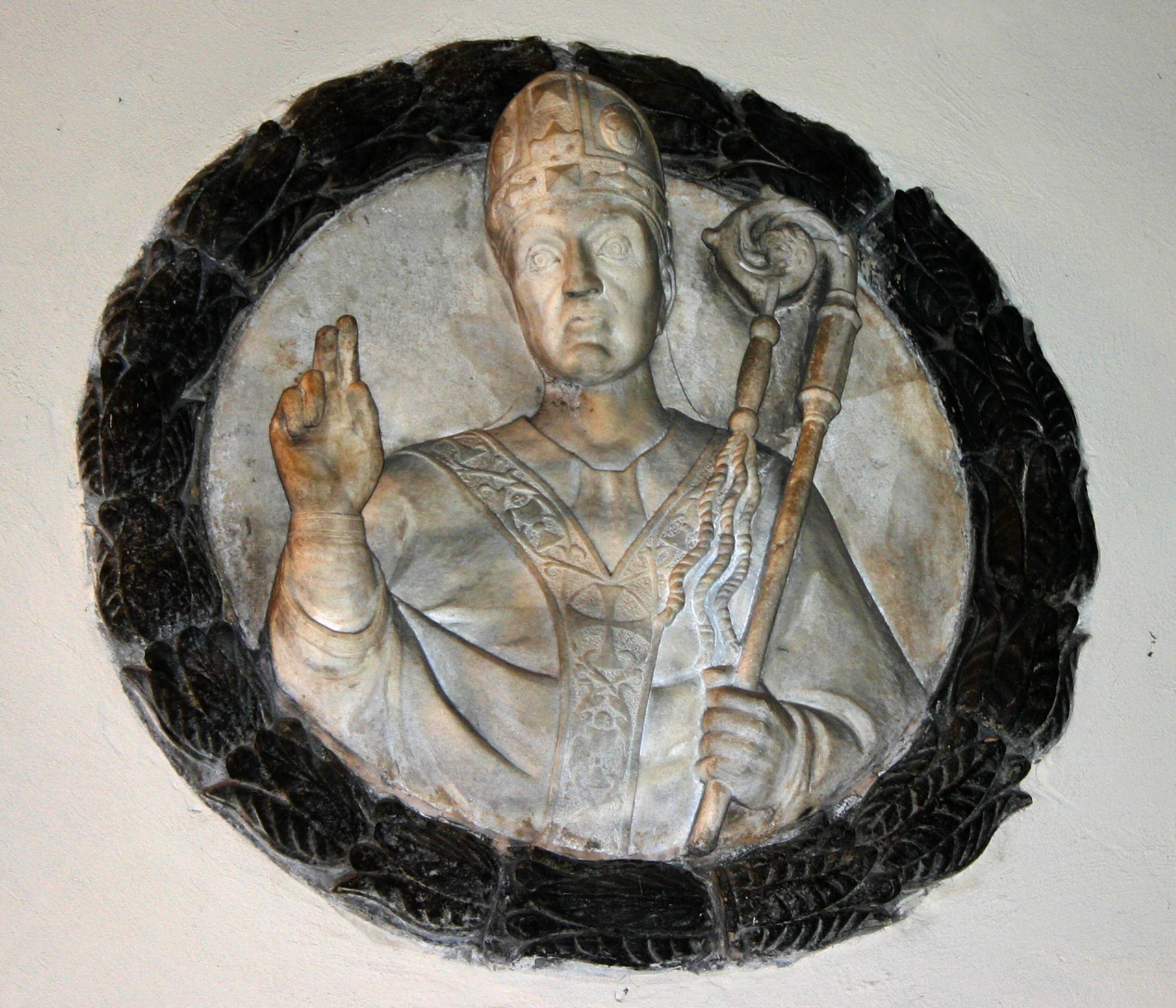
Ambrose

- Domitius Ulpianus (170–228), jurist, imperial officer
- Julius Paulus (2nd & 3rd centuries), jurist, imperial officer
- Aelius Marcianus (2nd & 3rd centuries), jurist
- Herennius Modestinus (3rd century), jurist
- Censorinus (3rd century), historian, essayist
- Quintus Gargilius Martialis (3rd century), horticulturalist, pharmacologist
- Gaius Asinius Quadratus (3rd century), historian
- Quintus Septimius Florens Tertullianus (160–220), "the father of Latin Christianity", polemicist against heresy
- Thascius Caecilius Cyprianus (200–258), converted rhetorician, bishop of Carthage, martyr, saint
- Novatianus (200–258), theologian, rival pope, excommunicant
- Quintus Serenus Sammonicus (2nd century, early 3rd century), scholar, educator
- Commodianus (3rd century), poet, Christian educator
- Lucius Caelius Firmianus Lactantius (240–320), converted rhetorician, scholar, Christian apologist and educator
- Ammianus Marcellinus (4th century), soldier, imperial officer, historian
- Claudius Claudianus (4th century), court poet
- Gaius Julius Solinus (3rd or 4th century), topical writer
- Nonius Marcellus (3rd or 4th century), topical writer
- Marcus Aurelius Olympius Nemesianus (fl. 283), poet
- Aquila Romanus (3rd century), rhetorician
- Eumenius of Autun (3rd century), educator
- Aelius Festus Aphthonius (3rd or 4th century), grammarian
- Calcidius (4th century), translator
- Gaius Marius Victorinus (4th century), converted philosopher
- Arnobius of Sicca (4th century), Christian apologist
- Constantine I (272–337), first Christian emperor
- Nazarius (4th century), rhetorician, educator
- Gaius Julius Victor (4th century), rhetorician
- Gaius Vettius Aquilinus Juvencus (4th century), Christian poet
- Nonius Marcellus (3rd and 4th centuries), grammarian, lexicographer
- Julius Firmicus Maternus (4th century), converted advocate, pagan and Christian writer
- Aelius Donatus (4th century), grammarian, rhetorician, educator
- Palladius (408/431 – 457/461), saint, first bishop of Ireland
- Sextus Aurelius Victor (320–390), imperial officer, historian
- Eutropius (4th century), imperial officer, historian
- Aemilius Magnus Arborius (4th century), poet, educator, friend of the imperial family
- Decimius Magnus Ausonius (c. 310 – 395), poet, rhetorician, educator, friend of the imperial family
- Claudius Mamertinus (4th century), imperial officer, panegyricist, embezzler
- Hilarius (4th century), converted neo-Platonist, theologian, bishop of Poitiers, saint
- Ambrosius (337/340–397), theologian, Bishop of Milan, saint
- Lucifer (d. 370/371), theologian, Bishop of Sardinia
- Priscillianus (d. 385), theologian, first person executed as a heretic
- Flavius Sosipater Charisius (4th century), grammarian
- Diomedes Grammaticus (4th century), grammarian
- Postumius Rufus Festus Avienius (4th century), imperial officer, poet, translator
- Priscianus Caesariensis (fl. 500), grammarian

== See also ==
- Decline of the Roman Empire
- Panegyrici Latini, a collection of 3rd to 4th century panegyrics; their language is however predominantly classical (Golden Age) Latin base, derived from an education heavy on Cicero, mixed with a large number of Silver Age usages and a small number of Late and Vulgar terms.
