= Latinius Pacatus Drepanius =

Latin panegyrist

Latinius Pacatus Drepanius (fl. 389–393), one of the Latin panegyrists, flourished at the end of the 4th century AD.

== Life ==
He came from Aginnum (Agen), in the south of France, in the territory of the Nitiobriges, and received his education in the rhetorical school of Burdigala (Bordeaux). He was the contemporary and intimate friend of Ausonius, who dedicated two of his minor works to Pacatus, and described him as the greatest Latin poet after Virgil.

Pacatus was probably a professor of rhetoric at Bordeaux. Pacatus attained the rank of proconsul of Africa (390) and held a confidential position at the imperial court.

He was the author of an extant speech (ed. R.A.B. Mynors, XII Panegyrici Latini, Oxford 1964, No. 2; English translation in C.E.V. Nixon / Barbara Rodgers, In Praise of Later Roman Emperors, Berkeley 1994) delivered in the senate house at Rome (389) in honor of Theodosius I. It contains an account of the life and deeds of the emperor, the special subject of congratulation being the complete defeat of the usurper Maximus. The speech is one of the best of its kind. Though not altogether free from exaggeration and flattery, it is marked by considerable dignity and self-restraint, and is thus more important as a historical document than similar productions. The style is vivid, the language elegant but comparatively simple, exhibiting familiarity with the best classical literature.

He is attested as comes rerum privatarum in 393.

The writer of the panegyric must be distinguished from Drepanius Florus, deacon of Lyons c. 850, author of some Christian poems and prose theological works.
