= Boot Hill (disambiguation) =

Boot Hill is the name for a number of cemeteries, chiefly in the American West.

Boot Hill may also refer to:

- Boot Hill (video game), an arcade game from Midway
- Boot Hill (film), a western starring Terence Hill
- Boot Hill (role-playing game), a role-playing game from TSR, Inc.
- Boot Hill Bowl, a now defunct post-season college football game played in Dodge City, Kansas
- "Boot Hill", a song performed by artists such as Johnny Winter and Stevie Ray Vaughan
- Boot Hill, a mountain in Mare Tranquillitatis on the moon
- Boot Hill Museum in Dodge City, Kansas
- Boot Hill, another name for the fielding position of short leg in cricket, see Glossary of cricket terms#B
