= Duke Island =

Duke Island may refer to:

- Duke Island (Alaska)
- Duke Island Park, New Jersey
- Duke Island (lunar mountain)

== See also ==
- La Duke Island, Nunavut, Canada
