= Aryabhata (disambiguation) =

Aryabhata (476–550) was a mathematician-astronomer from the classical age of Indian mathematics and Indian astronomy.

Aryabhata may also refer to:

- Aryabhata (crater), on the Moon
- Aryabhata (film), a 1999 Indian Kannada-language drama
- Aryabhata (satellite), the first satellite of India
- Aryabhata II (c. 920 – c. 1000), Indian mathematician and astronomer
- Aryabhata Award, an aerospace award in India

== See also ==
- Aryabhatiya, a Sanskrit astronomical treatise by Aryabhata
  - Āryabhaṭa numeration
  - Āryabhaṭa's sine table
- Chinese remainder theorem
