= Paulinus of Pella =

Paulinus of Pella (377 – after 461) was a Christian poet of the fifth century. He wrote the autobiographical poem Eucharisticos ("Thanksgiving"). His poem is frequently used as an example of life in Gaul in the fifth century during the waning days of the Western Roman Empire.

== Life ==
Paulinus was the son of Thalassius, and the grandson of the poet Ausonius. Paulinus was born at Pella in Macedon while his father was vicarius of Macedonia. Thalassius then succeeded his brother-in-law Decimius Hilarianus Hesperius as proconsul of Africa in 378. Thalassius brought his son Paulinus to Carthage when the latter was less than nine months old.

He grew up far more familiar with Greek -- which he picked up from the household servants—than his native Latin. His education began first with Greek classics including Plato and Homer; when he was introduced to Vergil, he recalls how he "could not catch the beauty and elegance of this foreign language." Just as he was beginning to show some promise in his studies, he was struck down by an ague. Doctors recommended exercise, with the result that hunting and horsemanship replaced books.

Shortly before he was thirty, his parents arranged his marriage to the heiress of a neglected estate; according to his poem, he paid more attention to improving this new estate than he did to his wife. He appears to be at the beginning of a life of luxury and indolence; two major events, however, would change this permanently. The first was the death of his father; the second, and far more serious, was the incursion of the Germanic invaders who had crossed the Rhine on the last day of 406.

Next, the usurper Priscus Attalus made Paulinus his Comes privatae largitionis, or the administrator of the imperial finances; this appointment probably happened in 414, when Attalus and his Visigothic master Ataulf were in southern Gaul. In Attalus' case, since he had no personal property to provide him revenue, this office proved a burden to Paulinus. As a final insult, when Ataulf evacuated Bordeaux, his followers, seeing that Paulinus was an official of Attalus, looted both his and his mother's houses. Homeless, Paulinus and his household fled to Vasatis (modern Bazas), only to be caught up in the Visigoth siege of that town. In attempting to escape that city, he managed to convince the Alans allied with the Visigoths to abandon the latter, who then were forced to lift the siege.

By this point, he had been defrauded of his inherited estates by both Visigoths and his fellow Romans. Paulinus contemplated leaving Gaul entirely and resettling on lands in Greece that belonged to his mother, but his wife refused to make the voyage. Beginning some time after his forty-fifth birthday, his family began to die, beginning with his mother, then his mother-in-law, and then his wife. His two sons died before him; only his daughter possibly survived him, having married years before and gone to live in North Africa. Alone, Paulinus moved to Marseille, to live on a small property he still owned. Yet he lost even this last possession in a mortgage, and was saved from utter destitution only by the opportune purchase of this property by a wealthy Visigoth.

At the age of eighty-three Paulinus composed his autobiographical Eucharisticos. His poem of just over 600 lines is a thanksgiving, although illness, loss of property, and dangers from invasion occupy more space in it than do days of happiness. The account presents a picture of the period, with the expression of high sentiments.

== Text of Eucharisticos ==
Paulinus' name was attached to the Eucharisticos by Marguerin de la Bigne, who edited the editio princeps of the poem in volume III of his Bibliotheca Patrum (Paris, 1579), taking it from the manuscript he used for his publication, which is now lost. A second manuscript containing this poem is a ninth-century manuscript, Berne 317; both the lost and the Berne manuscripts descend from the same archetype.

The "Eucharisticon" was published by Wilhelm Brandes in vol. I of Poetae Christiani minores (1888). H. G. Evelyn White, also published the text with a translation into English for the Loeb Classical Library series in Ausonius (1921). Harold Isbell has translated it for the Penguin Classics series.
