= Decimia gens =

Ancient Roman family

The gens Decimia was a plebeian family at ancient Rome. Members of this gens are first mentioned towards the end of the third century BC, participating on the Roman side during the Second Punic War.

== Origin ==
The first of the Decimii appearing in history was from Bovianum, a town of the Samnites, and those Decimii occurring in later times were likely his descendants, who settled at Rome after obtaining Roman citizenship. The nomen Decimius is a patronymic surname, formed from the praenomen Decimus, the Latin equivalent of the Oscan name Dekis, usually Latinized as Decius. The same root gave rise to the Roman gens Decia.

== Praenomina ==
The main praenomina of the Decimii at Rome were Gaius, Marcus, and Lucius, the three most abundant names at all periods of Roman history. The earliest member of this gens to occur in Roman writers bore the praenomen Numerius, a name common among the Oscan-speaking peoples of Italy, but comparatively scarce at Rome.

== Branches and cognomina ==
The only cognomen found among the Decimii of the Republic is Flavus, meaning "golden" or "golden-brown", originally indicating someone with fair hair.

== Members ==
- Numerius Decimius, a native of Bovianum in Samnium, is described by Livy as a man of great wealth and nobility. In 217 BC, early in the Second Punic War, he led a force of eight thousand infantry and five hundred cavalry, as part of the army of the Roman dictator Quintus Fabius Maximus Verrucosus. Attacking Hannibal from the rear, he turned the tide of battle, saving the magister equitum, and giving the Romans a hard-fought victory.
- Marcus Decimius, one of the ambassadors sent to Crete and Rhodes in 172 BC, shortly before the beginning of the Third Macedonian War. Decimius and Tiberius Claudius Nero were charged with determining whether these Roman allies could be counted upon in the event of hostilities, or whether Perseus of Macedon had attempted to gain their allegiance.
- Lucius Decimius, sent to win the favour of the Illyrian king Gentius in 171 BC, and prevent him from joining forces with Perseus. His embassy produced no result, and it was rumoured that Gentius had bribed him.
- Gaius Decimius, a former quaestor, in the party of Pompeius. He was at Cercina in 47 BC, in charge of procuring supplies, but fled in a small ship upon the arrival of Sallust, then one of Caesar's generals. He should probably be identified with Gaius Decimius, the friend of Titus Pomponius Atticus.
- Decimius Magnus Ausonius, a fourth-century poet and rhetorician.
- Decimius Hilarianus Hesperius, the son of Ausonius, was proconsul of Africa from 376 to 377, and praetorian prefect of Gaul and Italy from 378 to 379.

=== Decimii Flavi ===
- Gaius Decimius Flavus, a military tribune in 209 BC, serving under Marcus Claudius Marcellus. His forces withstood a charge by Hannibal's elephants, preserving Marcellus from defeat. He might be the same person as Gaius Decimius Flavus, praetor in 184 BC.
- Gaius Decimius Flavus, praetor urbanus in 184 BC, dying during his year of office. If not identical with the Flavus who was military tribune in 209 BC, he was probably his son.
- Gaius Decimius (Flavus), an ambassador to Crete in 171 BC. As praetor peregrinus in 169, he was sent to reconcile Antiochus IV and Ptolemy VI. He also visited Rhodes, and reported favourably on their conduct to the Senate. Possibly a son of Gaius Decimius Flavus, praetor urbanus in 184.
- (Gaius) Decimius Flavus, moneyer in 150 BC, perhaps a grandson of Gaius Decimius Flavus, praetor urbanus in 184.

== See also ==
- List of Roman gentes

== Bibliography ==
- Marcus Tullius Cicero, Epistulae ad Atticum.
- Aulus Hirtius (attributed), De Bello Africo (On the African War).
- Titus Livius (Livy), History of Rome.
- Dictionary of Greek and Roman Biography and Mythology, William Smith, ed., Little, Brown and Company, Boston (1849).
- Theodor Mommsen et alii, Corpus Inscriptionum Latinarum (The Body of Latin Inscriptions, abbreviated CIL), Berlin-Brandenburgische Akademie der Wissenschaften (1853–present).
- Pierre Gaspard Hubert Willems, Le Sénat de la République Romaine, Ch. Peeters, Louvain, Ernest Thorin, Paris (1878–1885); Ayers Company Publishers (1975).
- George Davis Chase, "The Origin of Roman Praenomina", in Harvard Studies in Classical Philology, vol. VIII, pp. 103–184 (1897).
- T. Robert S. Broughton, The Magistrates of the Roman Republic, American Philological Association (1952–1986).
- Jones, A.H.M.; J.R. Martindale & J. Morris (1971–1992). Prosopography of the Later Roman Empire. Cambridge University Press. ISBN 0-521-07233-6.
- Michael Crawford, Roman Republican Coinage, Cambridge University Press (1974, 2001).
