= Censorinus (crater) =

Circular depression on the Moon

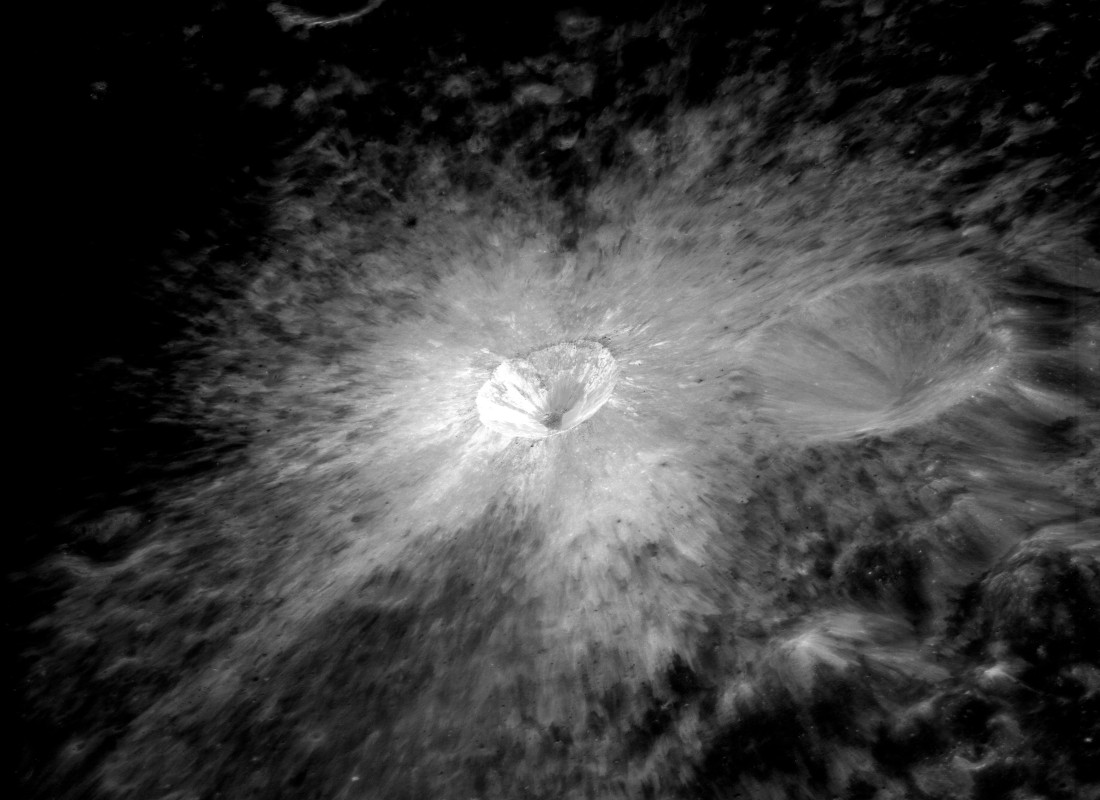
- Oblique view from Apollo 16 showing bright rays
- Coordinates: 0.4°S 32.7°E
- Diameter: 4.10 km (2.55 mi)
- Depth: 0.039 km (0.024 mi)
- Colongitude: 328° at sunrise
- Eponym: Censorinus

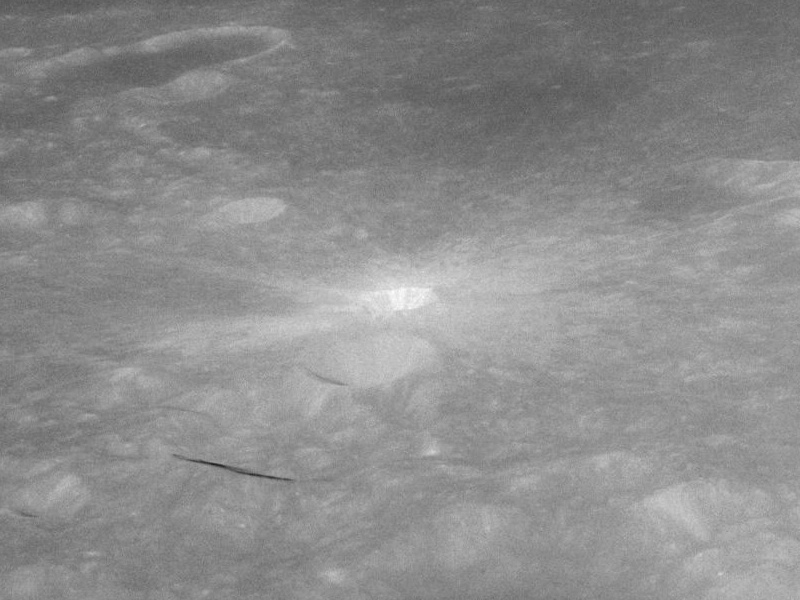
Apollo 11 image

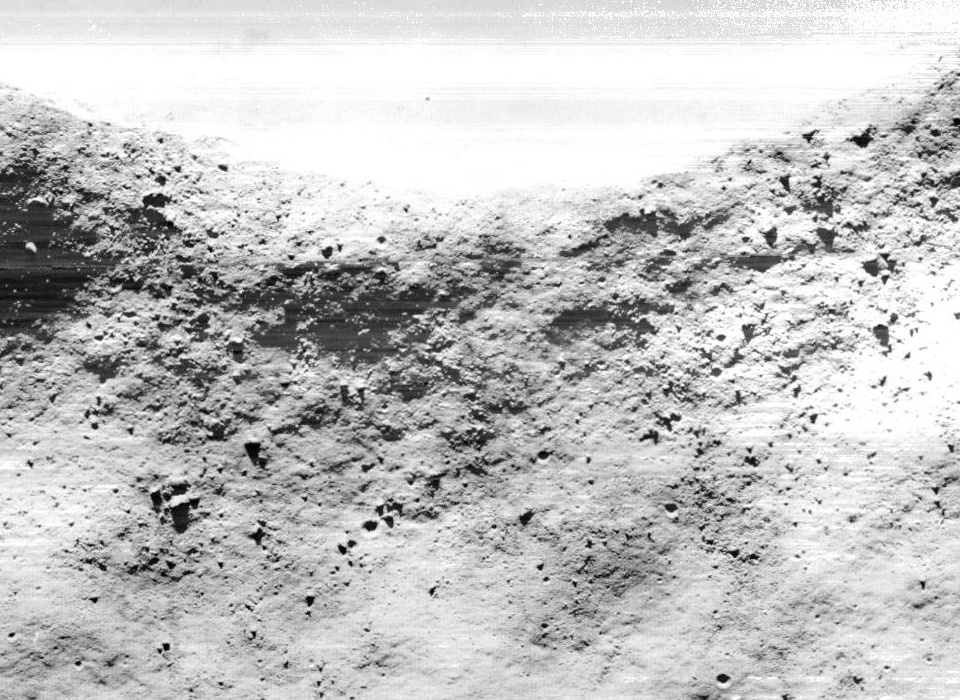
Part of a Lunar Orbiter 5 image showing abundant boulders on the west rim of Censorinus.

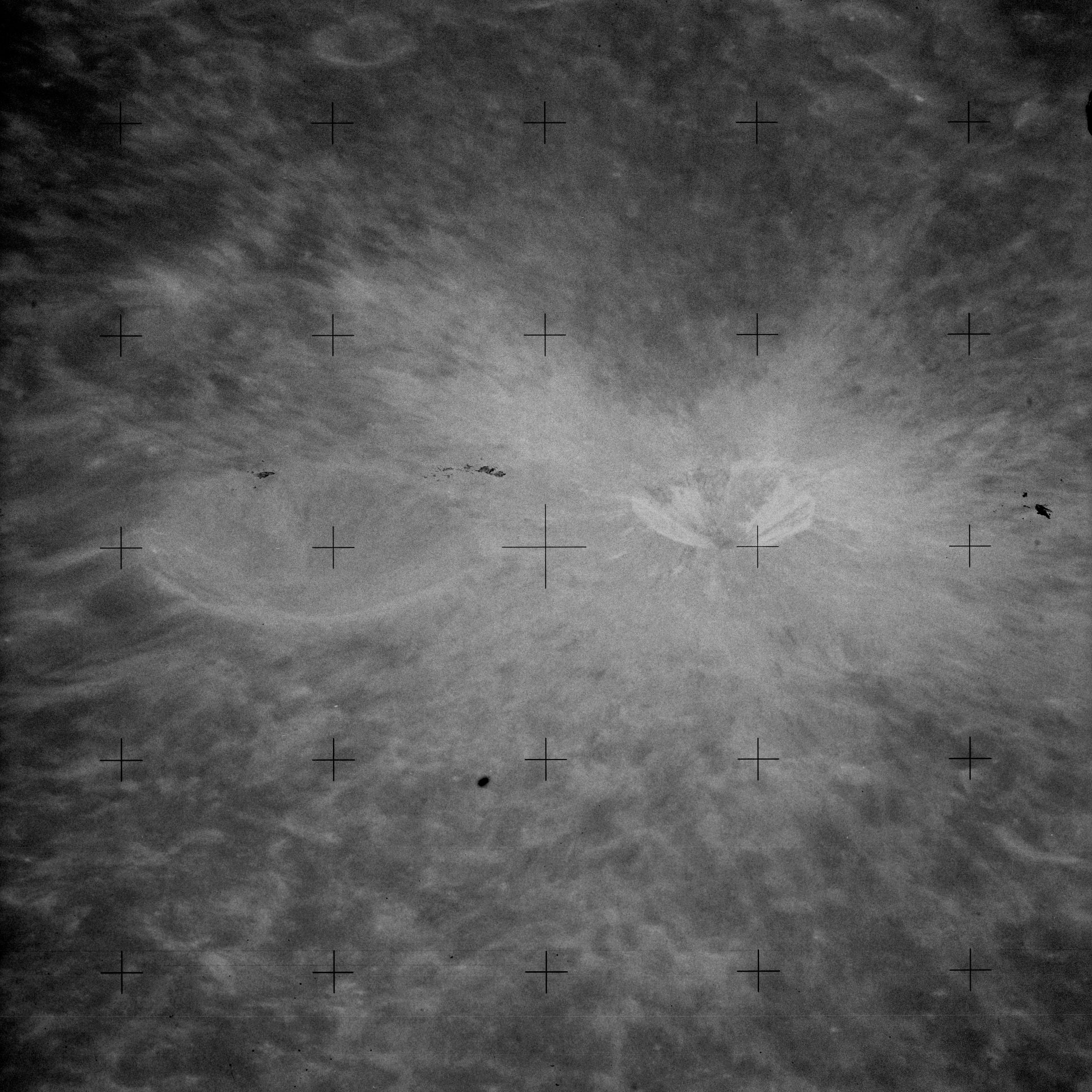
Apollo 15 image

Censorinus is a small lunar impact crater located on a rise to the southeast of the Mare Tranquillitatis. British astronomer T. W. Webb called this "a minute crater, with its vicinity is very brilliant" during full Moon, while Patrick Moore noted this is "one of the brightest points on the whole Moon, and is always conspicuous, particularly under high illumination". To the northwest is the crater Maskelyne.

Censorinus is distinguished by an area of high-albedo material surrounding the rim. This makes the feature highly prominent when the Sun is at a high angle, and it is one of the brightest objects on the visible Moon. Bright streaks radiate away radially from the crater, and contrast with the darker lunar mare.

This formation has a sharp-edged, raised, pear-shaped rim and a symmetrical, cup-shaped interior. The wall slopes downward at an angle of around 32°. Close-up photographs of this crater by Lunar Orbiter 5 and later from orbit by the Lunar Reconnaissance Orbiter show many large blocks lying along the sloping outer rampart. Night time measurements show a temperature anomaly suggesting abundant boulders of basalt. The surface near the crater is hummocky from the deposited ejecta. The crater is otherwise undistinguished.

This crater is named after the ancient Roman writer Censorinus (fl. c. 238). His name was incorporated into lunar nomenclature by Italian selenographer G. B. Riccioli in 1651. Its designation was officially adopted by the International Astronomical Union in 1935.

The vicinity of Censorinus was once considered for an early Apollo landing site. The proposed landing point would have been near the northwest rim, close enough for astronauts to walk to the rim to observe the crater interior and sample boulders of ejecta at various distances from the rim.

== Satellite craters ==
By convention these features are identified on lunar maps by placing the letter on the side of the crater midpoint that is closest to Censorinus.

Censorinus	Latitude	Longitude	Diameter
A	0.4° S	33.0° E	7 km
B	2.0° S	31.4° E	8 km
C	3.0° S	34.1° E	28 km
D	1.9° S	35.8° E	10 km
E	3.6° S	34.8° E	12 km
H	1.8° S	33.7° E	10 km
J	1.0° S	31.3° E	5 km
K	1.0° S	28.8° E	4 km
L	2.5° S	31.2° E	4 km
N	1.9° S	36.5° E	36 km
S	3.8° S	36.1° E	17 km
T	3.2° S	31.1° E	5 km
U	1.5° S	34.4° E	3 km
V	0.6° S	35.4° E	4 km
W	1.0° S	37.5° E	9 km
X	0.5° S	37.2° E	18 km
Z	3.7° S	36.8° E	12 km

The following craters have been renamed by the IAU.

- Censorinus F — See Leakey (crater).
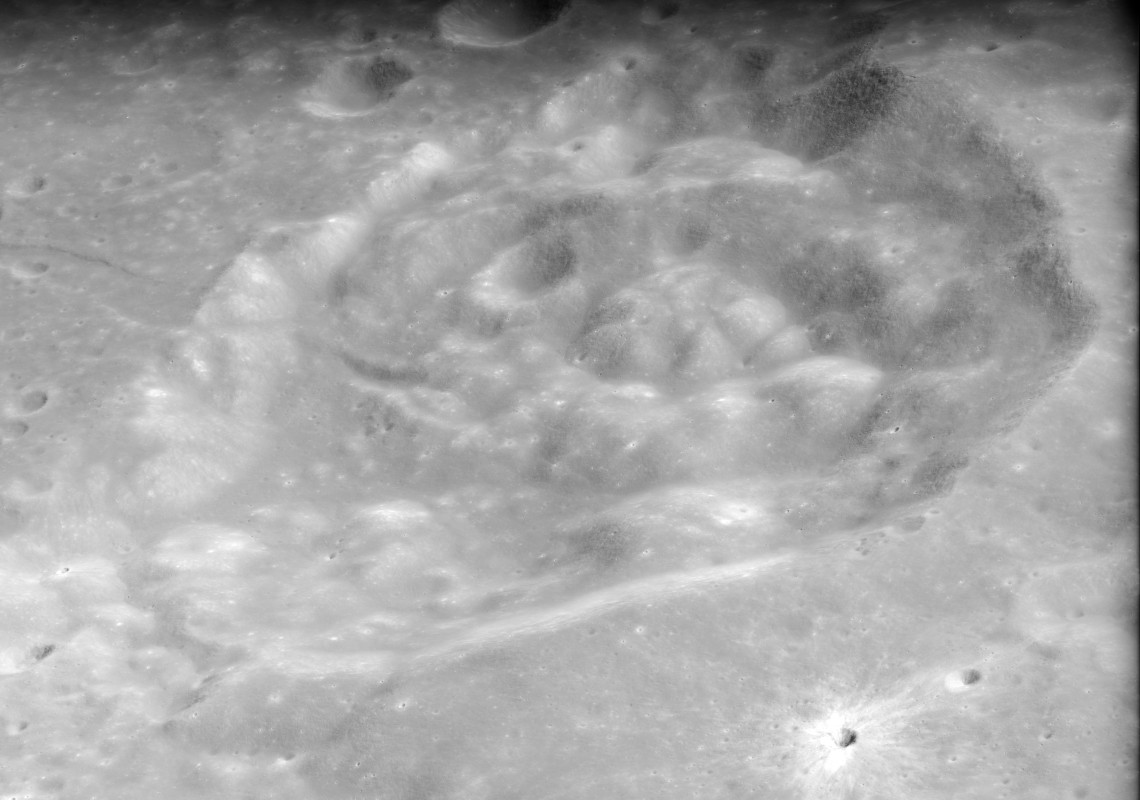
Censorinus E
