= Panegyrici Latini =

Twelve ancient Roman panegyric orations

XII Panegyrici Latini or Twelve Latin Panegyrics is the conventional title of a collection of twelve ancient Roman and late antique prose panegyric orations written in Latin. The authors of most of the speeches in the collection are anonymous, but appear to have been Gallic in origin. Aside from the first panegyric, composed by Pliny the Younger in AD 100, the other speeches in the collection date to between AD 289 and 389 and were probably composed in Gaul. The original manuscript, discovered in 1433, has perished; only copies remain.

== Background ==
Gaul had a long history as a center of rhetoric. It maintained its dominance of the field well into the 4th century. An early lead in the field was taken by the Aedui, early allies of Rome and eager to assimilate to the ways of their new rulers: Maenian schools were celebrated as early as the reign of Tiberius (r. AD 14–37). They continued to flourish into the days of Eumenius' grandfather, but were closed by the mid-3rd century.

There was some revival in the city in the late 3rd century, but after the establishment of Augusta Treverorum (modern Trier) as an imperial capital in the 280s, the orators began feeling jealousy for the imperial patronage enjoyed by the citizens of Trier. Despite the political and economic hegemony of the city, however, Trier failed to make any significant mark on the rhetoric of the period. Nixon and Rodgers suggest that it was simply too close to the imperial court. The surviving evidence (which might be prejudiced by Ausonius' Professors of Bordeaux) points to a shift from Autun and Trier as centers of the art in the Tetrarchic and Constantinian period, moving to Bordeaux later in the 4th century.

The panegyrics evince a familiarity with prior handbooks of rhetoric. Some have argued that Menander of Laodicea's treatises were particularly influential on the collection, and believed his precepts were used in the tenth panegyric. However, because so much of Menander's advice consisted of standard rhetorical procedure, the parallels adduced in favor of Menander as a model are insufficient to prove his direct use by the panegyrists. Other handbooks of rhetoric might also have had influence on the collection. Quintilian's Institutio Oratoria, for example, treats the subject of an oration's ancestry, parentage, and country in a manner similar to the panegyrics of 289, 291, 297, 310, 311, 321, and 389. In any case, the other panegyrics in the collection vary widely from Menander's schema. Parallels with other Latin orators, like Cicero and Pliny the Younger, are less frequent than they would have been if those authors had served as stylistic models.

== Language and style ==
The Latin of the panegyrics is that of a Golden Age Latin base, derived from an education heavy on Cicero, mixed with a large number of Silver Age usages and a small number of Late and Vulgar terms. To students of Latin in Late Antiquity, Cicero and Virgil represented the paragons of the language; as such, the panegyrists made frequent use of them. Virgil's Aeneid is the favorite source, the Georgics the second favorite, and the Eclogues a distant third. (Other poets are much less popular: there are infrequent allusions to Horace, and one complete borrowing from Ovid. When drawing from Cicero's body of work, the panegyrists looked first to those works where he expressed admiration and contempt. As a source of praise, Cicero's panegyric of Pompey in support of the Manilian law (De Imperio Cn. Pompei) was quite popular. It is echoed thirty-six times in the collection, across nine or ten of the eleven late panegyrics. Cicero's three orations in honor of Julius Caesar were also useful. Of these, the panegyrists were especially fond of the Pro Marcello; across eight panegyrics there are more than twelve allusions to the work. For vilification, the Catiline and Verrine orations were the prominent sources (there are eleven citations to the former and eight to the latter work).

Other classic prose models had less influence on the panegyrics. Pliny's Panegyricus model is familiar to the authors of panegyrics 5, 6, 7, 11, and especially 10, in which there are several verbal likenesses. Sallust's Bellum Catilinae is echoed in the panegyrics 10 and 12, and his Jugurthine War in 6, 5, and 12. Livy seems to have been of some use in panegyric 12 and Panegyric 8. The panegyrist of 8 must have been familiar with Fronto, whose praise of Marcus Aurelius he mentions, and the panegyrist of 6 seems to have known Tacitus' Agricola. The Aeduan orators, who refer to Julius Caesar in the context of Gaul and Britain, are either directly familiar with his prose or know of his figure through intermediaries like Florus, the historian. Panegyric 12, meanwhile, contains a direct allusion to Caesar's Bellum civile.

Accentual and metrical clausulae were used by all the Gallic panegyrists. All of the panegyrists, save Eumenius, used both forms at a rate of about 75 percent or better (Eumenius used the former 67.8 percent of the time, and the latter 72.4 percent). This was a common metrical rhythm at the time, but had gone out of style by the 5th century, when metrical considerations no longer mattered.

== Contents ==
| Orator | Manuscript order | Date | Chronological order |
|---|---|---|---|
| Pliny the Younger | I | January 9, 100 | 1 |
| Pacatus | II | 389 | 12 |
| Claudius Mamertinus | III | January 1, 362 | 11 |
| Nazarius | IV | March 321 | 10 |
| Anonymous | V | 311 | 8 |
| Anonymous | VI | 310 | 7 |
| Anonymous | VII | September 307 | 6 |
| Anonymous | VIII | 297 | 4 |
| Eumenius | IX | 298 | 5 |
| Anonymous | X | 289 | 2 |
| Anonymous | XI | 291 | 3 |
| Anonymous | XII | 313 | 9 |
After Rees, Layers of Loyalty, 20.

The collection comprises the following speeches:

1. by Pliny the Younger. It was originally a speech of thanks (gratiarum actio) for the consulship, which he held in 100, and was delivered in the Senate in honour of Emperor Trajan. This work, which is much earlier than the rest of the collection and geographically anomalous, probably served as a model for the other speeches. Pliny was a popular author in the late 4th century—Quintus Aurelius Symmachus modeled his letters on Pliny's, for example—and the whole collection might have been designed as an exemplum in his honor. He later revised and considerably expanded the work, which for this reason is by far the longest of the whole collection. Pliny presents Trajan as the ideal ruler, or optimus princeps, to the reader, and contrasts him with his predecessor Domitian.
2. by Pacatus in honour of Emperor Theodosius I, delivered in Rome in 389.
3. by Claudius Mamertinus in honour of Emperor Julian, delivered in Constantinople in 362, also as a speech of thanks at his assumption of the office of consul of that year.
4. by Nazarius. It was delivered in Rome before the Senate in 321 at the occasion of the fifteenth anniversary of the accession of Constantine I and the fifth anniversary of his sons Crispus and Constantine II (emperor) becoming caesares. The speech is peculiar because none of the honoured emperors was present at its delivery, and because it celebrates Constantine's victory over Maxentius (at the Battle of Milvian Bridge) in 312, avoiding almost any reference to contemporaneous events.
5. from the year 311, delivered in Trier by an anonymous orator, who gives thanks to Constantine I for a tax relief for his home town Autun.
6. by an anonymous (yet different) author, also delivered at the court in Trier in 310, at the occasion of Constantine's quinquennalia (fifth anniversary of accession) and the founding day of the city of Trier. It contains the description of an appearance of the sun god Apollo to Constantine, which has often been regarded as a model of Constantine's later Christian vision. Also, the speech promulgates the legend that the emperor Claudius II was Constantine's ancestor.
7. by an anonymous author delivered at the wedding of Constantine to Maximian's daughter Fausta in 307, probably also at Trier, and it therefore contains the praise of both emperors and their achievements. The bride and the wedding feature only to a very limited degree in the oration.
8. celebrates the reconquest of Britain by Constantius Chlorus, caesar of the tetrarchy, from Allectus in 296. The speech was probably delivered in 297 in Trier, then the residence of Constantius.
9. is the second speech in the collection where the emperor was not present. It is by Eumenius, teacher of rhetoric at Autun, and is directed at the governor of the province of Gallia Lugdunensis. It was most probably delivered in 297/298, either in Autun or Lyon. Apart from its main subject, the restoration of the school of rhetoric at Autun, it praises the achievements of the emperors of the tetrarchy, especially those of Constantius.
10. from the year 289 (and therefore the earliest of the late antique speeches of the collection), at Trier in honour of Maximian at the occasion of the founding day of the city of Rome. According to a disputed manuscript tradition, the author was a certain Mamertinus, who is identified with the author of the next speech.
11. from 291, also at Trier to Maximian, at the emperor's birthday. It is often attributed to Mamertinus, probably magister memoriae (private secretary) of Maximian, though the text is corrupt and the authorship not entirely certain.
12. by an anonymous orator, delivered in Trier in 313, celebrating (and describing extensively) Constantine's victory over Maxentius in 312. The author of this panegyric makes heavy use of Virgil.

== Themes ==
The panegyrics exemplify the culture of imperial praesentia, or "presence", also encapsulated in the imperial ceremony of adventus, or "arrival". The panegyrics held it as a matter of fact that the appearance of an emperor was directly responsible for bringing security and beneficence. The orators held this visible presence in tension with another, more abstract notion of the timeless, omnipresent, ideal emperor. The panegyrist of 291 remarked that the meeting between Diocletian and Maximian over the winter of 290/91 was like the meeting of two deities; had the emperors ascended the Alps together, their bright glow would have illuminated all of Italy. Panegyrics came to form part of the vocabulary through which citizens could discuss notions of "authority". Indeed, because panegyrics and public ceremony were such a prominent part of imperial display, they, and not the emperor's more substantiative legislative or military achievements, became the emperor's "vital essence" in the public eye.

== Origin and tradition of the collection ==
=== Compilation and purpose ===
The formation of the Panegyrici Latini is usually divided into two or three phases. At first, there was a collection of five speeches by various anonymous authors from Autun, containing numbers 5 through 9 above. Later, the speeches 10 and 11, which are connected to Trier, were appended; when 12 joined the collection, is uncertain. At some later date, the speeches 2, 3 and 4 were added. They differ from the earlier orations because they were delivered outside of Gaul (in Rome and Constantinople), and because the names of their authors are preserved. Pliny's panegyric was set at the beginning of the collection as classical model of the genre. Sometimes the author of the last speech, Pacatus, is credited as the editor of the final corpus. This belief is founded on the position of Pacatus' speech in the corpus—second after Pliny's—and because of the heavy debt Pacatus owes to the earlier speeches in the collection. Although most of the speeches in the borrow from their predecessors in the collection, Pacatus borrows the most, taking ideas and phraseology from almost all the other speeches. He is especially indebted to the panegyric of 313.

Because the collection is thematically unconnected and chronologically disordered, Nixon and Rodgers conclude that "it served no political or historical purpose", and was simply a tool for students and practitioners of panegyrical rhetoric. Roger Rees, however, argues that the circumstances of its composition (if Pacatus is taken as its compiler) suggest that it was intended to illustrate Gaul's continuing loyalty to Rome. Along the same line, Pacatus' speech of 389 might have been meant to reassure Theodosius (who had defeated the usurper Magnus Maximus in Gaul the previous year) that Gaul was completely loyal to him.

=== Manuscript tradition ===
Of the sixteen surviving Latin speeches written in praise of Roman emperors before the year 400, twelve are included in the Panegyrici Latini. The remaining four are three fragmentary speeches by Symmachus and one speech by Ausonius. Only one manuscript of the Panegyrici Latini survived into the 15th century, when it was discovered in 1433 in a monastery in Mainz, Germany by Johannes Aurispa. That manuscript, known as M (Moguntinus), was copied several times before it was lost. Two branches of Italian manuscripts derive from a copy Aurispa made of M, X^{1} and X^{2}. These are also lost, but twenty-seven manuscripts descend from the pair. The evidence of the surviving manuscripts suggests that Aurispa's copy of M was made in haste, and that the Italian manuscripts are generally inferior to the other tradition, H.

Another independent tradition branches off of M: H (at the British Library: Harleianus 2480), N (at Cluj, Romania: Napocensis), and A (at the Uppsala University Library). H and N are both 15th-century manuscripts, transcribed in a German hand. H shows corrections from a near-contemporary, h. N was copied at some time between 1455 and 1460 by the German theologian Johannes Hergot. Detailed investigation of the manuscripts by D. Lassandro has revealed that A derives from N and N derives from H. H is usually considered the best surviving manuscript.

Modern editions of the Panegyrici incorporate variant readings from outside H. For example, when X^{1} and X^{2} are in agreement, they sometimes preserve the true reading of M against H. They also contain useful emendations from the intelligent humanist corrector of Vaticanus 1775. Early print editions also prove helpful, as Livineius' 1599 Antwerp edition contains variant readings from the work of scholar Franciscus Modius, who made use of another manuscript at the abbey of Saint Bertin at Saint-Omer (Bertinensis). Bertinensis is now generally believed to be cognate with, rather than derived from, M. Cuspinianus' 1513 Vienna edition has proved more problematic. The relationship of M to the manuscripts Cuspinianus used is a mystery, and additional material, varying in length from single words to whole clauses, is found in Cuspinianus' text and nowhere else. Some scholars, like Galletier, reject Cuspinianus' additions in their entirety; Nixon and Rodgers chose to judge each addition separately. Puteolanus' 1476 Milan edition and h's corrections have also proved valuable.
