= Nazarius (rhetorician) =

Nazarius, (fl. 4th century CE), was a Roman and a Latin rhetorician and panegyrist. He was, according to Ausonius, a professor of rhetoric at Burdigala (Bordeaux).

The extant speech of which he is undoubtedly the author (in R.A.B. Mynors, XII Panegyrici Latini, Oxford 1964, No. 4; English translation in C.E.V. Nixon / Barbara Rodgers, In Praise of Later Roman Emperors, Berkeley 1994) was delivered in 321 CE to celebrate the fifteenth anniversary of the accession of Constantine the Great, and the fifth of his son Constantine's admission to the rank of Caesar. The preceding speech (No. 12), celebrating the victory of Constantine over Maxentius, delivered in 313 CE at Augusta Treverorum (Trier), has often been attributed to Nazarius, but the difference in style and vocabulary, and the more distinctly Christian coloring of Nazarius's speech, are against this.
