= Bissula =

4th century Almannic woman

Bissula (flourished in 4th century AD) was an Alemannic woman in the 4th century. She was captured by the Romans in 368 at the Battle of Solicinium, in the area of Württemberg, at a young age and became a slave of the Roman poet Ausonius who had participated in the campaign. Ausonius, who by then was a widower of about 60 years of age, fell in love with Bissula and released her from slavery. He wrote a poem on her, de Bissula ("About Bissula"), which he sent to his friend Paulus.

== Sources ==
- Latin text of beginning of the main part. Click on Next for the next part.
- Liebesgedichte an Bissula, a German translation by M. W. Besser, 1908
- Friedrich Marx: Ausonius 3. In: Paulys Realencyclopädie der classischen Altertumswissenschaft (RE). Band II,2, Stuttgart 1896, Sp. 2562–2580, hier Sp. 2564 und Sp. 2571.
- Felix Dahn: Gesammelte Werke. Erste Serie, Band 3. Berlin 1884.
