= Maskelyne (crater) =

Small circular depression on the Moon

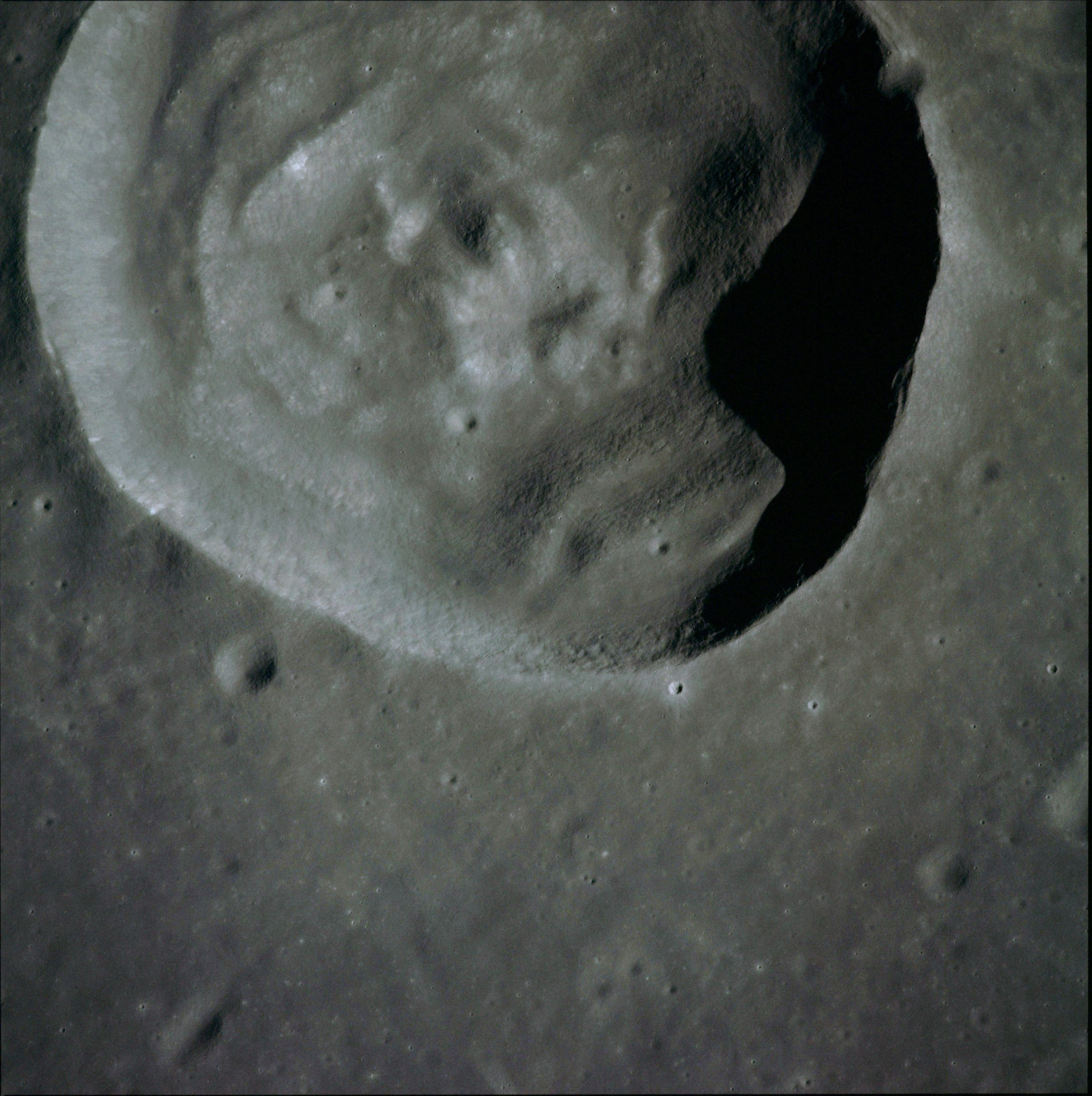
- Apollo 10 Hasselblad Camera image
- Coordinates: 2.2°N 30.1°E
- Diameter: 22 km
- Depth: 2.5 km
- Colongitude: 330° at sunrise
- Eponym: Nevil Maskelyne

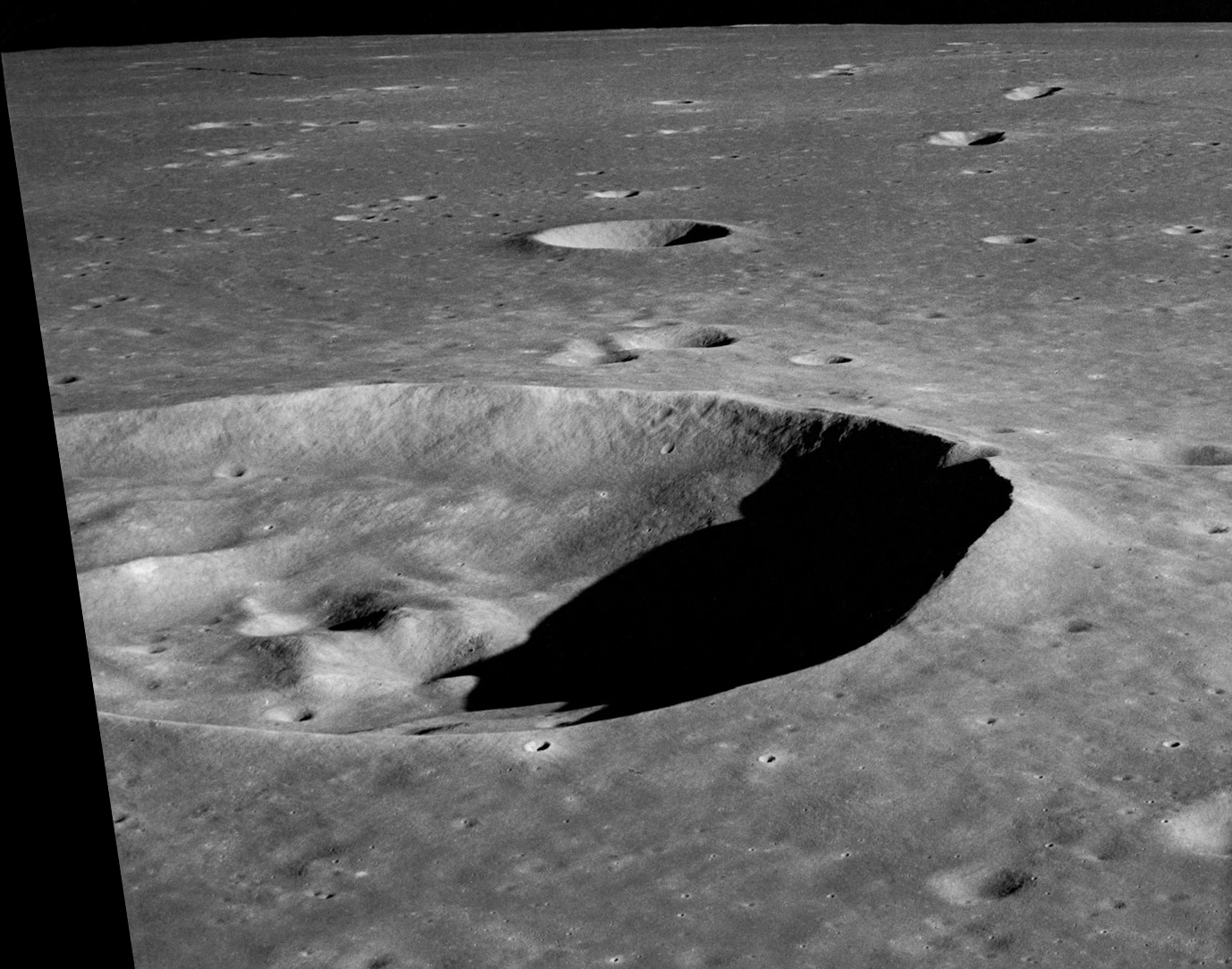
Oblique view of Maskelyne from Apollo 10

Maskelyne is a solitary lunar impact crater that lies in the southeast part of the Mare Tranquillitatis. Its diameter is 22 km. It was named after British astronomer Nevil Maskelyne. The outer rim has a somewhat polygonal shape, although it is generally circular. The inner walls are terraced and there is a low central rise at the midpoint of the floor.

Tranquility Base, the landing site of the 1969 Apollo 11 expedition, is located about 250 kilometers to the west-southwest. To the northeast are Wallach and Aryabhata. To the southeast is the bright Censorinus. To the south are the lunar mountains informally known as Duke Island and Boot Hill. There are sinuous rilles southwest and west of Maskelyne - these were informally named Sidewinder and Diamondback by the Apollo 10 crew and referred to as such by later missions, especially Apollo 11.

== Satellite craters ==
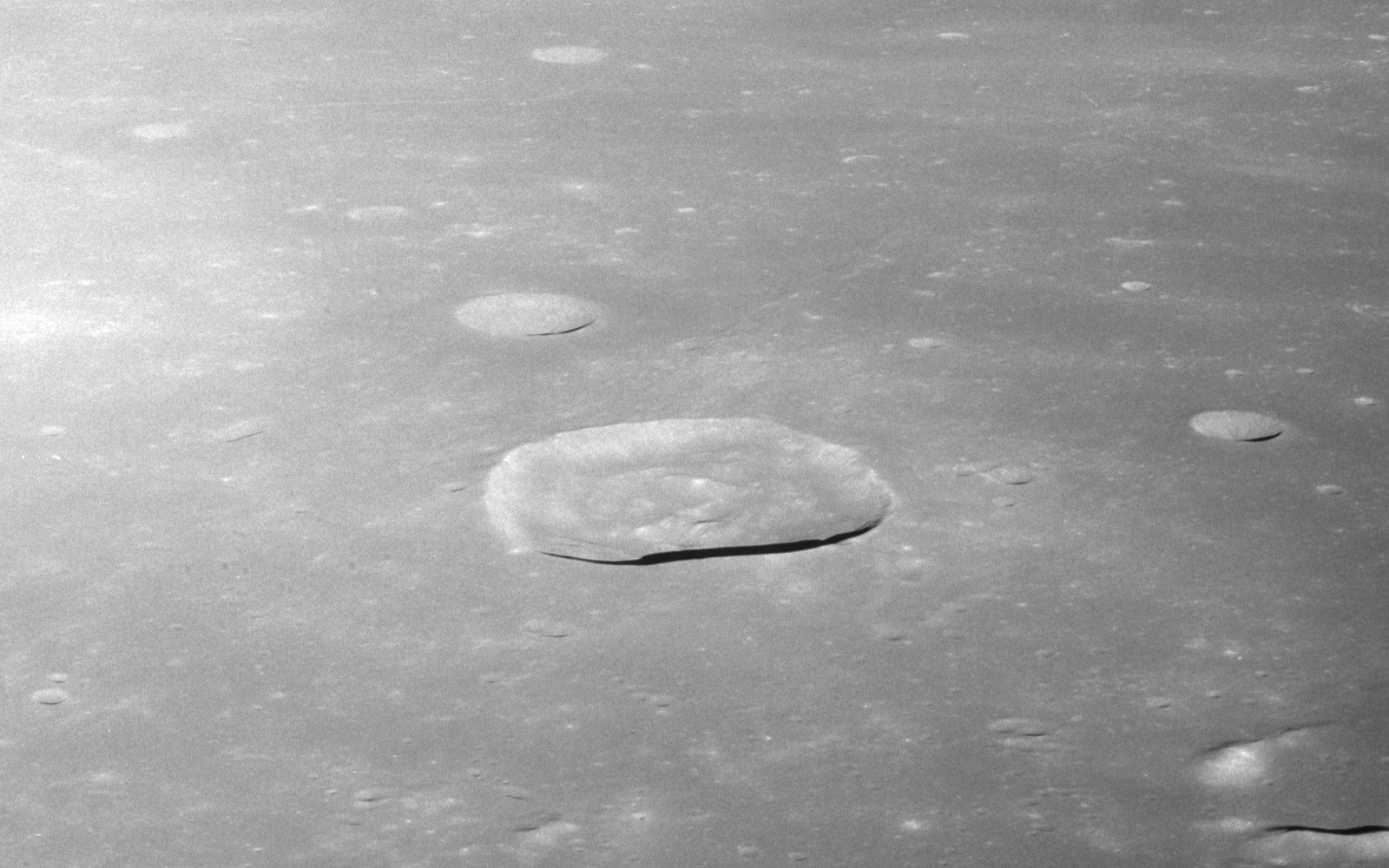
Oblique view facing west from Apollo 11, showing Maskelyne at center, with Maskelyne B above center, Maskelyne G near top center, Maskelyne X and Y in upper left, and Maskelyne K at right.

By convention these features are identified on lunar maps by placing the letter on the side of the crater midpoint that is closest to Maskelyne.

Maskelyne	Latitude	Longitude	Diameter
A	0.1° N	34.0° E	29 km
B	2.0° N	28.9° E	9 km
C	1.1° N	32.7° E	9 km
D	2.5° N	32.5° E	33 km
F	4.2° N	35.3° E	21 km
G	2.4° N	26.7° E	6 km
J	3.2° N	32.7° E	4 km
K	3.3° N	29.6° E	5 km
M	7.8° N	27.9° E	8 km
N	5.4° N	30.3° E	5 km
P	0.5° N	34.1° E	10 km
R	3.0° N	31.3° E	13 km
T	0.0° S	36.6° E	5 km
W	0.9° N	29.2° E	4 km
X	1.3° N	27.4° E	4 km
Y	1.8° N	28.1° E	4 km

The following craters have been renamed by the IAU.

- Maskelyne E — See Aryabhata (crater).
- Maskelyne H — See Wallach (crater).
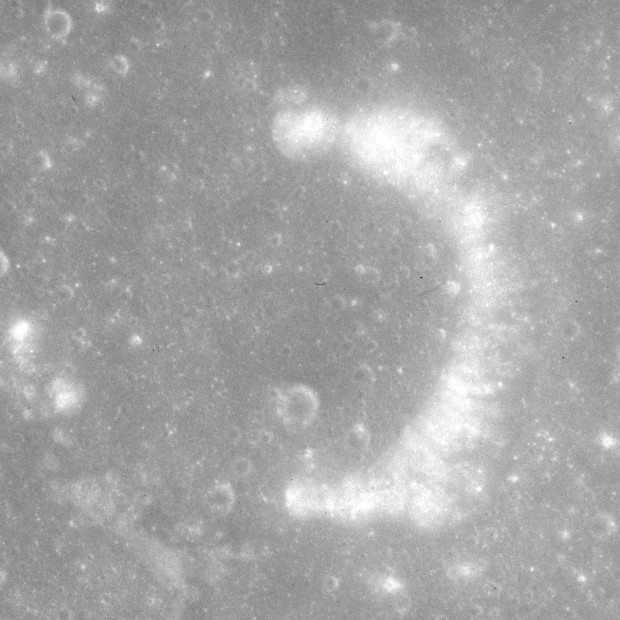
Apollo 15 image of Maskelyne F

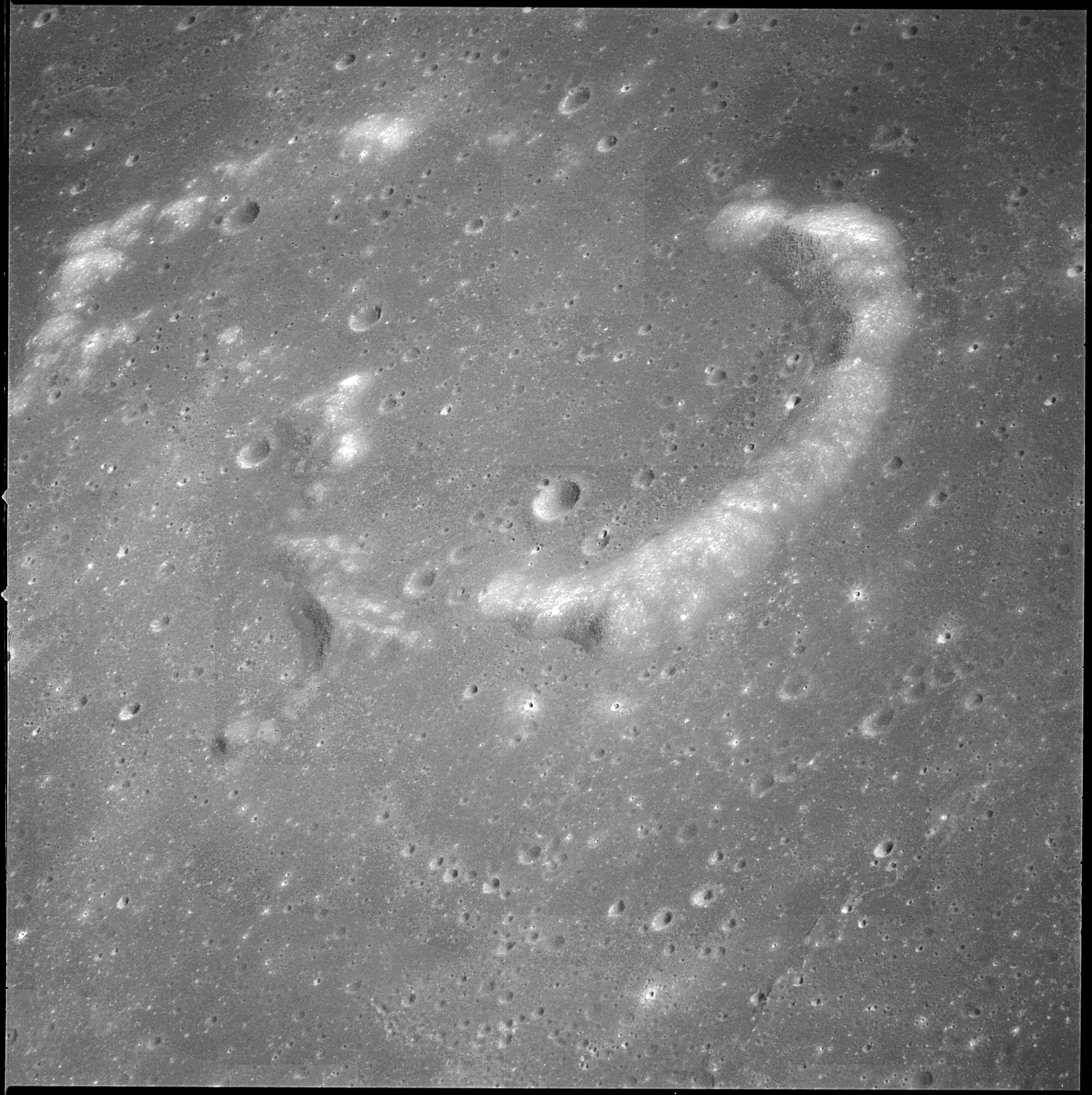
Oblique view of Maskelyne F from Apollo 10

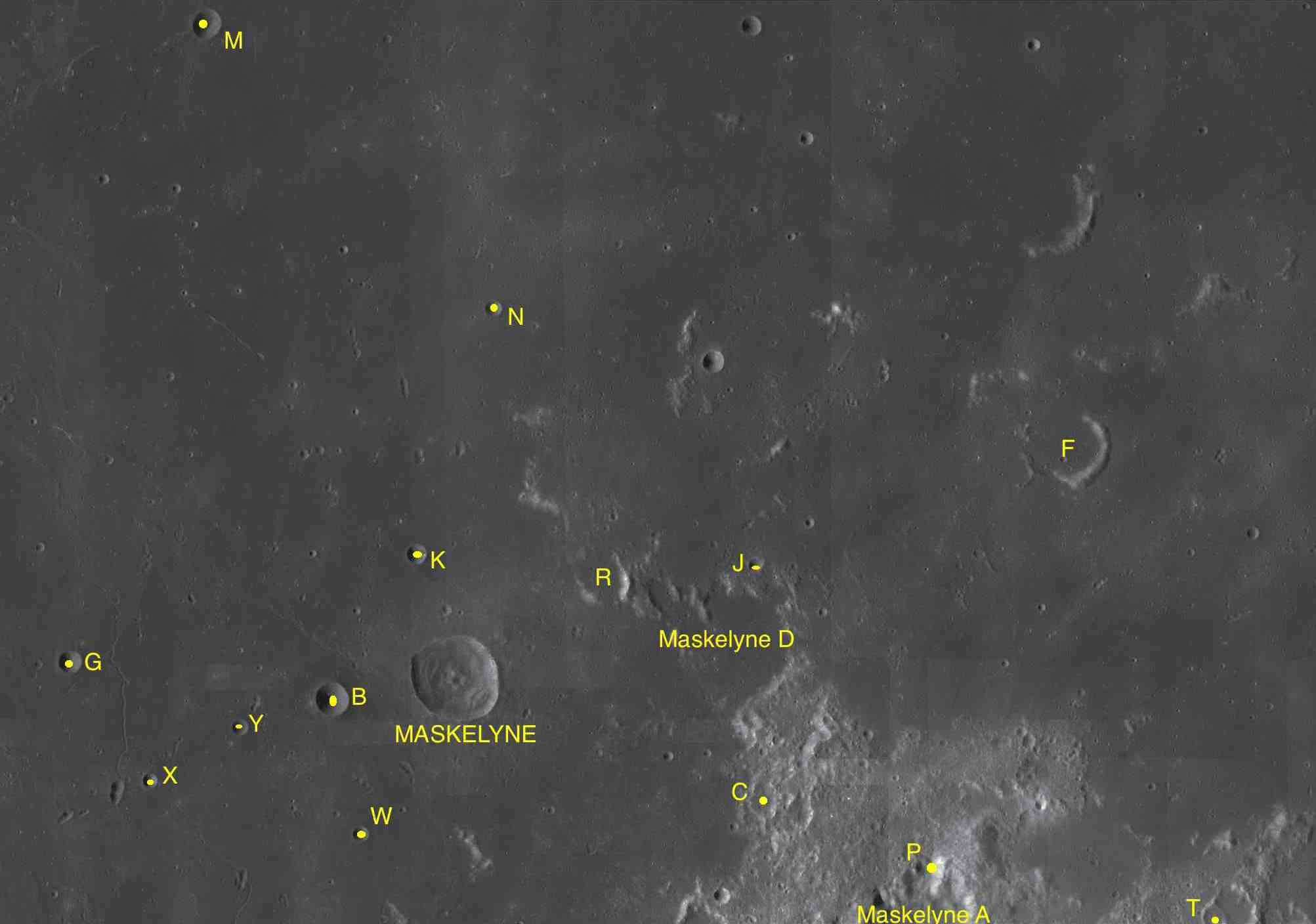
Satellite craters of Maskelyne
