= Julius Ausonius =

Ancient Roman physician of the 3rd century CE

Julius Ausonius was an eminent physician of ancient Rome who lived in the 3rd and 4th centuries CE. He is chiefly known for his being the father of the renowned poet Decimius Magnus Ausonius, from whose works almost all the events of Julius's life are known.

He was a native of Cossio Vasatum (the modern city of Bazas), but at some point moved to Burdigala (modern Bordeaux). He married Aemilia Aeonia, with whom he lived thirty-six years, and by whom he had four children: two sons, Avitianus and the poet Ausonius, and two daughters, Aemilia Melania and Julia Dryadia.

He was appointed praefect of Illyricum by the emperor Valentinian I. He died at the age either of eighty-eight or ninety, after having enjoyed, according to Ausonius, "perfect health both of body and mind". If he at all resembled the description given of him by his son, he must have been a most remarkable man, as almost every intellectual and moral excellence is attributed to him.

He also wrote some medical works, which have not survived.
