= Avitianus (brother of Ausonius) =

Ancient Roman brother of poet Ausonius

Avitianus was a youth of ancient Rome, the son of Julius Ausonius and Aemilia Aeonia, and brother to the renowned poet Ausonius, and two other sisters, Aemilia Melania, who died in infancy, and Dryadia. He lived in the 4th century CE.

He was said to have been a young man of great talent and promise, who was being brought up to follow his father's profession as a physician, but died before reaching puberty. His older brother Ausonius laments his premature death in one of his poems, the Parentalia, saying that he felt more like a grieving parent than older brother, and gives the above particulars of his life.
