= Aemilia Hilaria =

Gallo-Roman physician

- Born: c. 300; Moselle, Roman Empire
- Died: c. 363
- Occupation: physician
- Relatives: Ausonius (nephew)

Aemilia Hilaria (c. 300 – c. 363) was a Gallo-Roman physician. She practiced medicine, and wrote books on gynecology and obstetrics. She was called "Hilaria" due to her cheerfulness as a baby.

== Early life ==
Aemilia was born in the Roman Empire, the area of present Moselle, France. She was the daughter of Caecilius Agricius Arborius and Aemilia Corinthia Maura, both poor nobles from Gaul. Aemilia and her siblings all took the family name of their mother, which historian Hagith Sivan noted was uncommon for the time. Aemilia Hilaria was given the male nickname "Hilarius" as an infant because she was "affable like a boy." Her nephew, Ausonius, reported that she continued to act in a more masculine manner into her childhood and dress in a less feminine manner into adulthood, which may have led to her remaining unmarried; however, it is notable that during this time period Christian women were encouraged to hide their feminine appearances by the clergy. It is unknown if Aemilia Hilaria was a Christian; Ausonius's phrasing seems to imply that she was, but may simply be poetic writing.

== Physician ==
Aemilia Hilaria continued to live in the area as an adult and became a physician there. Aemilia was the maternal aunt of Ausonius, a Gallo-Roman senator who became tutor to the Emperor Gratian. Ausonius wrote a series of biographical poems about his family members, including Ameilia, called Parentalia.

Everything we know today about Aemilia Hilaria and her family comes from Parentalia. Ausonius's poem about his aunt described her as a "dedicated virgin", who rejected marriage in order to further her career. He described her as "trained in the medical arts as well as any man." Gillian Clark (historian) suggested that the phrasing may suggested that Aemilia Hilaria pursued medicine as a "full-time commitment." Ausonius further described her as an honest and skilled physician, who also assisted her physician brother in his own studies. He referenced that she loved him as if she were his mother so that he performed her last rites as a son would.

== In popular culture ==
Aemilia is a featured figure on Judy Chicago's installation piece The Dinner Party, being represented as one of the 999 names on the Heritage Floor. She is related to the Hypatia place setting.

== Bibliography ==
- Hurd-Meade, Kate Campbell (1938). A History of Women in Medicine. Haddam Press; First edition.
