= Eumenius =

3rd century Gallo-Roman rhetorician and author

Eumenius (Greek: Εύμένιος; born c. 260 CE at the latest, more probably between 230 and 240 CE), was one of the Ancient Roman panegyrists and author of a speech transmitted in the collection of the Panegyrici Latini (Pan. Lat. IX). He taught at the Gallo-Romain university of Augustodunum (modern Autun, France).

== Life ==
Eumenius was born in Gallia Lugdunensis at Augustodunum (modern Autun), the civitas capital of the Celtic Aedui. He was of Greek descent; his grandfather, who had migrated from Athens to Rome, finally settled at Augustodunum as a teacher of rhetoric. Eumenius probably took his father's place, for it was from Augustodunum that he went to be magister memoriae (private secretary) to the emperor Constantius Chlorus, whom he accompanied on several of his campaigns.

In 296 CE, Chlorus determined to restore the famous schools (scholae Maenianae) of Augustodunum. During the periodic crises of 3rd-century Gaul, instruction had ceased, possibly for lack of funding or students, and the buildings had been greatly damaged during a siege of the city in 269 CE. The emperor appointed Eumenius to the management of the schools, allowing him to keep the rank of a senior imperial officer and doubling his salary. Eumenius gave up a considerable portion of his emoluments to the improvement of the schools.

Eumenius was a pagan and had not converted to Christianity, unlike Ausonius and Sidonius Apollinaris and other 4th- and 5th-century writers from Gaul.

== Panegyric ==
His speech, usually called Pro restaurandis (or instaurandis) scholis (For the restoration of the schools), was probably delivered in 297 CE or 298 CE in the forum at Augustodunum or Lugdunum (modern-day Lyon) before the governor of the province. The purpose was to ask the governor if Eumenius might dedicate his salary (or a large part of it) to rebuild the schools at Autun. He praises the emperors (Constantius Chlorus and his colleagues of the tetrarchy) and sets forth the steps necessary to restore the schools to their former state of efficiency, stressing that he intends to assist the good work out of his own pocket. He cites the imperial letter of Constantius granting him his position and salary at length, and it is from the address of this letter that the name of the oration's author is preserved.

Formerly, other anonymous panegyrics of the Panegyrici Latini were attributed to Eumenius as well. The most extreme position was that of Otto Seeck, who held that all of them were by him. This view has been largely abandoned today, and Eumenius is regarded as the author of only Pro instaurandis scholis.

== See also ==
- Panegyrici Latini
