= Wallach (crater) =

Crater on the Moon

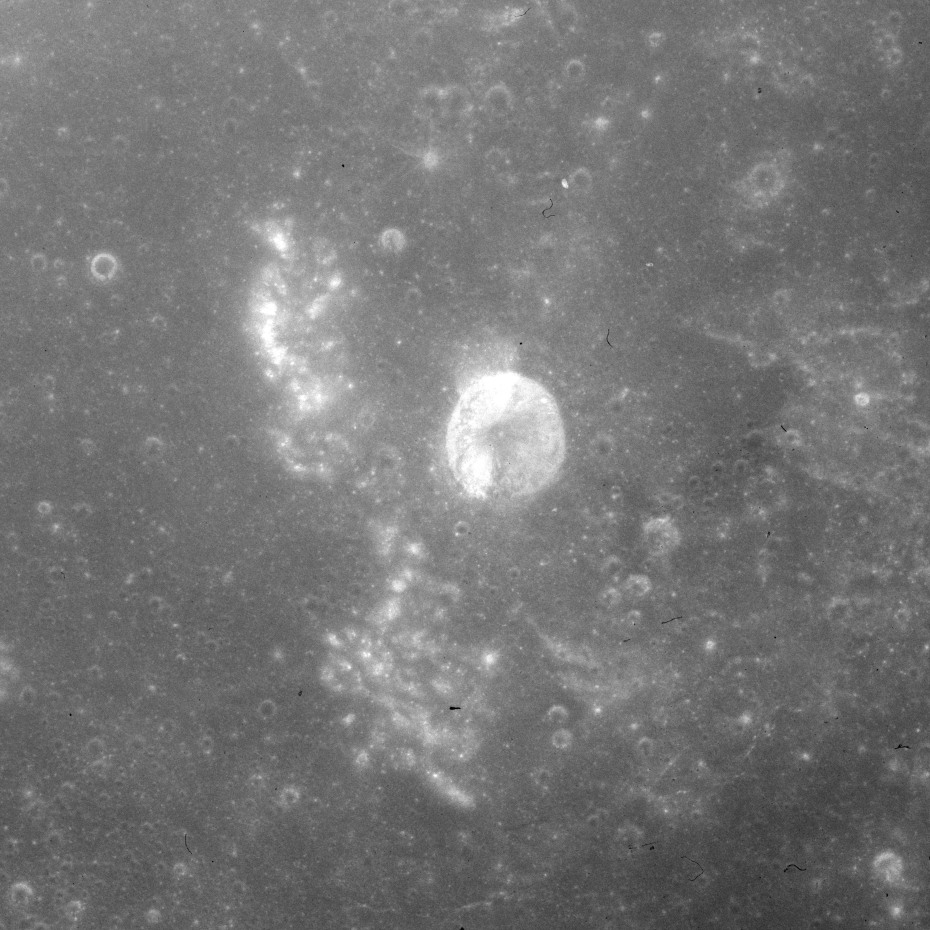
- Apollo 15 mapping camera image
- Coordinates: 4.89°N 32.27°E
- Diameter: 5.74 km
- Depth: 1.54 km
- Colongitude: 328° at sunrise
- Eponym: Otto Wallach

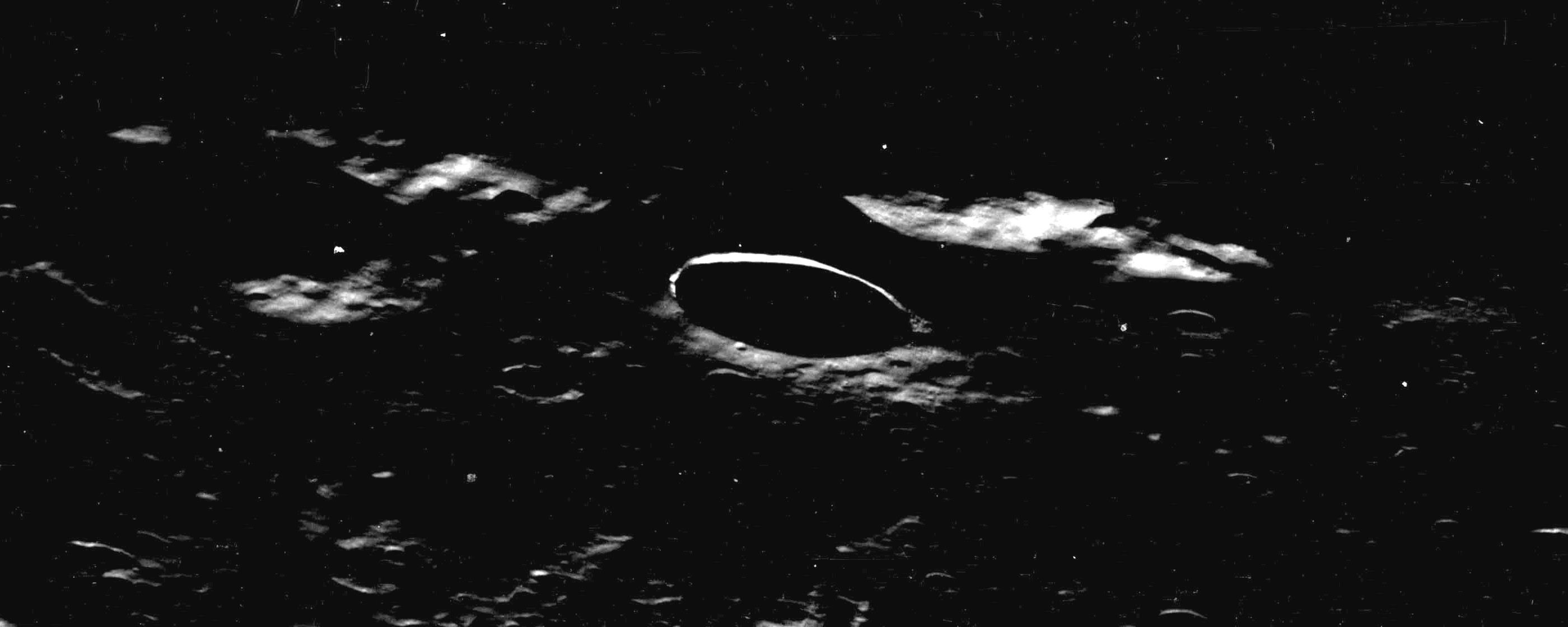
Oblique view of Wallach at low sun angle from Apollo 8, facing west

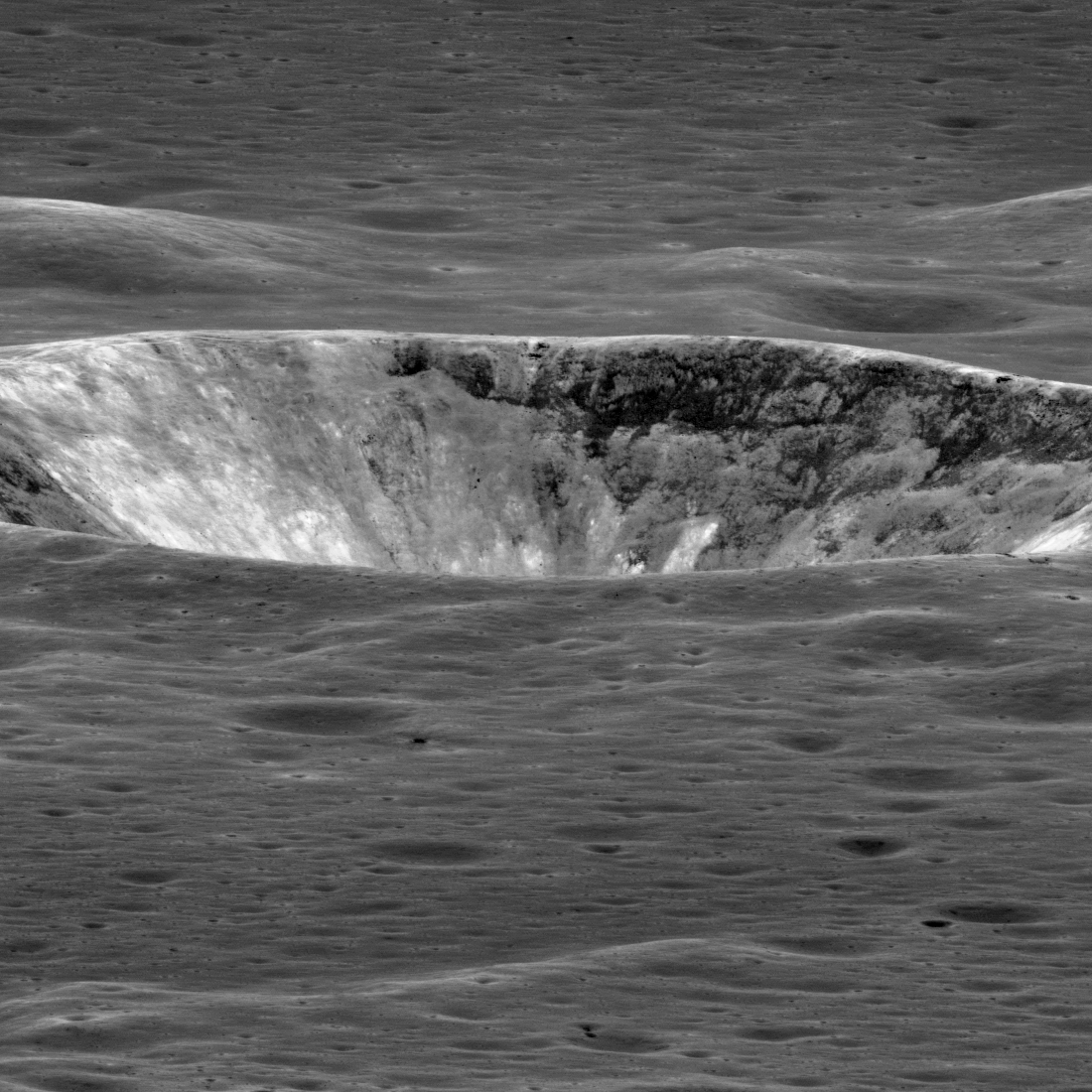
Oblique view of Wallach from LRO

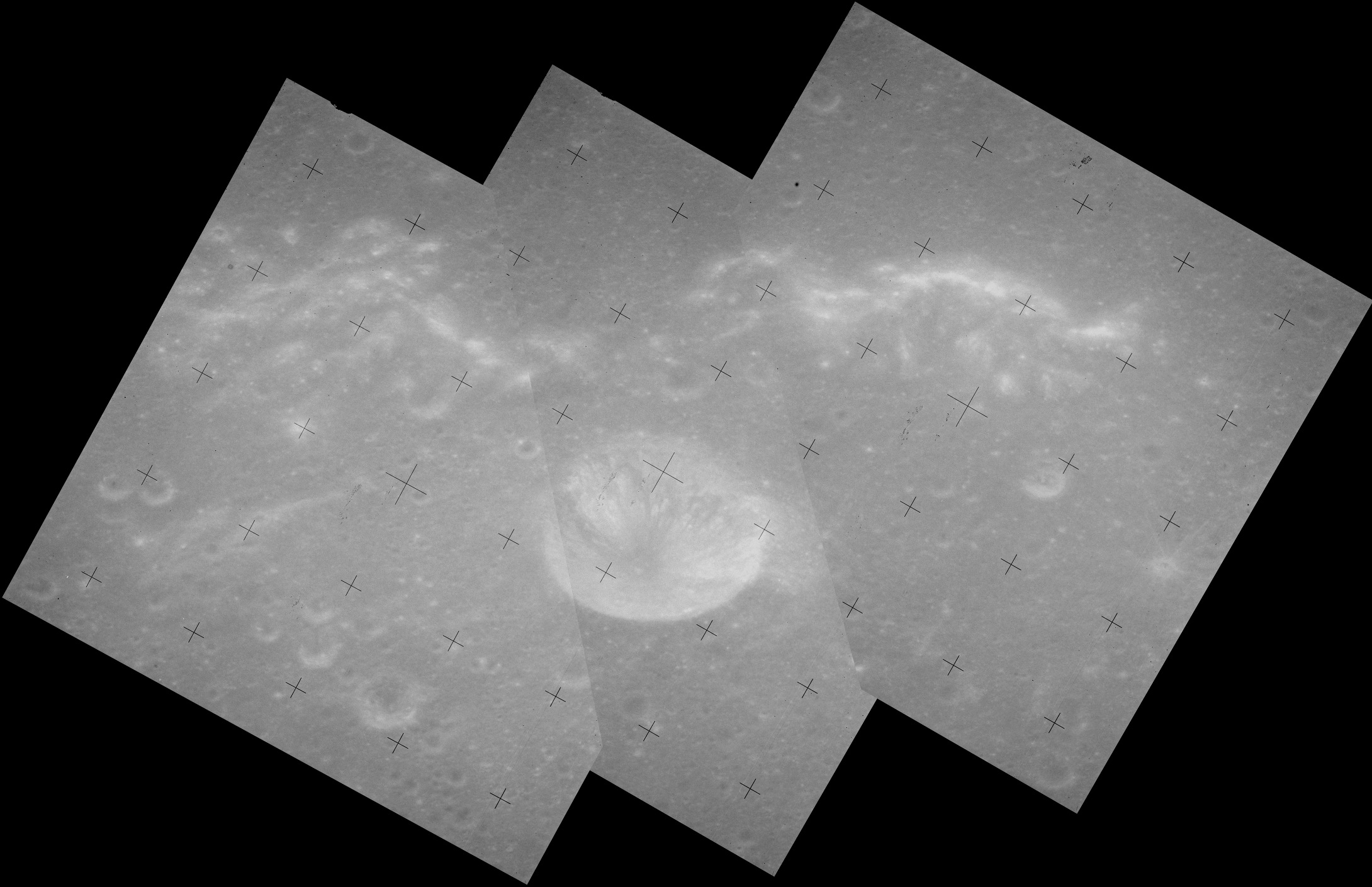
Oblique view of Wallach from Apollo 15, facing west

Wallach is a tiny lunar impact crater located in the eastern Mare Tranquillitatis. It was named after German chemist and Nobel laureate Otto Wallach in 1979. It is a circular, bowl-shaped feature with a negligible interior floor; the inner walls just slope down to the midpoint of the crater. Wallach is located to the northeast of the crater Maskelyne, near some low ridges in the lunar mare. It was previously identified as Maskelyne H before being given a name by the IAU.

An unusual and apparently unnamed elongate crater about 2 km x 5 km in size and about 44 km east of Wallach was the subject of a landmark tracking exercise on Apollo 8 in December 1968. The feature was photographed repeatedly from its emergence on the horizon to after the Command Module had passed directly over it.
