= Duke Island (lunar mountain) =

Mountain on the Moon

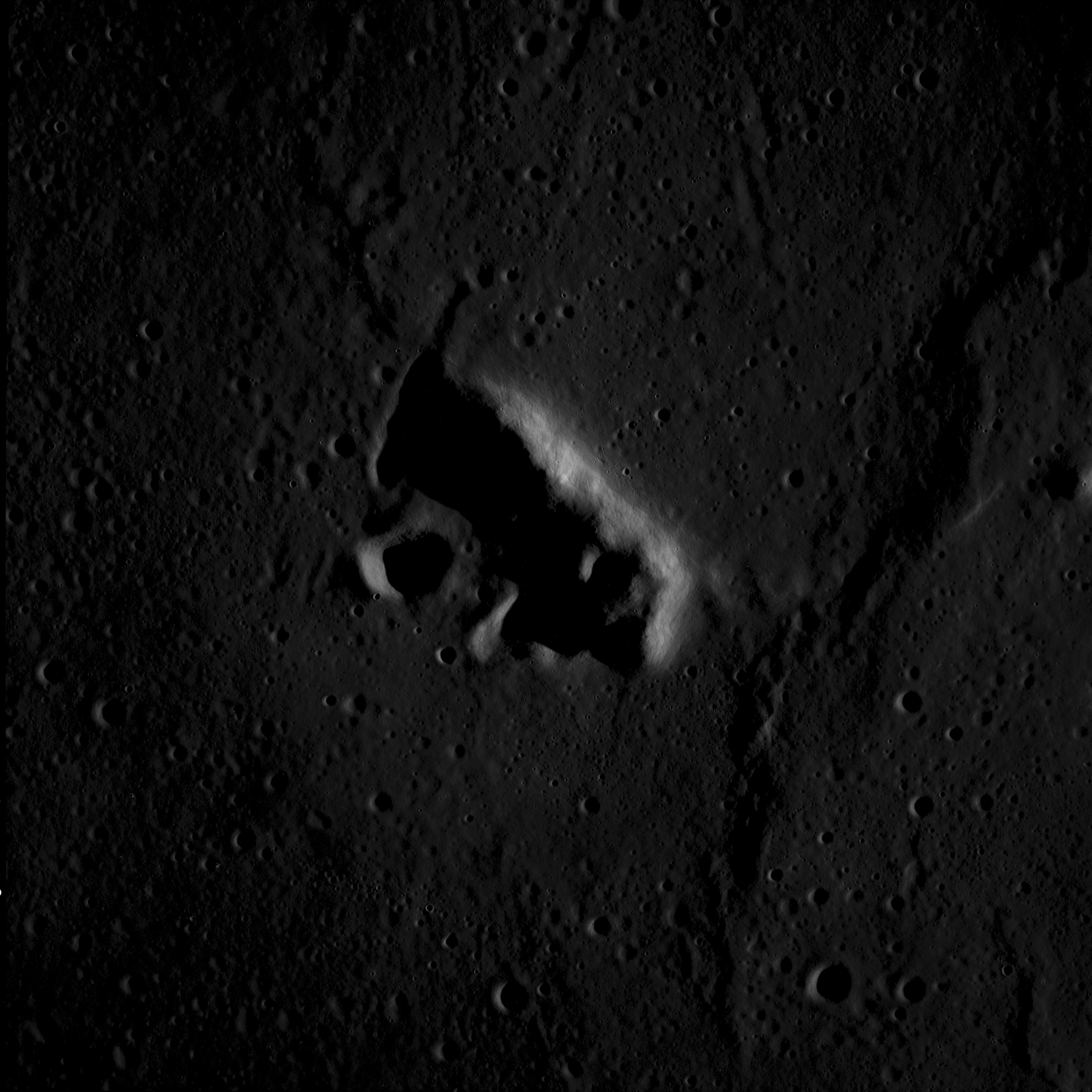
- Apollo 11 image

Highest point
- Listing: Lunar mountains
- Coordinates: 0.06°N 29.55°E

Geography
- Location: Mare Tranquillitatis, the Moon

Apollo 11 sequence approaching Boot Hill (right) and Duke Island (left)

Duke Island (Maskelyne phi) is a small lunar mountain that is located in Mare Tranquillitatis, about 64 km southwest of the crater Maskelyne, and about 188 km east of the Apollo 11 landing site.

Unlike many other lunar features named by the Apollo astronauts, the name of the mountain is not formally recognized by the International Astronomical Union. However, Duke Island and other informal features such as nearby Boot Hill or Mount Marilyn (within Montes Secchi) were significant landmarks used by the astronauts for navigation to the first landing site. "Duke" refers to astronaut Charlie Duke, who was CAPCOM during the Apollo 11 landing and lunar module pilot of Apollo 16.

== See also ==
- List of mountains on the Moon
