= Aryabhata (crater) =

Crater on the Moon

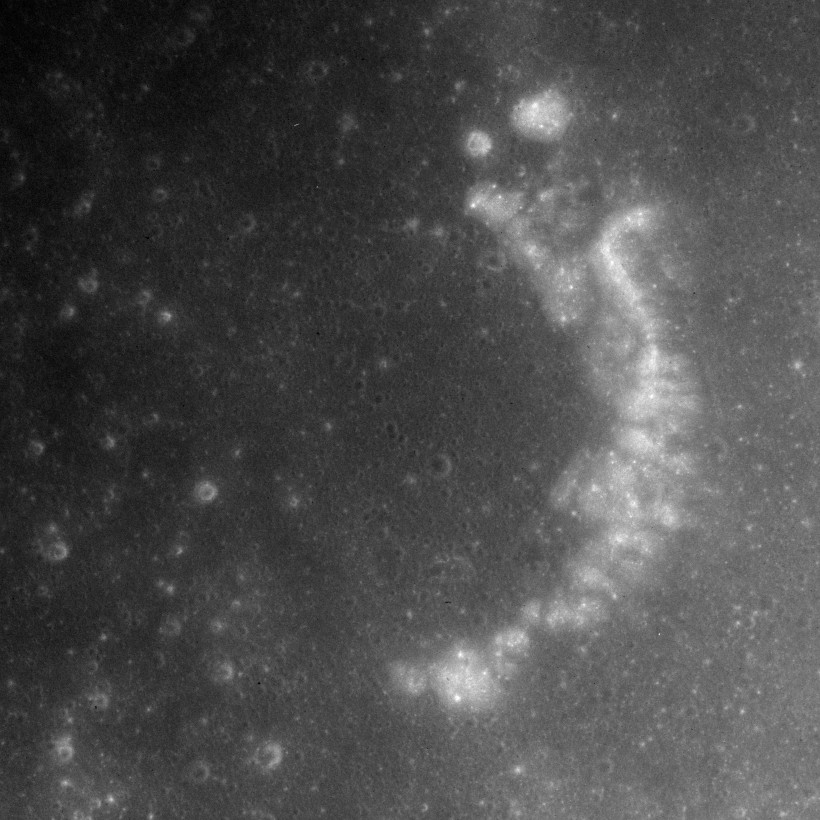
- Apollo 15 image
- Coordinates: 6.2°N 35.1°E
- Diameter: 21.89 km (13.60 mi)
- Colongitude: 356° at sunrise
- Eponym: Aryabhata

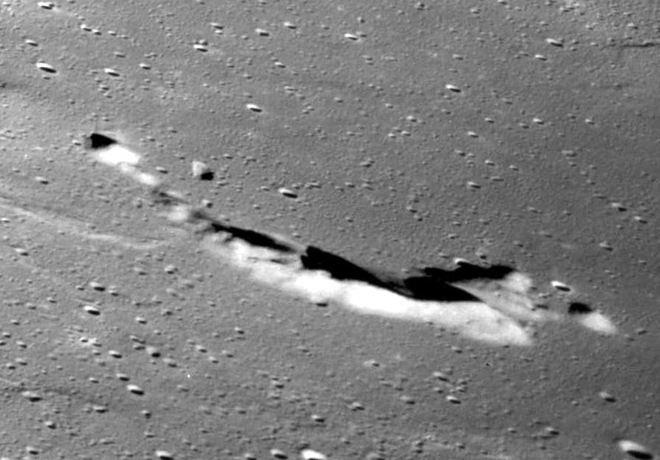
Oblique view from Apollo 8, facing west

Aryabhata is the remnant of a lunar impact crater located in the eastern Mare Tranquillitatis. The crater has been almost submerged by lava-flow, and now only an arc-shaped ridge formed from the eastern half of the rim remains above the lunar mare. Maskelyne crater itself is to the southwest. Several lunar domes are located on the mare nearby.

Previously identified as Maskelyne E, it was named after Indian astronomer and mathematician Aryabhata (476-c.550). This designation was officially adopted by the IAU in 1979.
