= Boot Hill (lunar mountain) =

Mountain on the Moon

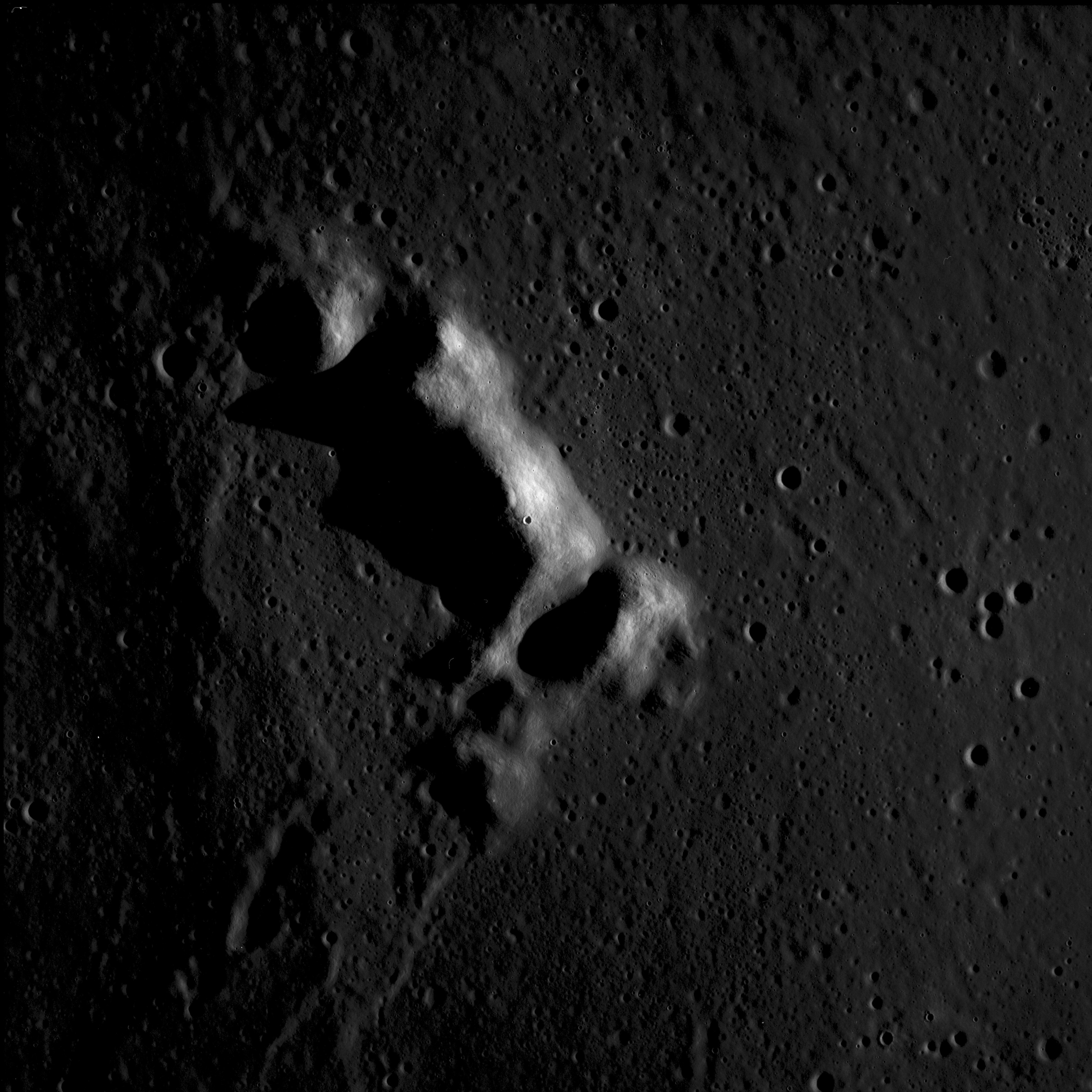
- Apollo 11 image

Highest point
- Elevation: 5905 m
- Listing: Lunar mountains
- Coordinates: 0.6°N 30.22°E

Geography
- Location: Mare Tranquillitatis, the Moon

Apollo 11 sequence approaching Boot Hill (right) and Duke Island (left)

Boot Hill (Maskelyne theta) is a small lunar mountain that is located in Mare Tranquillitatis, about 45 km south of the crater Maskelyne, and about 210 km east of the Apollo 11 landing site. The peak at its north end rises approximately 230 m above the surrounding mare.

Unlike many other lunar features named by the Apollo astronauts, the name of the mountain is not formally recognized by the International Astronomical Union. However, Boot Hill and other informal features such as the nearby Duke Island or Mount Marilyn (within Montes Secchi) were significant landmarks used by the astronauts for navigation to the first landing site.

== See also ==
- List of mountains on the Moon
