= Aemilius Magnus Arborius =

4th century Gallo-Roman Latin poet and rhetorician

Aemilius Magnus Arborius (4th century) was a Gallo-Roman Latin poet and professor. He was the author of a poem in ninety-two lines in elegiac verse, titled Ad Nympham nimis cultam, which cleverly alludes to Classical authors. The poem was reprinted in several later anthologies. Arborius was a rhetorician at Tolosa (Toulouse) in Gaul. He was the maternal uncle of the poet Ausonius, who in his Parentalia praises him and mentions that he enjoyed the friendship of the brothers of the emperor Constantine I, when they lived at Tolosa, and was afterwards called to Constantinople to superintend the education of one of the Caesars.
