= Pierre Willems =

Dutch philologist and historian

Pierre Willems (January 6, 1840, in Maastricht – February 23, 1898, in Leuven) was a Dutch philologist and historian of Ancient Rome.

Following the custom of Belgian students he did not confine himself to the courses at Catholic University of Leuven (French: Louvain) but went to Paris to hear Julius Oppert, Émile Egger, and Henri Patin, and to Berlin, Utrecht, and Leyden, where he followed the courses of Cobet. On his return in 1865 he was appointed professor of Latin philology at the Catholic University of Leuven; here he spent the remainder of his life, the only events being his lectures and his works.

His two chief works are Le droit public romain (Roman Public Law), first issued under the title, Les antiquités romains envisagées au point de vue des institutions politiques (Louvain, 1870; 7th ed. by his son Joseph Willems, Louvain, 1910), and Le sénat de la republique romaine (3 vols., Louvain, 1878–85). The first work is a handbook which stops at Constantine I in the first three editions and now goes as far as Justinian I. The author combined systematic and historical order by dividing the history of Roman institutions into "epochs" and "periods", viz., epoch of royalty, epoch of the republic, epoch of the empire, subdivided into the period of the Principate and that of monarchy. In each of these sections Willems studies the conditions of persons, government, and administration.

The book on the Roman Senate shows more evidence of personal research. It contains a new opinion concerning the recruiting of the Senate; Willems does not admit that there were plebeian senators in the century following the expulsion of the kings. It was by the exercise of the curule magistracies that the plebs entered the Senate, in fact after 354–200; a plebiscite proposed by the Tribune Ovinius and accepted at the end of the fourth century hastened the introduction of the plebeians, and, in short, made the Senate an assembly of former magistrates.

He completed his work by a series of studies on the composition of the Roman Senate in 575–179, in 699–55 in his great work, and in A. D. 65 in the Musée belge (published by his son, 1902). He also contributed to the Bulletins of the Brussels Academy a memoir on the municipal elections of Pompeii (1902). He assisted in the foundation of the second Belgian periodical for classical philology, Le Musée belge (1897), and organized a Societas philologa, at Louvain, one of the oldest members of which was the Liège professor, Charles Michel, author of the Recucit d'inscriptions grecques (1900–12). He belonged to the Flemish party and collected materials for a work on the Flemish dialects, which remains unfinished.
