= Censorinus =

3rd-century Roman writer and grammarian

Censorinus (fl. c. 238) was a Roman grammarian and miscellaneous writer.

== Name ==
From its grammatical form, Censorinus is presumably his cognomen, the shared surname of a branch of a Roman family (gens). The cognomen Censorinus would typically be used by those descended from, adopted by, or related by prominent marriage to someone who had held the office of censor. Censorinus's given name (praenomen) and family name (nomen) are unknown, although the Marcii Censorini were by far the most prominent family to use the cognomen. The author is sometimes distinguished as Censorinus the Grammarian (Censorinus Grammaticus).

== Life ==
Little is known of Censorinus, although he lived during the 3rd century and apparently dedicated De Die Natali to his patron Quintus Caerellius as a birthday gift.

== Works ==
Censorinus was the author of a lost work De Accentibus as well as the surviving De Die Natali.

De Die Natali (Note: Sometimes—mistakenly—given as De Die Natale.) (Latin for "On the Natal Day" or "On the Birthday") or Opusculum de Die Natali ("Little Work on the Birthday") was apparently written in 238 for the birthday of Censorinus's patron Quintus Caerellius. The book covers many topics: the natural history of man, the influence of the stars and genii, music, religious rites, astronomy, the doctrines of the Greek philosophers, and antiquarian subjects. The second part deals with chronological and mathematical questions, and has been useful for modern scholars to determine principal epochs of ancient history. The chief authorities used were Varro and Suetonius. Some scholars hold that the entire work is practically an adaptation of the lost Pratum of Suetonius. The fragments of a work De Naturali Institutione, dealing with astronomy, geometry, music, and versification, and usually printed with the De Die Natali of Censorinus, are not by him. Part of the original manuscript, containing the end of the genuine work, and the title and name of the author of the fragment are lost.

== Legacy ==
A bright crater in the Sea of Tranquility on the Moon has been named after him.
