= Ausonius =

Late Roman poet

Decimus Magnus Ausonius
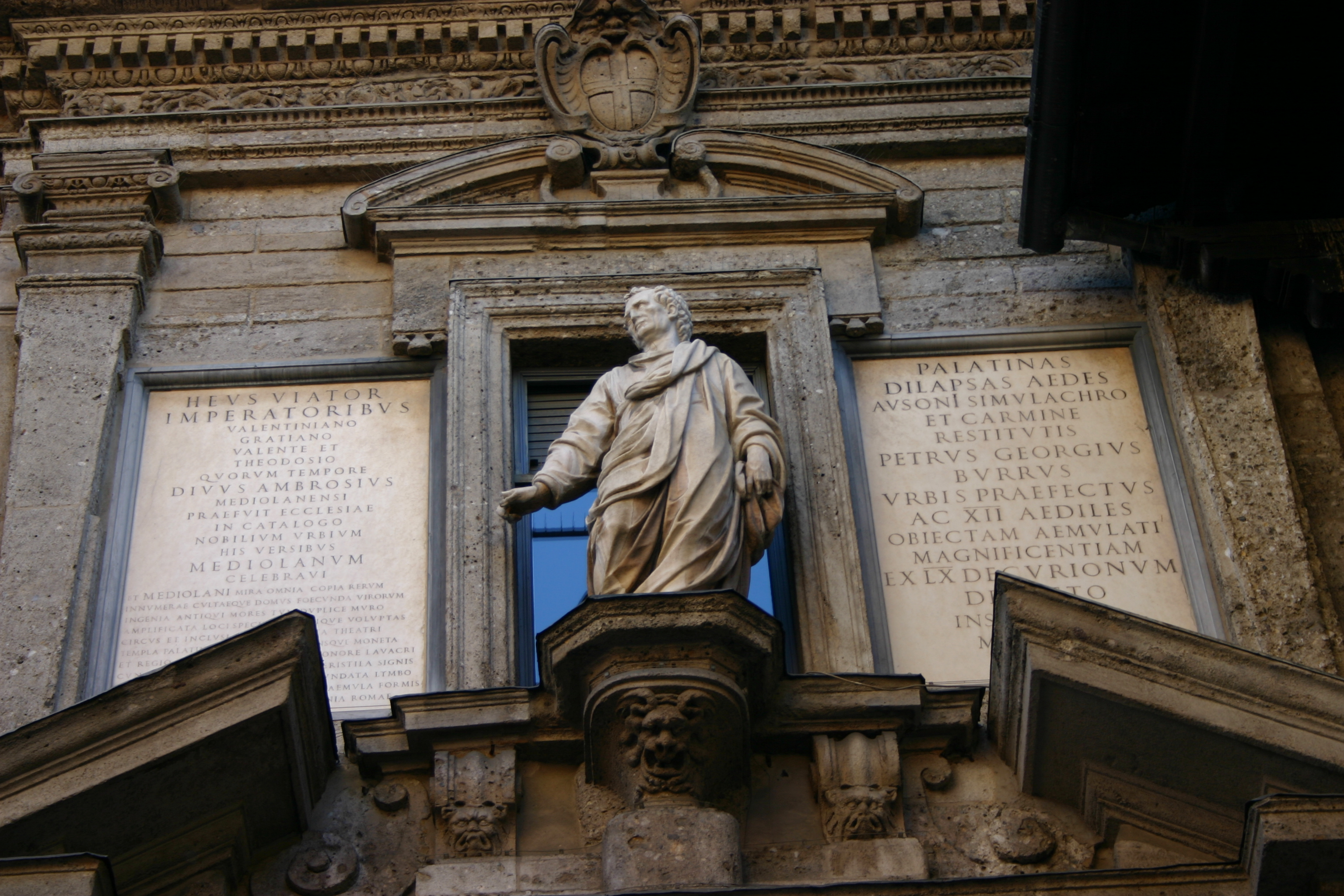
- Monument to Ausonius in Milan
- Born: c. 310; Burdigala
- Died: c. 395
- Occupations: poet, teacher
- Relatives: Aemilia Hilaria (aunt); Aemilius Magnus Arborius (uncle); Paulinus of Pella (grandson)

Decimus Magnus Ausonius (/ɔːˈsoʊniəs/; c. 310 – c. 395) was a Roman poet and teacher of rhetoric from Burdigala, Aquitaine (now Bordeaux, France). For a time, he was tutor to the future Emperor Gratian, who afterwards bestowed the consulship on him. His best-known poems are Mosella, a description of the River Moselle, and Ephemeris, an account of a typical day in his life. His many other verses show his concern for his family, friends, teachers and circle of well-to-do acquaintances and his delight in the technical handling of meter.

== Biography ==
Decimus Magnus Ausonius was born in c. 310 in Burdigala (now Bordeaux), the son of Julius Ausonius (c. 290 – 378), a physician of Greek ancestry, and Aemilia Aeonia, daughter of Caecilius Argicius Arborius, descended on both sides from established, land-owning Gallo-Roman families of southwestern Gaul.

Ausonius was given a strict upbringing by his aunt and grandmother, both named Aemilia. He received an excellent education at Bordeaux and at Toulouse, where his maternal uncle, Aemilius Magnus Arborius, was a professor. Ausonius did well in grammar and rhetoric, but professed that his progress in Greek was unsatisfactory. In 328 Arborius was summoned to Constantinople to become tutor to Constans, the youngest son of Constantine the Great, whereupon Ausonius returned to Bordeaux to complete his education under the rhetorician Minervius Alcimus. He had a sister, Dryadia, who lived to 60, a sister Aemilia Melania, who died in infancy, as well as a younger brother Avitianus, who died before reaching puberty, whom Ausonius laments in his Parentalia.

Having completed his studies, he trained for some time as an advocate, but he preferred teaching. In 334 he became a grammaticus (instructor) at a school of rhetoric in Bordeaux and afterwards a rhetor or professor. His teaching attracted many pupils, some of whom became eminent in public life. His most famous pupil was the poet Paulinus, who later became a Christian and Bishop of Nola.

After thirty years of that work, Ausonius was summoned by Emperor Valentinian I to teach his son, Gratian, the heir-apparent. When Valentinian took Gratian on the German campaigns of 368–369, Ausonius accompanied them. Ausonius turned literary skill into political capital. In recognition of his services emperor Valentinian bestowed on Ausonius the rank of quaestor. His presence at court gave Ausonius the opportunity to connect with a number of influential people. In 369, he met Quintus Aurelius Symmachus; their friendship proved mutually beneficial.

Gratian liked and respected his tutor, and when he became emperor in 375, he began bestowing on Ausonius and his family the highest civil honors. That year Ausonius was made Praetorian Prefect of Gaul, campaigned against the Alemanni and received as part of his booty a slave girl, Bissula (to whom he addressed a poem), and his father, though nearly ninety years old, was given the rank of prefect of Illyricum.

In 376 Ausonius's son, Hesperius, was made proconsul of Africa. In 379 Ausonius was awarded the consulate, the highest Roman honour.

In 383, the army of Britain, led by Magnus Maximus, revolted against Gratian and assassinated him at Lyons; and when Emperor Valentinian II was driven out of Italy, Ausonius retired to his estates near Burdigala (now Bordeaux), in Gaul. Magnus Maximus was overthrown by Emperor Theodosius I in 388, but Ausonius did not leave his country estates. They were, he says, his nidus senectutis, the "nest of his old age", and there, he spent the rest of his days, composing poetry and writing to many eminent contemporaries, several of whom had been his pupils. His estates supposedly included the land now owned by Château Ausone, which takes its name from him.

Ausonius appears to have been a late convert to Christianity. He died about 395.

His grandson, Paulinus of Pella, was also a poet. His works attest to the devastation that Ausonius's Gaul would face soon after his death.

== List of works ==
- Epigrammata Ausonii de diversis rebus. About 120 epigrams on various topics.
- Ephemeris. A description of the occupations of the day from morning to evening, in various meters, composed before 367. Only the beginning and the end are preserved.
- Parentalia. 30 poems of various lengths, mostly in elegiac meter, on deceased relations that were composed after his consulate, when he had already been a widower for 36 years.
- Commemoratio professorum Burdigalensium or Professores. A continuation of the Parentalia, dealing with the famous teachers of his native Bordeaux whom he had known.
- Epitaphia. 26 epitaphs of heroes from the Trojan War translated from Greek
- Caesares. On the 12 emperors described by Suetonius.
- Ordo urbium nobilium. 14 pieces, dealing with 17 towns (Rome to Bordeaux), in hexameters, and composed after the downfall of Maximus in 388.
- Ludus VII Sapientium. A kind of puppet play in which the seven wise men appear successively and have their say.
- The so-called Idyllia. 20 pieces are grouped under this arbitrary title, the most famous of which is the Mosella. It also includes:
  - Griphus ternarii numeri
  - De aetatibus Hesiodon
  - Monosticha de aerumnis Herculis
  - De ambiguitate eligendae vitae
  - De viro bono
  - EST et NON
  - De rosis nascentibus (dubious)
  - Versus paschales
  - Epicedion in patrem
  - Technopaegnion
  - Cento nuptialis. A cento composed of lines and half-lines of Vergil.
  - Bissula
  - Protrepticus
  - Genethliacon
- Eglogarum liber. A collection of all kinds of astronomical and astrological versifications in epic and elegiac meter.
- Epistolarum liber. 25 verse letters in various meters.
- Ad Gratianum gratiarum actio pro consulatu. Prose speech of thanks to the emperor Gratian on the occasion of attaining the consulship, delivered at Treves in 379.
- Periochae Homeri Iliadis et Odyssiae. A prose summary of Homer's Iliad and Odyssey, attributed to but probably not written by Ausonius.
- Praefatiunculae. Prefaces by the poet to various collections of his poems, including a response to the emperor Theodosius I's request for his poems.

== Characteristics of works ==
Although admired by his contemporaries, the writings of Ausonius have not since been ranked among Latin literature's finest. His style is easy and fluent, and his Mosella is appreciated for its evocation of the life and the country along the River Moselle, but he is considered derivative and unoriginal. Edward Gibbon pronounced in his Decline and Fall of the Roman Empire that "the poetical fame of Ausonius condemns the taste of his age". However, Ausonius's works have several points of interest:

- His references to winemaking are frequently cited by historians as early evidence of large-scale viticulture in the now-famous wine country around his native Bordeaux.
- His contribution to the carpe diem topic (if the following poem is indeed his):

Collige, virgo, rosas, dum flos novus et nova pubes
et memor esto aevum sic properare tuum.

— Epigrammata: «Rosae» 2:49
Translation:

Gather, girl, roses while the flower is fresh and fresh is youth,
remembering that your own time is hurrying on.

- His somewhat unique Cento Nuptialis, in which he fulfils an imperial commission to compose an epithalamium using the "love is war" trope by writing it in the form of a cento (in other words, a mashup) lifting lines from Vergil:

Itque reditque viam totiens | uteroque recusso
transadigit costas | et pectine pulsat eburno.
Iamque fere spatio extremo fessique sub ipsam
finem adventabant: | tum creber anhelitus artus
aridaque ora quatit, sudor fluit undique rivis,
labitur exsanguis, | destillat ab inguine virus.

Translation:

Back and forth he plies his path and, the cavity reverberating,
thrusts between the bones, and strikes with ivory quill.
And now, their journey covered, wearily they neared
their very goal: then rapid breathing shakes his limbs
and parched mouth, his sweat in rivers flows;
down he slumps bloodless; the fluid drips from his groin.

== Saw mill ==
Scheme of a water-driven Roman sawmill at Hierapolis, Asia Minor. The 3rd-century mill is the earliest known machine to incorporate a crank and connecting rod mechanism.

His writings are also remarkable for mentioning in passing the working of a water mill sawing marble on a tributary of the Moselle:

....renowned is Celbis for glorious fish, and that other, as he turns his mill-stones in furious revolutions and drives the shrieking saws through smooth blocks of marble, hears from either bank a ceaseless din...

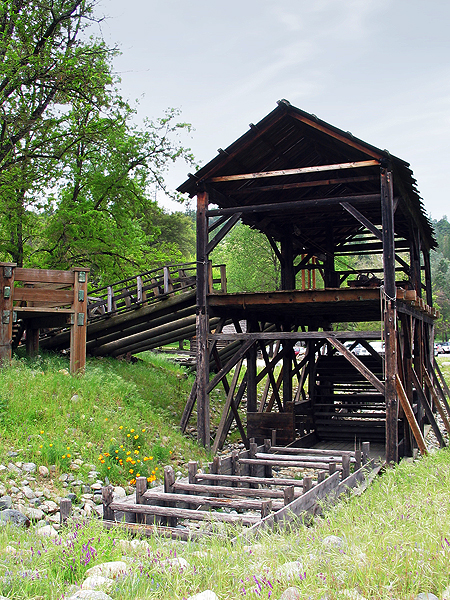
Modern reconstruction of Sutter's Mill, a water-powered 19th-century California sawmill.

The excerpt sheds new light on the development of Roman technology in using water power for different applications. It is one of the rare references in Roman literature to water mills used to cut stone, but that is a logical consequence of the application of water power to mechanical sawing of stone and presumably wood also. Earlier references to the widespread use of mills occur in Vitruvius in his De Architectura of c. 25 BC, and the Naturalis Historia of Pliny the Elder published in 77 AD. Such applications of mills would multiply after the fall of the empire through the Middle Ages into the modern era. The mills at Barbegal, in southern France, are famous for their application of water power to grinding grain to make flour and were built in the 1st century AD. They consisted of 16 mills in a parallel sequence on a hill near Arles.

The construction of a saw mill is even simpler than a flour or grinding mill since no gearing is needed, and the rotary saw blade can be driven directly from the water wheel axle, as the example of Sutter's Mill, California, shows. However, a different mechanism is shown by the sawmill at Hieropolis, Asia Minor, involving a frame saw that is operated by a crank and connecting rod.

== See also ==
- Ausones, Ausonia
- Cento (poetry)
- Château Ausone
- French wine
- List of wine personalities
- Roman aqueducts
- Roman engineering
- Roman technology
- Tiberianus
- Watermills

== Notes ==
Political offices
Preceded by Valens; Valentinian II	Roman consul 379 with Q. Clodius Hermogenianus Olybrius	Succeeded by Gratian; Theodosius I
