= June 25 (Eastern Orthodox liturgics) =

Day in the Eastern Orthodox liturgical calendar

Eastern Orthodox liturgical calendar
June 24	June 25	June 26
June 25 O.S. ≍ July 8 N.S. June 25 N.S ≍ June 12 O.S.

An Eastern Orthodox cross

June 25 in Eastern Orthodox liturgical calendars is a feast day and a day of commemoration of saints and martyrs. Although some Orthodox churches use the Revised Julian Calendar and others use the traditional Julian calendar, the fixed commemorations for their respective June 25 are broadly the same, no matter which calendar is used. (Note: Despite the dates being the same, the days to which they refer typically differ by 13 days. The notation Old Style or O.S. is sometimes used to indicate a date in the traditional Julian Calendar (the "Old Calendar"). The notation New Style or N.S. indicates a date in the Revised Julian calendar (the "New Calendar").)

== Saints ==
- Virgin-martyrs Libya, Leonis, and Eutropa, of Palermo in Sicily (303)
- Virgin-martyr Febronia of Nisibis (304) (Note: "At Sibapolis, in Syria, under the governor Lysimachus, in the persecution of Diocletian, St. Febronia, virgin and martyr, who was scourged and racked for defending her faith and her chastity, then torn with iron combs and exposed to fire. Finally, having her teeth plucked out and her breasts cut off, she was condemned to capital punishment, and went to her spouse adorned with her sufferings as with so many jewels.")
- Martyr Gallicanus the Patrician, in Egypt (362) (Note: An officer in the army of Constantine and a consul in Rome, he went to live in Ostia where he founded a hospital and ministered to the sick.) (Note: "At Alexandria, St. Gallicanus, ex-consul and martyr, who had been honored with a triumph, and was held in affection by the emperor Constantine. Converted by Saints John and Paul, he withdrew to Ostia with St. Hilarinus, and devoted himself entirely to the duties of hospitality and to the service of the sick. The report of such an event spread through the whole world, and from all sides many persons came to see a man who had been a senator and consul, washing the feet of the poor, preparing their table, serving them, carefully waiting on the infirm, and performing other works of mercy. Driven from this place by Julian the Apostate, he repaired to Alexandria, where, for refusing to sacrifice to idols, at the command of the judge Raucian, he was put to the sword, and thus became a martyr of Christ.")
- Martyrs Orentius, Pharnacius, Eros, Firmus, Firminus, Cyriacus, and Longinus, near Lazica (4th century) (see also: June 24 )
- Venerable Symeon of Sinai (5th century) (Note: Some of his writings are found in the Evergetinos.)
- Venerable Martyrios, Bishop. (Note: He is referenced in the Jerusalemitic Canonarion, without any other details given.)

== Pre-Schism Western saints ==
- Saint Prosper of Reggio, Bishop of Reggio in Emilia in Italy (c. 466)
- Saint Maximus of Turin, Bishop of Turin during the barbarian invasions of the north of Italy (470) (Note: He is remembered for his homilies and other ascetic writings, which survive.) (Note: "At Turin, the birthday of St. Maximus, bishop and confessor, most celebrated for his learning and sanctity.")
- Saint Salomon of Cornwall, by tradition born in Cornwall, the husband of St Gwen and father of St Cuby (Cybi), he lived in Brittany and was murdered by heathen (5th century)
- Saint Gallicanus II, fifth Bishop of Embrun in France (c. 541)
- Saint Moluac (Moluag, Molonachus, Moloc of Mortlach), a disciple of St Brendan, he became Bishop of Lismore in Argyle in Scotland, Apostle to the Picts (592) (Note: Born in Scotland, he went to Ireland and then returned to his native land as a missionary. His main work as a bishop was the enlightenment of the Hebrides. After founding an island monastery on the Isle of Lismore, Moluag went on to found two other great centres in the land of the Picts at Rosemarkie and Mortlach. These were his three centres of teaching, and all three were to become the seats of the Catholic Sees of the Isles, Ross and Aberdeen. It is claimed in the biography of Saint Malachy that Moluag was the founder of 100 monasteries in Dark Ages Scotland. He died in Rossmarkie but his shrine was in Mortlach.)
- Saint Selyf (Selyr, Levan), a hermit in St Levan in Cornwall (6th century)
- Saint Adalbert of Egmond, hierodeacon (710 or 740) (Note: Born in Northumbria in England, he became a monk at Rathmelgisi in Ireland and accompanied St Willibrord as a deacon to Frisia. He worked around Egmont in Holland and became the patron-saint there.) (Note: "In Holland, St. Adelbert, confessor, disciple of the sainted bishop Willibrord.")
- Virgin-martyr Eurosia (Orosia), at Jaca, Spain (714) (Note: Born in Bayonne in France, she was martyred by the Saracens in Jaca in the Pyrenees in Spain. She was also venerated in the south of France and in the north of Italy.)
- Saint Gohardus, Bishop of Nantes in France, martyred by raiding Normans while celebrating the liturgy (843) (Note: Many monks and priests suffered with him.)
- Saint Solomon III, King of Brittany, a brave warrior against Franks and Northmen alike, martyr (874) (Note: King of Brittany and a brave warrior against Franks and Northmen alike. The Bretons count him among their national heroes. He repented for the crimes of his youth and when he was murdered, he was proclaimed a martyr.)

== Post-Schism Orthodox saints ==
- Venerables Holy Prince Peter and Princess Febronia (tonsured David and Euphrosyne), wonderworkers of Murom (1228) (Note: See: (in Russian) Пётр и Феврония. Википедии. (Russian Wikipedia).)
- Saint Theoleptus of Philadelphia, Metropolitan of Philadelphia (1322)
- Venerables Dionysius (c. 1389) and Dometius (1405-1410) of Dionysiou Monastery, Mount Athos.
- Saint Dalmatus, founder of the Dormition Monastery in Siberia (1697) (Note: See: (in Russian) Далмат Исетский. Википедии. (Russian Wikipedia).)
- Venerable Methodios of Nyvritos, near Gortyn in Crete, ascetic (17th century) (Note: He was acquainted with Venerable Nicholas of Courtaliatis in Crete, monk (†1670) — September 1.)
- New Monk-martyr Procopius of Varna and Mt. Athos, at Smyrna (1810)
- New Martyr George of Attalia, at Krene in Asia Minor (1823)
- Saint Cyprian, hieromonk of Svyatogorsk Monastery (1874)

=== New martyrs and confessors ===
- New Hieromartyr Basil Militsyn, Priest (1918)
- New Hiero-confessor Nikon (Belyaev), Hieromonk of Optina Monastery (1931) (Note: See: (in Russian) Никон Оптинский. Википедии. (Russian Wikipedia).)
- New Hieromartyr Basil Protopopov, Priest (1940)

== Other commemorations ==
- Repose of Hierodeacon Serapion of Glinsk Hermitage (1859)

== Icon gallery ==
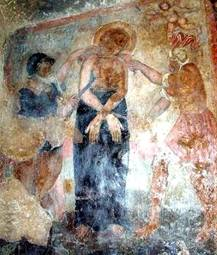
Martyrdom of Saint Febronia (Byzantine Monastery of St. Febronia, Palagonia)

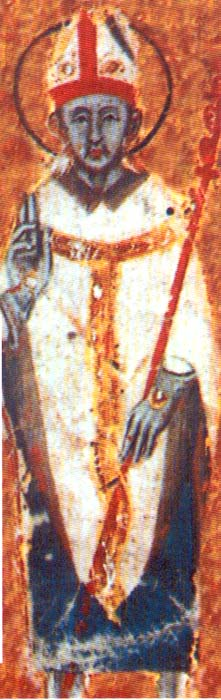
St. Maximus of Turin, Bishop of Turin.

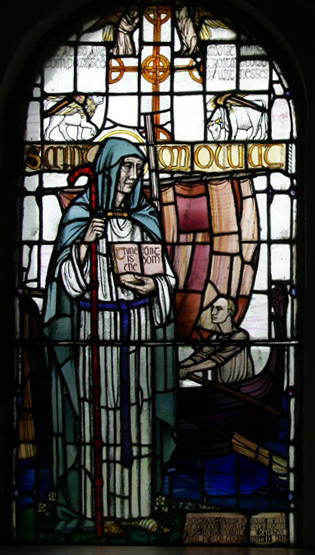
St. Moluac, Bishop of Lismore, Apostle of the Picts.

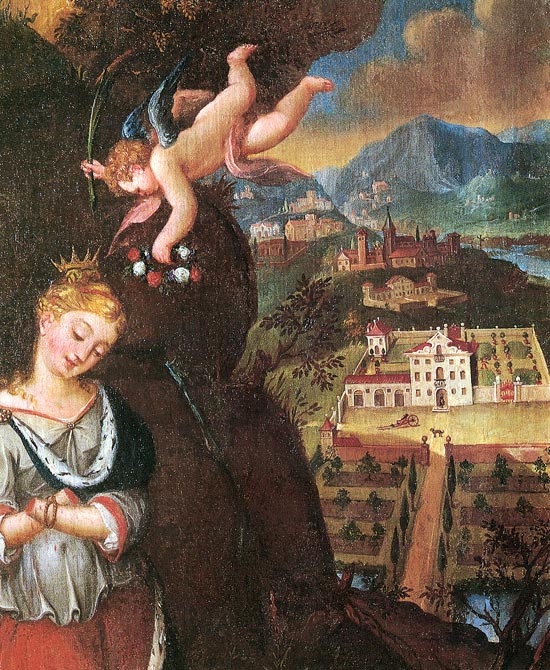
Virgin-martyr Eurosia, whose hands have been cut off.

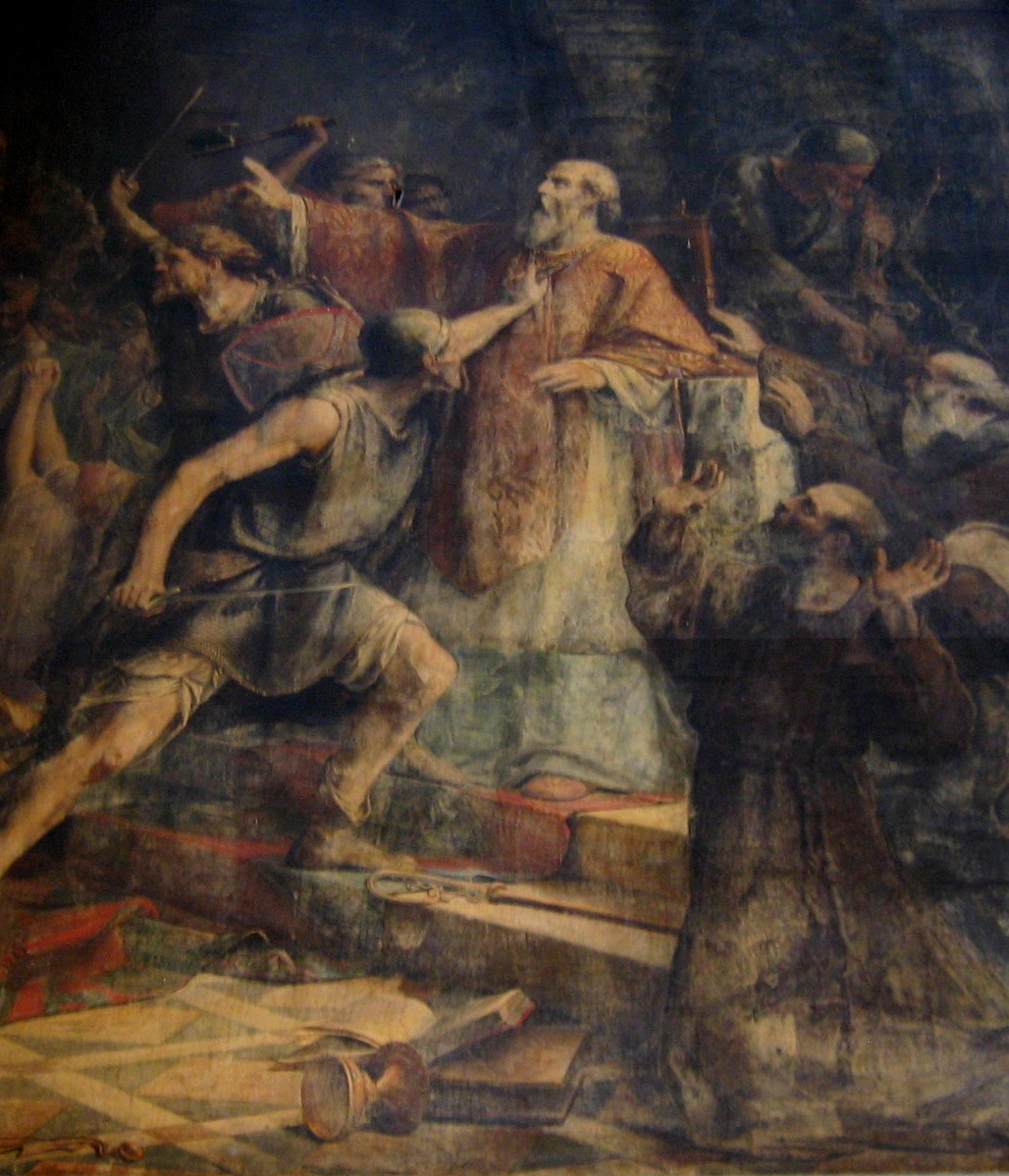
St. Gohardus martyred by the Normans.

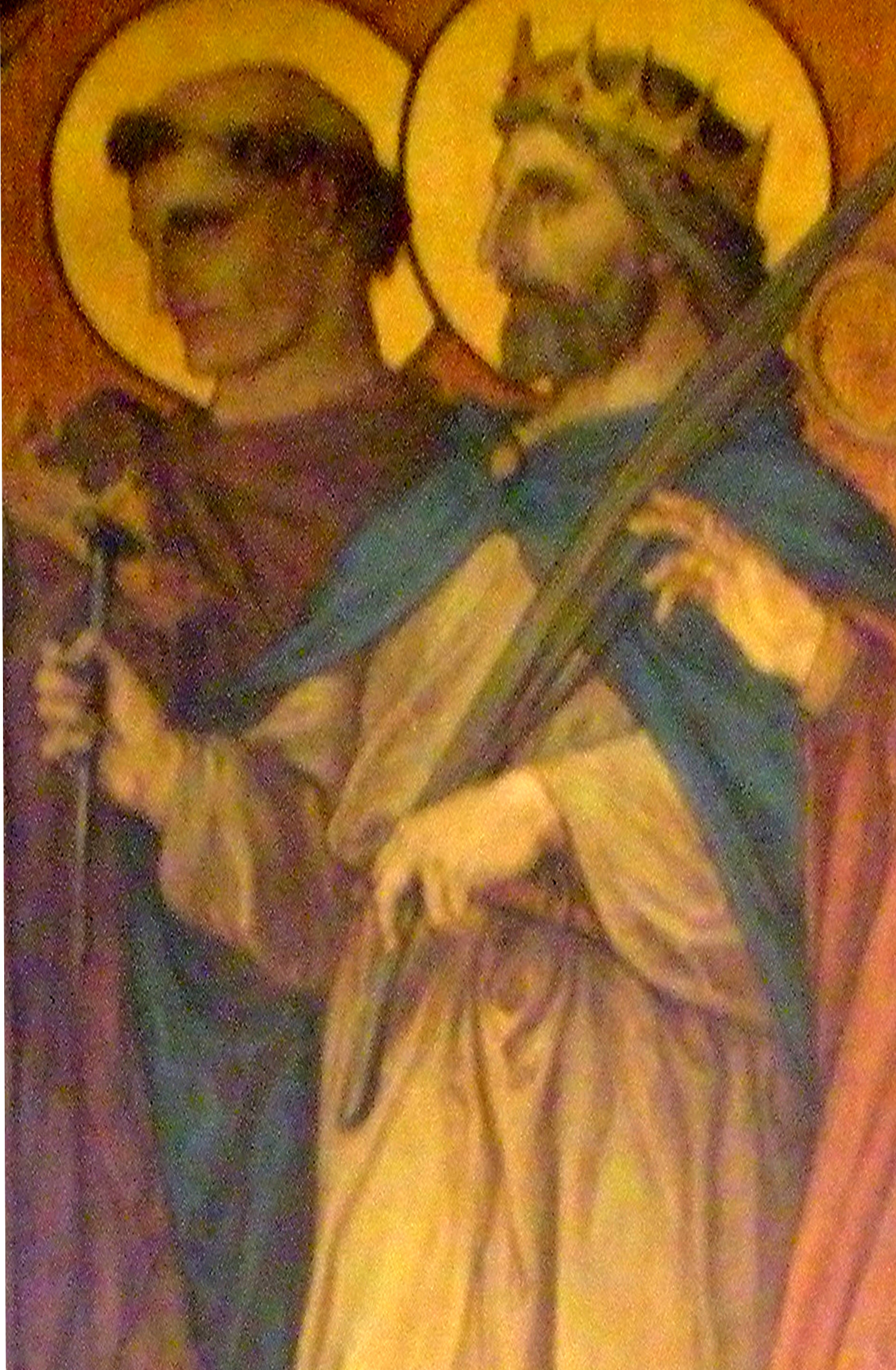
St. Solomon III, King of Brittany.

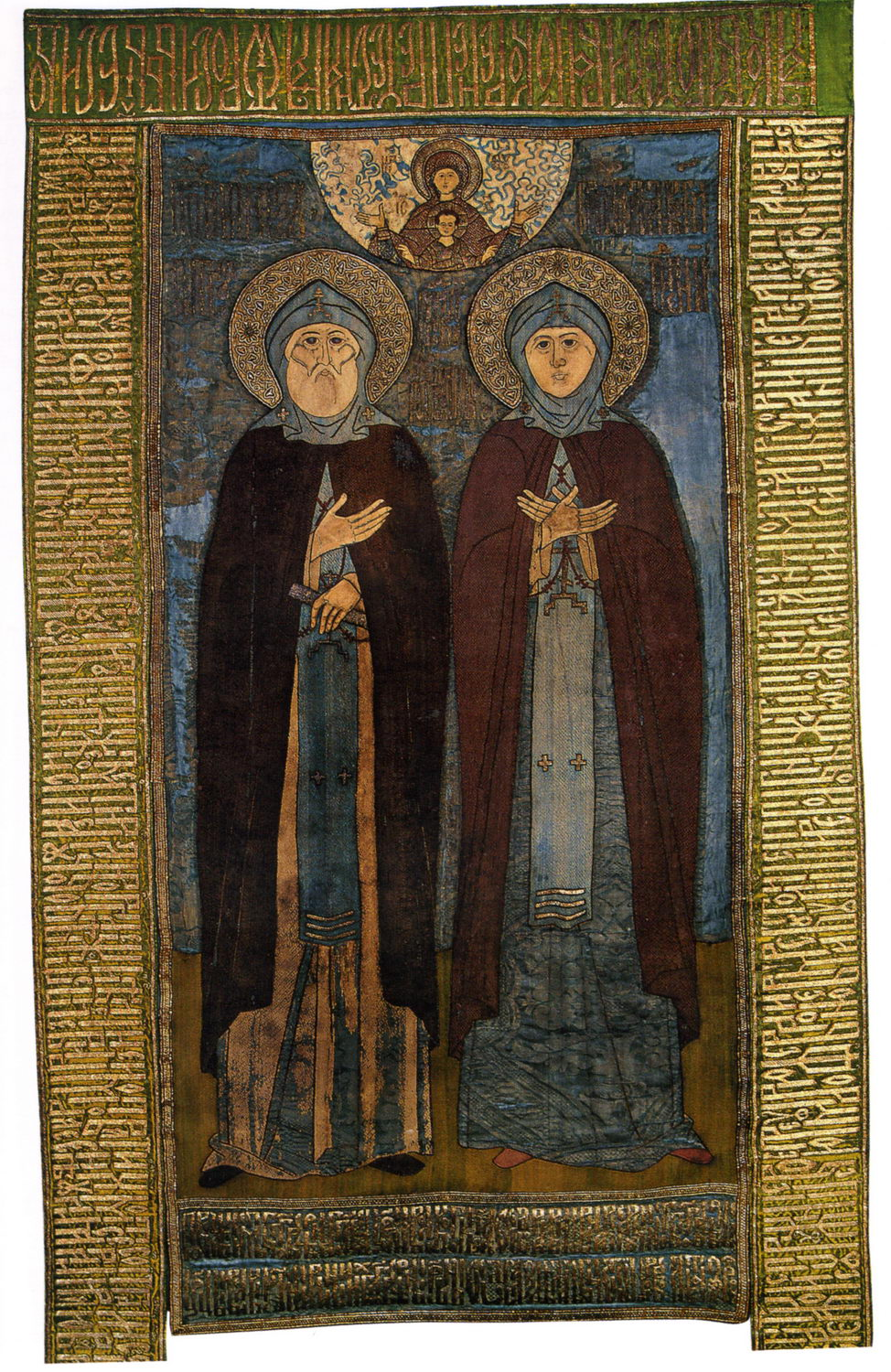
Venerables Holy Prince Peter and Princess Febronia.

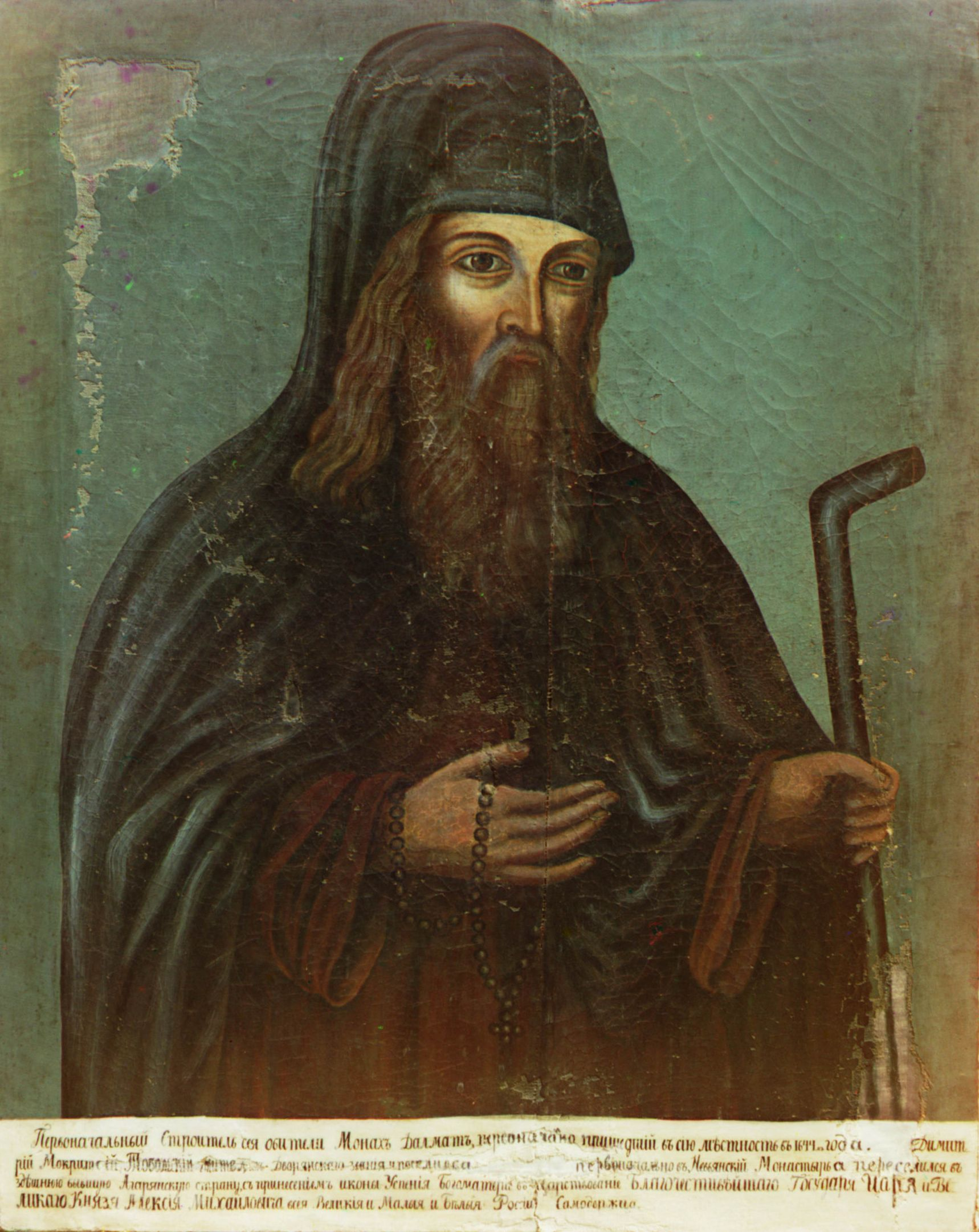
Saint Dalmatus, founder of the Dormition Monastery in Siberia.

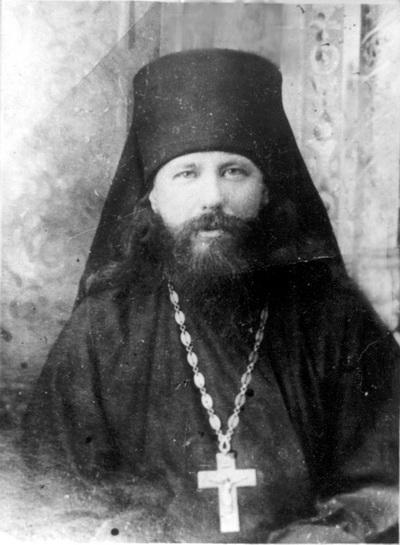
New Hiero-confessor Nikon (Belyaev), Hieromonk of Optina Monastery.

== Sources ==
- June 25/July 8. Orthodox Calendar (PRAVOSLAVIE.RU).
- July 8 / June 25. HOLY TRINITY RUSSIAN ORTHODOX CHURCH (A parish of the Patriarchate of Moscow).
- June 25. OCA - The Lives of the Saints.
- The Autonomous Orthodox Metropolia of Western Europe and the Americas (ROCOR). St. Hilarion Calendar of Saints for the year of our Lord 2004. St. Hilarion Press (Austin, TX). p. 47.
- The Twenty-Fifth Day of the Month of June. Orthodoxy in China.
- June 25. Latin Saints of the Orthodox Patriarchate of Rome.
- The Roman Martyrology. Transl. by the Archbishop of Baltimore. Last Edition, According to the Copy Printed at Rome in 1914. Revised Edition, with the Imprimatur of His Eminence Cardinal Gibbons. Baltimore: John Murphy Company, 1916. pp. 184–186.
- Rev. Richard Stanton. A Menology of England and Wales, or, Brief Memorials of the Ancient British and English Saints Arranged According to the Calendar, Together with the Martyrs of the 16th and 17th Centuries. London: Burns & Oates, 1892. pp. 288–290.

Greek Sources

- Great Synaxaristes: (in Greek) 25 ΙΟΥΝΙΟΥ. ΜΕΓΑΣ ΣΥΝΑΞΑΡΙΣΤΗΣ.
- (in Greek) Συναξαριστής. 25 Ιουνίου. ECCLESIA.GR. (H ΕΚΚΛΗΣΙΑ ΤΗΣ ΕΛΛΑΔΟΣ).
- (in Greek) 25 Ιουνίου. Αποστολική Διακονία της Εκκλησίας της Ελλάδος (Apostoliki Diakonia of the Church of Greece).
- (in Greek) 25/06/2018. Ορθόδοξος Συναξαριστής.

Russian Sources

- (in Russian) 8 июля (25 июня). Православная Энциклопедия под редакцией Патриарха Московского и всея Руси Кирилла (электронная версия). (Orthodox Encyclopedia - Pravenc.ru).
- (in Russian) 25 июня по старому стилю / 8 июля по новому стилю. Русская Православная Церковь - Православный церковный календарь на 2017 год.
- (in Russian) 25 июня (ст.ст.) 8 июля 2014 (нов. ст.). Русская Православная Церковь Отдел внешних церковных связей. (DECR).
