= June 26 (Eastern Orthodox liturgics) =

Day in the Eastern Orthodox liturgical calendar

Eastern Orthodox liturgical calendar
June 25	June 26	June 27
June 26 O.S. ≍ July 9 N.S. June 26 N.S ≍ June 13 O.S.

An Eastern Orthodox cross

June 26 in Eastern Orthodox liturgical calendars is a feast day and a day of commemoration of saints and martyrs. Although some Orthodox churches use the Revised Julian Calendar and others use the traditional Julian calendar, the fixed commemorations for their respective June 26 are broadly the same, no matter which calendar is used. (Note: Despite the dates being the same, the days to which they refer typically differ by 13 days. The notation Old Style or O.S. is sometimes used to indicate a date in the traditional Julian Calendar (the "Old Calendar"). The notation New Style or N.S. indicates a date in the Revised Julian calendar (the "New Calendar").)

== Saints ==
- Venerable David of Thessalonica (David the Dendrite) (540) (Note: "At Thessalonica, St. David, hermit.") (Note: "S. David, a hermit at Thessalonica, was so illustrious in the seventh century for his virtues that he became an object of public veneration, and was visited from all quarters. His words were listened to with the greatest attention, he was thought to prophesy, and to work miracles of healing. His powerful appeals to sinners caused the conversion of great numbers.") (Note: In 1236 the saints' relics were taken by Crusaders to Pavia, Italy and from there transferred to Milan in 1967. Finally on September 16, 1978 through the efforts of Metropolitan Panteleimon (Chrysofakis) of Thessalonica, the sacred relics of Saint David were triumphantly returned to Thessaloniki and housed in the Basilica of Saint Demetrios the Great Martyr. To celebrate this feast a Service was written by the renowned hymnographer Elder Gerasimos Mikragiannanitis. Eventually the relics were transferred to the Katholikon of the Monastery of Saint Theodora in the middle of Thessaloniki in a chapel surrounded by icons of the Saint's life.)
- Venerable John, Bishop of Gothia in the Crimea (c. 787)
- Venerable Anthion, ascetic.

== Pre-Schism Western saints ==
- Saints John and Paul, and Galicanus, martyrs who suffered in Rome. (c. 361-363) (Note: "AT Rome, on Mount Coelius, the holy martyrs John and Paul, brothers. The former was steward, the other secretary of the virgin Constantia, daughter of the emperor Constantine. Afterwards, under Julian the Apostate, they received the palm of martyrdom by being beheaded.")
- Saint Vigilius of Trent, a Roman noble who studied in Athens, he became Bishop of Trent in Italy and more or less succeeded in uprooting paganism (405) (Note: He was stoned to death in the Val di Rendena for overturning a statue of Saturn.) (Note: "At Trent, St. Vigilius, bishop, who, whilst he endeavored to root out the remains of idolatry, was overwhelmed with a shower of stones by cruel and barbarous men, and thus endured martyrdom for the name of Christ.")
- Saint Maxentius (Maixent), born in Agde in France, he became a monk at a monastery in Poitou, now called Saint-Maixent, where he later became abbot (c. 515) (Note: He was highly esteemed by the local population whom he protected from the invading barbarians.) (Note: "In Poitou, St. Maxentius, priest and confessor, renowned for miracles.")
- Saint Barbolenus, a monk at Luxeuil Abbey and afterwards first Abbot of St Peter's, later St Maur-des-Fossés, in the north of France (c. 677)
- Saint Perseveranda (Pecinna, Pezaine), a holy virgin from Spain (c. 726) (Note: A holy virgin from Spain who with her sisters Macrina and Columba travelled to Poitiers in France where they founded a convent. While fleeing from a robber, Perseveranda died at a place called after her, Sainte-Pezaine.) (Note: "The same day, St. Perseveranda, virgin.")
- Saints Salvius and Superius (c. 768) (Note: Salvius was a bishop near Angouleme in France who was sent to Valenciennes to enlighten the Flemish. The greed of a noble led to his death and he was hastily buried beneath a martyred companion. When the relics were discovered his anonymous companion was found first and called 'Superius'.) (Note: "At Valenciennes, the holy martyrs Salvius, bishop of Angouleme, and Superius.") (Note: "When Archbishop Lanfranc was rebuilding the Cathedral of Canterbury, William the Conqueror with much zeal promoted the great work, and showed special favour to the church, restoring to it many possessions which had been confiscated. Among other gifts he bestowed on the new church were the head and principal bones of ST. SALVIUS the Martyr, whose body he had brought from the Continent. This Salvius was Bishop of Angouleme, who had travelled to Valenciennes, in the time of Charles Martel or of Charles the Great, and was most maliciously put to death, together with his companion, by one of the officers of the Treasury.")
- Saint Corbican, born in Ireland, he lived as a hermit in Holland and helped simple people (8th century) (Note: "Few traditions of any importance relate to this saint. In his Menologium Scotorum, Thomas Dempster has entered a festival at the 26th of June for a St. Corbicanus, whom he makes a companion of St. Adalgisus, Apostle in Belgium. He is believed to have been an Irishman, who came to the Low Countries, and who lived as a solitary. Ferrarius citing a Scottish Martyrology, it is supposed from a suggestion furnished by Camerarius — who passes over Corbicanus — has a feast for him at this date. The Bollandists note this entry, but they state, that Corbican was unknown to the Belgians, as also to the writers of the Life of St. Adalgisus. The Petits Bollandistes notice St. Corbican, an Irishman, at the 26th of June, and they state, that he flourished in the Low Countries, during the eighth century. He is said to have lived on roots and herbs, while instructing the rude peasantry in the word of God. He was afflicted with cramps and agues until he died.")
- Martyr Pelagius of Córdoba (Pelayo), a young boy from Asturias in Spain left as a hostage with the Moors in Cordoba (925) (Note: He was offered freedom and other rewards if he would accept Islam. These inducements were repeatedly put before him during the three years that he was kept in prison. On his stubborn refusal, he was tortured, which he endured for six hours before finally reposing. His relics were transferred to Leon in 967 and to Oviedo in 985.) (Note: "At Cordova, in Spain, under the Saracen king Abderahman, the birthday of St. Pelagius, a young man who gloriously consummated his martyrdom for the faith by having his flesh torn to pieces with iron pincers.")
- Saint Hermogius, founder of Labrugia Monastery in Spanish Galicia (c. 942) (Note: Born in Tuy in Spain, he founded the monastery of Labrugia in Galicia in 915. He was taken prisoner by the Moors and taken to Cordoba, but was later freed. His nephew, St Pelagius, was kept as a hostage.)

== Post-Schism Orthodox saints ==
- Saint Dionysius, Archbishop of Suzdal, then Metropolitan of Kiev and all Rus' (1385) (see also: October 15)
- New Martyr David of St. Anne’s Skete on Mount Athos, martyred in Thessaloniki (1813)

=== New martyrs and confessors ===
- New Hieromartyr George Stepanyuk, Priest (1918)

== Other commemorations ==
- Translation of the relics of Saint Brannock of Braunton (Brynach), Abbot of Braunton, Devonshire (6th century) (Note: Troparion of St Brannock of Braunton tone 1 "Righteous tutor of the children of Brychan and great wonderworker, O Father Brannock, thou didst win many souls for Christ by thy tireless endeavours. As Braunton's church may yet hold thy precious relics, Pray that we, being ever mindful of our Orthodox heritage, may never deviate from the true Faith and, thereby, receive the reward of the blest.") (see also: January 7)
- Uncovering of the relics (1569) of Saint Tikhon of Lukhov (1503) (Note: See: (in Russian) Тихон Луховской. Википедии. (Russian Wikipedia).)
- Translation of the relics (1995) of St. Nilus of Stolobny (1554) (Note: See: (in Russian) Нил Столобенский. Википедии. (Russian Wikipedia).) (see also: May 27)

=== Icons ===
- Icon of the Most Holy Theotokos "Of Lydda" or "The Roman" (1st century) (Note: See: (in Russian) Лиддская икона Божией Матери. Википедии. (Russian Wikipedia).)
- Icon of the Mother of God "Neamts" (1399)
- Icon of the Mother of God "Of the Seven Lakes", Kazan (17th century) (Note: See: (in Russian) Седмиозерная икона Божией Матери. Википедии. (Russian Wikipedia).)
- Appearance of the Tikhvin Icon of the Most Holy Theotokos (1383)

== Icon gallery ==
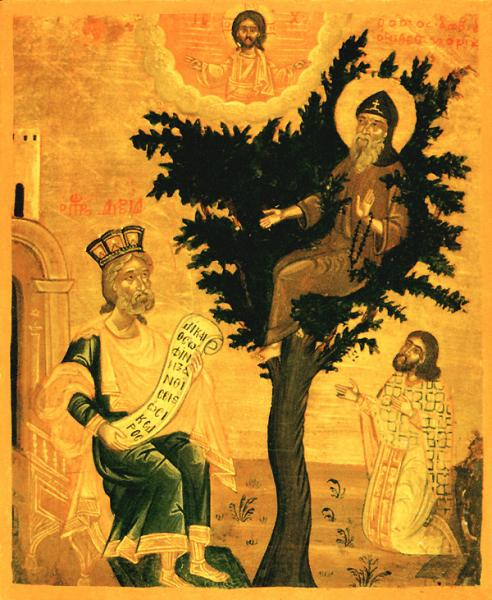
St. David of Thessalonica.

St. David of Thessalonica.
(Dionysiou Monastery).

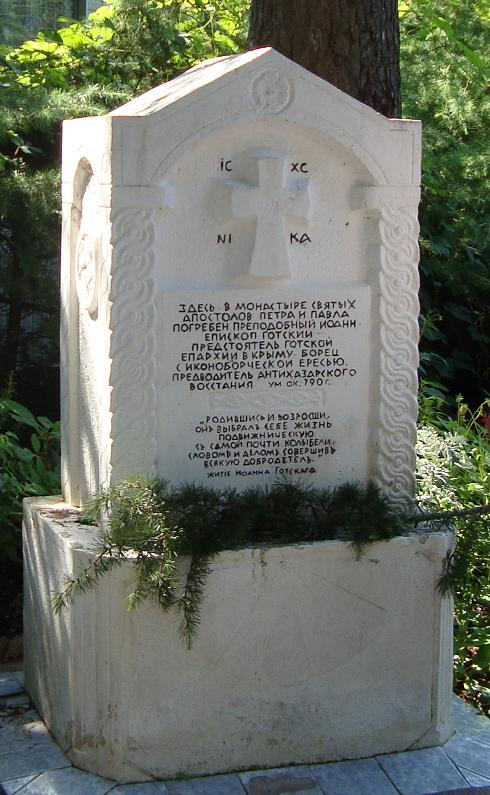
Memorial stone for St. John, Bishop of Gothia.

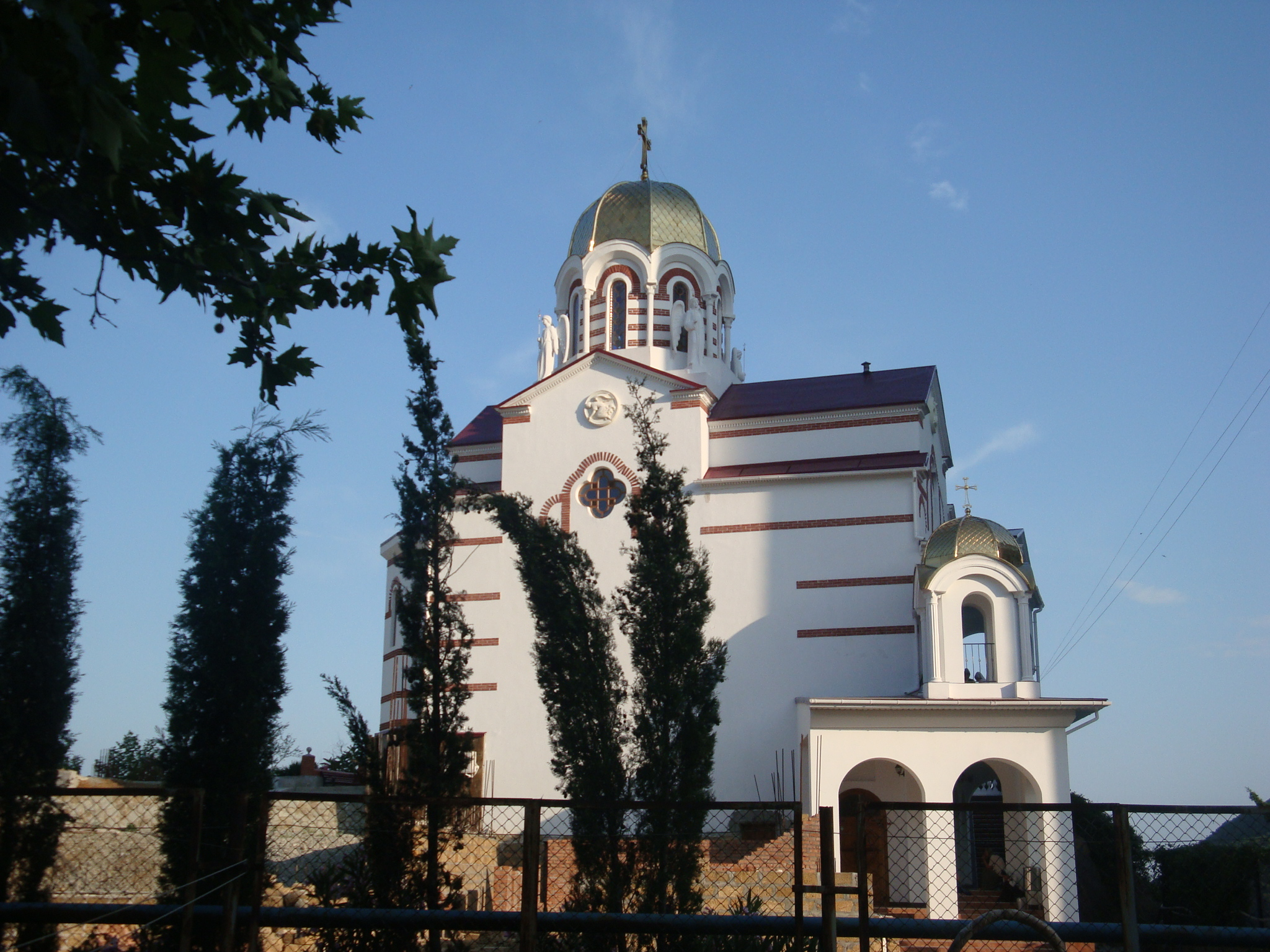
Orthodox Church of St. John of Gothia, in Partenit.

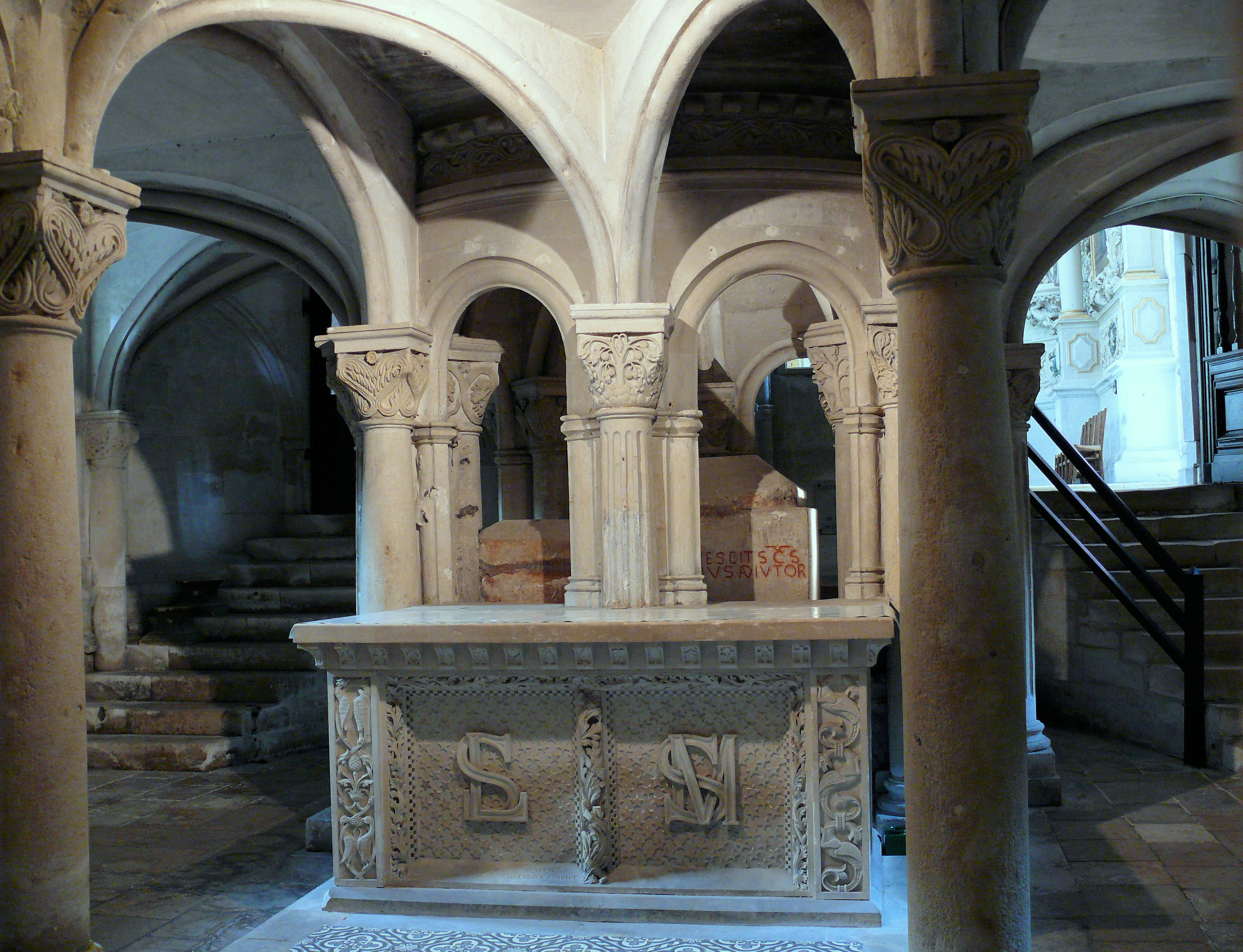
The crypt of St. Maxentius.
(Abbey of Saint-Maixent-l'École).

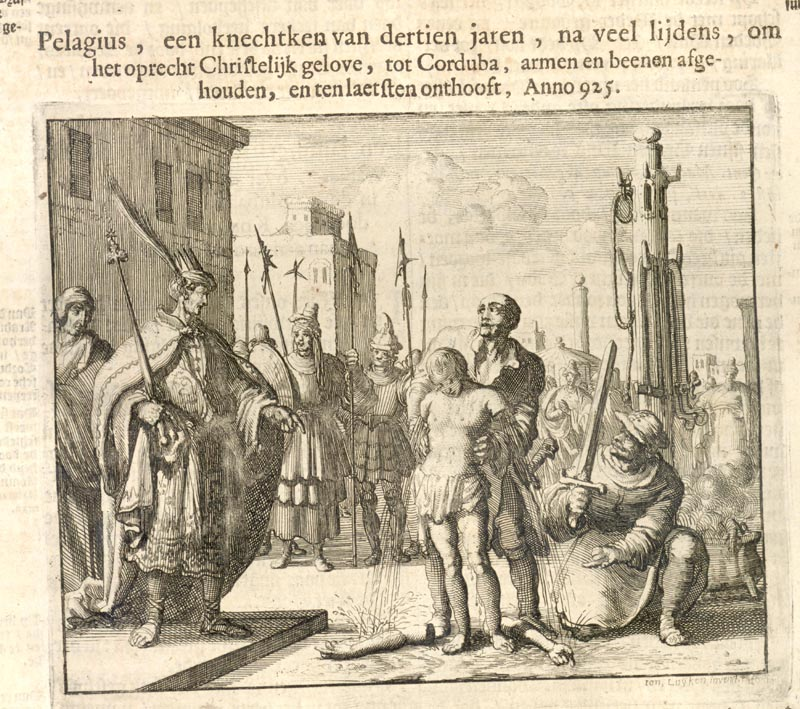
The martyrdom of St. Pelagius of Córdoba.

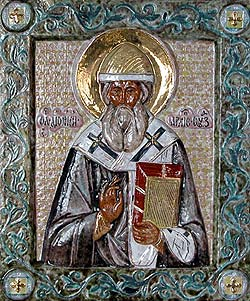
St. Dionysius, Metropolitan of Kiev and all Rus'.

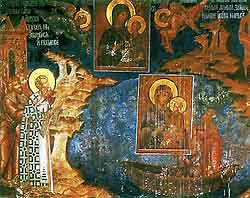
Patriarch Germanus I lowers the Lydda icon of the Virgin in the sea to save her from the iconoclasts.

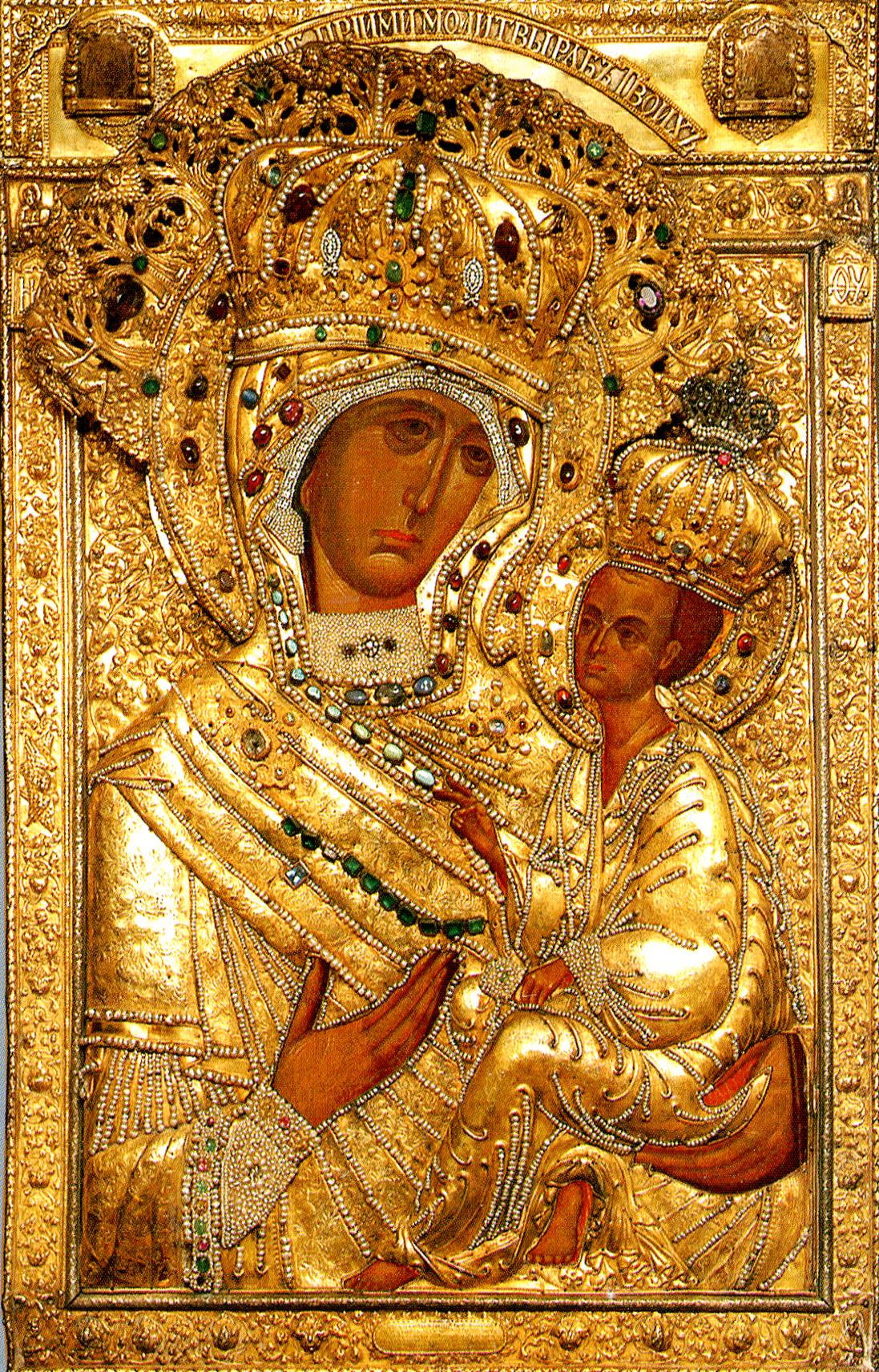
Theotokos of Tikhvin.

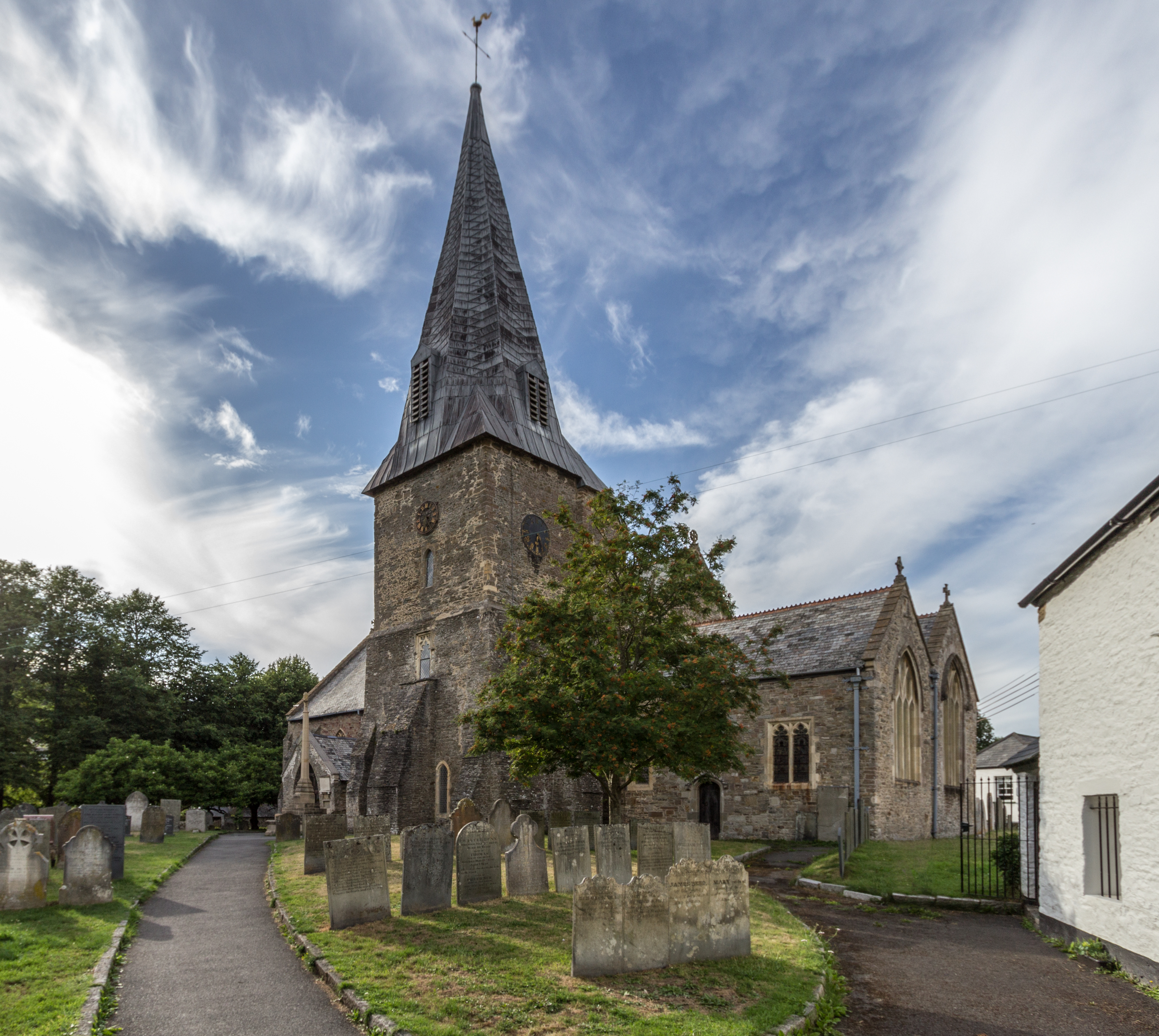
St. Brannock's Church, Braunton (Devon, UK).

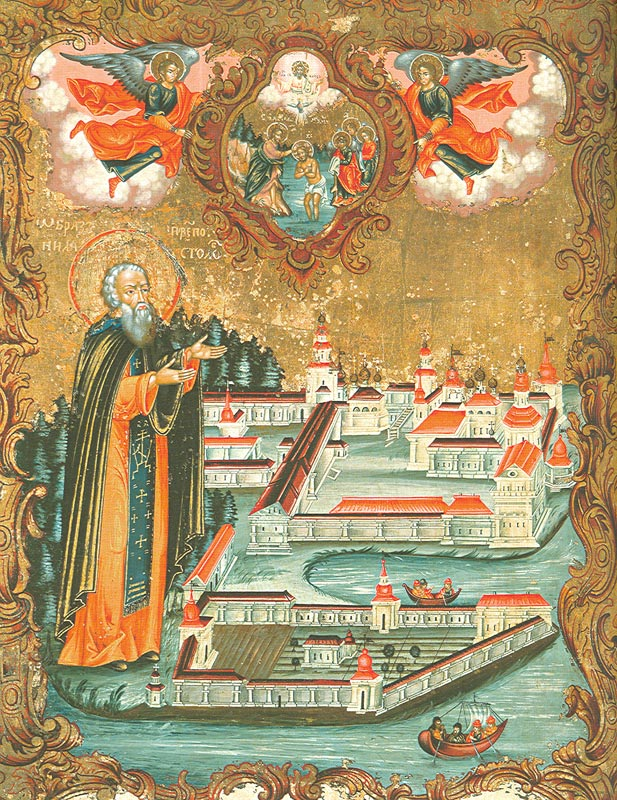
St. Nilus of Stolobny.

== Sources ==
- June 26/July 9. Orthodox Calendar (PRAVOSLAVIE.RU).
- July 9 / June 26. HOLY TRINITY RUSSIAN ORTHODOX CHURCH (A parish of the Patriarchate of Moscow).
- June 26. OCA - The Lives of the Saints.
- The Autonomous Orthodox Metropolia of Western Europe and the Americas (ROCOR). St. Hilarion Calendar of Saints for the year of our Lord 2004. St. Hilarion Press (Austin, TX). p. 47.
- The Twenty-Sixth Day of the Month of June. Orthodoxy in China.
- June 26. Latin Saints of the Orthodox Patriarchate of Rome.
- The Roman Martyrology. Transl. by the Archbishop of Baltimore. Last Edition, According to the Copy Printed at Rome in 1914. Revised Edition, with the Imprimatur of His Eminence Cardinal Gibbons. Baltimore: John Murphy Company, 1916. p. 186.
- Rev. Richard Stanton. A Menology of England and Wales, or, Brief Memorials of the Ancient British and English Saints Arranged According to the Calendar, Together with the Martyrs of the 16th and 17th Centuries. London: Burns & Oates, 1892. p. 291.

Greek Sources

- Great Synaxaristes: (in Greek) 26 ΙΟΥΝΙΟΥ. ΜΕΓΑΣ ΣΥΝΑΞΑΡΙΣΤΗΣ.
- (in Greek) Συναξαριστής. 26 Ιουνίου. ECCLESIA.GR. (H ΕΚΚΛΗΣΙΑ ΤΗΣ ΕΛΛΑΔΟΣ).
- (in Greek) 26 Ιουνίου. Αποστολική Διακονία της Εκκλησίας της Ελλάδος (Apostoliki Diakonia of the Church of Greece).
- (in Greek) 26/06/2018. Ορθόδοξος Συναξαριστής.

Russian Sources

- (in Russian) 9 июля (26 июня). Православная Энциклопедия под редакцией Патриарха Московского и всея Руси Кирилла (электронная версия). (Orthodox Encyclopedia - Pravenc.ru).
- (in Russian) 26 июня по старому стилю / 9 июля по новому стилю. Русская Православная Церковь - Православный церковный календарь на 2017 год.
- (in Russian) 26 июня (ст.ст.) 9 июля 2014 (нов. ст.). Русская Православная Церковь Отдел внешних церковных связей. (DECR).
