= June 24 (Eastern Orthodox liturgics) =

Day in the Eastern Orthodox liturgical calendar

Eastern Orthodox liturgical calendar
June 23	June 24	June 25
June 24 O.S. ≍ July 7 N.S. June 24 N.S ≍ June 11 O.S.

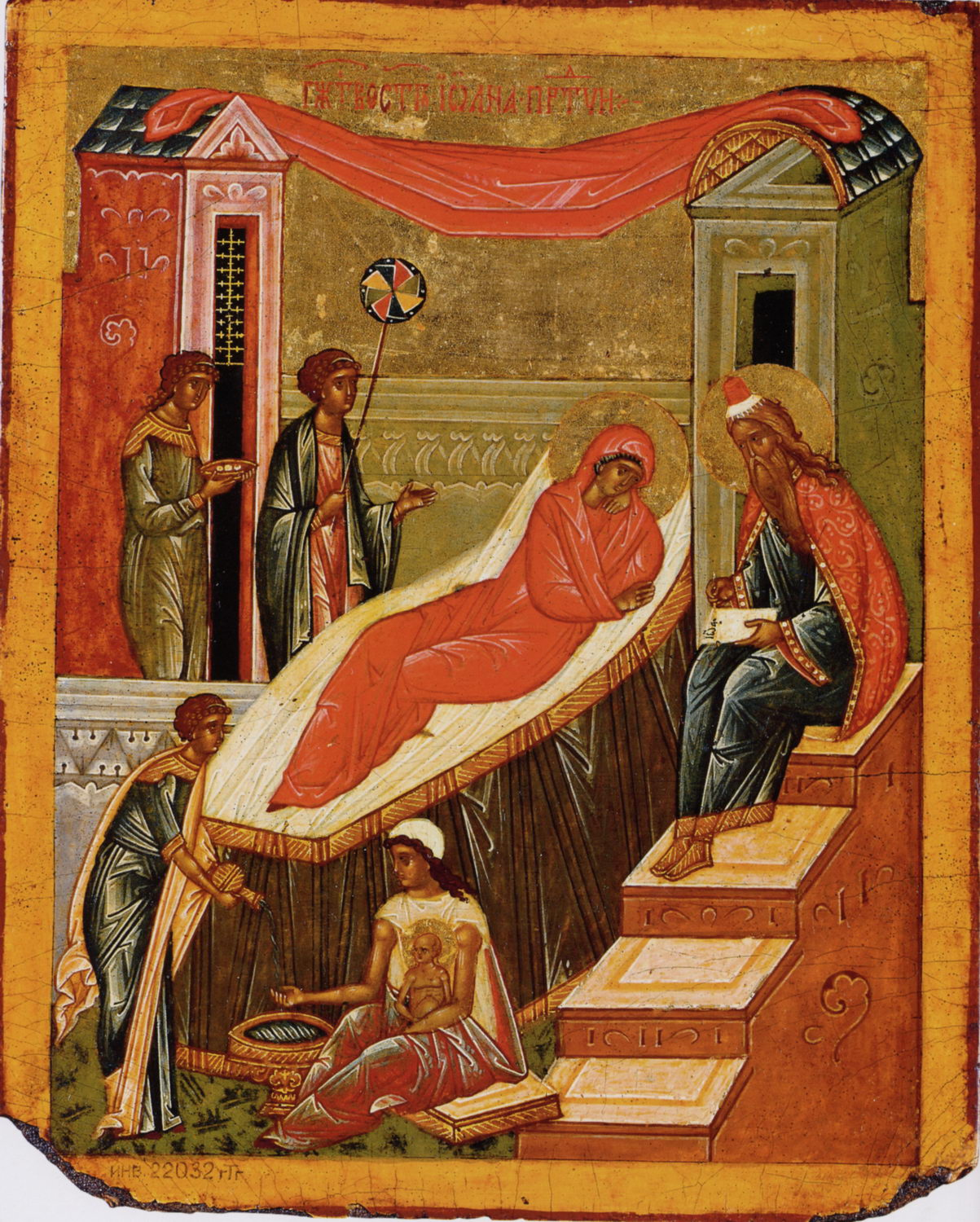
Icon of the Nativity of St. John the Baptist and Forerunner.

June 24 in Eastern Orthodox liturgical calendars is a feast day and a day of commemoration of saints and martyrs. Although some Orthodox churches use the Revised Julian Calendar and others use the traditional Julian calendar, the fixed commemorations for their respective June 24 are broadly the same, no matter which calendar is used. (Note: Despite the dates being the same, the days to which they refer typically differ by 13 days. The notation Old Style or O.S. is sometimes used to indicate a date in the traditional Julian Calendar (the "Old Calendar"). The notation New Style or N.S. indicates a date in the Revised Julian calendar (the "New Calendar").)

== Saints ==
- Nativity of St. John the Baptist and Forerunner. (Note: "THE Nativity of St. John the Baptist, precursor of our Lord, son of Zachary and Elizabeth, who, while yet in his mother's womb, was filled with the Holy Ghost.") (Note: Saint-Jean-Baptiste Day is a holiday celebrated on June 24 in the Canadian province of Quebec.)
- Martyrs Orentius, Pharnacius, Eros, Firmus, Firminus, Cyriacus, and Longinus, near Lazica (4th century) (Note: "At Satalis, in Armenia, seven saintly brothers, martyrs: Orentius, Heros, Pharnacius, Firminus, Firmus, Cyriacus and Longinus, who owe their martyrdom to the emperor Maximian. Because they were Christians, they were deprived of the military cincture by his command, separated from one another, hurried away to various places, and in the midst of painful trials, found their repose in the Lord.")
- Saint Nicetas of Remesiana, Bishop of Remesiana (Bela Palanka) (c. 414 or 420)

== Pre-Schism Western saints ==
- Saints Faustus and Companions, 24 martyrs in Rome. (Note: "In the same city, the holy martyrs Faustus and twenty-three others.")
- Saint Simplicius of Autun, a married man who lived a virginal life with his wife and became Bishop of Autun (c. 360) (Note: "At Autun, the demise of St. Simplicius, bishop and confessor." He worked zealously and successfully to uproot paganism in his diocese.)
- Saints Agoard, Agilbert and Companions, holy martyrs in Créteil, now a suburb of Paris in France (5th century) (Note: "In the diocese of Paris, at Creteil, the martyrdom of the Saints Agoardus and Aglibertus, with a multitude of others of both sexes.") (Note: See: (in French) Agoard et Agilbert de Créteil. Wikipédia. (French Wikipedia).)
- Venerable Germocus, born in Ireland, he was the brother of St Breaca and settled near Mount's Bay in Cornwall (6th century) (Note: The parish of Germoe is named after Saint Germocus, one of the companions of Saint Breage.)
- Saint Alena (Alina) of Brussels, martyred at Forest, Belgium (c. 640)
- Saint Rumbold of Mechelen (Rumoldus), a monk who became a bishop with St Willibrord in Holland and in Brabant in Belgium, murdered near Malines (c. 775)
- Saint Theodulphus (Thiou), third Abbot of Lobbes Abbey in Belgium (776)
- Venerable John the Hermit (Ivan), of Bohemia (845 or 904) (Note: He renounced a brilliant position at the court of Czechia to become a hermit. He was buried by St Ludmilla.)
- Saint Henry (Heric), born in Hery in Yonne in France, he became a monk at the Abbey of Saint-Germain d'Auxerre (c. 880)
- Saint John of Tuy, born in Galicia in Spain, he lived as a hermit near Tuy, where his relics are still enshrined (9th century)

== Post-Schism Orthodox saints ==
- Venerable Anthony of Dymsk, founder of Dymsk Monastery in Novgorod (1224) (Note: See: (in Russian) Антоний Дымский. Википедии. (Russian Wikipedia).)
- Saint Mikhail of Tver, Great Prince of Tver (1318)
- Saint John of Yaransk, monk at Solovki (1561)
- Righteous Youths John and James, of Meniugi in Novgorod (1566-1569) (Note: See: (in Russian) Иаков и Иоанн Менюжские. Википедии. (Russian Wikipedia).)
- Saint Athanasius of Paros (1813)
- Saint Gerasimus (Dobroserdov), Bishop of Astrakhan and Enotaeva (1880) (Note: See: (in Russian) Герасим (Добросердов). Википедии. (Russian Wikipedia).)

=== New martyrs and confessors ===
- New Martyr Panagiotes of Caesarea in Cappadocia, at Constantinople (1765)

== Other commemorations ==
- Synaxis of the Righteous Zechariah and Elizabeth, parents of John the Forerunner. (see also: September 5)
- Translation of the relics (1492) of Great-martyr John the New to Suceava, Romania (1330-1340) (see also: June 2 )

== Icon gallery ==
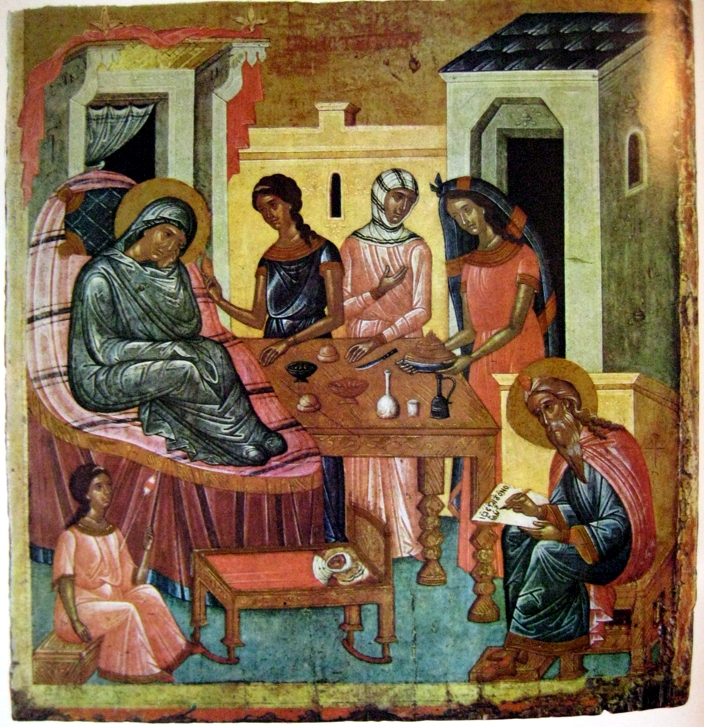
Nativity of St. John the Baptist and Forerunner.

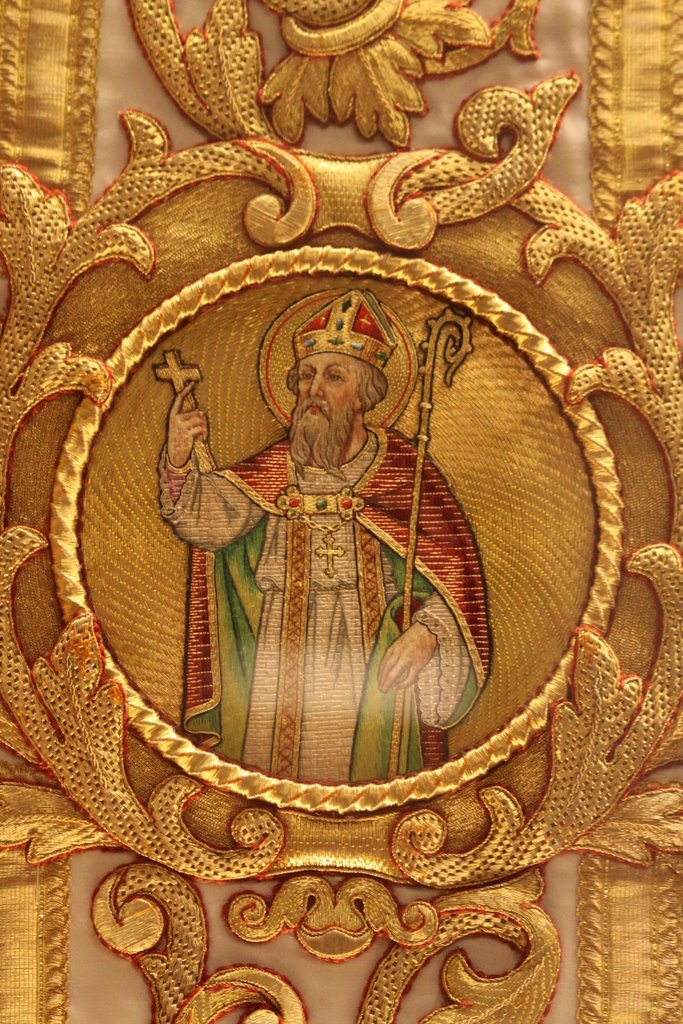
St. Rumbold of Mechelen.

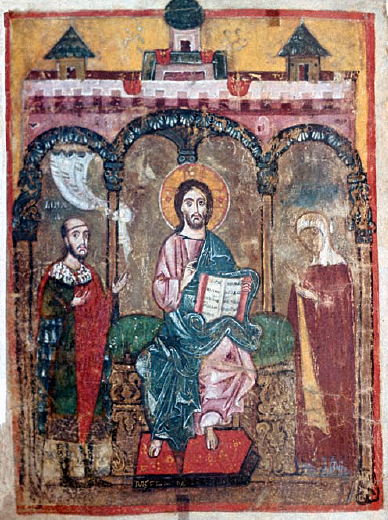
St. Mikhail Yaroslavich and his mother Xenia, facing Christ.

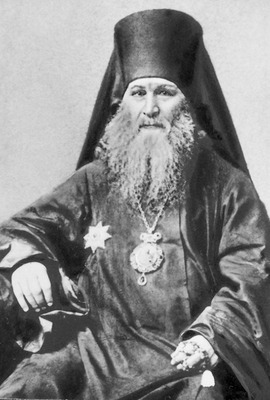
St. Gerasimus (Dobroserdov) of Astrakhan and Enotaeva.

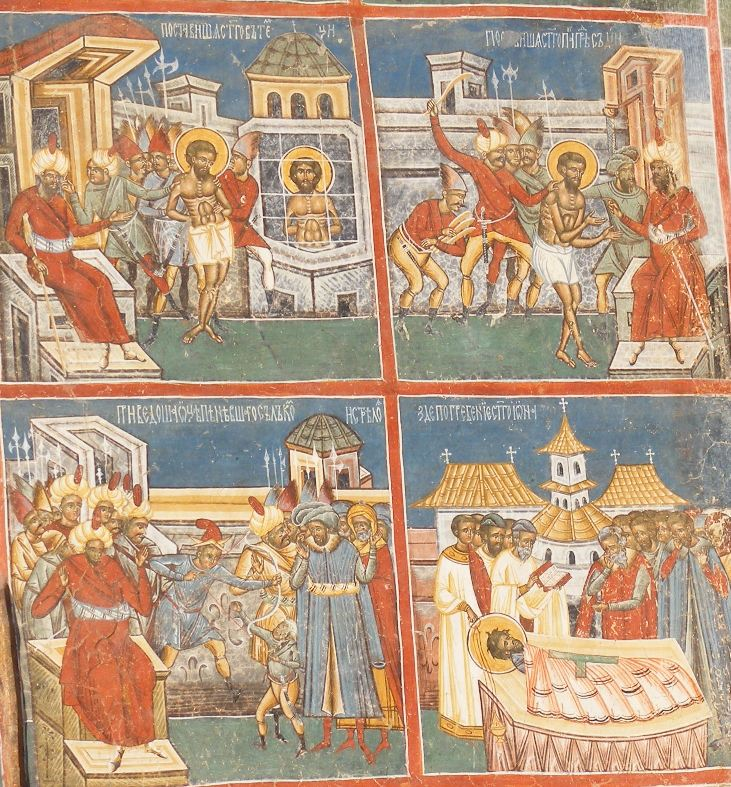
Scenes from the martyrdom of St. John the New of Suceava.

== Sources ==
- June 24/July 7. Orthodox Calendar (PRAVOSLAVIE.RU).
- July 7 / June 24. HOLY TRINITY RUSSIAN ORTHODOX CHURCH (A parish of the Patriarchate of Moscow).
- June 24. OCA - The Lives of the Saints.
- The Autonomous Orthodox Metropolia of Western Europe and the Americas (ROCOR). St. Hilarion Calendar of Saints for the year of our Lord 2004. St. Hilarion Press (Austin, TX). pp. 46–47.
- The Twenty-Fourth Day of the Month of June. Orthodoxy in China.
- June 24. Latin Saints of the Orthodox Patriarchate of Rome.
- The Roman Martyrology. Transl. by the Archbishop of Baltimore. Last Edition, According to the Copy Printed at Rome in 1914. Revised Edition, with the Imprimatur of His Eminence Cardinal Gibbons. Baltimore: John Murphy Company, 1916. pp. 183–184.
- Rev. Richard Stanton. A Menology of England and Wales, or, Brief Memorials of the Ancient British and English Saints Arranged According to the Calendar, Together with the Martyrs of the 16th and 17th Centuries. London: Burns & Oates, 1892. pp. 287–288.

Greek Sources

- Great Synaxaristes: (in Greek) 24 ΙΟΥΝΙΟΥ. ΜΕΓΑΣ ΣΥΝΑΞΑΡΙΣΤΗΣ.
- (in Greek) Συναξαριστής. 24 Ιουνίου. ECCLESIA.GR. (H ΕΚΚΛΗΣΙΑ ΤΗΣ ΕΛΛΑΔΟΣ).
- (in Greek) 24 Ιουνίου. Αποστολική Διακονία της Εκκλησίας της Ελλάδος (Apostoliki Diakonia of the Church of Greece).
- (in Greek) 24/06/2018. Ορθόδοξος Συναξαριστής.

Russian Sources

- (in Russian) 7 июля (24 июня). Православная Энциклопедия под редакцией Патриарха Московского и всея Руси Кирилла (электронная версия). (Orthodox Encyclopedia - Pravenc.ru).
- (in Russian) 24 июня по старому стилю / 7 июля по новому стилю. Русская Православная Церковь - Православный церковный календарь на 2017 год.
- (in Russian) 24 июня (ст.ст.) 7 июля 2014 (нов. ст.). Русская Православная Церковь Отдел внешних церковных связей. (DECR).
