= Orentius =

Orentius may refer to:

- Orentius and Patientia (d. 240), Christian martyr and saint, father of St. Lawrence
- Orentius (martyr) (d. 304), Roman soldier, Christian martyr and saint
- Orientius (d. 439), Latin poet, Bishop of Auch and saint
