= January 7 (Eastern Orthodox liturgics) =

Day in the Eastern Orthodox liturgical calendar

Eastern Orthodox liturgical calendar
January 6	January 7	January 8
January 7 O.S. ≍ January 20 N.S. January 7 N.S ≍ December 25 O.S.

An Eastern Orthodox cross

January 7 in Eastern Orthodox liturgical calendars is a feast day and a day of commemoration of saints and martyrs. Although some Orthodox churches use the Revised Julian Calendar and others use the traditional Julian calendar, the fixed commemorations for their respective January 7 are broadly the same, no matter which calendar is used. (Note: Despite the dates being the same, the days to which they refer typically differ by 13 days. The notation Old Style or O.S. is sometimes used to indicate a date in the traditional Julian Calendar (the "Old Calendar"). The notation New Style or N.S, indicates a date in the Revised Julian calendar (the "New Calendar").)

== Feasts ==
- Afterfeast of the Theophany of Our Lord and Savior Jesus Christ.

== Saints ==
- Synaxis of the Holy Prophet, Forerunner and Baptist Saint John, and the translation of his holy right hand (956) from Antioch to Constantinople. (Note: On this day we also celebrate the translation to Constantinople of the holy right hand of St John the Forerunner (956 AD). The holy Evangelist Luke, who went preaching Christ in various cities and towns, came to Sebaste, where they gave him the right hand of the holy Prophet John, the very hand with which he had baptized the Savior. The Evangelist Luke took it with him to his native city of Antioch. There, many miracles subsequently took place. It is said that during the feast of the Exaltation of the Holy Cross, the Bishop also elevated the holy relic; sometimes the relic became extended and sometimes it became contracted; when it was extended it signified a fertile harvest, however when it contracted it signified deprivation and poverty. When the Moslems seized Antioch centuries later, a Deacon named Job brought the holy hand of the Forerunner from Antioch to Chalcedon. From there, on the eve of the Theophany of the Lord, it was transferred to Constantinople (956 AD) and kept thereafter.)
- Saint Julian the Deacon, of Aegina (391) (Note: The Bishop of Athens ordained Julian as Deacon. Adorned with the grace of the holy order, he went forth along with the Priest Julius to preach the Gospel and baptized many. At the end of his life he departed for Gozzano near Lake Maggiore, where he practiced asceticism and prayer, and reposed peacefully in the year 391 AD.)

== Pre-Schism Western saints ==
- Saint Crispin, Bishop of Pavia in Italy, he signed the acts of the Council of Milan (467)
- Saint Valentine, an abbot who became a bishop in Rhaetia (470) (Note: He reposed in Mais in the Tyrol in Austria. Some years later his relics were translated to Trent and then to Passau.)
- Saint Brannock of Braunton (Brannocus, Brynach), England (6th century) (Note: Born in Wales, he crossed to Devon in England and founded a monastery in Braunton.) (see also: June 26)
- Saint Cedd, Bishop of Lastingham (664) (see also: October 26)
- Saint Cronan Beg, a Bishop of Aendrum in County Down in Ireland (7th century)
- Saint Tillo of Solignac (Thillo, Thielman, Théau, Tilloine, Tillmann) (702) (Note: Born in Saxony in Germany, he was abducted by robbers and enslaved. Freed by St Eligius of Noyon, he became a monk at Solignac and enlightened the area around Tournai and Courtrai in Belgium.)
- Saint Kentigerna, Hermitess of Loch Lomond (734) (Note: Daughter of Kelly, prince of Leinster and mother of St Coellan. After her husband's death she left Ireland and became an Anchoress on the island of Inchebroida on Loch Lomond in Scotland, where a church is dedicated to her.)
- Saint Emilian (Émilion, Aemilio), born in Vannes, he was a monk at Saujon near Saintes, and died as a hermit in the forest of Combes near Bordeaux (767)
- Blessed Widukind (Wittekind, Wittikind, Wittikund) of Westphalia (807) (Note: A noble from Westphalia in Germany, he was converted by a vision and baptised in 785. He was zealous in spreading Christianity and restoring churches.)
- Saint Aldric of Le Mans (Aldericus, Audry), Bishop of Le Mans in France, from 832 (856)
- Saint Reinold (Rainald, Reynold), monk at the monastery of St Pantaleon in Cologne in Germany (960) (Note: He was killed by stonemasons who threw his body into a pool near the Rhine. It was later found by divine revelation.)
- Saint Anastasius, Archbishop of Sens (977) (Note: He began building the Cathedral and greatly helped the monks of Saint-Pierre-le-Vif, in whose church he was buried.)

== Post-Schism Orthodox saints ==
- Saint Feodor I of Russia (Fyodor (Theodore) I Ivanovich), last Rurikid Tsar of Russia (1598) (Note: In Russian documents he is sometimes called blessed (Russian: Блаженный).)

=== New martyrs and confessors ===
- New Martyr Athanasius of Attalia and Smyrna (1700)
- New Hieromartyr Nicholas Parfenov, Bishop of Atkarsk (1939) (Note: The Atkarsk Vicariate of the Saratov Diocese, of the Russian Orthodox Church existed from 1923-1925.)
- New Hieromartyr Risto (Stevanov) Jaramaz, Priest of Kosijerevo, Montenegro (1942) (Note: Father Risto was martyred on St. John's Day, January 20, 1942. The Serbian name "Risto" (Ристо) is the South Slavic equivalent of the Greek name "Christos" (Χρήστος). They share the exact same root and meaning. In neighbouring Bulgaria and North Macedonia, it is often spelled "Hristo" (Христо).) (see also: May 13 - O.S., feast day)

== Other commemorations ==
- Saint Pakhomios of Keno Lake (1515) (Note: See: (in Russian) Пахомий Кенский. Википедии. (Russian Wikipedia).) (On the first Saturday after the Baptism of the Lord. See also: January 31 and May 15)
- Miracle of Saint John the Baptist in Chios (1740)

== Icon gallery ==
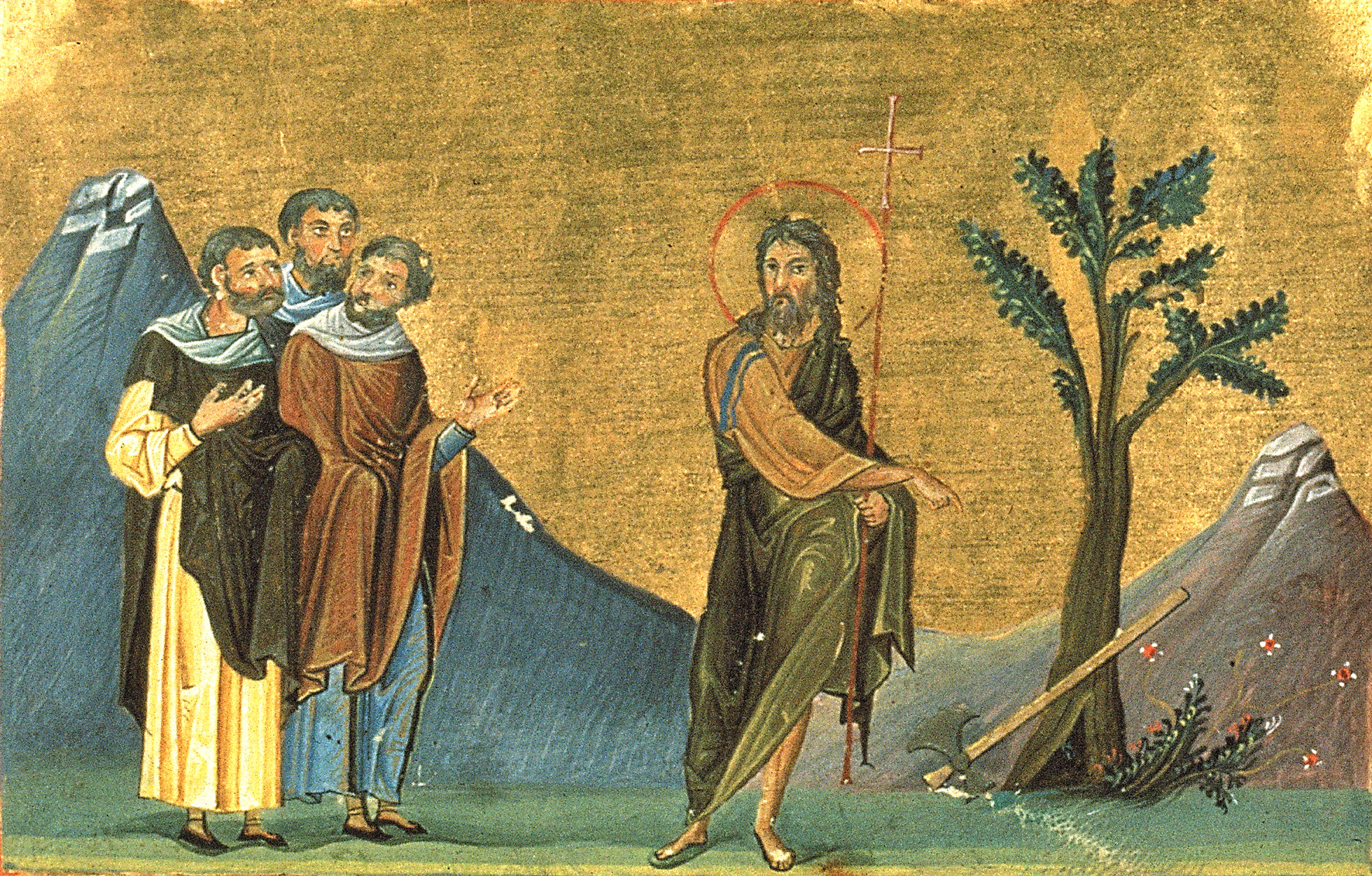
Synaxis of Saint John, the Holy Glorious Prophet, Baptist, and Forerunner.
(Menologion of Basil II, 10th century).

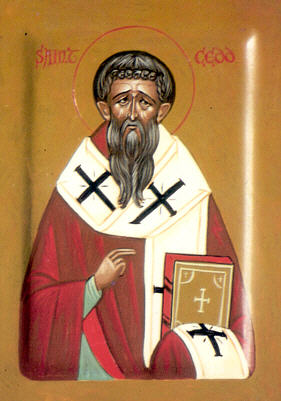
Saint Cedd, Bishop of Lastingham.

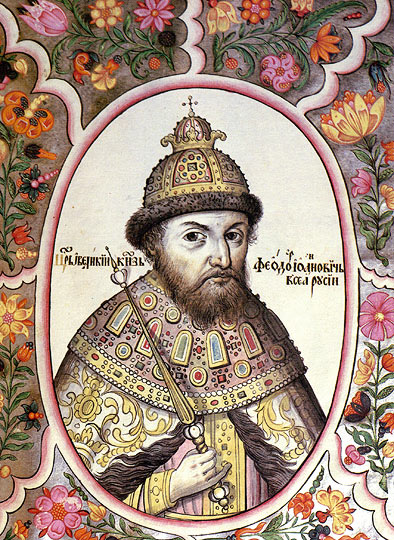
Blessed Feodor I of Russia.

== Sources ==
- January 7/January 20. Orthodox Calendar (PRAVOSLAVIE.RU).
- January 20 / January 7. HOLY TRINITY RUSSIAN ORTHODOX CHURCH (A parish of the Patriarchate of Moscow).
- January 7. OCA - The Lives of the Saints.
- The Autonomous Orthodox Metropolia of Western Europe and the Americas (ROCOR). St. Hilarion Calendar of Saints for the year of our Lord 2004. St. Hilarion Press (Austin, TX). p. 6.
- January 7. Latin Saints of the Orthodox Patriarchate of Rome.
- The Roman Martyrology. Transl. by the Archbishop of Baltimore. Last Edition, According to the Copy Printed at Rome in 1914. Revised Edition, with the Imprimatur of His Eminence Cardinal Gibbons. Baltimore: John Murphy Company, 1916. pp. 7–8.

Greek Sources

- Great Synaxaristes: (in Greek) 7 ΙΑΝΟΥΑΡΙΟΥ. ΜΕΓΑΣ ΣΥΝΑΞΑΡΙΣΤΗΣ.
- (in Greek) Συναξαριστής. 7 Ιανουαρίου. ECCLESIA.GR. (H ΕΚΚΛΗΣΙΑ ΤΗΣ ΕΛΛΑΔΟΣ).

Russian Sources

- (in Russian) 20 января (7 января). Православная Энциклопедия под редакцией Патриарха Московского и всея Руси Кирилла (электронная версия). (Orthodox Encyclopedia - Pravenc.ru).
- (in Russian) 7 января (ст.ст.) 20 января 2014 (нов. ст.). Русская Православная Церковь Отдел внешних церковных связей. (DECR).
