= June 27 (Eastern Orthodox liturgics) =

Day in the Eastern Orthodox liturgical calendar

Eastern Orthodox liturgical calendar
June 26	June 27	June 28
June 27 O.S. ≍ July 10 N.S. June 27 N.S ≍ June 14 O.S.

An Eastern Orthodox cross

June 27 in Eastern Orthodox liturgical calendars is a feast day and a day of commemoration of saints and martyrs. Although some Orthodox churches use the Revised Julian Calendar and others use the traditional Julian calendar, the fixed commemorations for their respective June 27 are broadly the same, no matter which calendar is used. (Note: Despite the dates being the same, the days to which they refer typically differ by 13 days. The notation Old Style or O.S. is sometimes used to indicate a date in the traditional Julian Calendar (the "Old Calendar"). The notation New Style or N.S. indicates a date in the Revised Julian calendar (the "New Calendar").)

== Saints ==
- Saint Joanna the Myrrhbearer (1st century)
- Martyr Anectus of Caesarea Palaestina (298 or 304) (Note: "At Caesarea, in Palestine, in the persecution of Diocletian, under the governor Urbanus, St. Anectus, martyr. For having exhorted others to suffer martyrdom, and overthrown idols by his prayers, he was scourged by ten soldiers, had his hands and feet cut off, and by decapitation merited the crown of martyrdom.") (Note: "Anectus, martyr at Caesarea, in Cappadocia, in the persecution of Diocletian, was arrested by order of Urban, governor of the province, because he exhorted other Christians to martyrdom, and because he had overthrown several idols in the excess of his zeal. He was condemned to be beaten by ten soldiers, and then to have his hands and feet and head cut off. The date of his martyrdom cannot be fixed exactly.")
- Martyrs Therapon, Macarius, Marcius and Marcia.
- Hieromartyrs Crescens, Maximus, and Theonest, Bishops of Mainz, Germany (early 5th century)
- Venerable Sampson the Hospitable of Constantinople (530) (Note: "At Constantinople, St. Sampson, a priest who harbored the poor.") (Note: "S. Sampson was born of honourable parents, related to the emperor, at Rome. He however lived in Constantinople, where he devoted himself to the care of the sick, for whose accommodation he opened a hospital. Justinian, the emperor, being afflicted with a distressing disorder, which the physicians were unable tc cure, applied to Sampson, who by his touch entirely removed the disease. The emperor in his gratitude would have lavished on him great gifts, but Sampson would accept nothing except a large and commodious building for conversion into a hospital.")
- Saint Severus of Interocrea in Italy (Severus d’Antrodoco), presbyter (6th century)
- Hieromartyr Pierius of Antioch, presbyter, by fire.
- Venerable Luke the Hermit.

== Pre-Schism Western saints ==
- Saint Clement, a martyr in Córdoba in Spain under Diocletian (He belongs to the group led by St Zoilus) (c. 298)
- Saint Zoilus and Companions, a youth martyred in Córdoba in Spain under Diocletian (c. 301) (Note: "At Córdoba, St. Zoilus, and nineteen other martyrs." The monastery of San Zoil de Carrión in León in Spain was founded to enshrine his relics.) (Note: "Zoilus, martyr of Cordova, in Spain, was arrested in the persecution of Diocletian. Alter having endured various tortures, he was decapitated with twenty-nine others. A church was built at Cordova in his honour, and his relics are there preserved. Seven of the company suspiciously enough bear the names of the seven sons of S. Symphorosa, and in the same order.")
- Saint Deodatus of Nola, Deacon of St Paulinus of Nola in Italy and later his successor (473)
- Saint John of Chinon, born in Brittany, he became a hermit in Chinon in the west of France, where he became the spiritual father of Queen Radegund (6th century) (Note: See: (in French) Jean de Chinon. Wikipédia. (French Wikipedia).)

== Post-Schism Orthodox saints ==
- Saint George of the Holy Mountain and Georgia (1065)
- Blessed Martin of Turov (after 1146) (Note: See: (in Russian) Мартин Туровский. Википедии. (Russian Wikipedia).)
- Martyrdom of Monk Luke (Mukhaidze) of Holy Cross Monastery in Jerusalem (1277)
- New Martyr Iakovos, of Emesa in Syria and of Tripoli in Lebanon, ascetic (15th or 16th century)
- Venerable Serapion of Kozhaezersk Monastery (1611) (see also: October 19 )
- Hieromartyr Cyril Loukaris, Ecumenical Patriarch of Constantinople (1638) (Note: Hieromartyr Cyril Loukaris (†1638) was honoured as a Saint and Martyr shortly after his martyric death, and the Venerable Saint Eugenios of Aitolia (†1682, August 5) compiled an Akolouthia (Service) to celebrate his memory. The official glorification of Hieromartyr Cyril Loukaris took place by decision of the Holy Synod of the Patriarchate of Alexandria on October 6, 2009.) (Note: While Cyril was several times deposed temporarily and banished at the instigation of his orthodox opponents and of the Jesuits, who were his bitterest enemies, his death came suddenly. According to Professor Christos Patrinellis: "The Catholic Church used all its religious and political influence to destroy this "son of darkness": the Jesuits and Capuchins of Constantinople, the French and Austrian ambassadors, the newly constituted Propaganda Fidei, Pope Urban VIII himself and even Louis XIII and the powerful Cardinal Richelieu. Almost any means of attacking Loukaris were regarded as legitimate because the motive was "sacred": these included threats and violence, bribing Turkish officials and pro-Catholic clerics in the circle of his successor Cyril Kontares, forging texts incriminating Loukaris, and claiming that the patriarch was inciting foreign powers against the Ottoman Empire. The Austrian Embassy planned Loukaris' assas[s]ination or his abduction to Italy and delivered to the Holy Inquisition. Eventually the Austrian ambassador and Kontares persuaded the Sublime Porte to eliminate the patriarch and he was strangled on June 27, 1638.") (Note: (in Greek) "Στις 27 Ιουνίου του 1638 Λατίνοι και εβραίοι εξαγόρασαν με 4.000 τάλληρα τον Μέγα Βεζύρη Βαϊράμ Πασά και με διαταγή του συνελήφθη και εξετελέσθη ο Κύριλλος Λούκαρις με την κατηγορία ότι προπαρασκεύαζε εθνική επανάσταση των Ελλήνων με την βοήθεια των Ορθοδόξων Κοζάκων.")

=== New martyrs and confessors ===
- New Hieromartyr Gregory Nikolsky, priest, of Kuban (1918)
- New Hieromartyr Alexander Sidorov, priest (1918)
- New Hieromartyr Vladimir Sergeev, priest (1918)
- New Hieromartyr Kirion II, Catholicos-Patriarch of All Georgia (1918)
- New Hieromartyr Peter Ostroumov, priest (1939)

== Other commemorations ==
- The narrative of Synesius of Cyrene, Philosopher and Bishop of Cyrene, about Evagrius the Philosopher and the 300 pieces of gold (c. 411) (Note: Nicodemus the Hagiorite relays this narrative, concerning a certain philosopher named Evagrius, who was an idolater. Through Synesius' efforts, Evagrius and his children were baptized. In order to give thanks, Evagrius gave Synesius 300 gold pieces to distribute to the poor.)
- Uncovering of the relics of Optina Elders (1998):

- Leonid, Macarius, (Note: See: (in Russian) Макарий Оптинский. Википедии. (Russian Wikipedia).) Hilarion, (Note: See: (in Russian) Иларион Оптинский. Википедии. (Russian Wikipedia).) Ambrose, Anatole I, (Note: See: (in Russian) Анатолий (Зерцалов). Википедии. (Russian Wikipedia).) Barsanuphius, (Note: See: (in Russian) Варсонофий Оптинский. Википедии. (Russian Wikipedia).) and Anatole II. (Note: See: (in Russian) Анатолий (Потапов). Википедии. (Russian Wikipedia).)

== Icon gallery ==
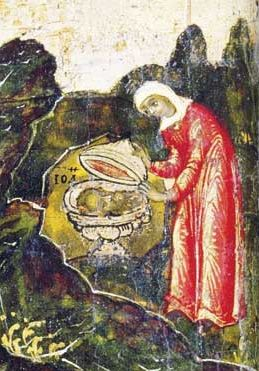
St Joanna the Myrrhbearer, and the Head of St. John the Baptist.

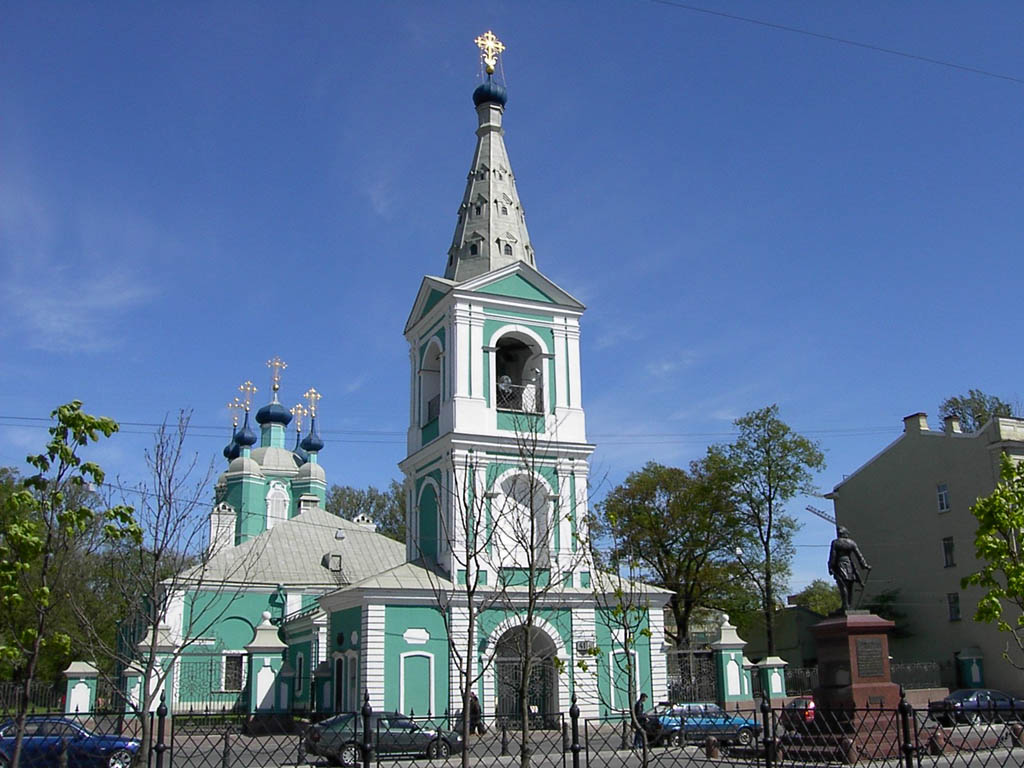
Cathedral of St. Sampson the Hospitable, in St. Petersburg.

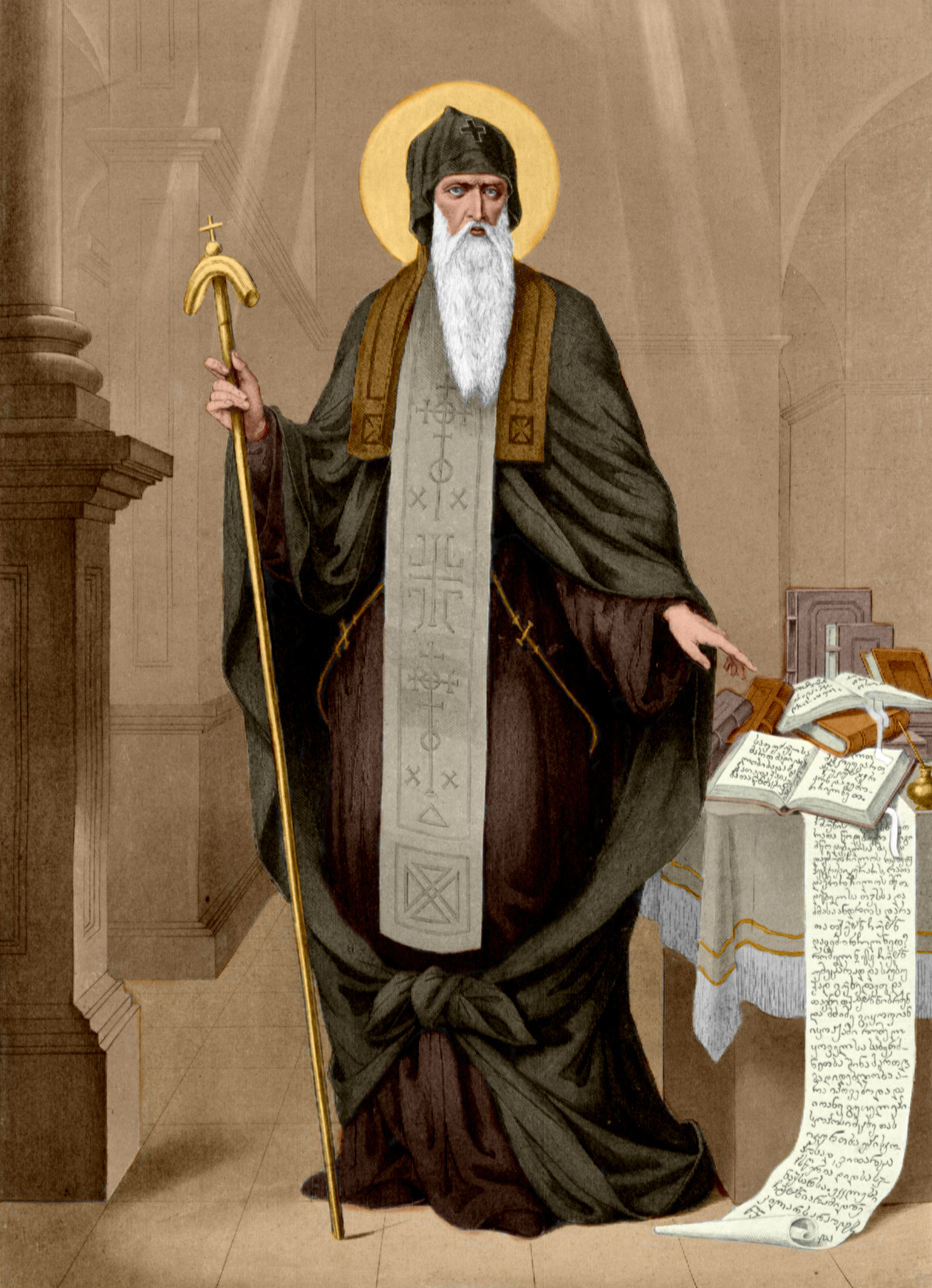
Venerable George of the Holy Mountain.

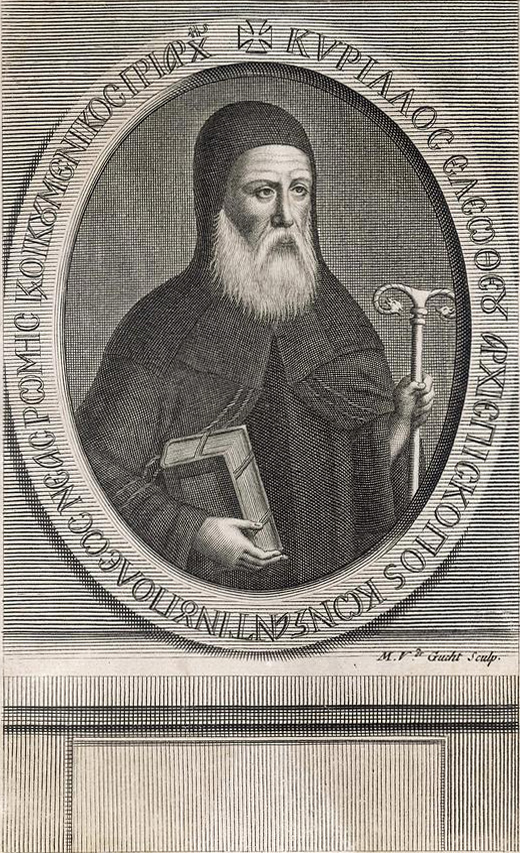
Hieromartyr Cyril Loukaris, Ecumenical Patriarch of Constantinople.

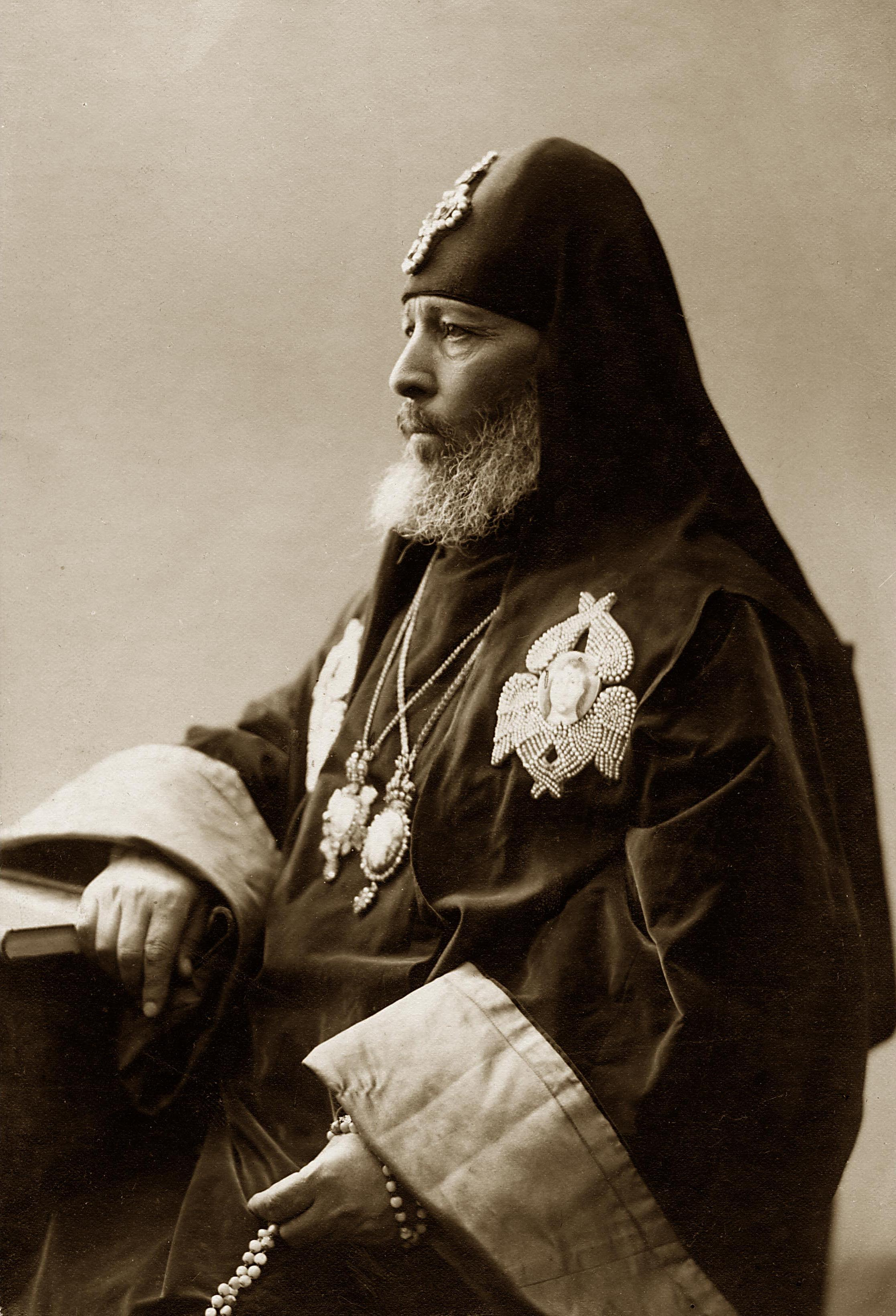
St. Kirion II, Catholicos-Patriarch of All Georgia.

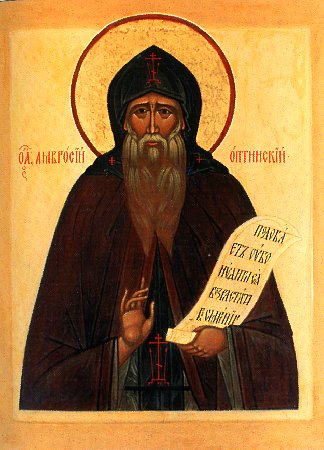
Venerable Ambrose of Optina.

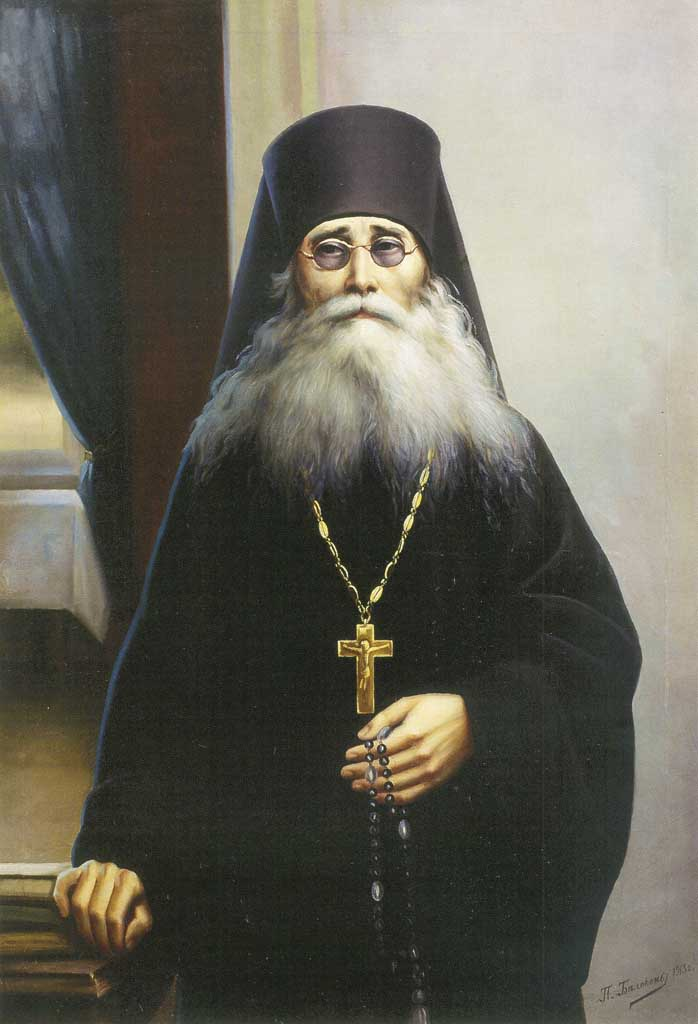
Venerable Barsanuphius of Optina.

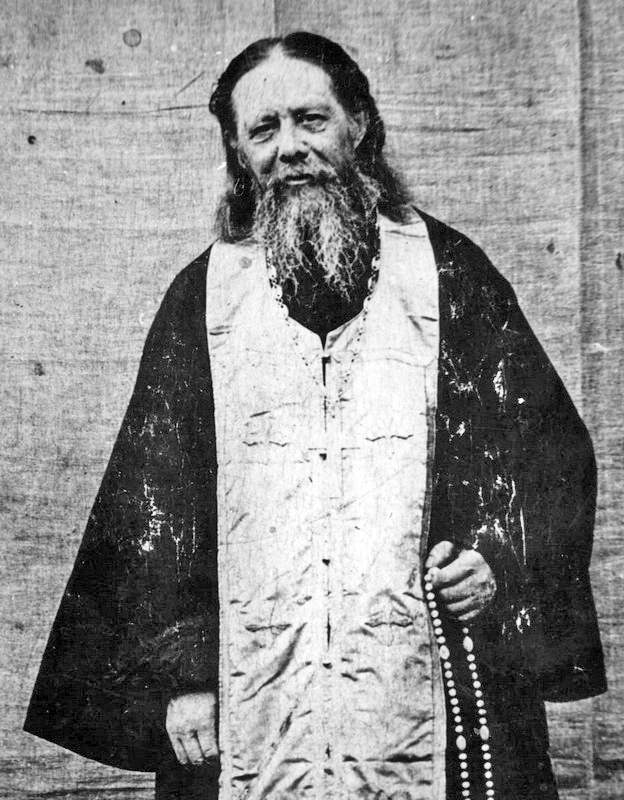
Venerable Anatole II of Optina.

== Sources ==
- June 27/July 10. Orthodox Calendar (PRAVOSLAVIE.RU).
- July 10 / June 27. HOLY TRINITY RUSSIAN ORTHODOX CHURCH (A parish of the Patriarchate of Moscow).
- June 27. OCA - The Lives of the Saints.
- The Autonomous Orthodox Metropolia of Western Europe and the Americas (ROCOR). St. Hilarion Calendar of Saints for the year of our Lord 2004. St. Hilarion Press (Austin, TX). p. 47.
- The Twenty-Seventh Day of the Month of June. Orthodoxy in China.
- June 27. Latin Saints of the Orthodox Patriarchate of Rome.
- The Roman Martyrology. Transl. by the Archbishop of Baltimore. Last Edition, According to the Copy Printed at Rome in 1914. Revised Edition, with the Imprimatur of His Eminence Cardinal Gibbons. Baltimore: John Murphy Company, 1916. p. 187.
- Rev. Richard Stanton. A Menology of England and Wales, or, Brief Memorials of the Ancient British and English Saints Arranged According to the Calendar, Together with the Martyrs of the 16th and 17th Centuries. London: Burns & Oates, 1892. pp. 291–292.

Greek Sources

- Great Synaxaristes: (in Greek) 27 ΙΟΥΝΙΟΥ. ΜΕΓΑΣ ΣΥΝΑΞΑΡΙΣΤΗΣ.
- (in Greek) Συναξαριστής. 27 Ιουνίου. ECCLESIA.GR. (H ΕΚΚΛΗΣΙΑ ΤΗΣ ΕΛΛΑΔΟΣ).
- (in Greek) 27 Ιουνίου. Αποστολική Διακονία της Εκκλησίας της Ελλάδος (Apostoliki Diakonia of the Church of Greece).
- (in Greek) 27/06/2018. Ορθόδοξος Συναξαριστής.

Russian Sources

- (in Russian) 10 июля (27 июня). Православная Энциклопедия под редакцией Патриарха Московского и всея Руси Кирилла (электронная версия). (Orthodox Encyclopedia - Pravenc.ru).
- (in Russian) 27 июня по старому стилю / 10 июля по новому стилю. Русская Православная Церковь - Православный церковный календарь на 2017 год.
- (in Russian) 27 июня (ст.ст.) 10 июля 2014 (нов. ст.). Русская Православная Церковь Отдел внешних церковных связей. (DECR).
