= Saint Gallicanus =

Roman martyr in Egypt

Saint Gallicanus was a Roman martyr in Egypt in 363 AD, during the reign of Julian. A former general, he converted to Christianity and retired to Ostia where he was involved in a variety of charitable works. The Emperor exiled him to Egypt, where he was later martyred.

== Life ==
Gallicanus was from a prominent Roman family with important political connections. According to his "Acta" (in Acta SS., June, VII, 31), he was a distinguished general in the war against the Persians. He was honored with a triumph and was held in affection by the emperor Constantine. He was also consul with Symmachus in 330 and perhaps also once before with Caesonius Bassus in 317.

According to a medieval legend, Gallienus was at one time the fiancé of Constantine's eldest daughter, Constantia and was converted to Christianity by her soldier bodyguards John and Paul. He then retired to Ostia, endowed a church built by Constantine I, and founded a hospital where he worked with Saint Hilarinus. There he washed the feet of the poor, prepared their table and served them, carefully waited on the infirm, and performed other works of mercy.

Under Julian he was banished to Egypt, and lived with the hermits in the desert. He was put to the sword at Alexandria for refusing to sacrifice to idols.

== Veneration ==
A small church was built in his honour in the Trastevere of Rome. His relics are at Rome in the church of Sant'Andrea della Valle. The legend of his conversion was dramatized in the tenth century by the nun Roswitha.

Gallicanus is commemorated on 25 June. He is depicted as hanging his armor on a cross.

A different Gallicanus was the seventh bishop of the Roman Catholic Archdiocese of Embrun from 541 to 549.
