= Saint Maxentius =

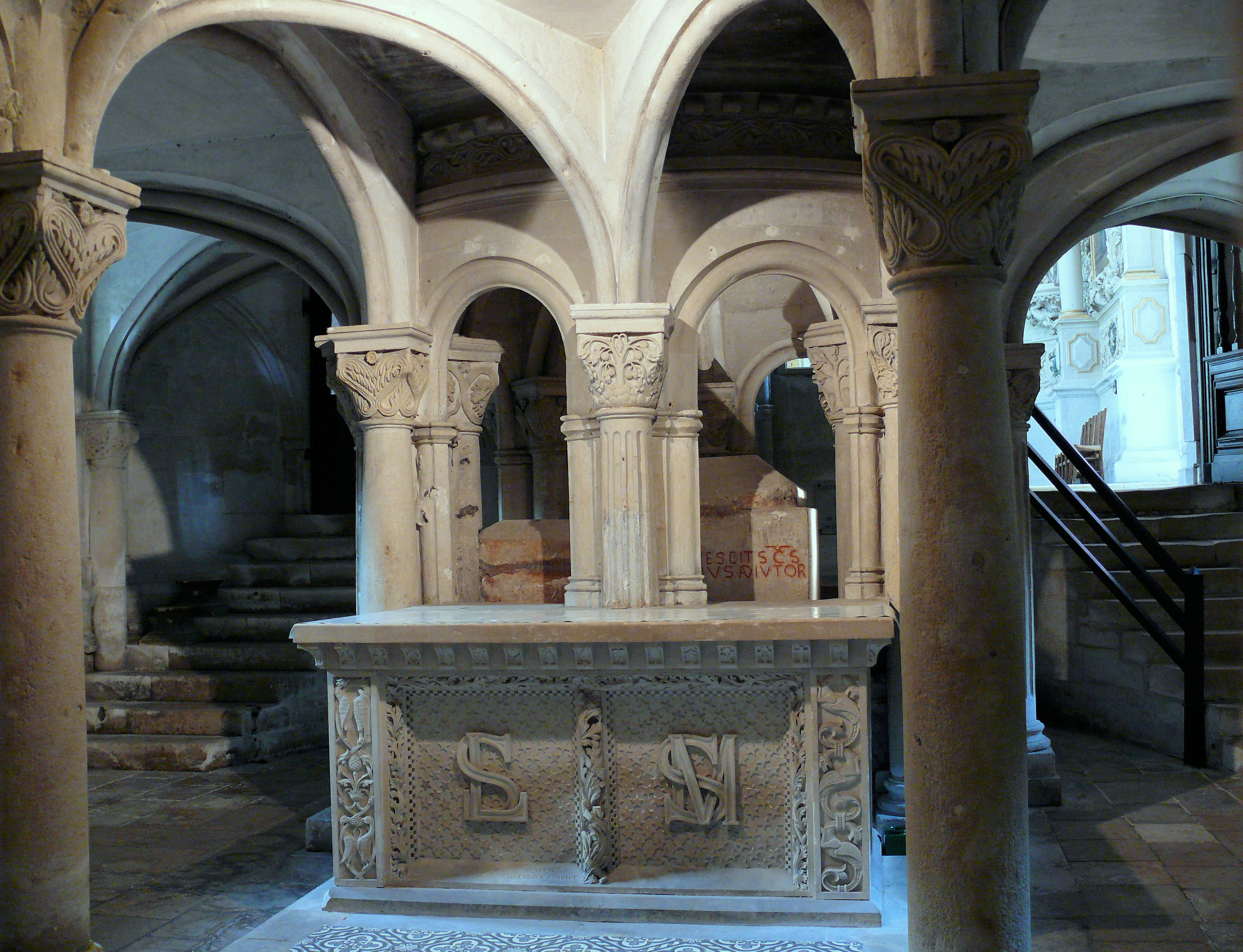
- The crypts of Saints Maxentius and Léger. Abbey of Saint-Maixent-l'École.

Abbot
- Born: ~445 AD; Agde, France
- Died: ~515 AD
- Venerated in: Roman Catholic Church
- Feast: June 26

Saint Maxentius (c. 445 – c. 515; French: Saint Maxence, Maixent) was born in Agde, France, and originally had the name Adjutor.

== Life ==
Adjutor attended the local monastery school where he was greatly influenced the Abbot Severus, and became a monk in the abbey.

According to Alban Butler:

Praise was even more distasteful to him than detraction, and to escape the prominence into which he was being thrust, he quietly slipped away from Agde and remained in hiding for two years. But when at the end of that time he came back to his home he found himself in a position of far greater publicity....Obviously, he must sever all ties with the past if he was to lead a life of obscurity. A second time he disappeared and this time he abandoned his native Narbonnaise for good.

He joined a monastery near Poitiers and took the name Maxentius. In about 500 he was elected abbot, succeeding Abbot Agapitus. In old age he retired from the office of abbot and became a hermit. The abbey was later named for him.

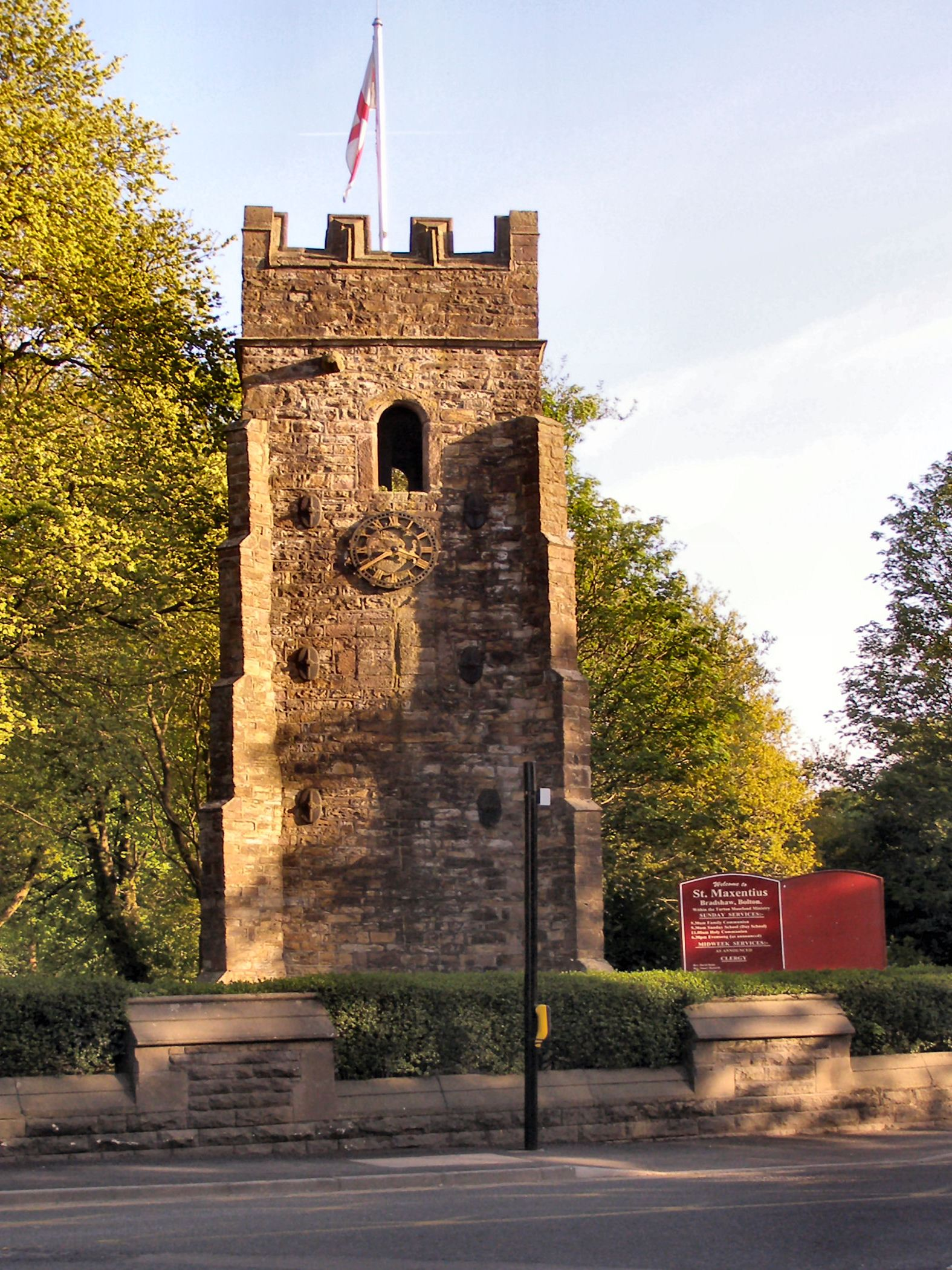
Bradshaw Chapel Tower

Maxentius is credited with several miracles. His return to Agde after his initial absence coincided with a break in the weather, relieving the drought-stricken countryside. During his tenure as abbot he confronted a band of soldiers who were threatening the monastery. One of the soldiers raised his arm to strike Maxentius but found himself unable to do so. The arm remained frozen until Maxentius applied holy oil.

Maxentius died in June 515, and was buried at the abbey church of Saint-Maixent-l'École.

== Veneration ==
St Maxentius' Church, Bradshaw is dedicated to him. Nearby is a tower, all that remains of an earlier church. The tower is a listed building.

His feast day is June 26.
