= Hilarinus =

4th-century Christian martyr

Saint Hilarinus
- Died: 361 AD; Arezzo, Tuscany
- Venerated in: Ostia
- Feast: 16 July

Hilarinus (or Hilary; died 361 AD) was a martyr who died with Donatus of Arezzo during the persecutions of the Roman Emperor Julian (r. 361–363). His feast day is 16 July.

== Monks of Ramsgate account ==
The Monks of Ramsgate wrote in their Book of Saints (1921),

DONATUS and HILARY (SS.) MM. (Aug. 7)
(4th century) Saint Donatus, Bishop of Arezzo in Tuscany, is commemorated liturgically on August 7. He, with Hilary (or Hilarinus), a monk, was put to death for the Faith under Julian the Apostate (A.D. 361). Hilary was scourged to death; Donatus was beheaded. Saint Gregory and others relate the many miracles wrought by these holy men, among which the restoring as before a glass altar-chalice dashed in pieces by the Pagans.

== Roman Martyrology ==
The Roman Martyrology mentions Hilarinus in the lives of Saints Donatus and Gallicanus,

At Arezzo, in Tuscany, the birthday of St. Donatus, bishop and martyr, who among other miraculous deeds, made whole again by his prayers (as is related by the blessed pope Gregory), a sacred chalice which had been broken by Pagans. Being apprehended by the imperial officer Quadratian, in the persecution of Julian the Apostate, and refusing to sacrifice to idols, he was struck with the sword, and thus consummated his martyrdom. With him suffered also the blessed monk Hilarinus, whose feast is celebrated on the 16th of July, when his body was taken to Ostia.

At Alexandria, St. Gallicanus, ex-consul and martyr, who had been honored with a triumph, and was held in affection by the emperor Constantine. Converted by Saints John and Paul, he withdrew to Ostia with St. Hilarinus, and devoted himself entirely to the duties of hospitality and to the service of the sick. The report of such an event spread through the whole world, and from all sides many persons came to see a man who had been a senator and consul, washing the feet of the poor, preparing their table, serving them, carefully waiting on the infirm, and performing other works of mercy. Driven from this place by Julian the Apostate, he repaired to Alexandria, where, for refusing to sacrifice to idols, at the command of the judge Raucian, he was put to the sword, and thus became a martyr of Christ.

== Butler's account ==
The hagiographer Alban Butler (1710–1773) wrote in his Lives of the Fathers, Martyrs, and Other Principal Saints under August 7,

St Donatus, Bishop of Arezzo in Tuscany, M. Being illustrious for sanctity and miracles, as St Gregory the Great assures us, he was apprehended by Quadratianus, the Augustalis, or imperial prefect of Tuscany, in the reign of Julian the Apostate. Refusing to adore the idols, he suffered many torments with invincible constancy, and at length finished his martyrdom by the sword in 361. His relics are enshrined in the cathedral of Arezzo. At the same time and place Saint Hilarinus, a monk, received the like crown, being beaten to death with clubs. His relics were afterwards translated to Ostia. See the Martyrologies.

== Sources ==
- Butler, Alban (1799), The Lives of the Primitive Fathers, Martyrs, and Other Principal Saints, J. Moir This article incorporates text from this source, which is in the public domain.
- Gibbons, J. Cardinal (1916), The Roman martyrology, Baltimore: John Murphy
- St. Augustine's Abbey, Ramsgate (1921). The Book of saints : a dictionary of servants of God canonized by the Catholic Church. London: A. & C. Black, ltd. OCLC 671676136. This article incorporates text from this source, which is in the public domain.
