= Seven Brothers of Lazia =

Martyrs
- Died: 304 AD (traditional date)
- Venerated in: Eastern Orthodox Church; Catholic Church
- Feast: 24 June

The Seven Brothers of Lazia (also known as the Seven Brothers of Lazica or Orentius and his companions) are a group of Christian martyrs venerated in Eastern Christianity. According to Byzantine and Georgian hagiographical traditions, the group consisted of the soldiers Orentius, Pharnacius, Heros (Eros), Firmus, Firminus, Cyriacus, and Longinus. They were traditionally believed to have suffered martyrdom in 304 AD during the reigns of the Roman emperors Diocletian and Maximian, during the period known as the Diocletianic Persecution.

The hagiographical tradition presents Orentius and his companions as Roman soldiers associated with the eastern Roman frontier. Their story is preserved mainly through later Byzantine and Georgian hagiographical texts rather than contemporary Roman records.

== Hagiographical tradition ==
According to the Passio of the Seven Brothers, Orentius was a soldier who defeated a warrior named Marothom, identified in the text as a Scythian. After the victory, the Passio states that Orentius refused to participate in sacrifices to the traditional Roman gods, declaring that the victory had been granted by Christ. He and his companions were subsequently condemned and sent into exile, dying at different locations along the eastern coast of the Black Sea.

The narrative contains themes common to late antique Christian martyr literature, especially the conflict between Christian belief and Roman religious obligations. The specific details of the events cannot be independently confirmed from contemporary sources.

The designation "Seven Brothers" reflects the hagiographical tradition that presents the martyrs as brothers. Whether the seven men were historical siblings cannot be independently established.

== Historical and textual background ==
No contemporary Roman source records the martyrdom of Orentius and his companions. The surviving evidence consists primarily of later Byzantine liturgical and hagiographical texts.

The tradition is preserved in Byzantine synaxarial and menological collections, including the Synaxarion of Constantinople and later Byzantine menological compilations such as the Menologion of Basil II.

The Greek hagiographical tradition relating to Orentius and his companions is catalogued in the Bibliotheca Hagiographica Graeca.

The tradition also circulated in Georgian hagiographical literature. Paul Peeters argued that the legend developed within Christian communities of the eastern Black Sea region, historically associated with Lazica, and reflects interaction between Greek and Georgian traditions.

== Saints ==
The seven martyrs are commemorated together on 24 June in Byzantine tradition, while individual commemorations appear in Byzantine calendars.

Saint	Traditional commemoration date	Traditional place associated with martyrdom
Heros (Eros)	22 June	Parembole
Orentius	24 June	Rhiza (identified with modern Rize)
Pharnacius	3 July	Cordyle
Firmus	7 July	Apsarus (identified with modern Gonio)
Firminus	7 July	Apsarus
Cyriacus	24 July (or 14 July in some traditions)	Zigania
Longinus	28 July	Pityus (identified with modern Pitsunda)

The identification of these ancient place names with modern locations follows geographical scholarship on the eastern Black Sea coast.

== Veneration ==
The Seven Brothers are venerated primarily in Eastern Christian traditions. Their collective feast day is 24 June, while several members of the group have separate commemorations in Byzantine calendars.

Their cult became associated with the region of Lazica and the eastern Black Sea coast. Their inclusion in Byzantine liturgical collections reflects their place within the wider Byzantine tradition of Christian saints.

== See also ==
- Military saint
- Christian martyrs
- Lazica
- Christianity in the Roman Empire
