= Serafim (given name) =

Serafim is a masculine given name. Notable people with the name include:

- Serafim (footballer), João Vieira dos Santos (born 1940), Brazilian footballer
- Serafim Baptista (1925–2001), Portuguese footballer
- Serafim Batzoglou, Greek-American researcher
- Serafim Barzakov (born 1975), Bulgarian wrestler
- Serafim Cojocari (born 2001), Moldovan footballer
- Serafim Fernandes de Araújo (1924–2019), Brazilian Roman Catholic archbishop
- Serafim de Freitas c. 1570–1633), Portuguese jurist and canon lawyer
- Serafim Grammatikopoulos (born 1960), Greek weightlifter
- Serafim Guimarães (born 1934), Portuguese physician and pharmacologist
- Serafim Kalliadasis, Greek applied mathematician and chemical engineer
- Serafim Karalexis (21st century), British film producer
- Serafim Kolpakov (1933–2011), Soviet engineer and politician
- Serafim Maniotis (born 2000), Greek professional footballer
- Serafim Mihaylov (born 1995), Bulgarian footballer
- Serafim Moysidis (born 1990), Greek footballer
- Serafim Neves (1920–1989), Portuguese footballer
- Serafim Papakostas (1959–2020), Greek Orthodox bishop
- Serafim Pereira (1943–1994), Portuguese footballer
- Serafim Saca (1935–2011), Moldovan writer
- Serafim Šolaja (1800–1853), Serbian cleric
- Serafim Subbotin (1921–1996), Soviet military pilot
- Serafim Sudbinin (1867–1944), Russian sculptor, painter, ceramicist and stage actor
- Serafim Todorov (born 1969), Bulgarian-Georgian boxer
- Serafim Tulikov (1914–2004), Russian composer
- Serafim Urechean (born 1950), Moldovan politician
- Serafim Vieira (born 1966), Portuguese road cyclist

== See also ==
- Serafim (disambiguation)
- Serafin
