= Serafin (surname) =

Serafin is a surname. Notable people with this surname include:

- Aldo Vera Serafin (c. 1933–1976), Cuban exile
- Barry Serafin (born 1941), American television journalist
- Barry Serafin (golf course architect), American golf course architect
- Catharina Serafin, Prussian woman on whom the first studies of electrical pacing were performed
- Enzo Serafin (1912–1995), Italian cinematographer
- Felix Serafin (1905–1966), American golfer
- Harald Serafin (1931–2025), Austrian opera singer and artistic director
- Henryk Serafin (1920–1997), Polish football player and coach
- Jakub Serafin (born 1996), Polish footballer
- Jean Sérafin (born 1941), French football player and coach
- Paulo Serafín (born 1975), Mexican footballer
- Piotr Serafin (born 1974), Polish politician and lawyer
- Shan Serafin (born 1972), American film director, screenwriter, and novelist
- Silvio Sérafin (1938–2021), French footballer
- Stefania Serafin (born 1973), Italian professor
- Thom Serafin, American public affairs consultant
- Thomas J. Serafin, American author and Christian relics collector
- Tullio Serafin (1878–1968), Italian opera conductor

== See also ==
- Serafin (given name)
- Séraphin (disambiguation)
