= Serafim =

Serafim may refer to:

- Serafim, the Lighthouse Keeper's Son, a Croatian film
- Serafim (given name), a masculine given name
- Dimitrie Serafim (1862–1931), Romanian painter
- Leon Serafim (born 1945), American academic and japanologist
- Matheus Serafim (born 1998), Brazilian footballer
- Le Sserafim, a South Korean girl group

== See also ==
- Serafin (disambiguation)
- Seraphim (disambiguation)
