= Seraph (disambiguation) =

A seraph is a celestial being in Jewish and Christian mythology.

Seraph(s) or seraphim may also refer to:

== Arts and entertainment ==
=== Film ===
- Seraph (The Matrix), a character in The Matrix film trilogy

=== Games ===
- Seraph, character in the video game Shin Megami Tensei: Digital Devil Saga 2
- Seraph, a vehicle in the video game series Halo
- The Seraph, the key to the Tibetan palace containing the Talion in Tomb Raider II
- Seraphim, a faction in the video game expansion pack Supreme Commander: Forged Alliance
- Seraphim (cancelled video game)

=== Literature and comics ===
- Seraph (comics), a DC Comics superhero
- Seraphim, a character in the webcomic Megatokyo
- Seraphs, the second novel in the Rogue Mage series by Faith Hunter
- Seraph of the End, manga series written by Takaya Kagami
- Seraphim: 266613336 Wings, manga series by Mamoru Oshii and Satoshi Kon

=== Music ===
- Seraph, a member of the band Dark Fortress
- Seraphim (band) (六翼天使), a power metal band from Taiwan
- Seraphim Records, a record label
- Seraphim Trio, an Australian classical music trio
- "Seraphim", a 2020 song by Au5

== Organisms ==
- Seraphim moth, the geometer moth Lobophora halterata
- Seraphs (gastropod), an extinct genus of sea snails within the Seraphsidae family
- 'Seraph', a specially bred variety of Medicago littoralis, a pasture plant species

== People ==
=== Religious figures ===
- Serafim de Freitas (c. 1570 – 1633), Portuguese jurist and canon lawyer
- Saint Seraphim of Sarov (1754/1759–1833), Russian Orthodox starets (elder)
- Saint Seraphim Chichagov (1856–1937), Russian Orthodox Metropolitan and New Martyr
- Seraphim Papakostas (1892–1954), Superior of the Zoe Brotherhood movement in Greece from 1927–1954
- Seraphim Nikitin (1905–1979), Russian Orthodox Metropolitan of Krutitsy and Kolomna
- Seraphim Rose (1934–1982), aka Seraphim of Platina, American hieromonk of the Russian Orthodox Church Outside Russia
- Seraphim of Athens (1913–1998), Archbishop of Athens and All Greece 1974–1998
- Serapheim Savvaitis (1900–2003), Igumen (head) of the Greek Orthodox monastery: the Holy Lavra of Saint Sabbas, 1957–2003
- Seraphim Glushakov (1969–2020), Russian Orthodox Bishop of Anadyr and Chukotka
- Seraphim Storheim (fl. late-20th–early-21st centuries), defrocked hierarch for the Orthodox Church in America
- Abba Seraphim (1948–2025), British independent Oriental Orthodox bishop

=== Others ===
- Seraph Young Ford (1846–1938), first American woman to cast a ballot under equal voting rights law
- Seraph Frissell (1840–1915), American physician and medical writer
- Seraphim Post (1904–1975), American football player
- Serafim Tulikov (1914–2004), Soviet composer

== Transportation ==
- Back Bone Seraph, a French paramotor design
- HMS Seraph, name of two British ships including a World War II submarine
- Rolls-Royce Silver Seraph, a model of car

== Other uses ==
- Nashville Seraphs, a minor league baseball team based in Nashville, Tennessee, in 1895
- Royal Order of the Seraphim, a Swedish order of chivalry
- Seraph Secure, a software package by Kitboga (streamer)

== See also ==
- Autumn of the Seraphs, an album by the band Pinback
- "The Host of Seraphim", a song from the album The Serpent's Egg (album) by Dead Can Dance
- Le Sserafim, South-Korean girl group
- Saraph
- Serafina (disambiguation)
- Seraph of the End, anime television series
- Seraphim Falls, a 2007 western film starring Liam Neeson and Pierce Brosnan
- Seraphimon, a character in the anime television series Digimon
- Seraphin (disambiguation)
