= Séraphine =

Séraphine or Seraphine may refer to:

- Seraphine (musical instrument), 19c. keyboard instrument, an early version of the harmonium
- Séraphine Louis (Séraphine de Senlis, 1864–1942), French painter
  - Séraphine (film) (2008), Franco-Belgian film about her
- Séraphine, a play by Victorien Sardou
- Séraphine (company), an international maternity fashion label and store
- Seraphine, a fictional online personality, singer, member of the virtual K-pop group K/DA, and a champion in the video game League of Legends

== See also ==
- Seraphin (disambiguation)
- Serafin (disambiguation)
- Serafina (given name)
- Serafino (disambiguation)
- Serapion (disambiguation)
