= Serafino =

Serafino may refer to:

== People ==
=== Given name ===
- Serafino Belfanti (1860–1939), Italian immunologist
- Serafino Biagioni (1920–1983), Italian bicycle racer
- Serafino Brizzi (1684–1724), Italian engraver
- Serafino Cavalli (died 1578), Roman Catholic Master of the Order of Preachers
- Serafino Cerva (1696–1759), Dalmatian Italian author of Ragusan Library, the first encyclopedia in the Dalmatian language
- Serafino Cimino (1873–1928), Italian prelate of the Catholic Church who led the Franciscans
- Serafino Cretoni (1833–1909), Italian Roman Catholic cardinal
- Seraphin of Montegranaro (1540–1605) (Italian: Serafino da Montegranaro), Italian Capuchin friar and saint
- Serafino Amedeo De Ferrari (1824–1885), Italian composer, conductor, organist and pianist
- Serafino de' Serafini (1323–1393), Italian painter
- Serafino De Tivoli (1826–1892), Italian artist of the Macchiaioli group
- Serafino dell'Aquila (1466–1500), Italian poet and improvisatore
- Serafino Dubois (1817–1899), Italian chess player and writer
- Serafino Foge Fazio (1938–2009), American football player, college head coach and National Football League assistant coach
- Serafino Fortibraccia (died 1571), Roman Catholic Bishop of Nemosia
- Serafino Gentili (1775–1835), Italian opera singer
- Serafino Ghizzoni (born 1954), Italian former international rugby union footballer
- Serafino Macchiati (1861–1916), Italian painter
- Serafino Mazzarochi (1890–1961), Italian gymnast who competed in the 1912 Summer Olympics
- Serafino Mazzolini (1890–1945), Italian lawyer, politician and journalist
- Serafino Morazzone (1747–1822), Italian beatified Roman Catholic priest
- Serafino Murri (born 1966), Italian film critic, screenwriter and director
- Serafino Porrecta (1536–1614), Italian-Dominican theologian
- Serafino Ramazzotti (1846–1920), Italian painter and sculptor
- Serafino Razzi (1531–1613), Italian Dominican friar noted for his contributions to music and literature
- Serafino Romualdi (1900–1967), Italian writer, labour unionist and anti-fascist activist
- Serafino Secchi (died 1628), Roman Catholic Master of the Order of Preachers
- Serafino Serrati, 18th-century Italian Benedictine monk who practised or taught the physical sciences
- Serafino Sprovieri (1930–2018), Roman Catholic archbishop
- Serafino Tramezzini (1859–1893), Italian sculptor
- Serafino Vannutelli (1834–1915), Italian cardinal

=== Surname ===
- Daniela di Serafino (1966–2022), Italian applied mathematician and numerical analyst
- Domenico Serafino, Italian musician, composer, singer, music producer and former football club chairman
- Francesco Serafino (born 1997), Italian footballer
- Sophie Armstrong (born 1980), formerly known as Sophie Serafino, Canada-based Australian violinist and composer
- Vincenzo Serafino (died 1615), Roman Catholic Bishop of Teano

== Arts and entertainment ==
- Serafino (film), a 1968 Franco-Italian film by Pietro Germi
- Serafino (comics), a vagabond character in Italian comics
- Claudio Serafino, a character in the Tekken series

== See also ==
- San Serafino Church, Montegranaro, Italy
- Seraphino Antao (1937–2011), first Kenyan athlete to win a gold medal at the international level
- Serafin (disambiguation)
- Serafina
- Séraphin (disambiguation)
