= Serafin =

Serafin (Italian, Polish) or Serafín (Spanish) may refer to:

- Serafin (surname)
- Serafin (given name)
- Serafin (band), a London rock group
- Serafín (TV series), a Mexican telenovela
- Serafin, Masovian Voivodeship in east-central Poland

== See also ==
- Serafina
- Serafino (disambiguation)
- Serafine
- Seraph (disambiguation)
- Séraphin (disambiguation)
- Séraphine (disambiguation)
