= Serafim Šolaja =

Serbian cleric (1800–1853)

Serafim Šolaja (1800—1853) was among the first Serbian clerics who supported Vuk Karadžić's language reform at the time. He wrote an article entitled "The Žitomislić Monastery in Herzegovina or the Miliradović Endowment", published in the "Serbian-Dalmatian Magazine" in 1846 that propagated the eventual success of Vuk's work. He wrote: "A particular flourishing of this literary kind (in which history, legend, tradition and novelistic prose intertwine) will occur with the advent of periodicals in Bosnia and Herzegovina immediately after the Austro-Hungarian occupation."

== Biography ==
Stefan was born in Šibenik-Knin County in the Serbian village of Pađene in Dalmatia to father Jovan Šolaja; his mother died while giving him birth. His grandmother took care of him while he was growing up.

He went to school in nearby Krupa Monastery where he learned grammar, mathematics, science, Old Slavonic, and Znamenny chant. His teacher priest Makarije Vukadinović took him as a student to the parish of Opuzen, where he enrolled at a famous Community School. There he learned Italian and Latin.

Later, he went to the Žitomislić Monastery, near Mostar, where Metropolitan Josif I of the Eparchy of Zahumlje and Herzegovina) ordained him on 6 June 1826 as a deacon, and in the same year on 15 August as a priest. It was in that same monastery (Žitomislić) that Stefan also tonsured and was given the monastic name Serafim, according to the custom of the Serbian Orthodox Church.

At the same time, under the influence of Vuk Karadžić and Matica srpska, the Serbian population was aroused to creative activity. The first literary circle came into existence at Mostar, with founding members Serafim Šolaja, Prokopije Čokorilo and Joanikije Pamučina, who also subscribed to Vuk's Poslavnice and contributed articles to the "Serbian-Dalmatian Magazine"."Serbian-Dalmatian Magazine" was a link between middle and new Serbian literature, but also literature outside and literature emerging in Bosnia and Herzegovina; it also marked the beginnings of the literary activity of our priests. It was co-authored by Serafim Šolaja, Joanikije Pamučina, Prokopije Čokorilo, Jovan Sundečić, Ato Marković Slomo, Ivan Franjo Jukić, Nićifor Dučić. There were writers from the Military Krajina (Božidar Petranović, Nikola Begović, Petar Preradović), and many others. The rubrics on history, geography, and folklife, on antiquities, and on oral literature found their place in the first magazines to appear in Bosnia and Herzegovina.

Serafim served in Žitomislić until his death. He left an indelible impression on his people. Joanikije Pamučina described monk Serafim as "being of medium height, black and dark-eyed, with black hair and a black, long beard. Always impeccably dressed and dedicated to faith."

Šolaja died on 4 October 1853.
