= Seraphia =

Seraphia, Serafia, or Serapia may refer to:

- Serapia, a Roman Imperial religious festival devoted to the Greco-Egyptian god Serapis
- Saint Serapia (died c. 119), Roman saint
- María Mercedes Vial (1863–1942), Chilean feminist writer who wrote under the literary pseudonym Serafia

== See also ==
- Seraph (disambiguation)
