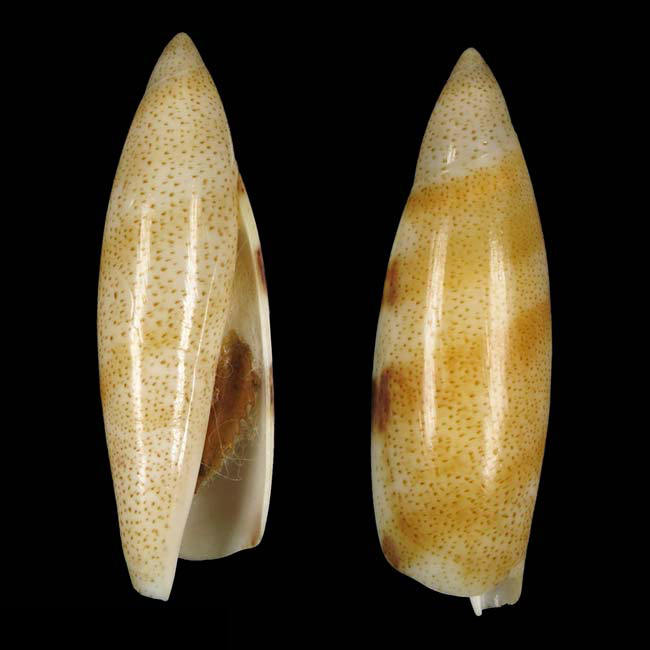

Scientific classification
- Kingdom: Animalia
- Phylum: Mollusca
- Class: Gastropoda
- Subclass: Caenogastropoda
- Order: Littorinimorpha
- Family: Seraphsidae
- Genus: Terebellum
- Species: T. hubrechti

Binomial name
- Terebellum hubrechti Poppe & Tagaro, 2016

= Terebellum hubrechti =

Species of gastropod

Terebellum hubrechti is a species of sea snail, a marine gastropod mollusk in the family Seraphsidae.

== Distribution ==
This marine species occurs in the coastal waters of the Philippines.

== Original description ==
- Poppe G.T. & Tagaro S. (2016). New marine mollusks from the central Philippines in the families Aclididae, Chilodontidae, Cuspidariidae, Nuculanidae, Nystiellidae, Seraphsidae and Vanikoridae. Visaya. 4(5): 83–103. page(s): 92.
