= Serafin (given name) =

Serafin or Serafín is a male given name. Notable people with the name include:

- Serafín Aedo (1908–1988), Spanish international footballer
- Serafín Ríos Álvarez (born 1959), Mexican politician
- Serafín Avendaño (1838–1916), Galician painter
- Serafin Baroja (1840–1912), Spanish writer and mining engineer
- Serafín Bejérez (1952–2022), Uruguayan farmer and politician
- Serafín Estébanez Calderón (1799–1867), Spanish writer
- Serafin R. Cuevas (1928–2014), Filipino lawyer
- Serafín Dengra (born 1961), Argentinian rugby union player
- Serafín Dengra (athlete) (1902–1966), Argentinian middle-distance runner
- Serafín Donderis (c. 1820 – c. 1885), Spanish military officer
- Ángel Serafín Seriche Dougan (born 1946), Equatorial Guinean politician
- Franz Serafin Exner (1849–1926), Austrian physicist and professor
- Serafín García (born 1975), Uruguayan footballer
- Serafin Geronimo, fictional main character from the 1998 Philippine action crime film of the same name
- José Serafín López (died 1935), Chilean politician
- Serafín Marsal (1862–1956), Paraguayan sculptor
- Serafín Martínez (born 1984), Spanish road cyclist
- Serafín García Menocal (1911–2003), Cuban-American political author and public speaker
- Franc Serafin Metelko (1789–1860), Slovene Roman Catholic priest, author and philologist
- Serafin Olarte (died 1821), Totonac chief and general
- Serafin Quiason Jr. (1930–2016), Filipino scholar and historian
- Serafín Rojo (1925–2003), Spanish cartoon humorist and painter
- Serafín Sánchez (1846–1896), Cuban patriot and abolitionist
- Serafin Szota (born 1999), Polish footballer
- Serafin Wiestner (born 1990), Swiss biathlete
- Serafín Zambada Ortiz (born 1990), American member of the Sinaloa cartel
- Serafín Zayas (born 1996), Argentinian badminton player
- Serafín Zubiri (born 1964), Spanish singer, composer and piano player

== See also ==
- Serafin (surname)
- Séraphin (disambiguation)
- Serafina
- Serafino (disambiguation)
