= Serafina =

Seraphina or Serafina is a feminine given name, derived from the word seraph, a high-ranking angel in the hierarchy of angels, and may refer to:

== Persons ==
- Saint Serafina (1238–1253), a thirteenth century Italian saint
- Seraphina Beh (born 1994), English actress
- Seraphina Sforza (c. 1434–1478), an Italian noblewoman and nun
- Serafina di Dio (1621–1699), Italian abbess
- Penny Serafina Petrone (1925–2005), a Canadian writer, educator, arts patron, and philanthropist
- Serafina Ouistiti, one of the several stage names of Dutch musician Bloem de Ligny (born 1978)
- Serafina Steer (born 1982), an English harpist, pianist, singer and songwriter

== Fictional characters ==
- Seraphina, an 1809 popular novel by Caroline Burney
- Seraphina, a 2012 fantasy novel by Rachel Hartman
- Serafina (Marvel), a super villain in the Marvel Comics Universe
- Serafina Pekkala, a fictional character in Phillip Pullman's His Dark Materials trilogy
- Dona Serafina, a fictional character in Don Rodriguez: Chronicles of Shadow Valley by Lord Dunsany
- Seraphina the Giraffe, a children's story book by Laurent de Brunhoff
- Seraphina Picquery, president of The Magical Congress of the US in the film Fantastic Beasts and Where to Find Them.
- Serafina, protagonist of Serafina and the Black Cloak and its sequels
- Serafina di Miromara, the protagonist in the Waterfire Saga by Jennifer Donnelly
- Seraphina, a major character in the video game Disgaea 5.
- Seraphina au Raa, a character appearing in Iron Gold and Dark Age, books four and five of Pierce Brown's Red Rising Saga.
- Seraphina, coprotagonist of webtoon unOrdinary, by uru-chan.

== Places ==
- Serafina, New Mexico, unincorporated community in New Mexico, United States
- Serafina Corrêa, municipality in the state Rio Grande do Sul, Brazil
- Serafina (restaurant), an Italian restaurant in Seattle, Washington, U.S.

== See also ==
- Séraphine (disambiguation), French equivalent
- Séraphin (disambiguation), masculine equivalent
- Serafin (disambiguation)
- Seraph (disambiguation)
- Sarafina! (disambiguation)
- Sarah, a common nickname for the name Seraphina
