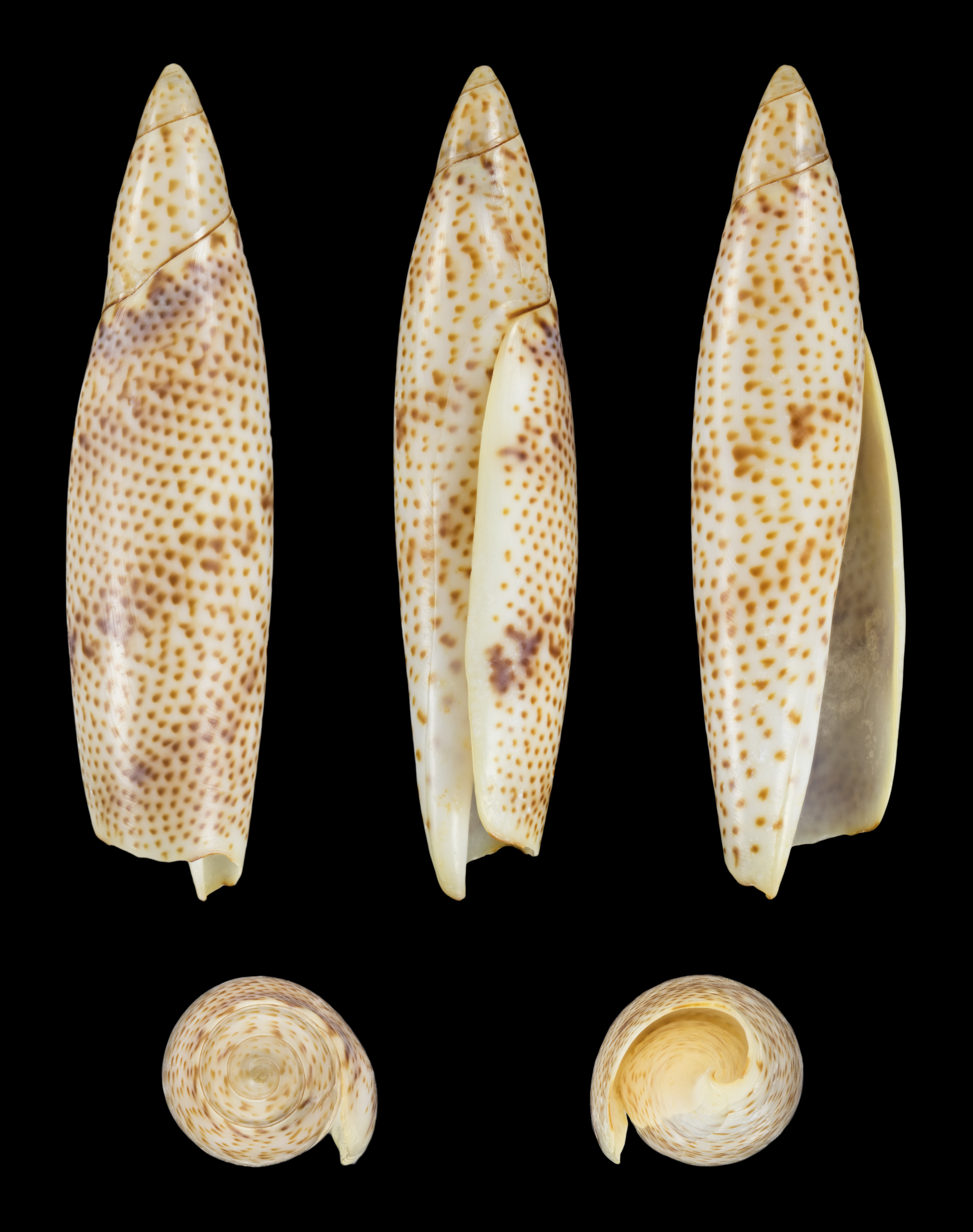

Scientific classification
- Kingdom: Animalia
- Phylum: Mollusca
- Class: Gastropoda
- Subclass: Caenogastropoda
- Order: Littorinimorpha
- Family: Seraphsidae
- Genus: Terebellum
- Species: T. terebellum

Binomial name
- Terebellum terebellum (Linnaeus, 1767)

Synonyms
- Conus terebellum Linnaeus, 1758; Terebellum lineatum Röding, 1798; Terebellum punctulatum Röding, 1798; Terebellum subulatum Lamarck, 1811; Terebellum terebellum f. lineatum Röding, 1798; Terebellum terebellum f. punctulatum Röding, 1798

= Terebellum terebellum =

Species of gastropod

Terebellum terebellum, common name the Terebellum conch, is a species of sea snail, a marine gastropod mollusk in the family Seraphsidae, the true conchs.

== Description ==
T. terebellum is a very active animal that can quickly bury itself in sand or swim away from danger. It uses its foot like a propeller to swim. Its shell is thin and fragile.

== Distribution ==
T. terebellum are found throughout the Indo-Pacific region.

== Phylogeny ==
- Strombidae
  - Terebellum terebellum
  - - Canarium urceus
    - - Conomurex luhuanus
      - - Tricornis raninus
        - - Lambis lambis
          - - Strombus
            - - Eustrombus
              - Aliger

Phylogeny and relationships of Strombidae according to Simone (2005)

The phylogenetic relationships among the Stromboidea have been accessed in 2005, by Simone. He proposed a cladogram (a tree of descent) based on an extensive morpho-anatomical analysis of representatives of Aporrhaidae, Strombidae, Xenophoridae and Struthiolariidae.

In his analysis, Simone recognized Strombidae as a monophyletic taxon supported by 13 synapomorphies (traits that are shared by two or more taxa and their most recent common ancestor), with at least eight distinct genera. He considered the genus Terebellum as the most basal taxon, distinguished from the remaining strombids by 13 synapomorphies, including a rounded foot. Though the genus Tibia was left out of the analysis, Simone regarded it as probably closely related to Terebellum, apparently due to some well known morphological similarities between them.
