= Seraphs (gastropod) =

Seraphs Temporal range: Danian–Aquitanian

Scientific classification
- Kingdom: Animalia
- Phylum: Mollusca
- Class: Gastropoda
- Subclass: Caenogastropoda
- Order: Littorinimorpha
- Family: Seraphsidae
- Genus: †Seraphs; Montfort, 1810

Type species
- Terebellum convolutum Lamarck, 1803

Genus of fossil molluscs

Seraphs is an extinct genus of sea snails in the family Seraphsidae. Like its modern relative Terebellum, Seraphs had a streamlined shell adapted for burrowing. The earliest species of Seraphs, Seraphs minus, dates to the Danian age of the early Paleocene, while the youngest known species of the genus, Seraphs subconvolutus, dates to the Aquitanian age of the Miocene. The type species of the genus is Terebellum convolutum, now considered a synonym of Seraphs volutatus.

== Species ==
- † Seraphs chilophorus (Cossmann, 1889)
- † Seraphs convolutus (Lamarck, 1803)
- † Seraphs leukoleptus P. Jung, 1974
- † Seraphs olivaceus (Cossmann, 1889)
- † Seraphs pisciformis (K. Martin, 1931)
- † Seraphs squamosus (K. Martin, 1914)
- † Seraphs volutatus (Solander, 1766)
