= San Serafino Church, Montegranaro =

Roman Catholic church in Montegranaro, Italy

San Serafino is a Roman Catholic church in Montegranaro, province of Fermo, in the region of Marche, Italy.

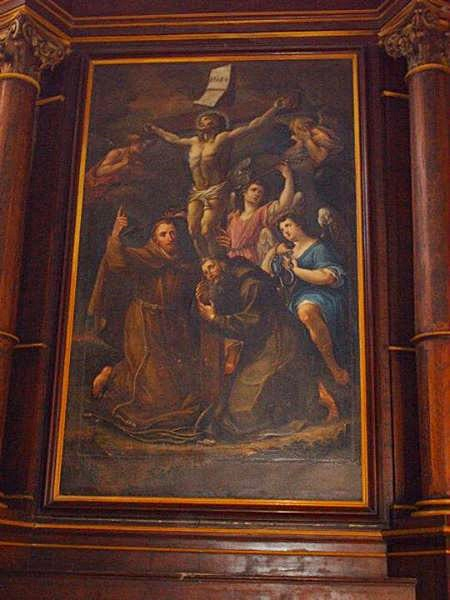

== History ==
The church is dedicated to St. Seraphin (1540–1604), who was born in Montegranaro. The saint's relics, however, repose in the Church of the Capuchins in Ascoli Piceno, where he died. This small chapel is notable for its wooden altar including paintings of San Lorenzo by Nicola Monti, and the patrons of the shoemakers: Saints Crispino and Crispiniano.
