= Santi Filippo e Giacomo, Montegranaro =

Building in Montegranaro, Italy

Coordinates: 43°13′55.8″N 13°37′52.2″E

Santi Filippo e Giacomo is a Baroque-style Roman Catholic church in Montegranaro, province of Fermo, in the region of Marche, Italy.

== History ==
A 10th century Romanesque church once stood at the site built adjacent to a Silvestrine monastery. The church was rebuilt in 1539; since 1220, the monastery had been assigned to the Benedictine order of the Abbey of Farfa. The present church was erected in 1760. It houses a Madonna with Saints Phillip and James by Federico Barocci.

Below the church is a former 10th century church, now converted into the crypt of Sant'Ugo, named for a local silvestrine monk. Some suspect the structure may derive from a late-Roman Empire building.

The church has a single nave, and has detached frescoes (1299) depicting a Nativity with St John the Baptist, an Adoration of the Shepherds, Martyrdom of Saint Barbara, a Baptism of Christ, a Pieta, and a Vergine dolente.
