= Prokopije Čokorilo =

Serbian Orthodox priest and writer (1802–1866)

Prokopije Čokorilo (born Procopius Tchokorilo; 1802–1866) was a Serbian Orthodox priest from Bosnia and Herzegovina who wrote several works in Serbian, Russian and Greek, his most well-known work being The Chronicles of Herzegovina.

== Early life ==
Petar Čokorilo was born in 1802 in Plana, Bileća, then part of the Sanjak of Herzegovina, Ottoman Empire (now Bosnia and Herzegovina). After graduating from a seminary he chose to become a monk, thus changing his first name to Prokopije. His ancestral name, however, is Milićević, though in the eighteenth century it was fashionable to call people's last name from the area where they came from. Hence, the Milićević name changed in time to Čokorilo, named after a valley called Čokorilovom Dolu in Prodoli, Herzegovina, where the family once lived and worked.

He received a good education in Sarajevo and Mostar, and the intellectual and altruistic interests of his later life are attested by his classical study and his membership in the Russian Royal Society. The important events in his life are reflected in his writings, which mark his shifts in religion and politics of the period. As a monk, he gained a considerable reputation as a traveller who raised funds for Serbian Orthodox Church, and Serbian schools for women and children in Bosnian schools in Herzegovina before he achieved the beginning of his real fame as a chronicler and historian. Prokopije Čokorilo, the rector of the Orthodox Church and Seminary in Mostar, had personal and literary links with Alexander Hilferding, the first Russian consul in Sarajevo (1856-1859). His contemporaries were Joanikije Pamučina (1810-1870), Nićifor Dučić, Vasa Pelagić, Staka Skenderova, and many others.

He died at Mostar in 1866.

== Work ==
Father Procopius left many books that are written in Serbian, Russian and Greek. He is better known for "The Chronicles of Herzegovina"., and a dictionary of Turkish expressions in Serbian. He also contributed articles for the Srbsko-dalmatinski Magazin. There, he wrote how Christians were forced to pay disproportionately higher taxes than Muslims, including the intentionally degrading non-Muslim poll-tax. In the first half of the nineteenth century, Prokopije Čokorilo wrote that his contemporary, the vizier (and all but unlimited ruler) Ali-paša Rizvanbegović of Herzegovina "taxed the dead for six years after their demise" and that his tax collectors "ran their fingers over the bellies of pregnant women, saying 'you will probably have a boy, so you have to pay the poll tax right away'". A folk saying from Bosnia well revels how taxes were exacted: "He's as fat as if he'd been tax collecting in Bosnia."
