= Joanikije Pamučina =

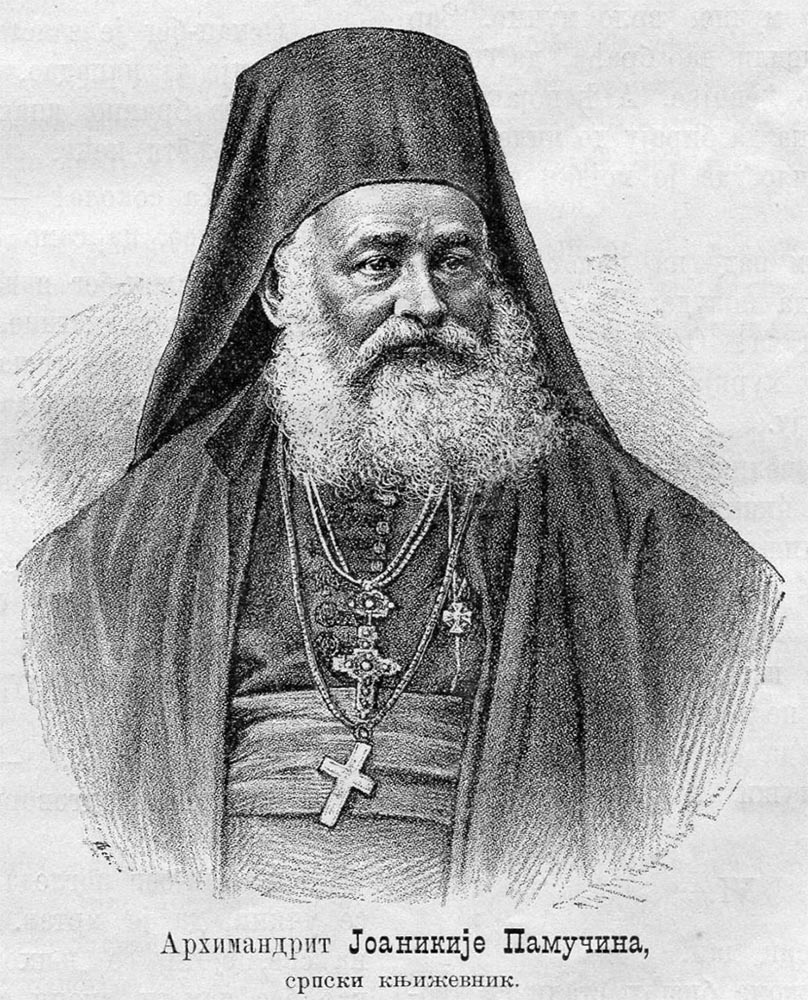
Joanikije Pamučina

Joanikije Pamučina (13 December 1810 in Zagradinje - 9 September 1870 in Mostar) was a Serbian writer, ethnologist, and spiritual leader of his people in Bosnia and Hercegovina. His seat was at the Metropolitanate of Zahumlije-Herzegovina in Mostar.

== Education ==
Joanikije Pamučina studied at Duži Monastery and later at Zavala Monastery, where he settled in 1829. Soon afterwards, he came to live in Mostar where he became well-known as a writer. There at the court of the Greek metropolitan he perfected his knowledge of the Greek language. He became an Archimandrite and, after the death of the Metropolitan Grigorius in 1860, he ruled until 1864 the Metropolitanate of Zahumlije-Herzegovina in Mostar, though without the title of Bishop or Metropolitan. The Patriarch of Constantinople did not want to appoint him as a metropolitan even though the people in Mostar wanted him.

== Literary work ==
Pamučina recorded folk compositions and poems, stories, axioms and proverbs, describing life and folk customs, preparing material for historical works. Most of his literary works were printed in the Srbsko-dalmatinski Magazine (1846-1864). He wrote a biography of Ali-paša Rizvanbegović, which is also the history of Herzegovina of that time. This work was translated in 1873 into Russian and printed in Aleksander Hilferding's writings (III, 330-379). Pamučina also portrayed folklore and history in the story Pobjedonosno mučenje Hristine Rajkovića Djevojčice (Glorious Martyrdom of the Virgin Hristina Rajković).

== Philanthropy ==
Joanikije Pamučina is also the founder of the Serbian National School in Mostar. He left 800 ducats at a state bank in Petrograd to a scholarship fund for underprivileged youth. His nephew was Metropolitan Leontije Radulović (1835-1888), who studied in Mostar.

== Legacy ==
In December 2010, the City of Mostar, marked the 200th anniversary of the birth of Joanikije Pamučina. His "Sabrana djela" (Collected Works, 2005) and Vojo Kovačević's book "Life and Work of Joanikije Pamucina" (2009) were presented to celebrants.

== See also ==
- Staka Skenderova
- Prokopije Čokorilo
