= Serapion =

Serapion /səˈreɪpiən/ is a given name, a variant of Seraphin.

It may refer to:

== Saints ==
- Serapion of Macedonia (died 195), martyr
- Serapion of Antioch, Patriarch of Antioch from 191 to 211
- Serapion of Thmuis (c. 300–360), Christian monk and Bishop of Thmuis
- Serapion the Sindonite (died 356), Egyptian monk and saint
- Serapion of Algiers (1179–1240), English, possibly Scottish, Catholic Mercedarian priest and martyr

== Others ==
- Serapion of Alexandria, 3rd century BC Greek physician
- Serapion (strategos), probably negotiated in 48 BC for Caesar with Achillas, strategos of Cyprus in 43 BC, executed in 41 BC
- Serapion, 3rd century neoplatonic philosopher, one of the disciples of Plotinus
- Yahya ibn Sarafyun, also known as Serapion the Elder, 9th century Christian physician
- Serapion the Younger, 12th or 13th century physician who wrote The Book of Simple Medicine (in Arabic)
- Serapion of Vladimir (died 1275), Russian Orthodox Bishop of Vladimir
- Serapion of Novgorod (died 1516), Russian Orthodox archbishop
- Serapion (Coptic bishop of Los Angeles) (born 1951), first hierarch and bishop of the Coptic Orthodox Diocese of Los Angeles
- Serapion Kolosnitsin (1964–2025), Russian Orthodox archbishop of Kokshetau and Akmola

== See also ==
- Mara bar Serapion, 1st century Syriac Stoic philosopher
- Sarapion, an ancient port city in what is now south-central Somalia
- Saint Serapion (Zurbarán), an oil on canvas painting by the Spanish artist Francisco de Zurbarán
- Serapion Brothers, a literary movement in the early Soviet Union
