= Montegranaro =

- Comune
- Comune di Montegranaro
- Coat of arms

- Location within Italy Location within Marche
- Coordinates: 43°14′N 13°38′E
- Country: Italy
- Region: Marche
- Province: Fermo (FM)
- Frazioni: Guazzetti, Santa Leandra, Santa Maria, San Tommaso, Vallone, San Liborio Villa Lucani il Torrione

Government
  - Mayor: Endrio Ubaldi

Area
  - Total: 31.25 km^{2} (12.07 sq mi)
- Elevation: 279 m (915 ft)

Population (30 November 2017)
  - Total: 12,892
  - Density: 412.5/km^{2} (1,068/sq mi)
- Demonym: Montegranaresi
- Time zone: UTC+1 (CET)
  - Summer (DST): UTC+2 (CEST)
- Postal code: 63812
- Dialing code: 0734
- Patron saint: St. Seraphin
- Saint day: 12 October
- Website: Official website

Montegranaro is a comune (municipality) in the Province of Fermo in the Italian region of Marche, located about 45 km (28 mi) south of Ancona and about 45 km (28 mi) north of Ascoli Piceno. It is one of the main centres for shoe production in Italy.

== Main sights ==
Churches in the town include:

- San Serafino
- San Francesco
- Santi Filippo e Giacomo
- Crypt of Sant'Ugo

== Twin towns ==
- Oppeano, Italy
- Aiello del Sabato, Italy
