= Mikhail Plyatskovsky =

Soviet playwright, songwriter and poet (1935–1991)

- Born: 2 November 1935; Rykovo, Donetsk Oblast, USSR
- Died: 26 January 1991 (aged 55); Moscow, USSR
- Education: Maxim Gorky Literature Institute
- Occupations: Poet, playwright, songwriter

Mikhail Spartakovich Plyatskovsky (Russian: Михаи́л Спарта́кович Пляцко́вский; 1935–1991) was a Soviet playwright, poet and songwriter.

== Biography ==
Born 2 November 1935 in Rykovo (present-day Yenakiyeve). He graduated from the Maxim Gorky Literature Institute in Moscow.

He was a member of the Union of Soviet Writers (1973).

He worked in collaboration with Vladimir Shainsky, Serafim Tulikov, Vyacheslav Dobrynin, Yuri Antonov, Arno Babajanian.

Plyatskovsky died on 26 January 1991. He was buried in Moscow on Troyekurovskoye Cemetery.

== Works ==
The first professional song written by composer Semyon Zaslavsky "March of the Astronauts". Between 1960 and 1970, Plyatskovsky became one of the leading songwriters. Popular songs written using his poems include:

- "Take a Guitar"
- "Volga Flows into My Heart"
- "All the Same, We Will Meet"
- "If There Is Love"
- "Cuckoo"
- "Once Again About Love"
- "Redhead Blizzard"
- "Slides"
- "You Invented Herself"
- "If You Are Good"
- "I'll Take You to the Tundra"
- "The Girl from Apartment 45"
- "Letkajenkka"
- "No Wonder the People I Talked"
- "The Roof of Your House"
- "Do Not Care About Me"
- "Do Not Repeat This Ever"

== Awards ==
- Lenin Komsomol Prize (1986) – for pioneering songs
- Order of the Badge of Honour

== See also ==
- List of people from Moscow
- List of playwrights
- List of songwriters
