= Silvio Sérafin =

French footballer (1938–2021)

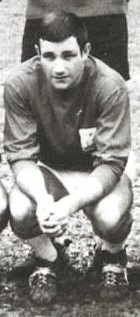

Personal information
- Date of birth: 3 April 1938
- Place of birth: Algrange, France
- Date of death: 19 February 2021 (aged 82)
- Place of death: Châtellerault, France
- Height: 1.70 m (5 ft 7 in)
- Position: Defender

Senior career*
Years	Team	Apps	(Gls)
1957–1961	FC Nancy	42	(10)
1961–1962	Forbach	30	(6)
1962–1963	RC Franc-Comtois	36	(14)
1963–1964	FC Nancy	28	(8)
1964–1966	Angers	52	(16)
1966–1970	Angoulême	150	(35)
Total		338	(89)
- * Club domestic league appearances and goals

Silvio Sérafin (3 April 1938 – 19 February 2021) was a French footballer who played as a defender. He was the older brother of fellow footballer Jean Sérafin.

== Biography ==
Sérafin grew up in Tucquegnieux and spent his teenage years as a miner in Lorraine. He and his brother Jean were prolific football prospects and were recruited by clubs such as Metz, FC Nancy, Reims, and Valenciennes. He joined the club FC Nancy in 1957 at the age of 19. He was then loaned to Forbach and RC Franc-Comtois from 1961 to 1963 before returning to Nancy the latter year. However, once the club was relegated into Division 2, he left for Angers of Division 1 in 1964. In 1966, he joined Angoulême, where he would play the remainder of his professional career. In 1970, the club refused to renew his contract, despite the fact that he wanted to stay.

In 1970, Sérafin joined SO Châtellerault, which was a part of the French Amateur Football Championship at the time of his signing but was promoted to Division 3 the following year. He left the team in 1975. After his professional career, he operated a café in Châtellerault for 20 years, while continuing to play amateur football for various teams throughout the 1980s and 90s.

Sérafin died in Châtellerault on 19 February 2021 at the age of 82.
