= Thomas J. Serafin =

American lay Roman Catholic author

Thomas J. Serafin is an American lay Roman Catholic author and Christian relics advocate, collector and expert.

Serafin is the founder of the International Crusade for Holy Relics and Saints Alive, which was the first internet website on the propagating the cultus of relics. He is also President and CEO of the Apostolate for Holy Relics (AHR), a non-profit tax-exempt 501C3 organization. The AHR is the first officially sanctioned Catholic lay apostolate of its kind. He wrote Relics -The Forgotten Sacramental and contributed the article on relics to the Encyclopedia of Catholic Devotions.

For his devotion to the proper veneration of relics and for his teaching of the faithful he was awarded the honor of being Knighted "Chevalier" in the Order of the Immaculate Conception of Vila Viçosa, Knight Commander of the Order of Saint Michael of the Wing, and Officer in the Order of the Dragon of Annam.
