= Serafim Kalliadasis =

Greek applied mathematician and chemical engineer

Serafim Kalliadasis FIMA FInstP APSFellow FIChemE
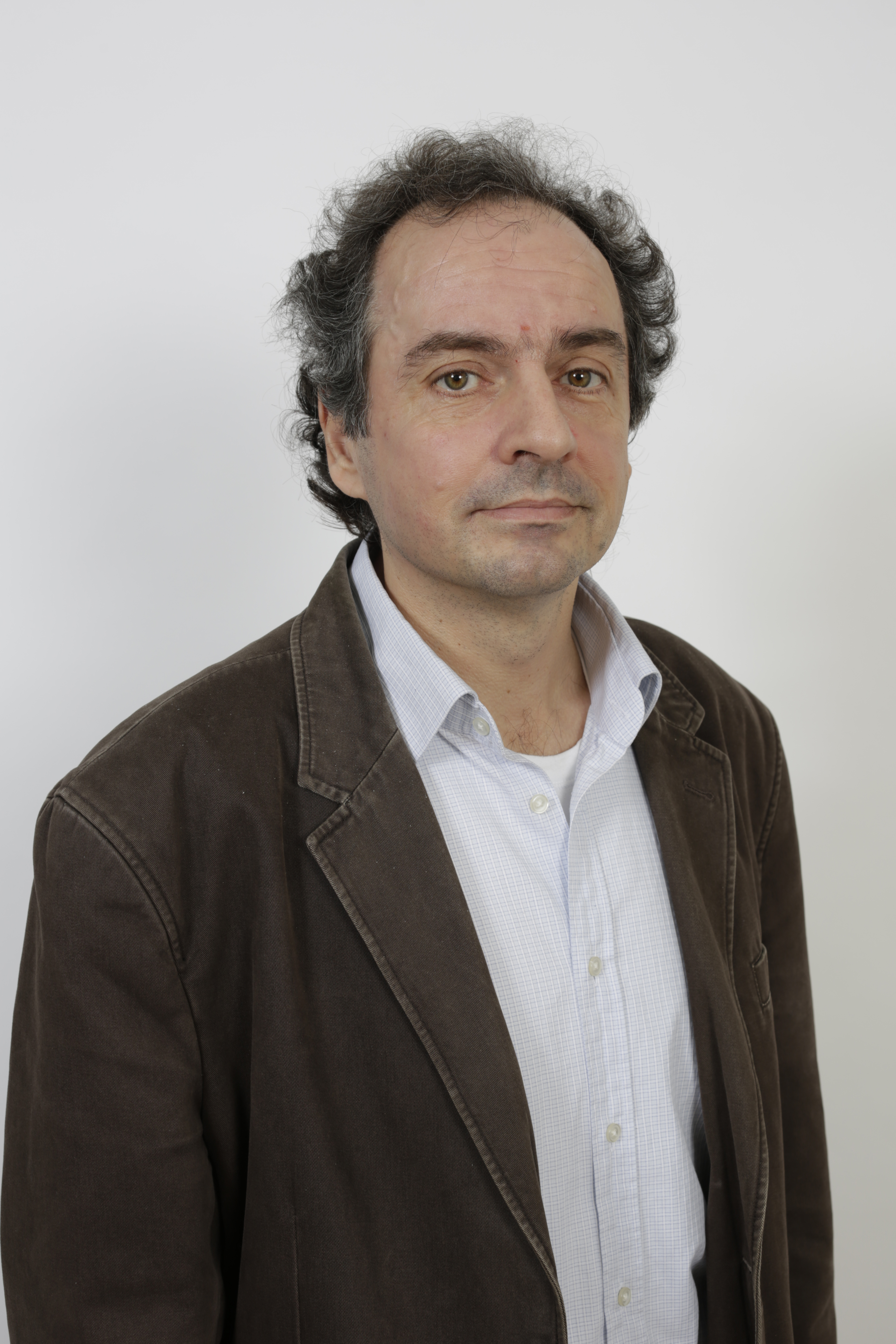
- Education: Aristotle University of Thessaloniki (Dipl.Ing.); University of Notre Dame, USA (DPhil)
- Known for: Mathematical modelling of falling liquid films
- Scientific career
- Fields: Interdisciplinary applied mathematics, engineering science, complex multiscale systems, classical density functional theory
- Workplaces: Imperial College London
- Thesis: Self-similar interfacial and wetting dynamics (1994)
- Doctoral advisor: Hsueh-Chia Chang
- Website: Personal website Complex Multiscale Systems

Serafim Kalliadasis is an applied mathematician and chemical engineer working at Imperial College London since 2004.

== Career ==
Serafim Kalliadasis earned a five-year undergraduate degree in chemical engineering at the Polytechnic School of the Aristotle University of Thessaloniki, Greece. He graduated in 1989. In 1990 he started his PhD studies at the University of Notre Dame, USA. His doctoral thesis was in the general of fluid dynamics and was supervised by Prof. Hsueh-Chia Chang.

Following his PhD in 1994 he moved on to the University of Bristol, UK, as post-doctoral fellow in applied mathematics.

In 1995 he took up his first academic position at the Chemical Engineering Department of the University of Leeds, UK. In 2004 he was appointed to Readership in Fluid Mechanics at Department of Chemical Engineering, Imperial College, UK, in 2004 and was promoted to Professor in Engineering Science & Applied Mathematics at Imperial College in 2010.

== Research ==
Serafim Kalliadasis' expertise is in the interface between Applied and Computational Mathematics, Complex Systems and Engineering, covering both fundamentals and applications. He leads the Complex Multiscale Systems Group of Imperial College London.

== Distinctions ==
- 2020, Institute of Mathematics and its Applications Fellow.
- 2019, Institute of Physics Fellow.
- 2014, American Physical Society Fellow. Citation reads: "For pioneering and rigorous contributions to fundamental fluid dynamics, particularly interfacial flows and dynamics of moving contact lines, statistical mechanics of inhomogeneous liquids, and coarse graining of complex multiscale systems."
- 2010–2016, ERC Frontier Research Advanced Investigator Grant holder.
- 2009, Corporate Member and Fellow of IChemE.
- 2004–2009, EPSRC Advanced Fellowship.

== Selected publications ==
1. Carrillo, José A.; Kalliadasis, Serafim; Perez, Sergio P.; Shu, Chi-Wang (January 2020). "Well-Balanced Finite-Volume Schemes for Hydrodynamic Equations with General Free Energy". Multiscale Modeling & Simulation. 18 (1): 502–541. arXiv:1812.00980. doi:10.1137/18M1230050.
2. Gomes, Susana N.; Kalliadasis, Serafim; Pavliotis, Grigorios A.; Yatsyshin, Petr (6 March 2019). "Dynamics of the Desai-Zwanzig model in multiwell and random energy landscapes". Physical Review E. 99 (3) 032109. arXiv:1810.06371. Bibcode:2019PhRvE..99c2109G. doi:10.1103/PhysRevE.99.032109. PMID 30999473.
3. Schmuck, M.; Pavliotis, G.A.; Kalliadasis, S. (January 2019). "Recent advances in the evolution of interfaces: thermodynamics, upscaling, and universality". Computational Materials Science. 156: 441–451. doi:10.1016/j.commatsci.2018.08.026. hdl:10044/1/65637.
4. Yatsyshin, P.; Parry, A. O.; Rascón, C.; Kalliadasis, S. (18 August 2018). "Wetting of a plane with a narrow solvophobic stripe". Molecular Physics. 116 (15–16): 1990–1997. Bibcode:2018MolPh.116.1990Y. doi:10.1080/00268976.2018.1473648. hdl:10016/29071.
5. Yatsyshin, P; Durán-Olivencia, M-A; Kalliadasis, S (11 July 2018). "Microscopic aspects of wetting using classical density functional theory". Journal of Physics: Condensed Matter. 30 (27): 274003. Bibcode:2018JPCM...30A4003Y. doi:10.1088/1361-648X/aac6fa. hdl:10044/1/60176. PMID 29786608.
6. Dallaston, Michael C.; Fontelos, Marco A.; Tseluiko, Dmitri; Kalliadasis, Serafim (19 January 2018). "Discrete Self-Similarity in Interfacial Hydrodynamics and the Formation of Iterated Structures". Physical Review Letters. 120 (3) 034505. arXiv:1609.05938. Bibcode:2018PhRvL.120c4505D. doi:10.1103/PhysRevLett.120.034505. PMID 29400525.
7. Braga, Carlos; Smith, Edward R.; Nold, Andreas; Sibley, David N.; Kalliadasis, Serafim (28 July 2018). "The pressure tensor across a liquid-vapour interface". The Journal of Chemical Physics. 149 (4) 044705. arXiv:1711.05986. Bibcode:2018JChPh.149d4705B. doi:10.1063/1.5020991. PMID 30068201.
8. Schmuck, M.; Kalliadasis, S. (January 2017). "Rate of Convergence of General Phase Field Equations in Strongly Heterogeneous Media Toward Their Homogenized Limit". SIAM Journal on Applied Mathematics. 77 (4): 1471–1492. doi:10.1137/16M1079646.
9. Nold, Andreas; Goddard, Benjamin D.; Yatsyshin, Peter; Savva, Nikos; Kalliadasis, Serafim (April 2017). "Pseudospectral methods for density functional theory in bounded and unbounded domains". Journal of Computational Physics. 334: 639–664. arXiv:1701.06182. Bibcode:2017JCoPh.334..639N. doi:10.1016/j.jcp.2016.12.023.
10. Durán-Olivencia, Miguel A; Yatsyshin, Peter; Goddard, Benjamin D; Kalliadasis, Serafim (7 December 2017). "General framework for fluctuating dynamic density functional theory". New Journal of Physics. 19 (12): 123022. Bibcode:2017NJPh...19l3022D. doi:10.1088/1367-2630/aa9041. hdl:10044/1/51664.
