= Serafim Sudbinin =

Russian sculptor

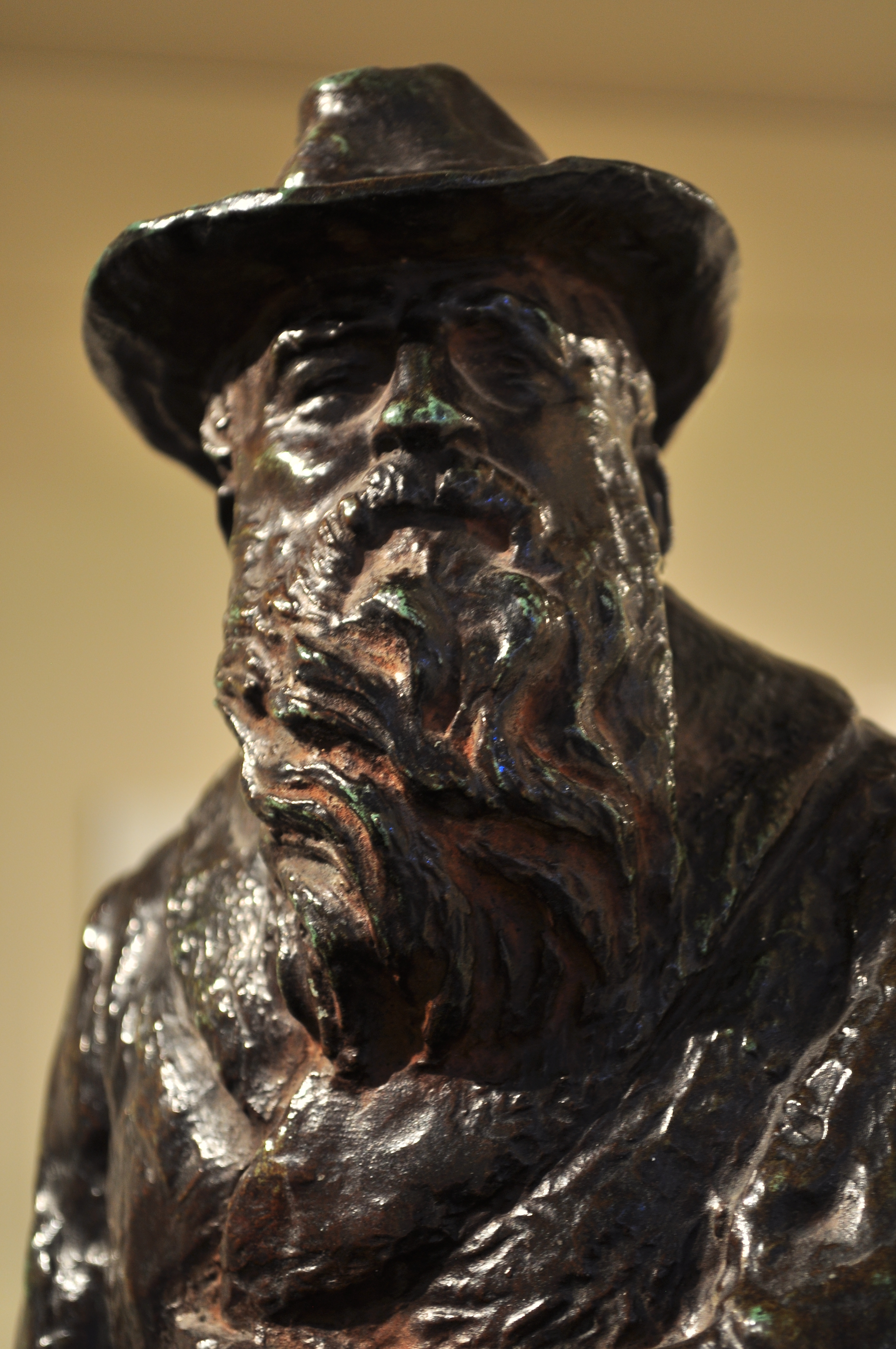
- "Seraphin Soudbinine" by Auguste Rodin, 1910
- Born: Serafim Nikolayevich Golovastikov; 21 March 1867; Nizhny Novgorod, Russian Empire
- Died: 1 November 1944 (aged 77); Paris, France
- Occupations: Sculptor, painter, stage actor

Signature
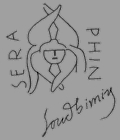

Serafim Nikolayevich Sudbinin (Russian: Серафим Николаевич Судьбинин, born Golovastikov, Головастиков, known in France as Séraphin Soudbinine; 21 March 1867 – 1 November 1944) was a Russian sculptor, painter, ceramicist and stage actor, associated with the Moscow Art Theatre.

== Biography ==
Born in Nizhny Novgorod to a family of the staroobryadtsy merchants, Serafim Golovastikov debuted on stage the Nizhny Drama Theatre in the late 1880s, where he adopted the stage name Sudbinin.

In May 1898 Sudbinin joined the Stanislavski-led Moscow Art Theatre's original troupe and took part in its very first production, Tsar Fyodor Ioannovich (in which he played both Shuysky and Mstislavsky). In the course of the next several years he took part in all this company's major productions, including Men Above the Law (by Alexey Pisemsky, 1898), Antigone (1899), The Death of Ivan the Terrible (by Alexey K. Tolstoy, Sitsky, Bityagovsky, 1899), Twelfth Night (1899), Snow Maiden (by Alexander Ostrovsky, 1900, Father Frost), The Philistines (by Maxim Gorky, 1902), The Power of Darkness (by Leo Tolstoy, 1902). He was a substitute for Stanislavsky as Vershinin in Chekhov's The Three Sisters, as well as Satin in The Lower Depths.

In the early 1900s Sudbinin became increasingly interested in sculpture, painting and photography. His first major work was the statuette of Stanislavsky as Doctor Stockman (the hero of Ibsen's play of the same name). Sudbinin gave it as a souvenir to Maxim Gorky, and it is now exposed at the Gorky Museum in Nizhny.

After visiting Paris in 1904, Sudbinin decided to devote himself to sculpture. A grant awarded by Savva Morozov enabled him to study sculpture under Leopold Sinaeff-Bernstein (until 1906) and Auguste Rodin (from 1906), which he would later become an assistant of. After exhibiting a series of Sleeping Monsters at the Salon dAutomne (1906), he became a member of the Union of Russian Artists (1906) and Salon d'Automne (1908).

His best-known sculptures include "Sisyphus", "Cherubini at Rest", "Maxim Gorky", "Anna Pavlova", "Fyodor Chalyapin", "Chalyapin as Romeo", "Skryabin" and "Leonid Sobinov". His exhibitions, at the Moscow Fellowship of Artists (1903), Salon d'Automne (from 1906), Salon de la Nationale, Sergei Makovsky Salon (1909), Union of Russian Artists (1906–16), Les Ballets Russes de Serge Diaghilev in Paris (1939), international exhibitions in Venice (1907), Munich (1909) and Rome (1911) and the exhibitions of Russian art in Paris (1906, 1920, 1932), Venice (1920), London (1921), New York City (1923), Belgrade (1930) and Prague (1935), as well as one-man shows in New York (1923), Paris (1934, 1939) and San Francisco (1935), won him much critical acclaim.

After the October Revolution Sudbinin left Soviet Russia for Paris. He visited the United States (1922–24), where he created ceramic vases and animal figurines. In an air raid during World War II, his Paris studio was destroyed. Serafim Sudbinin died on 1 November 1944 in Paris.

In 2017, the Legion of Honor, San Francisco exhibited Séraphin Soudbinine: From Rodin’s Assistant to Ceramic Artist; the Museum also owns several of Soudbinine’s works.
