= Seraphim Papakostas =

Greek advocate (1892–1954)

Archimandrite Seraphim Papakostas (1892 – 1954) was the Superior of the Zoe Brotherhood movement in Greece from 1927 to 1954. Zoe was founded in 1907 by Archimandrite Eusebius Matthopoulos (1849–1929), an earlier follower and collaborator of Apostolos Makrakis, as an extra-ecclesiastical, semi-monastic organization patterned on religious orders in the West.

== Life and authorship ==
Archimandrite Seraphim (Papakostas) was born in a mountain village of central Greece in 1892, and died in Athens in 1954. He studied theology at the University of Athens, thereafter serving as a high school teacher for two years, and later as a preacher at the Cathedral of Athens.

Father Seraphim passed the last twenty-five years of his life in the capacity of Superior of the "ZOE" Brotherhood of Theologians, (Note: "The aim of this Brotherhood has been to develop an intense spiritual life among the Greek people. To this end, the Brotherhood trains preachers, confessors, and Sunday School teachers and publishes the weekly journal "ZOE", as well as numerous instructive books of spiritual content.") which was established by his predecessor, Archimandrite Eusebius Matthopoulos. (Note: A biography of Archimandrite Matthopoulos was published in English by the S.P.C.K., London.)

As Superior of "ZOE", Father Seraphim Papacostas developed all of the groups under the Brotherhood, contributing to the establishment of associations for parents, the educated, the young working class, students and educators.

Father Seraphim was distinguished as an author. Three of his books, The Parables of Christ, The Miracles of Christ and The Sermon on the Mount, became classics for the Orthodox in Greece. His liturgical works, Baptism, and A Handbook of the Divine Liturgy, were also of great significance.

In his writings he also dealt with modern social problems. In The Problem of Parenthood and Birth Control, Morality and Health, Between the Two Wars, Postwar Problems and For the Hours of Pain, he attempted to provide counsels for the difficulties of our times. All of these books had a widespread circulation in Greece, with successive editions being published and warmly received.

However, of all of his books, Repentance had the most extensive circulation, having been published repeatedly.

== Criticism ==
Professor Christos Yannaras has remarked that: "like Matthopoulos he wrote like a Protestant pietist. In his book The Question of Conception, Papakostas faithfully follows Anglican and Roman Catholic opinion about contraception, presented as a quintessentially Orthodox view."

== Sources ==
- Archimandrite Seraphim Papacostas. REPENTANCE. 3rd Edition; Transl. from the 12th Greek edition. Athens: "ZOE" Brotherhood of Theologians, 1987. pp. 5–7.
