= Serafim Moysidis =

Greek footballer

Personal information
- Date of birth: 17 April 1990 (age 36)
- Place of birth: Athens, Greece
- Height: 1.83 m (6 ft 0 in)
- Position: Centre back

Team information
- Current team: AEEK SYN.KA

Senior career*
Years	Team	Apps	(Gls)
2010–2012	Vyzas Megara	30	(1)
2012–2013	Anagennisi Giannitsa	33	(3)
2013–2014	Apollon Kalamarias	19	(0)
2014–2015	Panegialios	12	(0)
2015–2016	Apollon Kalamarias	0	(0)
2016–2017	Panegialios	27	(0)
2017	Niki Volos		
2018–2019	Edessaikos		
2019–	AEEK SYN.KA		
- * Club domestic league appearances and goals as of 5 April 2018

Serafim Moysidis (Greek: Σεραφείμ Μωυσίδης; born 14 April 1990) is a Greek football player currently playing for AEEK SYN.KA.

== Career ==
On 10 July 2019 it was confirmed, that Moysidis had joined AEEK SYN.KA.
