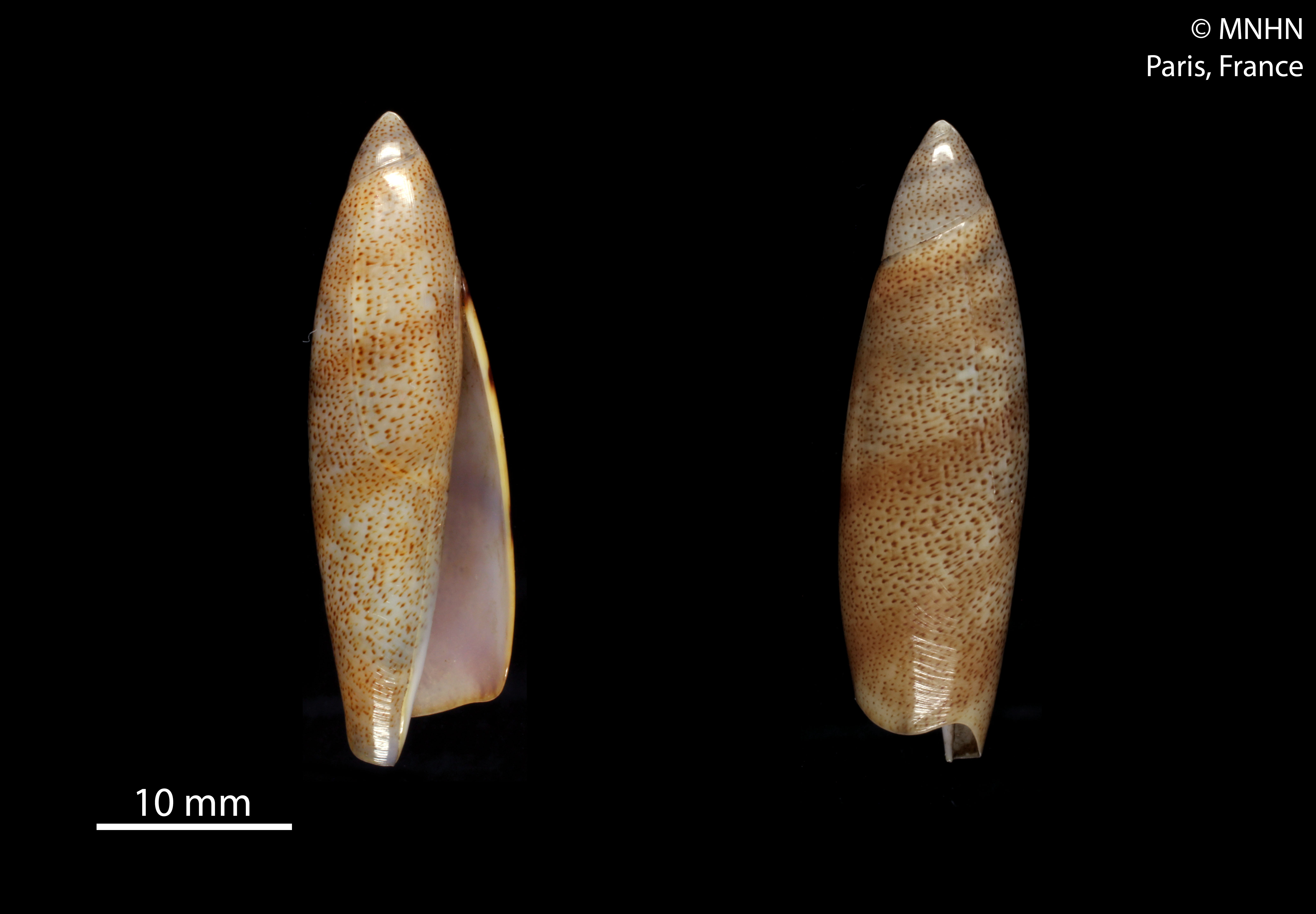
- Shell of Terebellum hubrechti

Scientific classification
- Kingdom: Animalia
- Phylum: Mollusca
- Class: Gastropoda
- Subclass: Caenogastropoda
- Order: Littorinimorpha
- Superfamily: Stromboidea
- Family: Seraphsidae
- Genus: Terebellum; Bruguière, 1798

Type species
- Conus terebellum Linnaeus, 1758

Synonyms
- Artopoia Gistel, 1848 (invalid: unnecessary substitute name for Terebellum); Lucis Gistel, 1848; Terebrina Rafinesque, 1815 (invalid: unnecessary substitute name for Terebellum)

= Terebellum (gastropod) =

Genus of gastropods

Terebellum is a genus of sea snails, marine gastropod mollusks in the family Seraphsidae, the Terebellum conchs.

== Species ==
Species within the genus Terebellum include:

- † Terebellum cinctum K. Martin, 1916
- Terebellum delicatum (Kuroda, T. & Kawamoto, 1956)
- Terebellum hubrechti (Poppe, G.T. & S.P. Tagaro, 2016
- † Terebellum humilispirum Raven, 2021
- † Terebellum koeneni Marquet, Lenaerts & Laporte, 2016
- † Terebellum olympiae Rolando, 2001
- † Terebellum papilliferum K. Martin, 1916
- Terebellum simoni Dekkers, S. J. Maxwell & Congdon, 2019
- Terebellum terebellum (Linnaeus, 1767)

Species brought into synonymy

- † Terebellum chilophorum Cossmann, 1889: synonym of † Seraphs chilophorus (Cossmann, 1889) (superseded combination)
- † Terebellum convolutum Lamarck, 1803: synonym of † Seraphs convolutus (Lamarck, 1803) (original combination)
- Terebellum cylindrarium (Pallas, 1766) : synonym of Nereis cylindraria Pallas, 1766
- † Terebellum eratoides Cossmann, 1889: synonym of † Miniseraphs eratoides (Cossmann, 1889) (superseded combination)
- † Terebellum isabella Deshayes, 1865: synonym of † Miniseraphs isabella (Deshayes, 1865) (superseded combination)
- Terebellum lineatum Röding, 1798 : synonym of Terebellum terebellum (Linnaeus, 1758)
- Terebellum maculosum A. Adams, 1848: synonym of Terebellum subulatum Lamarck, 1811: synonym of Terebellum terebellum (Linnaeus, 1758) (junior synonym)
- † Terebellum olivaceum Cossmann, 1889: synonym of † Seraphs olivaceus (Cossmann, 1889) (superseded combination)
- Terebellum punctulatum Röding, 1798 : synonym of Terebellum terebellum (Linnaeus, 1758)
- Terebellum striatum Koenen, 1889 † : synonym of Terebellum koeneni Marquet, Lenaerts & Laporte, 2016 † (invalid: junior homonym of Terebellum striatum Tuomey & Holmes, 1857; T. koeneni is a replacement name)
- Terebellum subulatum Lamarck, 1811 : synonym of Terebellum terebellum (Linnaeus, 1758)
