= Serafim (footballer) =

Brazilian footballer

Personal information
- Full name: João Vieira dos Santos
- Date of birth: 3 May 1940 (age 86)
- Place of birth: Morrinhos, Brazil
- Position: Defender

Senior career*
Years	Team	Apps	(Gls)
1957–1960	América-GO		
1961–1963	Uberlândia		
1964–1965	São Paulo	20	(1)
1966–1970	União Bandeirante		
- * Club domestic league appearances and goals as of 28 December 2023

João Vieira dos Santos (born 3 May 1940), better known as Serafim, is a Brazilian former professional footballer who played as a defender.

== Career ==
Serafim began his playing career at the age of 15 at América in Morrinhos, Goiás. At the age of 21 he was signed by Uberlândia, EC and in 1964 he arrived at São Paulo FC, where he was a reserve player most of the time. His main performance for the club was against Palmeiras, 15 November 1964, in the historic 5–2 victory. He also played for União Bandeirates at the end of his career. Serafim lives in the city of Bandeirantes, Paraná to this day, where he owns a bar.
