= Serapion Kolosnitsin =

Russian Orthodox prelate (1964–2025)

- Archbishop of Kokshetau and Akmola
- Native name: Серапион
- Church: Russian Orthodox Church
- Predecessor: None
- Successor: Barsanuphius Vinichenko

Orders
- Rank: Archbishop

Personal details
- Born: Sergey Sergeyevich Kolosnitsin; 6 July 1964 Podgorny, Dzhambul Region, Kazakh SSR, USSR
- Died: 28 January 2025 (aged 60) Nizhny Novgorod Oblast, Russia
- Denomination: Eastern Orthodox Church

Archbishop Serapion (Russian: архиепископ Серапион, secular name Sergey Sergeyevich Kolosnitsin, Russian: Сергей Сергеевич Колосницин; 6 July 1964 – 28 January 2025) was a Bishop of the Russian Orthodox Church, who headed the Diocese of Kokshetau and Akmola from 2013 to 2025.

== Biography ==
He was born on 6 July 1964 in Podgorny, Dzhambul Region, Kazakh SSR, USSR. After finishing secondary school in 1981, he served the Soviet Army from 1982 and 1984. On 3 July 1988, he was tonsured as a monk. In 1993, he graduated from Moscow Theological Academy.

By the decision of the Holy Synod, Serapion was elected Bishop of Kokshetau and Akmola on 2 October 2013. He was named Bishop of Kokshetau and Akmola on 22 October 2013, and consecrated as bishop the day after. On 6 May 2022, Patriarch Kirill of Moscow and all Russia elevated Serapion to the rank of Archbishop in the Cathedral of Christ the Saviour.

On 28 January 2025, while he was travelling from Kokshetau to Moscow, he was killed in a traffic collision on the M12 highway in the Nizhny Novgorod Oblast, Russia.
