= Sarafina! =

Sarafina! or Sarafina may refer to:

- Sarafina (horse), a French Thoroughbred racehorse
- Sarafina (The Lion King), a Lion King character
- Sarafina! (musical), a 1987 South African musical
  - Sarafina! (film), a 1992 South African-American film based on the musical
- Sarafina Nance, American science communicator and astrophysicist
