= Serafim de Freitas =

Portuguese jurist and canon lawyer (died 1633)

Franciscus Serafim de Freitas (also Seraphim or Seraphinus; c. 1570 – 8 March 1633) was a Portuguese jurist and canon lawyer.

Franciscus Serafim de Freitas was born in Lisbon about 1570. He attended the Jesuit school Colégio de Santo Antão in Lisbon and the University of Coimbra, where he received a doctorate in canon law on 25 October 1595 or 1598. De Freitas taught at the University of Valladolid, where he was the Vespers Professor of Canon Law. In Valladolid, he became a member of the Order of the Blessed Virgin Mary of Mercy. At some point, he became the representative of Portugal's military orders in the kingdom of Castile.

He wrote a book called De iusto imperio Lusitanorum asiatico, published in Valladolid in 1624. The book rejects the theories of Hugo Grotius presented in Mare Liberum. Anthony Pagden describes it as a "point-by-point refutation" of Mare Liberum. De iusto imperio defends the papal donation, two sets of bulls by which Pope Nicholas V, in 1454, and Pope Alexander VI, in 1493, purported to give the Catholic monarchs of Portugal and Spain, respectively, the prerogative to explore the Americas. A French translation of De iusto by Alfred Guichon de Grandpont was published in 1882.

De Freitas died in Madrid on 8 March 1633.

== Sources ==
- Alexandrowicz, Charles Henry (18 May 2017) [1959]. "Freitas Versus Grotius (1959)". The Law of Nations in Global History. Oxford University Press. pp. 121–139. doi:10.1093/acprof:oso/9780198766070.003.0009.
- Knight, W. S. M. (1925). "Seraphin de Freitas: Critic of Mare Liberum". Transactions of the Grotius Society. 11: 1–9. ISSN 1479-1234. JSTOR 742829.
- Pagden, Anthony (2015). The Burdens of Empire: 1539 to the Present. Cambridge University Press. doi:10.1017/CBO9780511979200. ISBN 978-0-511-97920-0.
