= Serafina (restaurant) =

Italian restaurant in Seattle, Washington, U.S.

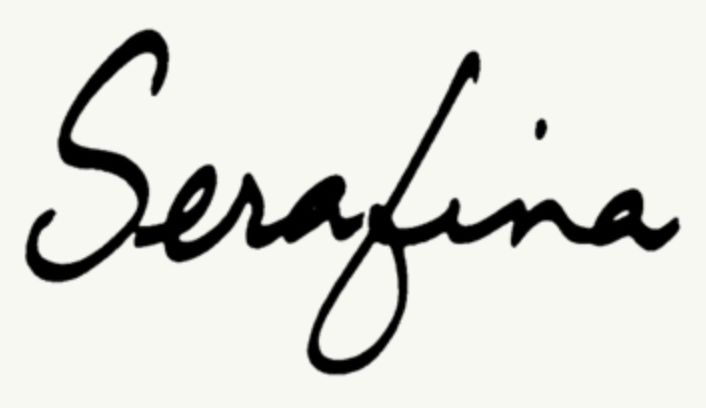

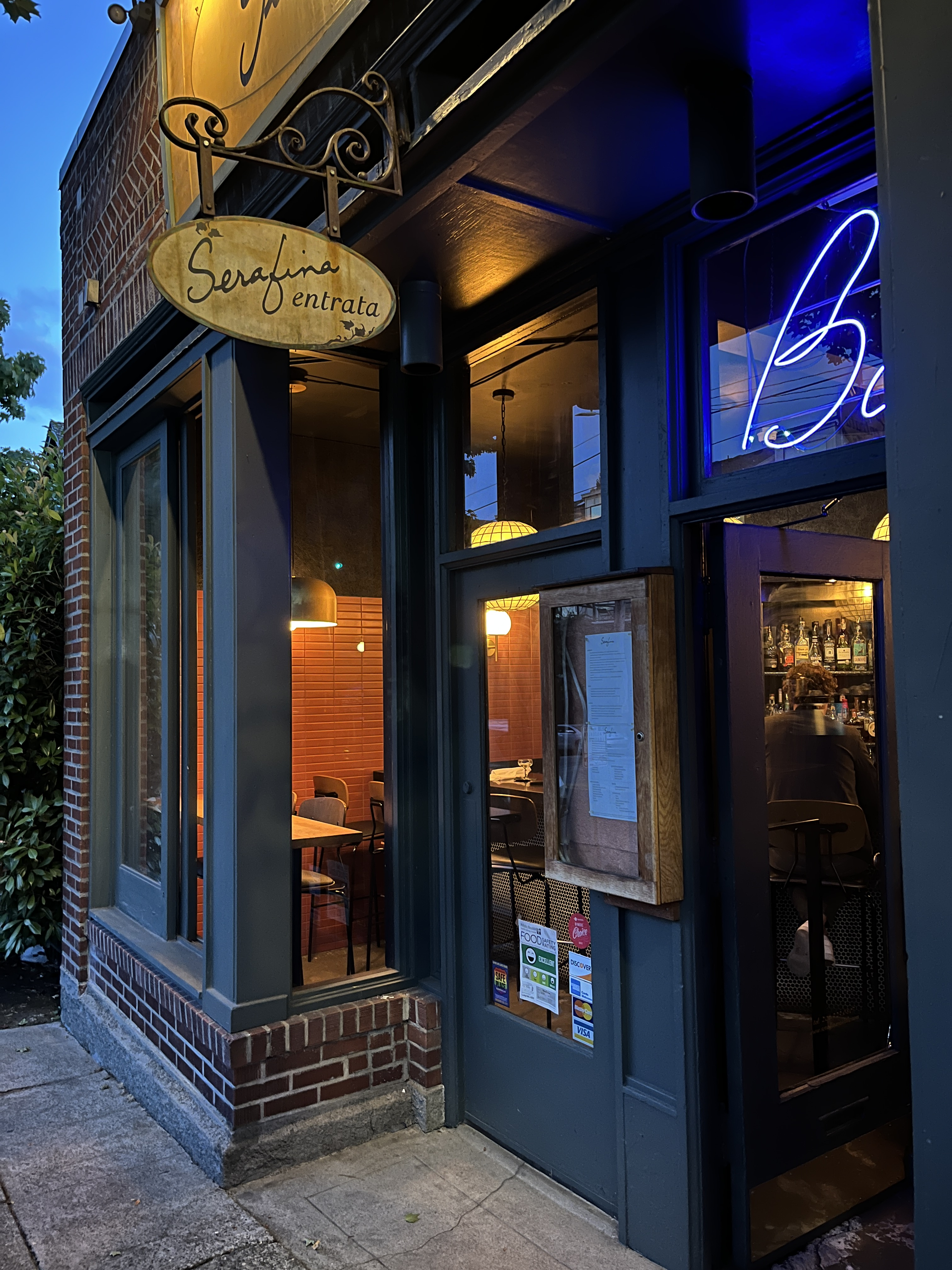
- The restaurant's exterior, 2023
- Interactive map of Serafina

Restaurant information
- Established: 1991
- Food type: Italian
- Location: 2043 Eastlake Avenue East, Seattle, King, Washington, 98102, United States
- Coordinates: 47°38′17″N 122°19′34″W
- Website: serafinaseattle.com

Serafina is an Italian restaurant in Seattle, in the U.S. state of Washington. Susan Kaufman opened the restaurant in 1991; chefs have included Dylan Giordan and Christian Chandler.

== Description ==
The 85-seat Italian restaurant Serafina is located on Eastlake Avenue East, on the east side of Lake Union. The menu has included seafood such as fish soup, pastas, eggplant rolls, gnocchi with wild mushroom sauce, sandwiches, tiramisu, and olive oil cake with cherry mascarpone. The restaurant has offered live jazz on weekends and wine tastings monthly. Serafina also has a deck which connects to sibling Mediterranean restaurant Cicchetti.

== History ==
Owner Susan Kaufman founded Serafina in 1991. She died in 2016.

Dylan Giordan was credited as a chef in 2010. Christian Chandler was executive chef, as of 2013.

Serafina has hosted an annual Garden Party Extravaganza, and brunch for Mother's Day. Like many restaurants, Serafina closed temporarily at the start of the COVID-19 pandemic and later operated via take-out.

== Reception ==
In 2016, Kathryn Robinson of Seattle Metropolitan wrote, "When Serafina opened its doors on Eastlake Avenue in 1991, it was the most exuberantly sexy Italian restaurant in a city then full of Italian restaurants." Allecia Vermillion included the business in the magazine's 2023 overview of Seattle's best Italian food. In 2019, Megan Hill included Serafina in Eater Seattle's 2019 list of "classic restaurants every Seattleite must try". Emma Banks and Bradley Foster included Serafina in Thrillist's 2022 list of the city's 14 best Italian establishments.

== See also ==
- List of Italian restaurants
