= Daniela di Serafino =

Italian applied mathematician (1966–2022)

Daniela di Serafino (8 April 1966 – 22 August 2022) was an Italian applied mathematician and numerical analyst whose research involved numerical linear algebra, gradient descent methods for nonlinear optimization, and applications in scientific computing. She was a professor of numerical analysis in the Department of Mathematics and Applications at the University of Naples Federico II.

== Early life and education ==
Di Serafino was born in Naples on 8 April 1966. She was an undergraduate at the University of Naples Federico II, where she earned a master's degree in mathematics in 1989. After two years working as a researcher in the Centre of Research for Parallel Computing and Supercomputers of the National Research Council (Italy) in Naples, she returned to the University of Naples for doctoral study in applied mathematics and computer science, completing her Ph.D. in 1995.

== Career and later life ==
After finishing her doctorate, di Serafino worked as an assistant professor at the Università degli Studi della Campania Luigi Vanvitelli (originally the "Second University of Naples") from 1995 to 2004, and as an associate professor there from 2005 to 2018. In this time frame, she also held positions as a researcher at the Institute for High-Performance Computing and Networking of the National Research Council.

In 2014, she earned a habilitation as a professor of numerical analysis, and in 2018 she obtained a full professorship at the University of Campania. In 2020, she returned to the University of Naples Federico II as a full professor.

She died on 22 August 2022.

== Recognition ==
A 2010 paper by di Serafino with Marco D'Apuzzo and Valentina De Simone, "On mutual impact of numerical linear algebra and large-scale optimization with focus on interior point methods", received the Computational Optimization and Applications Best Paper Award.
