= Papal donation =

"Papal donation" refers to two sets of papal bulls by which Pope Nicholas V, in 1454, and Pope Alexander VI, in 1493, purported to give the Catholic monarchs of Portugal and Spain, respectively, the prerogative to explore the Americas. Alexander's bull, proclaimed on 4 May 1493, was titled Inter caetera and addressed to Ferdinand and Isabella, the Catholic Monarchs of Spain, and later Catholic monarchs of Spain. England and France opposed the papal donation. Jurists including Francisco de Vitoria and Francisco Suárez argued that the pope did not have power to award territory to sovereigns.

== Works cited ==
- Hart, Jonathan Locke (2001). Representing the New World: The English and French Uses of the Example of Spain. Palgrave Macmillan. ISBN 0-312-23070-2. OCLC 46907727.
- Hoffman, Paul E. (October 1973). "Diplomacy and the Papal Donation 1493–1585". The Americas. 30 (2): 151–183. doi:10.2307/980555. ISSN 0003-1615. JSTOR 980555. S2CID 147148012.
- McAlister, Lyle N. (1984). Spain and Portugal in the New World, 1492–1700. University of Minnesota Press. pp. 74–75. ISBN 978-0-8166-1216-1.
- Padrón, Ricardo (2004). The Spacious Word: Cartography, Literature, and Empire in Early Modern Spain. University of Chicago Press. ISBN 0-226-64433-2. OCLC 52721026.
- Pagden, Anthony (2015). The Burdens of Empire: 1539 to the Present. Cambridge University Press. doi:10.1017/CBO9780511979200. ISBN 978-0-511-97920-0.
