= Seraphim (cancelled video game) =

- Developer: Valkyrie Studios
- Designer: Brian Babendererde
- Engine: Unreal Engine
- Platform: Windows
- Release: Cancelled

Seraphim is a cancelled video game that was in development by Septerra Core developers Valkyrie Studios. It was described as a third-person action game.

== Gameplay ==
The player controls a flying character from one of three angelic clans and engages in fast‑paced air and ground combat using third‑person movement and dogfighting mechanics, completing larger mission objectives such as raiding human settlements, assassinating enemy leaders, or destroying super‑weapons while progressing through a storyline of fallen angels warring on earth. As the player advances, points earned from missions allow customization of abilities, spells, and stats based on clan strengths—Angels excelling at flight, Fey at spellcasting, and Demons at close‑range power—while unique items and shared spells expand options for building a personalized character. The game also includes multiplayer modes like Capture the Flag, King of the Hill, and Capture the Lanuth Stones, with the player able to bring a single‑player character into multiplayer battles.

== Development ==
Seraphim was in development by Valkyrie Studios, a company founded in 1998 in Palatine, Illinois. The idea for Seraphim came from Brian Babendererde, the lead designer of the project and the creator of Septerra Core. Seraphim was a game concept that Babendererde had been kicking around for a few years before it began to be developed at Valkyrie. Inspirations for Seraphim included anime works from Nirasaw (who did a series of models and comics called Creature Core) and Takayuki Takeya, who also did models.

Seraphim was targeting a 2002 release. PlayStation 2 and Xbox versions were considered.
