= Seraphin =

Seraphin may refer to:

== People ==
- Seraphin (archbishop of Esztergom) (died 1104), Hungarian prelate
- Seraphin Zselizi (died 1311), Hungarian clergyman
- Seraphin of Montegranaro (1540–1604), Italian saint
- Sanctus Seraphin (1699–c. 1758), Italian violin maker
- Kevin Séraphin (born 1989), French basketball player in the National Basketball Association

== Arts and entertainment ==
- Séraphin (film), a 1950 Canadian film by Paul Gury
- Séraphin: Heart of Stone (Séraphin: un homme et son péché), a 2002 Canadian film
- Séraphin (opera), an opera by German composer Wolfgang Rihm
- Seraphin (Xena), a minor character in the television series Xena: Warrior Princess

== See also ==
- Seraphim (disambiguation)
- Serafin (disambiguation)
- Serafina (given name)
- Serafino (disambiguation)
- Séraphine (disambiguation)
- Seraphino Antao (1937–2011), Kenyan athlete
- Serapion (disambiguation)
