= Serafim Tulikov =

Serafim Tulikov Серафим Туликов
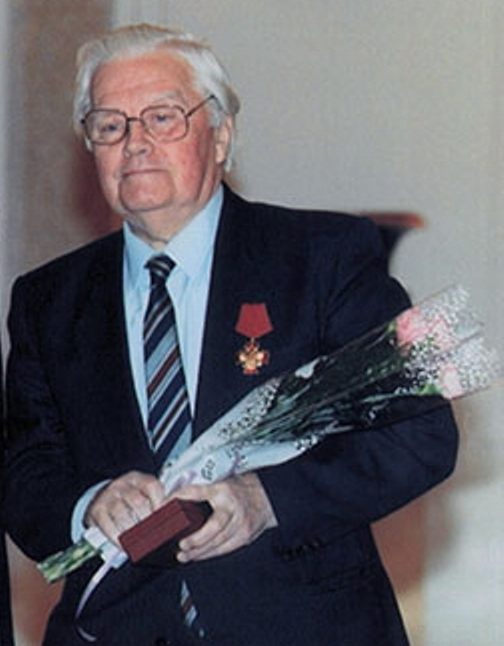
- Tulikov in 1999

Background information
- Born: Serafim Grigoryevich Boboedov; 7 July 1914; Kaluga, Russian Empire
- Died: January 29, 2004 (aged 89) Moscow, Russia
- Genres: song, instrumental works, vocal cycles, romances, operetta
- Occupations: composer, film composer, pianist
- Instrument: Piano
- Years active: 1937–2004
- Website: www.tulikov.com

Serafim Sergeyevich Tulikov (Russian: Серафи́м Серге́евич Ту́ликов; July 7, 1914 – January 29, 2004) was a Russian and Soviet composer, who was born in the Imperial Russia, and died in Russia. He was often credited as Tulikov in his musical works and his cameo appearance in Russian television series. Serafim Tulikov is known for his patriotic and officially ideological compositions.

== Early years ==
Serafim Tulikov was born in Kaluga, western Russia, to the family of bookkeeper Grigoriy Boboedov. Both parents of Serafim were active in choirs during their youth, and Serafim was deeply immersed in music during his childhood. He was eventually enrolled into the Kaluga Academy of Music, and at the age of 18, he studied at many conservatoires in Russia.

== A promising composer ==
During the mid-1940s Serafim Tulikov composed a range of melodious lyrical-patriotic songs which became quite popular, for instance, The Kursk Nightingale, with lyrics by Olga Fadeeva. The majority of these songs celebrated the return of peaceful life to war-torn Russia. Tulikov was also heavily influenced by the post-war trend in Soviet popular music towards increasingly archaic and folkloristic imagery and melodic formulas, for instance, in songs such as They Have Come for a Sojourn (lyrics by Yakov Belinsky), Moscow the Capital, and Blossom, my Homeland! (lyrics by Sergei Vasiliev).

National fame came to Tulikov in 1947, when he composed We Are for Peace, with lyrics by Aleksandr Zharov, a marching song meant to mobilize the masses all over the world on behalf of the USSR-led effort to prevent the escalation of international tensions during the early phase of the Cold War. In 1951, Tulikov composed March of the Soviet Youth (lyrics by Yevgeniy Dolmatovsky) which received the First Prize at the 3rd World Festival of Youth and Students held in East Berlin. This march continued and developed the pattern established by the composer in "We Are for Peace!"; unbridled optimism, mass-mobilizing appeal, and sunny imagery. The initial version of the "March of the Soviet Youth" contained the following words: "Our youth carry love for their Great Leader in their hearts! Stalin is leading us into the future! The path he has chosen for us is the right one!" After Nikita Khrushchev's "de-Stalinization" campaign in 1956, these words were duly replaced.

Throughout most of the 1950s, Tulikov continued to compose for all sorts of official ideological occasions, including Communist Party of the Soviet Union congresses, youth festivals, and professional conventions. Tulikov's style of optimism found its expression in such songs as This is Us, the Youth! (lyrics by Lev Oshanin), written on the occasion of the 5th World Festival of Youth and Students held in Warsaw in 1955, My Beloved Motherland (lyrics by Andrei Dostal), dedicated to the 40th Anniversary of the October Revolution in 1957. With time, Tulikov's style of mass-marching songs had undergone some substantial changes. In the beginning his marches were dynamic and energetic, strongly influenced by the mass songs of Isaak Dunayevsky, but by the late 1950s, Tulikov's marches became more solemn, more static and more hymnal, as in "My Beloved Motherland".

In his more lyrical songs of his early career, Tulikov developed his style of heartfelt and quiet melodies. Such songs include My Love, my Life (lyrics by Anton Prishelets), I Love You, My Sea (lyrics by Anatoly Salnikov), Above the Moscow River (lyrics by Lev Kondyrev), and Golden Altai (lyrics by Tsezar Solodar). The composer also made his contribution to a subgenre of the Soviet song, the army song. He authored a song dedicated to the Soviet Pacific Fleet, Above the Bleak Kuriles Range (lyrics by Nikolai Bukin), a work which combined elements of heroic devotion to the Motherland with pensiveness and longing for the far-away family and its comforts.

In reflecting on the sources of inspiration for his songs, Serafim Tulikov later confessed that it came mostly from the reminiscences of his homeland, Kaluga, and most of the elements within the songs were present in Kaluga. In the early 1960s, Tulikov would write a song dedicated to Kaluga, properly entitled The Town of My Youth (lyrics by Mikhail Plyatskovsky), a sweet and unassuming yet sincere and heartfelt song.

During Khrushchev's Virgin Lands Campaign of bringing the vast steppes of Kazakhstan and South Siberia into agricultural use, Tulikov composed another well known song, Komsomol Direction (lyrics by Tsezar Solodar), which declared: "On the go! On the go! The Komsomol direction calls us! And the merry song at the threshold sees us off forward!"

Tulikov wrote a wide variety of children's music during his lifetime. Including "School Ball". Many of his children's works were performed by the children's choir BDKh.

== Mature phase ==
Many of the older generation of Soviet composers did not feel particularly comfortable after the onset of the television age in the 1960s. Serafim Tulikov adjusted himself, and established himself as one of the leading and most popular Soviet songwriters.) His repertoire, as well as the stylistic forms he used, expanded significantly. On the one hand, Tulikov composed such near-hymnal solemn songs as "Lenin is Forever with You" (lyrics by Lev Oshanin), perhaps one of the most successful and widely known Soviet songs dedicated to Vladimir Lenin, and "Motherland" (lyrics by Yuri Polukhin). On the other hand, he wrote songs which clearly carried in themselves an imprint of the cultural thaw of the 1960s, such as "Smile!" (lyrics by Mikhail Plyatskovsky), "Equation with One Unknown" (lyrics by Mikhail Plyatskovsky), and "This will Never Be Repeated" (lyrics by Mikhail Plyatskovsky) These contained no explicit elements of ideology or patriotism, and they were decidedly divorced from the folkloristic tradition in which the majority of Tulikov's lyrical songs of the 1940s-50s were rendered.

Tulikov continued to contribute mass songs dedicated to various important events in Soviet history and politics. His song "To the Distant Planets!" (lyrics by Yuri Polukhin) was a work of optimism designed to celebrate the USSR's technological breakthroughs. Unsurprisingly, it was written in the wake of Yuri Gagarin's first space journey in 1961. In 1964, Tulikov's only opera, Barankin, bud' chelovekom, premiered in Moscow.

In the late 1960s Tulikov began to compose songs with overtly neo-Slavophile overtones. They were all dedicated to Russia, yet were different from his previous patriotic style. They became explicitly more folkloristic and filled with rural and natural imagery, such as Russia's meadows, fields, sky, lakes and rivers. The elements of wistfulness and even light sadness, as if bidding farewell to something destined to extinction, became more and more prominent. Examples of this period include "There, Far Away is my Russia" (lyrics by Vladimir Kharitonov), "Love Confession" (lyrics by Mikhail Tanich), "Treasure Russia" (lyrics by Oleg Miliavsky), "My Native Homeland" (lyrics by Peter Gradov), and "My Native Land" (lyrics by Yuri Polukhin).

Tulikov continued to write songs dedicated to the Soviet Army, its exploits and traditions, such as "Veterans' Souls Do Not Age" (lyrics by Yakov Belinsky), which became popular with the USSR leadership, itself composed of many who actively participated in the Great Patriotic War, and "The Son of Russia" (lyrics by Vladimir Kharitonov). Tulikov became notorious for composing multiple songs about Lenin and the Communist Party of the Soviet Union. For instance, an incredibly pompous and anthem-like song "I Sing of My Motherland" (lyrics by Nikolai Dorizo) was dedicated to the opening of the 26th Party Congress in 1981. The song praised the strength and the global mission of the Soviet state and pointed out that this strength was not based on fear and intimidation but rather on genuine achievements and generosity of the Soviet people.

In the early 1960s Tulikov wrote a very successful song about Moscow, "I sing of you, my Moscow" (lyrics by Yuri Polukhin). The phrase "Moscow, your fame is flying on the wings of your glory all over the world! Moscow, you are the heart of my Motherland!" became legendary. In the 1970s, Tulikov contributed several songs to the project of constructing the Baykal-Amur Mainline railway, launched by the Soviet government in 1974–75. The "BAM Waltz" (lyrics by Mikhail Pliatskovsky) became perhaps the most famous of these songs.

== Assessment ==
As the Soviet Union unravelled in the late 1980s, Serafim Tulikov found himself increasingly isolated to deal with the change. Tulikov's traditionalism, as well as his penchant for slow-flowing and sweet lyrical tunes, was sharply at odds with the newly fashionable avant-garde and radical rejection of harmony and tranquility in music, in favor of cacophony and wild rhythms. Tulikov gradually faded away from public prominence. He died in retirement in 2004. Some of his musical legacy has been resurrected by the lovers of Soviet music. However, the majority of what has been reissued and revived has been Tulikov's most non-political, light lyrical music of the 1960s-70s.
