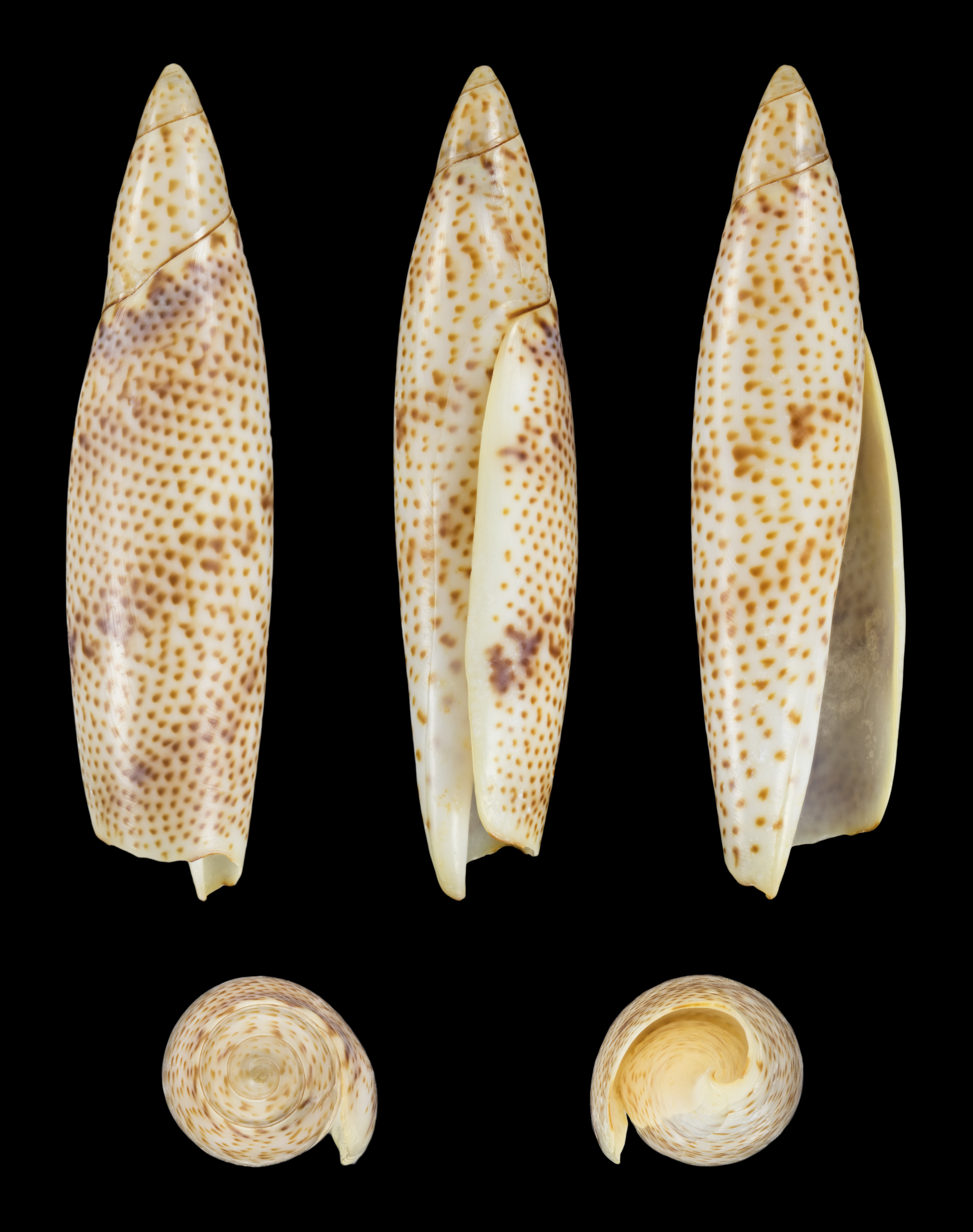
- Shell of Terebellum terebellum, a member of the family Seraphsidae

Scientific classification
- Kingdom: Animalia
- Phylum: Mollusca
- Class: Gastropoda
- Subclass: Caenogastropoda
- Order: Littorinimorpha
- Superfamily: Stromboidea
- Family: Seraphsidae; J. E. Gray, 1853

Type genus
- Seraphs Montfort, 1810

Synonyms
- Terebellidae (Homonym of Terebellidae Grube, 1850 based on Terebella Linnaeus, 1767 [Annelida]); Seraphidae (Orthographic variant, misspelling, per IRMNG, based on Seraphs [in French: Seraphe] Montfort, 1810; from Seraphina Gray, 1853 [Strombidae])

= Seraphsidae =

Seraphsidae Temporal range: Danian–Recent

Family of gastropods

Seraphsidae is a family of small to medium-sized sea snails, marine gastropod molluscs in the superfamily Stromboidea. Only one genus, Terebellum, is alive today, but several fossil genera are known, with the earliest records of the family dating back to the Danian age of the Paleocene. Seraphsids are adapted for a burrowing life, with a streamlined shell. Terebellum and its fossil relatives were originally classified as members of the closely related family Strombidae. When they were recognized as a separate family, the family was initially called Terebellidae, but as the name was already in use for a family of polychaete worms, the name Seraphsidae was proposed as a replacement, derived from the fossil genus Seraphs.

== Genera ==
There is one extant genus within the family Seraphsidae:

- Terebellum Röding, 1798

All other Seraphsidae genera are known only from the fossil record:

- †Diameza Deshayes, 1865
- †Mauryna de Gregorio, 1880
- †Miniseraphs Jung,1974
- †Paraseraphs Jung, 1974
- †Pseudoterebellum Maxwell, Rymer & Congdon, 2021
- †Seraphs Montfort, 1810

=== Synonyms for Terebellum ===
- Artopoia Gistel, 1848: synonym of Terebellum Bruguière, 1798 (invalid: unnecessary substitute name for Terebellum)
- Lucis Gistel, 1848: synonym of Terebellum Bruguière, 1798
- Terebrina Rafinesque, 1815: synonym of Terebellum Bruguière, 1798
