= Staka Skenderova =

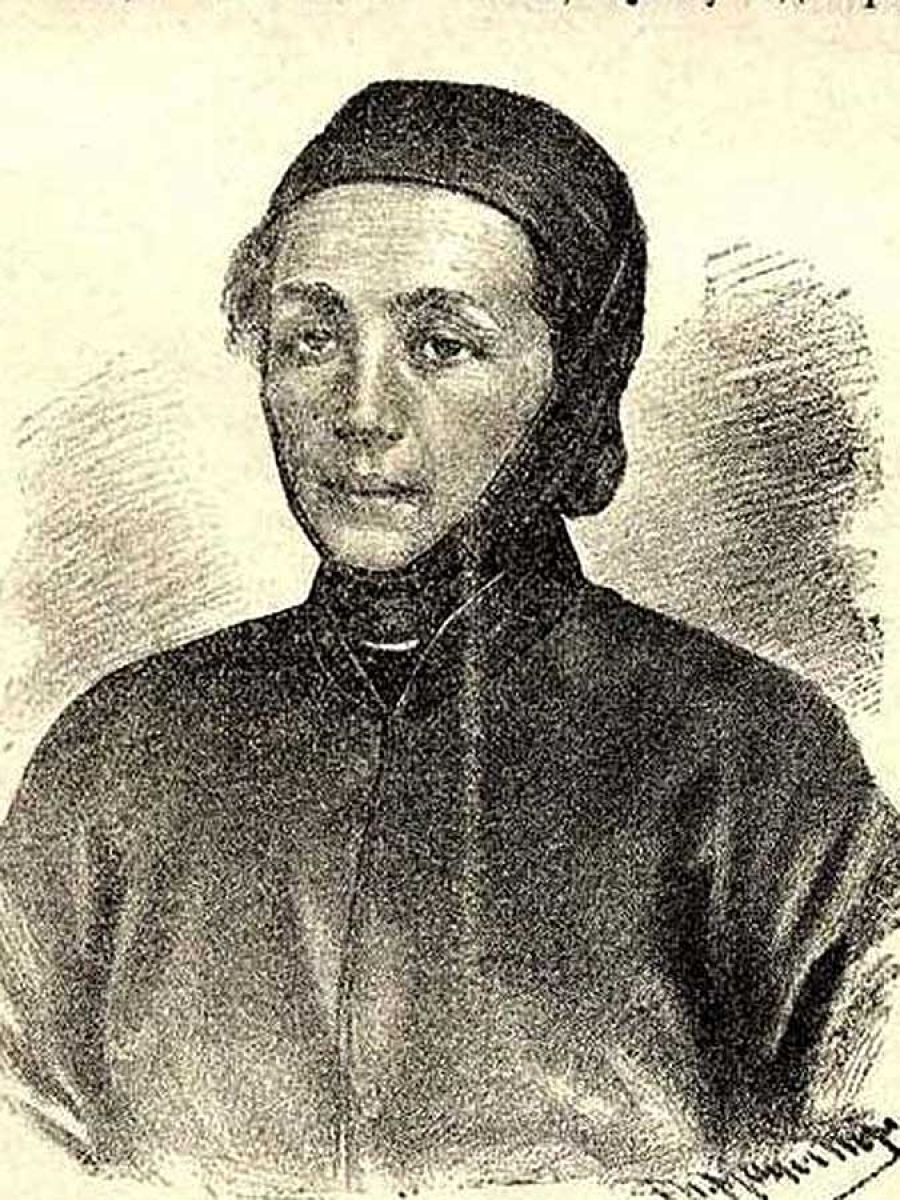
- Born: 1828; Sarajevo, Ottoman Empire
- Died: 26 May 1891 (aged 63); Sarajevo, Bosnia and Herzegovina, Austria-Hungary
- Resting place: Holy Archangels Cemetery, Sarajevo

Staka Skenderova (1828 – 26 May 1891) was a Serb teacher, social worker, writer and folklorist from Bosnia and Herzegovina. She is credited with establishing Sarajevo's first school for girls on 19 October 1858. The following year, she became the first published woman author in modern Bosnia.

== Life ==
Skenderova was born in 1831 in Sarajevo to parents from Prijepolje in Sandžak. Her older brother sewed for the Ottoman Army, and Skenderova learned the Turkish language at a young age and taught herself to write.

Skenderova, by permission of the Ottoman authorities, was allowed to open the first school for girls in Sarajevo in 1858. She was also the first woman teacher in Bosnia and Hercegovina.

She eventually decided to become a nun. Since Bosnia at the time had no Serbian Orthodox female monastery, she was ordained as an Eastern Orthodox nun in Jerusalem in 1870.

== Death ==
Skenderova died in May 1891. While she was enjoying some entertainment in Ilidža, a horse-drawn carriage ploughed into the crowd and Skenderova was severely wounded. She was cared for by a friend, Paulina Irby, but died of her injuries soon after. Irby arranged the funeral and Skenderova was buried in Sarajevo.

Skenderova was featured in the multi-media ŽeneBiH project, devised by activists and scholars in Bosnia to highlight the achievements of women in the country's culture and history. She is also one of the principal subjects of the essay collection No Man's Lands: eight extraordinary women in Balkan history, by the British-Kosovan writers Elizabeth Gowing and Robert Wilton.

== Works ==
- Ljetopis Bosne, 1825–1856 ("The Bosnian Chronicle, 1825–1856", 1859)
