= Jean Sérafin =

French footballer and coach (born 1941)

Personal information
- Date of birth: 24 June 1941 (age 85)
- Place of birth: Auzat, France
- Position: Defender

Senior career*
| Years | Team | Apps | (Gls) |
| 1961–1971 | Valenciennes | | |
| 1971–1973 | Dunkerque | | |

Managerial career
- 1973–1974: Le Touquet AC
- 1976–1979: Le Touquet AC
- 1981–1982: Lens
- 1982–1987: Nice
- 1987–1988: Nîmes
- 1988–1992: Tours
- 1992–1994: Al-Wahda FC
- 1995–1997: Club Africain
- 1997–1998: Red Star
- 2000–2001: Wuhan
- 2002–2004: RC Grasse
- 2004–2007: Mandelieu-la-Napoule
- * Club domestic league appearances and goals

Jean Sérafin (born 24 June 1941) is a French former footballer and coach.

He played for US Valenciennes and USL Dunkerque.

After his playing career, he became a coach with Le Touquet AC, RC Lens, OGC Nice, Nîmes Olympique, Tours FC, Al-Wahda FC, Club Africain, Red Star and Wuhan.
