= Seraphin of Montegranaro =

Italian Capuchin and saint

Saint Seraphin of Montegranaro OFMCap
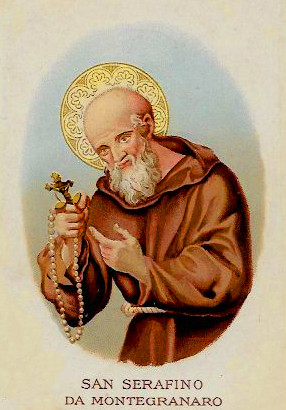
- Born: 1540; Montegranaro
- Died: 12 October 1604; Ascoli Piceno
- Venerated in: Roman Catholic Church
- Beatified: 18 July 1729, Saint Peter's Basilica, Papal States by Pope Benedict XIII
- Canonized: 16 July 1767, Saint Peter's Basilica, Papal States by Pope Clement XIII
- Feast: 12 October
- Attributes: Franciscan habit

Seraphin of Montegranaro (Italian: Serafino da Montegranaro; 1540 – 12 October 1604), was an Italian Capuchin lay brother, who is honoured as a saint by the Catholic Church.

== Life ==
Born Felix Rapagnano (also written Felice) in Montegranaro, then in the March of Fermo, he was the second of four children of poor but pious parents, Gerolamo Rapagnano and Teodora Giovannuzzi. His father was a mason. Because of their poverty, the family depended on the productivity of all of its members. The eldest son, Silenzio, followed in his father's footsteps as a mason. The slighter and less manually adept Felix was hired out to a local farmer as a shepherd. Felix enjoyed shepherding since it afforded him time for prayer. Even at an early age, he had an inclination toward silence, seclusion, and prayer.

When their father died, however, he was summoned home. His brother understood that Felix lacked the skills of a mason, but hoped to use him as an unskilled labourer. All attempts proved futile. Felix could not even learn how to slake lime. He did learn, however, to put up with the physical and emotional abuse heaped upon him by his irascible brother.

Felix kept in mind stories he had heard about the desert ascetics and of their fasting and penances, and dreamed of becoming like them. He confided in a friend, Luisa Vannucci from Loro Piceno, who encouraged him to enter religious life. She specifically mentioned the Capuchins because she was familiar with these friars and with their reputation for virtue. Immediately, he left for Tolentino and presented himself to the Capuchin minister provincial, expecting to be admitted that very day. But such was not the Capuchin custom. Instead, he was sent home, in all likelihood because of his age and fragile condition. In 1556, he repeated his request to the minister provincial, who this time accepted him and sent him to the novitiate of the province at Jesi.

After he completed a year of probation, Felix received the religious name Seraphin (or in Italian, Serafino, meaning "seraph"). Seraphin was distinguished from the first by his unaffected simplicity, mortification, and obedience as well as a great charity towards the poor.

He had a special devotion to the Blessed Sacrament and to the Blessed Virgin. He was assigned to serve variously as a porter or questor at various friaries throughout the March, but most of his religious life was spent at Ascoli Piceno. A Capuchin custom was to keep rooms near the porter's office available for the use of travellers and pilgrims. At whatever hour of the night, Seraphin would answer the door. Many recounted that, after the city gates had been closed for the night, they had sought refuge at the Capuchin friary, which was usually located outside the city walls, and that they had been welcomed warmly by Seraphin. He spent entire nights in church. Friars testified that, after everyone else had gone to bed, they would often hear him walking toward the church to spend the night in adoration before the Blessed Sacrament. There he was heard praying, "Peace, Lord, I ask peace for so-and-so."

Seraphin died at Ascoli Piceno in the early afternoon of 12 October 1604.

== Miracles and reputation ==
Seraphin's physical appearance was described as that of a peasant: hair always rumpled, clumsy at manual tasks, and mainly illiterate. But his holiness was recognized by many. At times, he was discouraged by the ridicule of his Capuchin brothers. Seraphin would regain his composure and perspective through prayer. He explained, "When I entered religious life I was a poor, unskilled laborer, lacking both talent and potential. I remained as I was, and this caused so many humiliations and rebukes which the devil used as opportunities to tempt me to leave religious life and retreat to some desert, withdrawing into myself. I entrusted myself to the Lord, and one night I heard a voice coming from the tabernacle say, 'To serve God you must die to yourself and accept adversity, of whatever type.' So I accepted them and resolved to recite a rosary for anyone who caused me trouble. Then I heard the voice from the tabernacle say, 'Your prayers for those who mortify you are very pleasing to me. In exchange, I am ready to grant you many graces.'"

Recollections sustain that Seraphin was endowed with the gift of reading the secrets of hearts, and with that of miracles and prophecy. Although unlettered, Seraphin's advice was sought by secular and ecclesiastical dignitaries. His reputation reached as far as the Dukes of Bavaria and Parma, the Peopli nobles of Bologna, and Cardinal Ottavio Bandini. The bishop of Ascoli, the eminent theologian Cardinal Girolamo Bernerio, also sought out his advice.

Seraphin was austere in his person. Only once in his life did he accept a new religious habit, and then, only out of obedience. For forty continuous years, he ate only soup or salad. In keeping with the spirituality prevalent at the time, Seraphin had a personal devotion of serving as many Masses as possible. To avoid having people kiss his hand or tunic to show their respect, Seraphin would carry a crucifix with him, offering it for them to kiss instead.

However, Seraphin also possessed a great sense of humour. Once, a woman asked him if she would give birth to a boy or a girl. He attempted to avoid answering. But the woman insisted, saying, "How shall I know what name to choose?" Chuckling, Seraphin responded, "As far as that goes, choose Ursula and Companions," indicating that throughout her life the woman would give birth to a succession of girls.

== Veneration ==
Even before Seraphin's burial in 1604, his first biographer put pen to paper. He was canonized by Pope Clement XIII on 16 July 1767. Pope Clement canonized Seraphin, together with John Cantius, Joseph Calasanz, Joseph of Cupertino, Jerome Emiliani and Jane Frances de Chantal. In the papal bull of canonization, the illiterate and physically clumsy Capuchin was acclaimed as a person who "knew how to read and understand the great book of life which is our Saviour, Jesus Christ. For that reason, he deserves to be listed among Christ's principal disciples."

Serafin's feast day is celebrated on 12 October. His tomb is in the Capuchin friary at Ascoli Piceno.
