= 20s =

Third decade of the first century AD

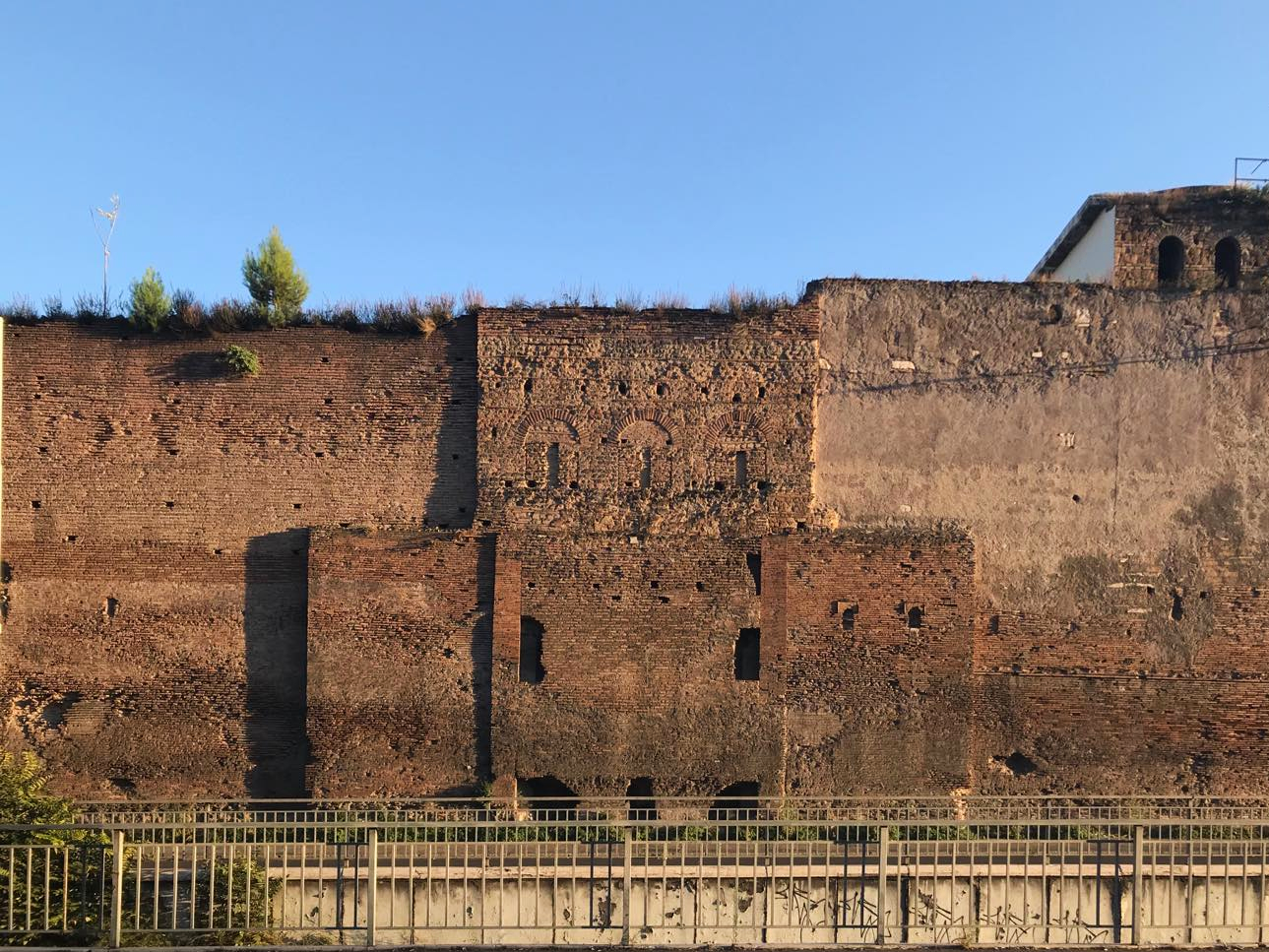
Remains of the Castra Praetoria, built in 23 AD by Lucius Aelius Sejanus

The 20s decade ran from January 1, AD 20, to December 31, AD 29.

In Europe, the 20s saw revolts by the Aedui, Thracian tribesmen, and the Frisians against the Roman Empire. In North Africa, Tacfarinas, a Numidian Berber deserter, led the Musulamii tribe and a loose and changing coalition of other Berber tribes in revolt, before being defeated in AD 24. In China, the Xin dynasty collapsed and the Eastern Han dynasty was established. In Korea, Daemusin of Goguryeo annexed Dongbuyeo and killed its king Daeso.

In science, the 20s saw the manufacture of pens and metal writing tools in Rome. Major disasters of this decade include a fire in Rome, and the collapse of a poorly built amphitheatre in Fidenae, which killed 20,000 of the 50,000 spectators. In 27, Christianity originates from Judaea as a Jewish Christian sect of the Second Temple Judaism. Geographica, an encyclopedia of geographical knowledge created by Strabo, was finished no later than AD 23.

Manning (2008) tentatively estimates the world population in AD 20 as 246 million.

== Demographics ==
Due to lack of reliable demographic data, estimates of the world population in the 1st century vary wildly, with estimates for AD 1 varying from 150 to 300 million. Demographers typically do not attempt to estimate most specific years in antiquity, instead giving approximate numbers for round years such as AD 1 or AD 200. However, attempts at reconstructing the world population in more specific years have been made, with Manning (2008) tentatively estimating the world population in AD 20 as 246 million.

== Events ==
=== 20 AD ===
==== Roman Empire ====
- Galba, the future emperor, is a Roman praetor.
- Emperor Tiberius is forced to order an investigation and a public trial in the Roman Senate, for the murder of Germanicus. Fearing he will be found guilty, Gnaeus Calpurnius Piso commits suicide.

=== 21 AD ===
==== Roman Empire ====
- The Aedui revolt under Julius Florus and Julius Sacrovir; the revolt is suppressed by Gaius Silius.
- Emperor Tiberius is a Roman Consul for the fourth time.
- The Romans create a buffer state in the territory of the Quadi, in southern Slovakia.
- Barracks are constructed for the Praetorian Guard, on the Quirinal (located on the Seven Hills of Rome).
- The manufacture of pens and metal writing tools begins in Rome (approximate date).

==== Korea ====
- King Daeso of Dongbuyeo is killed in battle against the armies of Goguryeo, led by its third ruler, King Daemusin.

=== 22 AD ===
==== Roman Empire ====
- Drusus Julius Caesar receives the tribunicia potestas (tribunician power).

=== 23 AD ===
==== Roman Empire ====
- Greek geographer Strabo publishes Geographica, a work covering the world known to the Romans and Greeks at the time of Emperor Augustus – it is the only such book to survive from the ancient world.
- Emperor Tiberius' son Drusus Julius Caesar dies. From that point forward, Tiberius seems to lose interest in the Empire and occupies himself with the pursuit of pleasure.
- Lucius Aelius Sejanus begins to dominate the Roman Senate and Tiberius, after the death of Drusus.

==== China ====
- Liu Xuan, a descendant of the Han dynasty royal family and leader of insurgents against the Xin dynasty, proclaims himself emperor against Wang Mang.
- July – After being under siege for two months, about 19,000 insurgents under Liu Xiu defeat 450,000 of Wang Mang's troops in the Battle of Kunyang, ushering in the fall of Wang Mang's Xin dynasty and restoration of the Han dynasty.
- October 6 – Emperor Liu Xuan's forces kill Wang Mang at the end of a three-day siege.

=== 24 AD ===
==== Roman Empire ====
- June 30 – The terms of Servius Cornelius Cethegus and Lucius Visellius Varro as Roman consuls expire. During their terms, two laws pertaining to slavery had been passed, the lex Visellia de iure Quiritium Latinorum qui inter vigiles militaverant granting freed slaves Roman citizenship after six years service, and the Lex Visellia de poenis libertinorum qui ingenuorum honores usurpabant which penalized non-citizens who falsely claimed to be ingenui or freeborn Romans.
- July 1 – Midway through the Roman year 777 A.U.C., Gaius Calpurnius Aviola and Publius Lentulus Scipio begin the new consular year as the new suffect consuls.
- The Roman war against Numidia and Mauretania ends with the annexation of the two African kingdoms.
- The revolt of Tacfarinas revolt in Africa is repressed.
- The Senate expels actors from Rome.

==== Korea ====
- In the Kingdom of Silla, which compromises most of the eastern Korean Peninsula, Yuri of the House of Park becomes the new monarch (the chachaung). King Yuri takes the throne at the capital, Seorabeo (now Gyeongju in South Korea) upon the death of his father, King Namhae.
- King Yuri ascends to the throne as ruler of Silla (Korea).

==== North Africa ====
- The Masinissa line of the rulers of Carthage ends.

=== 25 AD ===
==== Roman Empire ====
- Emperor Tiberius settles a dispute between Messenia and Sparta over the Ager Dentheliales on Mount Taygetus, awarding the land to Messenia.
- Lucius Aelius Sejanus unsuccessfully attempts to marry Livilla.

==== China ====
- August 5 – The Han dynasty is restored in China as Liu Xiu proclaims himself Emperor Guangwu of Han, starting the Jianwu era (until AD 56).
- November 27 – Luoyang becomes the capital of the Houhan or Eastern Han dynasty.

=== 26 AD ===
==== Roman Empire ====
- Emperor Tiberius retires to Capri, leaving the Praetorian Guard under Lucius Aelius Sejanus in charge of the Roman Empire and the city of Rome.
- Romans crush an uprising of Thracian tribesmen.

==== Palestine ====
- Pontius Pilate is appointed as prefect of the Roman imperial province of Judea.
- Jesus is baptized in the Jordan River by John the Baptist and begins his public ministry, according to some scholars.

==== Han dynasty ====
- Xinlun is presented by author Huan Tan to Emperor Guangwu of Han with its final chapter (on zither music) still unfinished.

=== 27 AD ===
==== Roman Empire ====
- A fire breaks out in Rome.
- A poorly built amphitheatre in Fidenae collapses, killing 20,000 of the 50,000 spectators.
- An Arc of Triumph is erected in Rimini, in honor of the former Emperor Augustus.

==== Palestine ====
- Using the dates and ranges listed in the Gospel of Luke, this year can be established as when John the Baptist begins preaching. It is also argued that Jesus was baptised by John in the final months of this year before his temptation and the first of three Passovers listed in the Gospel of John (another possibility is AD 29).

=== 28 AD ===
==== Germania ====
- Roman legions in Germania are transported by fleet to the fortress of Flevum on the Rhine, to operate against the rebellious Frisians.
- The Frisians negotiate a treaty with the Roman Empire at the River Rhine.
- Frisians revolt against Roman authorities, hanging tax collectors and besieging a local fort. Frisians achieve victory and gain considerable prestige among other local tribes.

==== Korea ====
- King Daru of Baekje succeeds to the throne of Baekje in the Korean Peninsula.

=== 29 AD ===
==== Roman Empire ====
- Agrippina the Elder is exiled to the island of Pandataria, and her sons (except Caligula) are imprisoned by Lucius Aelius Sejanus.
- Aulus Plautius, later military leader of the invasion of Britain under Emperor Claudius, becomes suffect consul alongside Lucius Nonius Asprenas.

==== Palestine ====
- According to the Gospel of Luke (Luke 3:1-2), the ministries of John the Baptist and Jesus is thought to have started this year.
- Jesus is executed by crucifixion, according to Roman Catholic tradition and Tertullian's chronology.

== Births ==
=== 22 AD ===
- Valeria Messalina, third wife of Emperor Claudius (d. 48 AD)

=== 23 AD ===
- Pliny the Elder, Roman scientist and writer (d. 79 AD)

=== 25 AD ===
- Gaius Julius Civilis, Batavian military leader
- Quintus Volusius Saturninus, Roman consul

=== 27 AD ===
- Herod Agrippa II, king of Judea
- Petronius, Roman writer and suffect consul (d. AD 66)
- Wang Chong, Chinese astronomer and philosopher (d. AD 100)

=== 28 AD ===
- June 15 – Ming of Han, Chinese emperor (d. AD 75)
- Julia Berenice, Jewish client queen of the Roman imperial province of Judea
- Silius Italicus, Roman consul and epic poet

== Deaths ==
=== 20 AD ===
- Gnaeus Calpurnius Piso, Roman statesman and governor of Syria (b. 44 BC)
- Vipsania Agrippina, wife of Gaius Asinius Gallus and former wife of Tiberius (b. 36 BC)
- Amanitore, Nubian Queen Regnant of the Kushitic Kingdom of Meroë

=== 21 AD ===
- Arminius, Germanic military leader (b. 18/17 BC)
- Clutorius Priscus, Roman poet (b. c. 20 BC)
- Daeso of Dongbuyeo, Korean king (b. 60 BC)
- Marcus Valerius Messalla Barbatus, Roman consul (b. 11 BC)
- Publius Sulpicius Quirinius, Roman governor (b. c. 51 BC)
- Wang (or Xiaomu), Chinese empress of the Xin Dynasty

=== 22 AD ===
- Gaius Ateius Capito, Roman jurist and suffect consul (b. c. 30 BC)
- Junia Tertia, wife of Gaius Cassius Longinus (b. c. 75 BC)

=== 23 AD ===
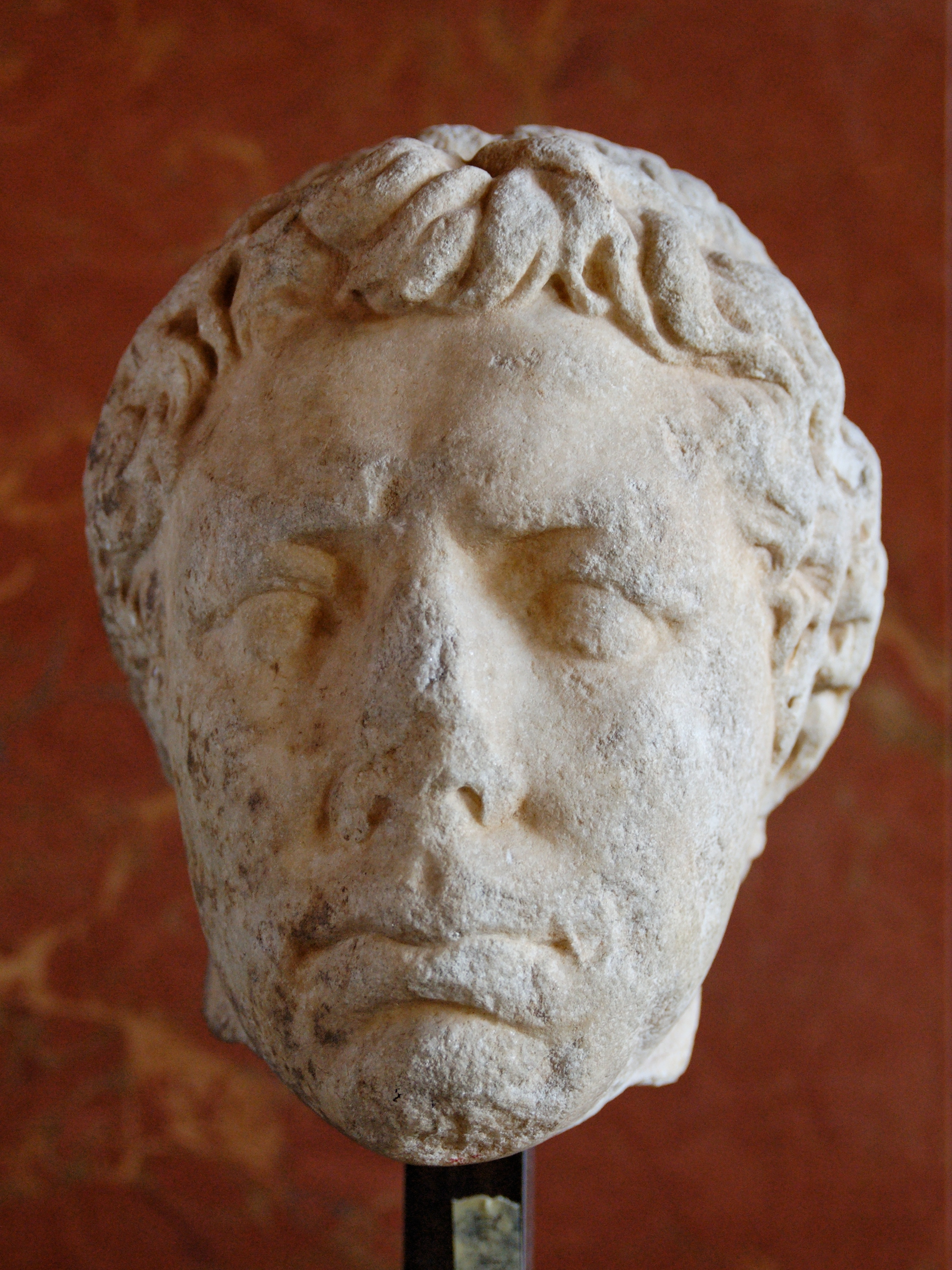
Portrait of King Juba II (48 BC–AD 23)

- September 14 – Drusus Julius Caesar, son of Emperor Tiberius (b. 14 BC)
- October 6 – Wang Mang, Chinese emperor of the Xin dynasty (b. c. 45 BC)
- Juba II, king of Mauretania (b. c. 50 BC)
- Liu Xin, Chinese astronomer, mathematician and politician (b. c. 50 BC)
- Liu Yan, Chinese general and politician
- Servius Cornelius Lentulus Maluginensis, Roman statesman
- Wang, Chinese empress of the Xin dynasty (b. 8 BC)

=== 24 AD ===
- Gaius Silius, Roman general and consul
- Lucius Calpurnius Piso, Roman consul
- Namhae, king of Silla
- Strabo, Greek geographer and historian
- Tacfarinas, Numidian military leader
- Wang Lang, Chinese emperor

=== 25 AD ===
- Aulus Cremutius Cordus, Roman historian and writer
- Gengshi, Chinese emperor of the Han dynasty
- Gnaeus Cornelius Lentulus, Roman consul (b. 54 BC)
- Lucius Antonius, grandson of Mark Antony (b. 20 BC)
- Lucius Domitius Ahenobarbus, Roman consul (b. 49 BC)
- Ruzi Ying, Chinese emperor of the Western Han (b. AD 5)

=== 26 AD ===
- Claudia Pulchra, cousin and close friend to Agrippina the Elder (b. 14 BC)
- Marcus Asinius Agrippa, Roman consul
- Quintus Haterius, Roman politician
- Sun Deng, Chinese puppet emperor

=== 27 AD ===
- Publius Quinctilius Varus the Younger, Roman nobleman (b. AD 4)

=== 28 AD ===
- Onjo of Baekje, Korean king

=== 29 AD ===
- Gaius Fufius Geminus, Roman plebeian tribune and consul
- Julia the Younger, granddaughter of Augustus (b. 19 BC)
- Livia, wife of Augustus and mother of Tiberius (b. 58 BC)
- Jesus (debatable) (b. 5 BC)
