= Asinius =

Asinius is the nomen of the plebeian Asinia gens of ancient Rome. Local tradition holds that the Italian town of Assignano derives its name from the gens, as well as the French town of Assignan.

- Gaius Asinius Pollio, orator, poet, historian, consul 40 BC
- Gaius Asinius Gallus Saloninus, consul 8 BC, died 30, father of Asinius Celer
- Gaius Asinius Pollio, consul 23
- Marcus Asinius Agrippa, consul 25
- Marcus Asinius Marcellus, consul 54
- Marcus Asinius Pollio Verrucosus, consul 81
- Marcus Asinius Atratinus, consul 89
- Gaius Asinius Frugi, monet. of Phrygia between 98 and 116
- Marcus Asinius Marcellus, the Younger, consul 104, son of Marcus Asinius Marcellus
- Gaius Asinius Rufus, notable in Lydia 134/135, senator 136
- Gaius Asinius Protimus Quadratus, proconsul of Achaea ca. 211 or 220 – son of the above
- Gaius Asinius Quadratus, historian of 3rd century – who may be identical with Gaius Asinius Quadratus Protimus
- Gaius Asinius Lepidus Praetextatus, consul of AD 242.

== Others ==
There were several others with this name that were not part of the Asinia gens:

- Herius Asinius, Celtic commander of the 1st century BCE
