= Asinia gens =

Ancient Roman family

The gens Asinia was a plebeian family at ancient Rome, which rose to prominence during the first century BC. The first member of this gens mentioned in history is Herius Asinius, commander of the Marrucini during the Social War. The Asinii probably obtained Roman citizenship in the aftermath of this conflict, as they are mentioned at Rome within a generation, and Gaius Asinius Pollio obtained the consulship in 40 BC.

== Origin ==
The Asinii came from Teate, the chief town of the Marrucini, an Oscan-speaking people related to the Samnites. Silius Italicus mentions a certain Herius who lived around the beginning of the Second Punic War, who was said to have been an ancestor of the Asinii. The nomen Asinius is derived from the cognomen Asina, a she-ass, one of a large class of surnames derived from familiar objects and animals. A related but more familiar name was Asellus, borne as a cognomen by the Cornelii and Claudii.

== Praenomina ==
The main praenomina of the Asinii at Rome were Gaius and Gnaeus, to which they sometimes added other names, including Marcus, Lucius, Servius, and Quintus. The earliest of the Asinii bore the Oscan praenomen Herius, which was apparently of long standing amongst their ancestors.

== Branches and cognomina ==
There were two main families of the Asinii at Rome. The earlier of these bore the cognomen Pollio, a surname originally designating a polisher of armour. The sons of Gaius Asinius Pollio, consul in 40 BC, each bore different surnames, including Pollio, Agrippa, Saloninus, Celer, and Gallus, some of which were passed on to their descendants. The Asinii Marcelli were descended from Marcus Asinius Agrippa.

Of these names, Agrippa was an old praenomen that came to be a common surname in the later Republic and under the Empire. Saloninus was derived from the Salonia gens, an ancient but undistinguished family from which this branch of the Asinii may have been descended. Celer, swift, belongs to a large class of surnames describing an individual's habits or physical characteristics. Gallus, a cockerel, is the same type of cognomen as Asina.

The other stirps of the Asinii, with the cognomen Rufus, originally indicating someone with red hair, appears in imperial times, and may well have been related to the Polliones. As with that family, the Asinii Rufi also bore a variety of other surnames, including Bassus, stout, and Quadratus, stocky, as well as names inherited from other gentes, such as Frugi, an agnomen of the Calpurnii, and Nicomachus, a surname of Greek origin.

Other surnames of the Asinii include Dento, indicating someone with prominent teeth, Lepidus, agreeable, and Praetextatus, probably a reference to the toga praetexta, a purple-bordered toga worn by magistrates and Roman youths. Lepidus might allude to the bearer's descent from the Aemilii Lepidi, an illustrious family of the Republic. It is unclear how these Asinii might have been related to the two main families of the gens, as is the case with those Asinii who are mentioned without any surnames.

== Members ==
This list includes abbreviated praenomina. For an explanation of this practice, see filiation.

=== Asinii Polliones, Galli, et Marcelli ===
- Herius Asinius, commander of the Marrucini during the Marsic War, and perhaps the grandfather of Gaius Asinius Pollio.
- Gnaeus Asinius, only known as the father of Gaius Asinius Pollio.
- Gaius Asinius Cn. f. Pollio, a distinguished orator, poet and historian of the Augustan age, consul in 40 BC.
- Asinius Cn. f. Marrucinus, known for his practical jokes.
- Asinia C. f. Cn. n., wife of Marcus Claudius Marcellus Aeserninus.
- Asinius Pollio, a sophist and philosopher, who succeeded Timagenes in his school.
- Lucius Asinius Gallus, celebrated a triumph in 26 BC.
- Gaius Asinius C. f. Cn. n. Gallus Saloninus, consul in 8 BC, and second husband of Vipsania Agrippina.
- Gaius Asinius C. f. C. n. Pollio, consul in AD 23.
- Marcus Asinius C. f. C. n. Agrippa, consul in AD 25.
- Gnaeus Asinius C. f. C. n. Saloninus.
- Servius Asinius C. f. C. n. Celer, consul suffectus in AD 38, apparently put to death by the emperor Claudius.
- Asinia Agrippina Ser. f. C. n.
- Lucius Asinius C. f. C. n. Gallus, exiled for conspiring against Claudius.
- Marcus Asinius M. f. C. n. Marcellus, son of Marcus Asinius Agrippa, consul in AD 54.
- Lucius Asinius Gallus, consul in AD 62.
- Asinius Pollio, the commander of a regiment of horse, serving under Lucceius Albinus in Mauretania, was slain in AD 69, when the troops espoused the side of Vitellius.
- Lucius Asinius Pollio Verrucosus, consul in AD 81.
- Quintus Asinius Marcellus, consul suffectus in an uncertain year after AD 97.
- Marcus Asinius M. f. M. n. Marcellus, consul in AD 104.

=== Asinii Rufi et Quadrati ===
- Asinius Rufus, a friend of Tacitus and the younger Pliny, the latter of whom recommends Asinius Bassus, the son of Rufus, to Fundanus.
- Asinius Bassus, son of Asinius Rufus, recommended to Fundanus by Gaius Plinius Secundus.
- Gaius Asinius Frugi, triumvir monetalis in Phrygia between AD 98 and 116.
- Gaius Asinius Rufus, perhaps the son of Gaius Asinius Frugi, became a senator in AD 136.
- Gaius Asinius C. f. Nichomachus, b. circa AD 135.
- Gaius Asinius Protimus Quadratus, proconsul of Achaea circa AD 211, and consul designate.
- Gaius Asinius Rufus, brother of the proconsul Quadratus.
- Gaius Asinius Nicomachus Julianus, proconsul of Asia circa AD 220.
- Gaius Asinius C. f. C. n. Julius Quadratus.
- Gaius Asinius Quadratus, a historian of the third century. He may be the same person as the proconsul Protimus Quadratus.

=== Others ===
- Asinius Dento, a person whom Cicero calls nobilis sui generis, was a centurion primus pilus under Marcus Calpurnius Bibulus in 51 BC, and was killed near Mount Amanus.
- Asinius, a friend of Marcus Antonius, who surreptitiously crept into the senate after the death of Caesar, 44 BC.
- Marcus Asinius Atratinus, consul in AD 89.
- Gaius Asinius Lepidus Praetextatus, consul in AD 242.

== See also ==
- List of Roman gentes

== Bibliography ==
- Marcus Tullius Cicero, Epistulae ad Atticum, Philippicae.
- Gaius Valerius Catullus Carmina.
- Titus Livius (Livy), History of Rome.
- Lucius Annaeus Seneca (Seneca the Younger), Apocolocyntosis Divi Claudii (The Gourdification of the Divine Claudius).
- Gaius Plinius Secundus (Pliny the Elder), Historia Naturalis (Natural History).
- Tiberius Catius Silius Italicus, Punica.
- Gaius Plinius Caecilius Secundus (Pliny the Younger), Epistulae (Letters).
- Publius Cornelius Tacitus, Annales, Historiae.
- Gaius Suetonius Tranquillus, De Vita Caesarum (Lives of the Caesars, or The Twelve Caesars).
- Lucius Cassius Dio Cocceianus (Cassius Dio), Roman History.
- August Böckh et alii, Corpus Inscriptionum Graecarum (The Body of Greek Inscriptions, abbreviated CIG), Königliche Akademie der Wissenschaften (1828–1877).
- Dictionary of Greek and Roman Biography and Mythology, William Smith, ed., Little, Brown and Company, Boston (1849).
- August Pauly, Georg Wissowa, et alii, Realencyclopädie der Classischen Altertumswissenschaft (Scientific Encyclopedia of the Knowledge of Classical Antiquities, abbreviated RE or PW), J. B. Metzler, Stuttgart (1894–1980).
- Paul M. M. Leunissen, Konsuln und Konsulare in der Zeit von Commodus bis Severus Alexander, J.C. Gieben, Amsterdam (1989).
