= Servius =

Servius may refer to:

- Servius (praenomen), a personal name during the Roman Republic
- Servius the Grammarian (fl. 4th/5th century), Roman Latin grammarian
- Servius Asinius Celer (died AD 46), Roman senator
- Servius Cornelius Cethegus, Roman senator 24 AD
- Servius Cornelius Dolabella Metilianus Pompeius Marcellus, Roman senator and patrician, consul 113 AD
- Servius Cornelius Dolabella Petronianus, Roman senator, consul 86 AD
- Servius Cornelius Lentulus Maluginensis (died AD 23), Roman statesman, consul 10 AD
- Servius Cornelius Maluginensis, Roman senator, consul 485 BC
- Servius Cornelius Maluginensis (consular tribune 386 BC), Roman politician and general
- Servius Cornelius Scipio Salvidienus Orfitus, several people
- Servius Fulvius Flaccus, consul 135 BC
- Servius Sulpicius Camerinus Cornutus, (fl. c. 500–463 BC), consul 500 BC
- Servius Sulpicius Camerinus Cornutus (consul 461 BC)
- Servius Sulpicius Galba (disambiguation), several people
- Servius Sulpicius Praetextatus, consular tribune 377, 376, 370, and 368 BC
- Servius Sulpicius Rufus (fl. 1st century BC), Roman jurist
- Servius Sulpicius Similis (died c. 125), eques of ancient Rome, praefectus of Egypt 107–112 AD
- Servius Tullius, sixth king of Rome, r. 578–535 BC
