= Gaius Claudius Severus =

Late 1st/early 2nd century Roman senator, magistrate, consul and governor

Gaius Claudius Severus was a Roman senator who lived in the second half of the 1st century AD and the first half of the 2nd century AD.

== Life ==
Part of a family of Pontian Greek descent, Severus was born and raised in Pompeiopolis, a city in the Roman province of Galatia.

Severus was a magistrate in the reign of the Emperor Trajan (98-117). Trajan had successfully annexed Arabia Petraea in 105 to 106, and appointed Severus as its first governor, who organized the region into a Roman province. Severus remained in the office from 106 until 116.

During his tenure a road, Via Nova Traiana, was paved from Aqaba via Petra to Bostra. There are two surviving letters that mention the construction of the road, sent by Apollonarius, an Egyptian soldier and assistant secretary to Severus, dated to early 107. One is addressed to his father, the other to his mother. A milestone found near Thoana, 54 miles north of Petra, attests that it was completed in 110/111.

He was suffect consul in absentia in the nundinium of October-December 112 with Titus Settidius Firmus as his colleague.

Severus married an unnamed Roman woman and had a son named Gnaeus Claudius Severus Arabianus, ordinary consul in 146.

== Sources ==
- Garzetti, Albino (1974). From Tiberius to the Antonines: a history of the Roman Empire AD 14-192.
- Bowman, Alan K.; Garnsey, Peter; Rathbone, Dominic (2000). The High Empire, A.D. 70-192. The Cambridge ancient history. Vol. 11 (2nd ed.).

Political offices
Preceded by Publius Stertinius Quartus, and Titus Julius Maximus Manlianus as Suffect consuls	Suffect consul of the Roman Empire; 112 with Titus Settidius Firmus	Succeeded by Lucius Publilius Celsus II, and Gaius Clodius Crispinus as Ordinary consuls
