= Gaius Asinius Quadratus =

3rd century Greco-Roman historian

Gaius Asinius Quadratus (Ancient Greek: Κοδράτος) (fl. AD 248) was a Greek historian of Rome and Parthia of the third century. He was a senator who wrote a 15-book history of Rome, Chilieteris ("The Millennium"), which, according to the Suda, covered the period from the founding of Rome until the rule of Alexander Severus. He also wrote a Parthika in nine books, presumably a narrative of the Parthian campaigns of the preceding century. Some scholars attribute to him a Germanika, based on an excerpt preserved by Agathias, although this is debated.

Asinius is the nomen of the gens Asinia of ancient Rome. He was the son of Gaius Julius Asinius Quadratus, who was brother of Gaius Asinius Rufus (born circa 160). These brothers were sons of Gaius Asinius Nicomachus (born circa 135) and his wife and cousin Julia Quadratilla (born circa 145) (or perhaps Asinia Marcellina, descendant of the family of Gaius Asinius Pollio), and grandchildren of Gaius Asinius Rufus (circa 110 – after 136), a notable in Lydia in 134 and 135 who became a Roman senator in 136, and wife Julia.

It has been suggested that Quadratus is identical with a suffect consul of the Severan period, Gaius Asinius Protimus Quadratus.

The "thousand years" of Quadratus' title has been explained in various ways. Felix Jacoby argues that Quadratus unusually dated the founding of Rome to the first Olympiad in 776. Giuseppe Zecchini, though, claims that Quadratus used the traditional dating of the founding of Rome and intended the work to extend to 248, when Philip the Arab celebrated the first millennium, but that he died before its completion. Thirty fragments of his work remain, which have been published by Jacoby in the Fragmente der griechischen Historiker. Most of these derive from the dictionary of Stephanus of Byzantium.
