= Gaius Fonteius Capito (consul AD 12) =

Roman senator during the Principate and consul with Germanicus

Gaius Fonteius Capito (fl. AD 12) was a Roman senator during the Principate. He served as ordinary consul as the colleague of Germanicus in AD 12, and later as proconsul of Asia.

== Family ==
Capito was born a member of the plebeian gens Fonteia. He was the son of Gaius Fonteius Capito (consul suffectus of 33 BC), who was a novus homo ("new man") and the first of the Fonteii to obtain the consulship. This Capito's son was also named Gaius Fonteius Capito, and became consul as well in AD 59.

== Career ==
The date the sortition awarded Capito proconsul of Asia was about ten years after his consulship, that is AD 23/24, although Ronald Syme admits it might have occurred the previous year. During the consulship of Cossus Cornelius and Asinius Agrippa in AD 25, Capito was acquitted of charges made against him by the younger Vibius Serenus.

== See also ==
- Fonteia gens

== Sources ==
- Prosopographia Imperii Romani, F 311

Political offices
Preceded by Lucius Cassius Longinus, and Titus Statilius Taurus	Consul of the Roman Empire; AD 12 with Germanicus	Succeeded by Gaius Visellius Varro as Suffect consul
