= Visellia gens =

Ancient Roman family

The gens Visellia was a family at ancient Rome during the late Republic and early Empire. Two members of this gens achieved the consulship during the first century.

== Praenomina ==
The only praenomina associated with the Visellii appearing in history are Gaius and Lucius. Marcus, Publius, Quintus, and Titus appear in inscriptions.

== Branches and cognomina ==
The surnames associated with the Visellii are Varro and Aculeo. The former was a hereditary cognomen of the family, while the latter appears to have been a personal surname. Varro originally designated a fool, or one given to foolishness, while Aculeo seems to be derived from the adjective aculeus, meaning "sharp, pointy, prickly," or "thorny," presumably a commentary on the acuteness of its bearer's mind, bestowed in contradiction to the family's hereditary surname.

== Members ==
- Gaius Visellius Varro Aculeo, an eques, distinguished for the sharpness of his mind, and his knowledge of the law. He married Cicero's aunt, Helvia.
- Gaius Visellius C. f. Varro, Cicero's cousin, was a military tribune in Asia circa 79 BC. When Cicero was exiled, Varro sought the assistance of one of the tribunes of the plebs to have his cousin recalled. Varro was curule aedile, but died before he could achieve higher office.
- Gaius Visellius C. f. C. n. Varro, consul suffectus from the Kalends of July in AD 12. He is probably the same Visellius Varro who served as legate in Germania Inferior in AD 21.
- Lucius Visellius C. f. C. n. Varro, consul in AD 24, at the request of Sejanus, accused Gaius Silius; but he pretended that he was motivated by the spirit of retribution against his father's rival.

== See also ==
- List of Roman gentes

== Bibliography ==
- Marcus Tullius Cicero, Brutus, De Oratore, Epistulae ad Atticum, In Verrem.
- Publius Cornelius Tacitus, Annales.
- Dictionary of Greek and Roman Biography and Mythology, William Smith, ed., Little, Brown and Company, Boston (1849).
- Theodor Mommsen et alii, Corpus Inscriptionum Latinarum (The Body of Latin Inscriptions, abbreviated CIL), Berlin-Brandenburgische Akademie der Wissenschaften (1853–present).
- René Cagnat et alii, L'Année épigraphique (The Year in Epigraphy, abbreviated AE), Presses Universitaires de France (1888–present).
- George Davis Chase, "The Origin of Roman Praenomina", in Harvard Studies in Classical Philology, vol. VIII (1897).
