= Titus Julius Maximus Manlianus =

Late 1st/early 2nd century Roman senator, military tribune, praetor and governor

Titus Julius Maximus Manlianus was a Roman senator active in the early second century who held a number of offices in the emperor's service. He was suffect consul for the nundinium July to September 112 as the colleague of Publius Stertinius Quartus. His complete name was Titus Julius Maximus Manlianus Brocchus Servilianus Aulus Quadronius [Verus?] Lucius Servilius Vatia Cassius Cam[ars].

The earlier portion of the cursus honorum of Manlianus is known from an inscription found in Nemausus, erected to acknowledge he was the patron of Calagurritanus in Hispania Citerior. He began his public career as one of the decemviri stlitibus judicandis, one of the four boards of minor magistrates that comprise the vigintiviri; this board was attached to the Centumviral court of law. His next documented office was sevir equitum Romanorum at the annual review of the equites at Rome. Manlianus was then commissioned as military tribune of Legio V Macedonica. While assigned to this unit, Manlianus saw combat, for he was awarded dona militaria; Valerie Maxfield, in her monograph on military decorations under the Empire, opines that Manlianus had participated in Domitian's Dacian War. While the V Macedonica was stationed in Syria during Domitian's reign, it was deployed, either the entire unit or a vexillation, to Oescus in the year 81, where it replaced Legio III Gallica. His service as military tribune was followed by his term as quaestor, which he served in Hispania Baetica. Holding the office of quaestor enrolled him in the Senate, whereupon Manlianus advanced through the traditional Republican magistracies of curule aedile and praetor.

Once Manlianus concluded the office of praetor, he was appointed juridicus in Hispania Tarraconensis; perhaps in this role he first formed the connections that led him to becoming patron of Calagurritanus. Next Manlianus was given the commission as legatus legionis or commander of two legions, Legio I Adiutrix, then Legio IV Flavia Felix. Successive command of two legions was uncommon in Imperial times; Anthony Birley has compiled a list of known cases, which totals thirty-three men. Maxfield explains that exigencies of Trajan's Dacian Wars were the reason for Manlianus' opportunity here. Here the inscription from Nemausus ends its account; from a military diploma, we know Manlianus was appointed governor of the newly created imperial province of Pannonia Inferior; Werner Eck dates his tenure as extending from the year 107 to the year 111.

After his consulate, Manlianus' life is a blank.

Political offices
Preceded by Gnaeus Pinarius Cornelius Severus, and Lucius Mummius Niger Quintus Valerius Vegetus as Suffect consuls	Suffect consul of the Roman Empire; 112 with Publius Stertinius Quartus	Succeeded by Gaius Claudius Severus, and Titus Settidius Firmus as Suffect consuls
