= Fonteia gens =

Ancient Roman family

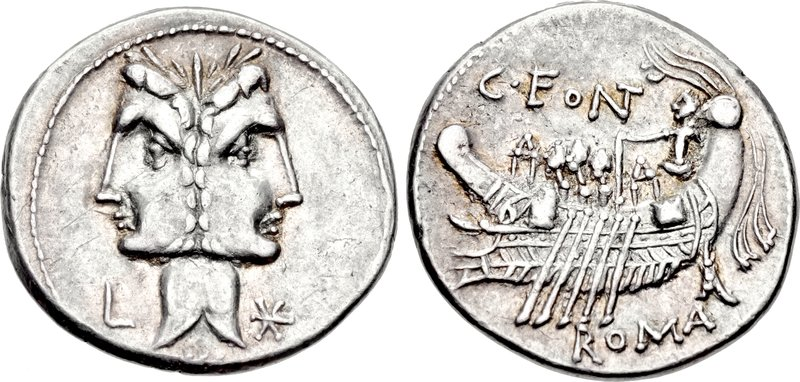
Denarius of Gaius Fonteius, 114-113 BC. The Doscuri are depicted as a Janiform head on the obverse. The reverse shows a galley, a reference to Telegonus, son of Ulysses and legendary founder of Tusculum.

The gens Fonteia was a plebeian family of ancient Rome. Members of this gens are first mentioned toward the end of the third century BC; Titus Fonteius was a legate of Publius Cornelius Scipio during the Second Punic War. The first of the Fonteii to obtain the consulship was Gaius Fonteius Capito, consul suffectus in 33 BC.

== Origin ==
In his oration, Pro Fonteio, Cicero says that the Fonteii were amongst the leading families Tusculum in Latium. The Fonteii claimed descent from Fontus, the son of Janus. A two-faced head appears on a coin of Gaius Fonteius, which Foy-Vaillant identified as the head of Janus, alluding to this tradition. But because Janus is nearly always depicted with a beard, Eckhel concluded that the two faces represent the Dioscuri, who were the object of special reverence at Tusculum, and perhaps the Di Penates of the Fonteii. Other coins of the Fonteii are consistent with this identification, resembling traditional depictions of the Dioscuri.

== Praenomina ==
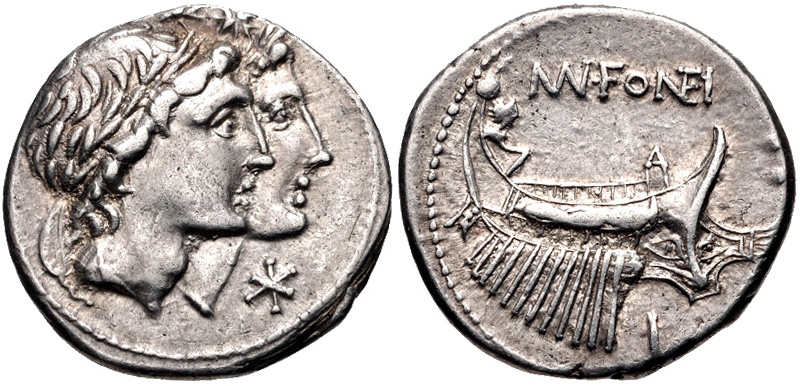
Denarius of Manius Fonteius, 108-107 BC. The obverse depicts the heads of the Dioscuri. The reverse reuses Telegonus' galley, as on the denarius of Gaius Fonteius.

The Fonteii mentioned in history used the praenomina Gaius, Publius, Manius, Marcus, and Titus. All but Manius were amongst the most common names throughout Roman history; Manius was somewhat more distinctive, but favoured by a number of families, including the Fonteii.

== Branches and cognomina ==
The cognomina Capito, Balbus, and Agrippa occur amongst the Fonteii of the Republic and early Empire. Crassus, mentioned by Frontinus, appears to be a scribal error, as the person mentioned has no surname in other sources, and no Fonteii of this name are mentioned elsewhere.

The Fonteii Capitones first appear in the early second century BC, and are last mentioned in the time of the emperor Galba. The surname Capito, derived from the Latin caput, "head", belongs to a large class of cognomina derived from the physical features and peculiarities of individuals, and was originally bestowed on someone with a large or prominent head.

Of the same sort is Balbus, which originally referred to someone given to stammering. The Fonteii Balbi may not have been related to the other Fonteii, as an inscription from Etruria indicates that they belonged to the tribus Sabatina, prevalent in this area, whilst the other Fonteii, from Tusculum, belonged to the tribus Papiria. The only persons of this name mentioned in history lived during the first half of the second century BC.

Agrippa was an old praenomen of uncertain derivation, which by the late Republic had become a common surname. A family with this cognomen flourished under the Julio-Claudian emperors of the first century.

Besides these surnames, Magnus, "great", was the cognomen of a Fonteius who was among the accusers of Varenus Rufus, governor of Bithynia and Pontus in the early second century, among the last of the Fonteii mentioned in ancient writers.

== Members ==
This list includes abbreviated praenomina. For an explanation of this practice, see filiation.

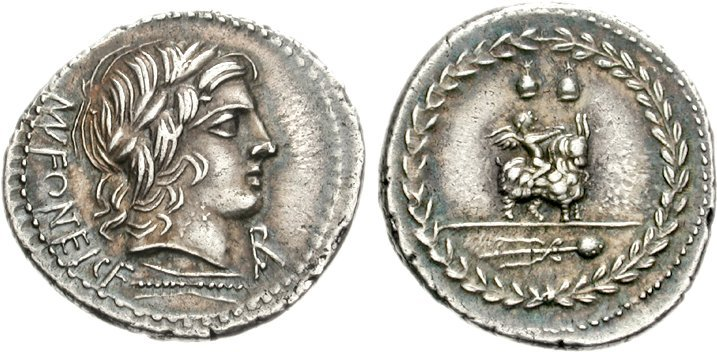
Denarius of Manius Fonteius, 85 BC. The obverse depicts Apollo, as told by the monogram below his chin. The reverse shows a Bacchic scene, with Cupid riding a goat. Another reference to Tusculum is made with the caps of the Dioscuri above them.

- Titus Fonteius was a legate serving under Publius Cornelius Scipio in Spain in BC 212, during the Second Punic War. Following the deaths of Scipio and his brother, Gnaeus, the soldiers chose Lucius Marcius for their commander, although Fonteius was the senior officer; he continued as second in command. Assuming that he is the same person as the Fonteius Crassus whom Frontinus describes, he was brave, if not a particularly capable officer.
- Marcus Fonteius, praetor in BC 166, was assigned the province of Sardinia.
- Manius Fonteius C. f., a senator circa 164 BC.
- Gaius Fonteius, triumvir monetalis in 114 or 113 BC, served as legate under the praetor Gnaeus Servilius Caepio in 90 BC, toward the beginning of the Social War. Both were slain in a riot at Asculum in Picenum.
- Manius Fonteius, triumvir monetalis in 108 or 107 BC, probably a brother or cousin of Gaius Fonteius, moneyer about 114.
- Marcus Fonteius C. f., son of the Gaius Fonteius who died in the Social War, was triumvir monetalis before 87 BC, though he does not seem to have minted any coins. He was praetor in an uncertain year, and propraetor in Gallia Narbonensis from 76 to 73 BC. He was prosecuted for extortion and misgovernment in 69, and defended by Cicero.
- Manius Fonteius C. f., triumvir monetalis in 85 BC, was the brother of Marcus Fonteius, whom Cicero defended. He might be the military tribune named on a denarius issued by Publius Fonteius Capito in 55.
- Fonteia C. f., a Vestal Virgin in 69 BC, and sister of Manius and Marcus Fonteius. When her brother Marcus was accused of maladministration, Cicero introduced Fonteia at his trial, in an emotional appeal to the judges.
- Publius Fonteius, a youth of obscure family, whom Publius Clodius Pulcher chose for his adopted father, although Fonteius was only twenty years old, and Clodius was thirty-five. The object was to permit Clodius, a patrician, to pass over to the plebeians and serve as tribune of the plebs. The adoption was passed in BC 60, though Cicero would later characterize it as illegal and absurd; and Fonteius' first and only paternal act was to emancipate his adopted son.
- Fonteius Magnus, among those who accused Varenus Rufus of extortion during his time as governor of Bithynia. He was likely a native of the province, and when Pliny the Younger spoke in Varenus' defense, Fonteius replied in opposition.

=== Fonteii Capitones ===
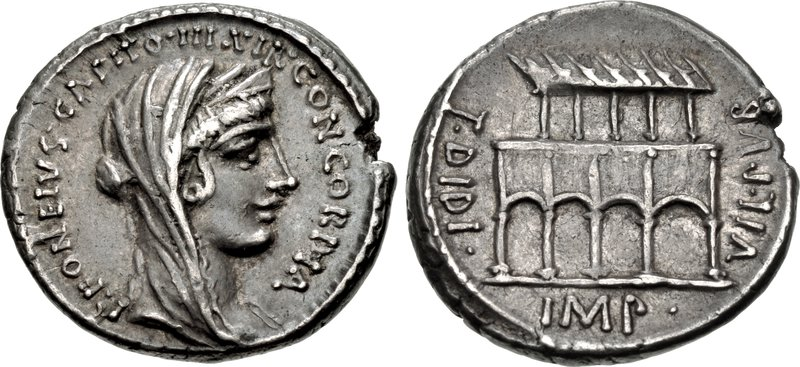
Denarius of Publius Fonteius Capito, 55 BC. The obverse depicts Concordia, an allusion to Cicero's "harmony of the orders". The reverse shows the Villa Publica, with on the left the name of Titus Didius, who restored the building in 98 BC.

- Titus Fonteius Capito, praetor in BC 178, and obtained the command in Hispania Ulterior, which was left to him also for the year following, with the title of proconsul.
- Publius Fonteius Capito, praetor in BC 169, and obtained Sardinia as his province.
- Publius Fonteius P. f. Capito, triumvir monetalis in 55 BC. From the symbolism of his coins, it appears that he was a supporter of Cicero and possibly a relative of Titus Didius, the consul of 98. He should not be confused with the adoptive father of Publius Clodius Pulcher, considering Cicero's enmity toward him.
- Gaius Fonteius C. f. Capito, consul suffectus in 33 BC. He is probably the same Gaius Fonteius Capito who accompanied Maecenas in 37 BC, when the latter was dispatched by Octavian to restore friendship between himself and Mark Antony.
- Gaius Fonteius C. f. C. n. Capito, consul in AD 12, together with Germanicus. Afterward he was appointed proconsul of Asia. In 25, he was accused by Vibius Severus of maladministration during his government of Asia, but Fonteius was acquitted due to lack of evidence.
- Gaius Fonteius C. f. C. n. Capito, consul in AD 59.
- Fonteius C. f. C. n. Capito, consul in AD 67. He may be the same Fonteius Capito who was put to death in Germania during the reign of Galba, in AD 68, on the ground of having attempted to excite an insurrection.
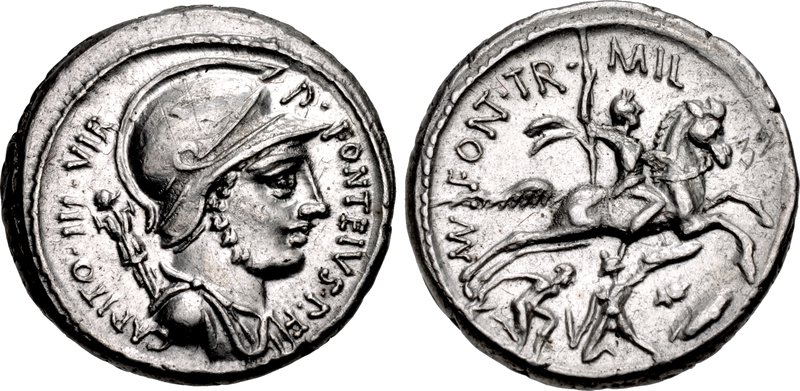
  Denarius of Publius Fonteius Capito, 55 BC. On the obverse is Mars with a trophy behind. The reverse depicts a scene of martial bravery of a Manius Fonteius, charging two enemies.

=== Fonteii Balbi ===
- Publius Fonteius Balbus, praetor in BC 168, was assigned to Spain.
- Marcus Fonteius C. f. Balbus, only known from an inscription. He was perhaps the same as the praetor of Sardinia in BC 166.

=== Fonteii Agrippae ===
- Gaius Fonteius Agrippa, one of the accusers of Marcus Scribonius Libo in AD 16. In 19, he offered his daughter for a Vestal Virgin.
- Fonteia C. f., offered for a Vestal Virgin in AD 19.
- Gaius Fonteius (C. f.) Agrippa, proconsul of Asia in AD 69, he was recalled by Vespasian and placed over Moesia in 70. He was shortly afterwards killed in battle by the Sarmatians.

== See also ==
- List of Roman gentes

== Bibliography ==
- Marcus Tullius Cicero, Epistulae ad Atticum; Pro Domo Sua; Pro Fonteio.
- Titus Livius (Livy), History of Rome.
- Quintus Horatius Flaccus (Horace), Satirae (Satires).
- Gaius Plinius Secundus (Pliny the Elder), Historia Naturalis (Natural History).
- Gaius Plinius Caecilius Secundus (Pliny the Younger), Epistulae (Letters).
- Flavius Josephus, Bellum Judaïcum (The Jewish War).
- Sextus Julius Frontinus, Strategemata (Stratagems).
- Publius Cornelius Tacitus, Annales, Historiae.
- Lucius Mestrius Plutarchus (Plutarch), Lives of the Noble Greeks and Romans.
- Gaius Suetonius Tranquillus, De Vita Caesarum (Lives of the Caesars, or The Twelve Caesars).
- Appianus Alexandrinus (Appian), Bellum Civile (The Civil War).
- Gaius Julius Solinus, De Mirabilis Mundi (On the Wonders of the World).
- Jean Foy-Vaillant, Numismata Imperatorum Romanorum (1674).
- Joseph Hilarius Eckhel, Doctrina Numorum Veterum (The Study of Ancient Coins, 1792–1798).
- Dictionary of Greek and Roman Biography and Mythology, William Smith, ed., Little, Brown and Company, Boston (1849).
- Theodor Mommsen et alii, Corpus Inscriptionum Latinarum (The Body of Latin Inscriptions, abbreviated CIL), Berlin-Brandenburgische Akademie der Wissenschaften (1853–present).
- Wilhelm Dittenberger, Sylloge Inscriptionum Graecarum (Collection of Greek Inscriptions, abbreviated SIG), Leipzig (1883).
- George Davis Chase, "The Origin of Roman Praenomina", in Harvard Studies in Classical Philology, vol. VIII, pp. 103–184 (1897).
- T. Robert S. Broughton, The Magistrates of the Roman Republic, American Philological Association (1952–1986).
- Lily Ross Taylor, The Voting Districts of the Roman Republic, University of Michigan Press (1960).
- Michael Crawford, Roman Republican Coinage, Cambridge University Press (1974, 2001).
