= Aulus Larcius Priscus =

Aulus Larcius Priscus was a Roman senator and general who held several posts in the emperor's service. His career is unusual in that Priscus held a very senior post — governor of Syria — at an unusually early point in his life. He was suffect consul for the nundinium of October to December 110 with Sextus Marcius Honoratus as his colleague. Priscus is known almost entirely from inscriptions.

Martha W. Baldwin Bowsky has set forth the evidence of Priscus' ancestry. He was the son of Aulus Larcius Lepidus Sulpicianus and Caecina A.f. Larga; a sister has been identified for him, Larcia A.f. Priscilla. His father Sulpicianus is best known as quaestor to the proconsular governor of Crete and Cyrenaica and commander of Legio X Fretensis in the year 70; his cursus honorum does not list any offices from praetor forward, so it is possible Sulpicianus died before he reached that rank. Priscus' maternal grandfather was Gaius Silius, consul in AD 13. His paternal grandparents were Aulus Larcius Gallus, a member of the equestrian class, and Sulpicia Telero, a daughter of the aristocracy of Crete.

== Career up to Syria ==
Due to an inscription erected in Timgad in current-day Algeria by a civic council commemorating his status as town patron, his career is known up to the point he held the consulate. Priscus set up a dedication to Jupiter Optimus Maximus a few years earlier at Foum-Meriel, also in Algeria, which helps to determine the sequence of some of his offices.

Priscus began his career serving as the sevir equitum Romanorum at the annual review of the equites. Next he was one of the magistrates known as the decemviri stlitibus judicandis, one of the four boards that formed the vigintiviri; membership in one of these four boards was a preliminary and required first step toward gaining entry into the Roman Senate. Next Priscus was appointed a quaestor, which admitted him to the senate. Of the twenty quaestors appointed each year, ten were allocated to assist the proconsuls of the public provinces; Priscus was allocated to the proconsular governor of Asia, a choice position.

It was while Priscus was quaestor of Asia that his career took an unusual turn. The next post listed was legatus legionis or commander of Legio IV Scythica, which was stationed in the adjacent province of Syria; normally a senator was not assigned command of a legion until he had been praetor, a much higher grade than Priscus had yet achieved. And the post after that was even more extraordinary: governor of the province of Syria itself, a post that usually required the man to have been consul first. According to reliable sources, Priscus was governor of Syria in 97/98, twelve years prior to becoming consul.

There is a likely explanation for this anomaly. Writing to his friend about the short reign of the emperor Nerva, Pliny the Younger alludes to alarmed reports concerning a man in charge of a massive army in the eastern part of the empire. It is commonly presumed that this person was the governor of Syria; further, due to the date, this person is commonly assumed to be a rival to Trajan for the position of successor to Nerva. Priscus' predecessor as governor of Syria was Marcus Cornelius Nigrinus Curiatius Maternus, an experienced general who had won victories for Domitian in his Dacian Wars, who disappears from history at this point. Any rival to Trajan, upon the latter's ascension to the throne, at the least would have been removed from an imperial position, and at most would have been executed. There is no record of Maternus after AD 97.

== Career after Syria ==
After this anomalous assumption of authority, Priscus returned to Rome and resumed his career in the emperor's service. He held the next two republican magistracies, plebeian tribune and praetor, then served as legate to the proconsular governor of Hispania Baetica. After that he was praefectus frumenti dandi (the prefect responsible for the distribution of Rome's free grain dole). Then followed a pair of military commands, first as legate of Legio II Augusta in Roman Britain, then a second legion, Legio III Augusta during the years 105 to 108. Command of the III Augusta was the equivalent of being governor of Numidia, where the legion was stationed. While in Numidia, he engaged in a military campaign, but almost nothing is known of his expedition. Priscus was then awarded by the sortition the proconsular governorship of Gallia Narbonensis for the years 108/109.

The same year Priscus was consul, he was also admitted into the priesthood of the Septemviri epulonum. His activities following his consulship are unknown. Edmund Groag suggested that an inscription indicated that Priscus was governor of Cappadocia at one point; however, Frederik Juliaan Vervaet has since shown that the inscription in question actually refers to general Corbulo. Anthony Birley speculates, on the basis of grammatical mistakes in one of his inscriptions, that Priscus' poor literacy limited his advancement.

== Family ==
Although the name of his wife is not known, Aulus Larcius Lepidus Plarianus, a suffect consul at some point in the third quarter of the second century, is commonly considered to have been either Priscus' son or grandson.

Political offices
| Preceded by Lucius Catilius Severus Julianus Claudius Reginus, and Gaius Erucianus Silo as Suffect consul | Suffect consul of the Roman Empire; 110 with Sextus Marcius Honoratus | Succeeded by Gaius Calpurnius Piso, and Marcus Vettius Bolanus as Ordinary consul |
