= Servius Cornelius Dolabella Metilianus Pompeius Marcellus =

2nd century Roman senator and consul

Servius Cornelius Dolabella Metilianus Pompeius Marcellus was a Roman senator and patrician. He was suffect consul for the first nundinium of the year 113 as the colleague of Gaius Clodius Crispinus; Marcellus replaced the consul prior Lucius Publilius Celsus, who stepped down as consul at the end of January.

An inscription from Corfinium, erected by the citizens of that city to acknowledge that Marcellus had become the patron of Corfinio, provides the praenomina of his paternal ancestors: Marcellus' father was "Servius", his grandfather "Publius", his great-grandfather also "Publius" and his great-great-grandfather also "Publius". Based on this filiation, Patrick Tansey identifies Marcellus' father as Servius Cornelius Dolabella Petronianus, consul in 86; Petronianus' father was Publius Cornelius Dolabella, consul in 55, his grandfather Publius Cornelius Dolabella, consul in the year 10, and his great-grandfather Publius Cornelius Dolabella, consul in 35 BC. Tansey also identifies the mother of Marcellus as Petronianus' first wife, Metilia, from whom Marcellus inherited the last three elements in his name, Metilianus Pompeius Marcellus; this suggests a connection with the Metilia gens. Lastly, Tansey surmises Dolabella Veranianus, known to have been one of the Arval Brethren and son of Petronianus by his second wife, Verania, was the half-brother of Marcellus.

== Life ==
The Corfinio inscription provides a cursus honorum for Marcellus. The offices it records attests that Marcellus was a member of the Patrician order, as if his ancestry as a member of the gens Cornelii left any doubt. Marcellus began his public career in the tresviri monetalis, the most prestigious of the four boards that comprise the vigintiviri; assignment to this board was usually allocated to patricians or individuals favored by the emperor. His next documented office was as a member of one of the junior priesthoods, the salii Palatini, which was one of the last Roman priesthoods still populated solely by patricians. Next Marcellus was quaestor to Emperor Trajan, another honor usually allocated to patricians or individuals favored by the emperor. Upon completion of this traditional Republican magistracy Marcellus would be enrolled in the Senate. Here the inscription mentions Marcellus was sevir equitum Romanorum at the annual review of the equites at Rome.

Marcellus is recorded as holding the Republican magistracy of praetor, after which his next documented office was consul. One of the privileges of the patrician order under the Empire was accession to the consulship within a few years after stepping down as praetor, freed of serving as governor of any provinces, public or imperial, or accepting a commission from the emperor as military tribune or legatus. The only office after the consulate recorded for Marcellus on this inscription is another Roman priesthood, Flamen Quirinalis.

His later life is almost a blank. Because the Corfinio inscription refers to Trajan as divi Trajani Parthici, it was erected after the death of Trajan in 117, and attests Marcellus was alive at least as late as that year. Since no Cornelius Dolabella is recorded as living after Marcellus, it is likely he was the last of his family.

Political offices
Preceded by Lucius Publilius Celsus II, and Gaius Clodius Crispinus as Ordinary consuls	Suffect consul of the Roman Empire; 113 with Gaius Clodius Crispinus	Succeeded by Lucius Stertinius Noricus, and Lucius Fadius Rufinus as Suffect consuls
