= Lucius Visellius Varro =

Roman senator active during the reign of Tiberius

Lucius Visellius Varro was a Roman senator, who was active during the reign of Tiberius. He was consul in AD 24 as the colleague of Servius Cornelius Cethegus. He is best known for accusing Gaius Silius of being complicit in Sacrovir's revolt and misappropriating money from the provincial government in Gaul. His prosecution ended with Silius' death.

Varro was the son of Gaius Visellius Varro, consul in the year 12.

== Life ==
Also during the year of his consulate, Varro prosecuted Gaius Silius consul in 13. The charges were that, concerning his suppression of a revolt in Gaul of a faction of Treveri and Aeduan three years before, Silius had been complicit in that revolt and misappropriated money from the provincial government in Gaul. Refusing to submit a plea or to defend himself, Silius declared that had he not personally kept the legions on the Rhine from avenging the murder of Germanicus, Tiberius would have lost his position as Princeps. Faced with false witnesses swearing that he had robbed the Gallic provinces, Silius committed suicide.

According to an inscription, Varro was appointed curator riparum et alvei Tiberis, one of the officials responsible for public works inside the city, regulating the Tiber and the maintenance of Rome's sanitation system, with Gaius Vibius Rufus.

== Legislation ==
Varro's consulate was known for several pieces of legislation, which included the lex Visellia de iure Quiritium Latinorum qui inter vigiles militaverant, and the Lex Visellia de poenis libertinorum qui ingenuorum honores usurpabant. These two laws, possibly a single piece of legislation, pertain to freedpersons (libertini). The first rewarded former slaves who held only Latin rights with full Roman citizenship after they served six years in the vigiles, the equivalent of police and firefighting services in the city of Rome; the second penalized libertini if they tried to pass as freeborn people (ingenui) and access privileges denied to them by their status.

Political offices
Preceded by Gaius Asinius Pollio, and Gaius Stertinius Maximus	Ordinary consul of the Roman Empire; 24 with Servius Cornelius Cethegus	Succeeded by Gaius Calpurnius Aviola, and Publius Cornelius Lentulus Scipio as Suffect consuls
