= Gaius Calvisius Sabinus (consul 26) =

First century Roman senator, consul, and governor of Pannonia

Gaius Calvisius Sabinus was a Roman senator, who was consul in AD 26 as the colleague of Gnaeus Cornelius Lentulus Gaetulicus. During the reign of Caligula, he was accused of conspiring against the emperor, and took his own life rather than submit to a trial.

== Family ==
Calvisius was probably the son of Gaius Calvisius Sabinus, consul in 4 BC, and grandson of Gaius Calvisius Sabinus, consul in 39 BC. His wife, Cornelia, may have been the sister of Cornelius Lentulus, Calvisius' colleague in the consulship.

== Career ==
Calvisius is first heard of when he and Cornelius were named consules ordinarii for AD 26. This was the year in which Tiberius left Rome for Campania, never to return. On the Kalends of July, the consuls were replaced by Quintus Junius Blaesus and Lucius Antistius Vetus.

Tiberius' removal from Rome may have been influenced by his advisor Sejanus, who assumed power in the emperor's absence. Sejanus fell from power and was executed the year of his own consulship, AD 31. The following year, Calvisius and three other men of consular rank were accused of maiestas. One of the informers, a tribune of a city cohort by the name of Celsus, gave testimony that exculpated Calvisius and Appius Junius Silanus, consul in AD 28. Tiberius deferred action against the other two, Gaius Annius Pollio and Mamercus Aemilius Scaurus.

During the reign of Caligula, Calvisius was appointed governor of Pannonia, and given the command of two legions. The emperor recalled the governor in AD 39, suspecting Calvisius and his wife of plotting against him, and brought charges against both. Cornelia was accused of entering the camp at night dressed as a soldier, interfering with the guard, and committing adultery in the general's headquarters. As their condemnation was certain, they put an end to their own lives before the trial could begin.

== See also ==
- Calvisia gens

== Bibliography ==
- Publius Cornelius Tacitus, Annales, Historiae.
- Lucius Cassius Dio Cocceianus (Cassius Dio), Roman History.
- Dictionary of Greek and Roman Biography and Mythology, William Smith, ed., Little, Brown and Company, Boston (1849).
- Robin Seager, Tiberius, Blackwell (1972, 2005).
- Ronald Syme, The Augustan Aristocracy, Clarendon Press, Oxford (1989).
- Anthony A. Barrett, Agrippina: Sex, Power, and Politics in the Early Empire, Yale University Press, (1996).
- Steven H. Rutledge, Imperial Inquisitions: Prosecutors and Informants from Tiberius to Domitian, Routledge, (2001).

Political offices
Preceded by Gaius Petronius, and Marcus Asinius Agrippa	Consul of the Roman Empire; 26 with Gnaeus Cornelius Lentulus Gaetulicus	Succeeded by Quintus Junius Blaesus, and Lucius Antistius Vetus as Suffect consuls
