= Lex Visellia =

A lex Visellia ("Visellian law") was any Roman law passed by someone whose name was Visellius.

== Lex Visellia de cura viarum ==
A lex Visellia dating around or before 68 BC is known only from a mention in an inscription that lists the ten-member board of tribunes overseeing specific road repairs (cura viarum). The lex seems to have outlined how public roads were funded and maintained and how the work was contracted. It was possibly authored by the Gaius Visellius Varro who was a cousin of Cicero and a quaestor by 73 BC.

== Lex Visellia of AD 24 ==
The lex Visellia of AD 24 granted full Roman citizenship to informally manumitted slaves after they had served for six years as vigiles, the ancient Roman equivalent of police and firefighters. The law was passed during the consulship of Lucius Visellius Varro. The term of service was later shortened by a decree of the senate to three years.

Slaves received Roman citizenship automatically when they had been manumitted by a citizen owner through certain legal procedures recognized by the state. Slaves whose manumission did not meet these formal criteria held a form of Latin rights, codified by the lex Iunia Norbana and based on a status originally developed for the Italian allies that was not embedded in the particular social structures of the city of Rome. The lex Visellia was one of several pathways to full citizenship for informally manumitted slaves, called Junian Latins in modern scholarship.

== Bibliography ==
- Carlà-Uhink, Filippo (2022). "The Impact of Roman Roads on Landscape and Space: The Case of Republican Italy". In Horster, Marietta; Hächler, Nikolas (eds.). The Impact of the Roman Empire on Landscapes: Proceedings of the Fourteenth Workshop of the International Network Impact of Empire (Mainz, June 12-15, 2019). Impact of Empire. Vol. 41. Brill. pp. 69–91.
- Rodríguez Garrido, Jacobo (2023). "Imperial Legislation Concerning Junian Latins: From Tiberius to the Severan Dynasty". In Barja, Pedro López; Doria, Carla Masi; Roth, Ulrike (eds.). Junian Latinity in the Roman Empire, Volume 1: History, Law, Literature. Edinburgh Studies in Ancient Slavery. Edinburgh University Press. pp. 104–122.
- Hough, John N. (1930). "The Lex Lutatia and the Lex Plautia De Vi". American Journal of Philology. 51 (2): 135–147. doi:10.2307/289862. JSTOR 289862.
- Syme, Ronald (1963). "Ten Tribunes". Journal of Roman Studies. 53 (1/2): 55–60. doi:10.2307/298364. JSTOR 298364.
