= Gaius Aculeo =

1st-century BC Roman jurist

Gaius Aculeo was a Roman knight who married the sister of Helvia, the mother of Cicero. He was unsurpassed in his day in his knowledge of the Roman law, and possessed great acuteness of mind, but was not distinguished for other attainments. He was a friend of Lucius Licinius Crassus, renowned as the greatest Roman orator of his day, and was defended by him upon one occasion. The son of Aculeo was Gaius Visellius Varro; from which it would appear that Aculeo was only a surname given to the father from his acuteness, and that his full name was Gaius Visellius Varro Aculeo.

== See also ==
- Visellia gens – Ancient Roman family
