= Marcus Junius Homullus =

Late 1st/early 2nd century Roman senator, consul and governor

Marcus Junius Homullus was a Roman senator active in the late 1st and early 2nd centuries AD, who occupied a number of offices in the imperial service. He also served as suffect consul for the nundinium of September to December 102 as the colleague of Lucius Antonius Albus. Bernard Rémy notes that his cognomen, "Homullus", appears primarily in Italy, so this may be where his origins lie.

Pliny the Younger mentions Homullus in three of his letters. In the first, Pliny mentions that Homullus and Tiberius Catius Caesius Fronto defended Julius Bassus against charges of malfeasance while governor of Bithynia and Pontus. In the second, Pliny writes how he and Homullus defended Varenus Rufus against exactly the same charges. In the third, Pliny writes that Homullus spoke in the matter of reforming the rules of Senate elections.

Only one office is securely attested for Homullus: governor of the imperial province of Cappadocia; Werner Eck dates his tenure in that province from the year 111 to the year 114. He was the first governor of this province after its creation when the earlier province that covered most of Asia Minor was divided into Cappadocia and Galatia. While he was governor, the emperor Trajan visited the province while he was engaged on his Parthian campaign; when the Armenian king Parthamasiris demanded that Trajan send to him Homullus, Trajan instead sent Homullus' son. This son has been identified as the suffect consul of 128, Marcus Junius Homullus.

Homullus may have been the M. Junius who was pontifex in the year 101–102, whose calator was M. Junius Epaphroditus.

== Homullus and the Emperor ==
William McDermott has identified this Junius Homullus as the Homullus who is quoted in the Historia Augusta as saying to Trajan, "Domitian was a bad emperor, but had good advisors." McDermott believes this anecdote was drawn from the hypothetical source for the Historia Augusta, the history of Marius Maximus. He notes that the identification is only possible if Homullus had an opportunity to confront Trajan, and points out the two were together in Cappadocia. Trajan had come under the influence of his military advisors, and had decided to expand the borders of the empire. "Such an eastern campaign must have been considered a dubious exploit, or even disastrous, by many of the members of the senate, even though it only gradually became evident how far the emperor would go," McDermott writes. "Surely Hadrian, if he were consulted, and his clique must have been appalled."

McDermott speculates further that Homullus counted on Trajan's affability to avoid a charge of maiestas laesa; however, Trajan decided to replace him with Lucius Catilius Severus. "Whether Homullus held any further office is not known," McDermott writes, "but his confrontation with Trajan was so much in accordance with Hadrian's future actions as emperor that he probably fared well after Trajan's death."

Political offices
Preceded by Titus Didius Secundus, and Lucius Publilius Celsus as Suffect consuls	Suffect consul of the Roman Empire; 103 with Lucius Antonius Albus	Succeeded by Trajan V, and Manius Laberius Maximus II as Ordinary consuls
