= Lucius Munatius Plancus (consul 13) =

Lucius Munatius Plancus was a Roman senator and consul.

A son of Lucius Munatius Plancus (consul in 42 BC), he became consul in 13 AD. In AD 14 he went as legate to Germany to help suppress the Rhine legions' mutiny with little success. He was married to Aemilia Paulla, daughter of Aemilius Lepidus Paullus.

Political offices
Preceded by Germanicus Iulius Caesar, and Gaius Visellius Varro	Consul of the Roman Empire; 13 with Gaius Silius, followed by Aulus Caecina Largus	Succeeded by Sextus Pompeius, and Sextus Appuleius
