= Lucius Publilius Celsus =

2nd century Roman senator and confidant of the emperor Trajan

Lucius Publilius Celsus (executed 118) was a Roman senator as well as a confidant of the emperor Trajan. He was consul twice: the first time as suffect consul for the nundinium of May to August 102 as the colleague of Titus Didius Secundus; the second time as ordinary consul for the year 113 with Gaius Clodius Crispinus as his colleague.

Dio Cassius records the fact that Celsus was one of three men the emperor Trajan honored during their lives with statues, the other two men being Aulus Cornelius Palma Frontonianus and Quintus Sosius Senecio, which attests to his importance. Anthony Birley suggests that he accompanied Trajan on the latter's expedition against the Parthians. Upon the death of Trajan, his power and influence was such that Trajan's successor, Hadrian, felt threatened and had him executed along with Cornelius Palma in 118; the account in the Augustan History adds two more men to those Hadrian ordered executed, Lusius Quietus and Gaius Avidius Nigrinus. Although the Augustan History states that the four men had been united in a conspiracy against Hadrian, John D. Grainger suggests the men may have been executed because they were inconvenient.

Despite the evident importance of Celsus in Trajan's court, little more than these facts are known about him. Ronald Syme opines that the statue and other known details imply he held a consular military command.

Political offices
Preceded by Lucius Julius Ursus Servianus II, and Lucius Fabius Justus as Suffect consuls	Suffect consul of the Roman Empire; 102 with Titus Didius Secundus	Succeeded by Lucius Antonius Albus, and Marcus Junius Homullus as Suffect consuls
Preceded by Gaius Claudius Severus, and Titus Settidius Firmus as Suffect consuls	Consul of the Roman Empire; 113 with Gaius Clodius Crispinus	Succeeded by Servius Cornelius Dolabella Metilianus Pompeius Marcellus as Suffect consul
