= Varena gens =

Ancient Roman family

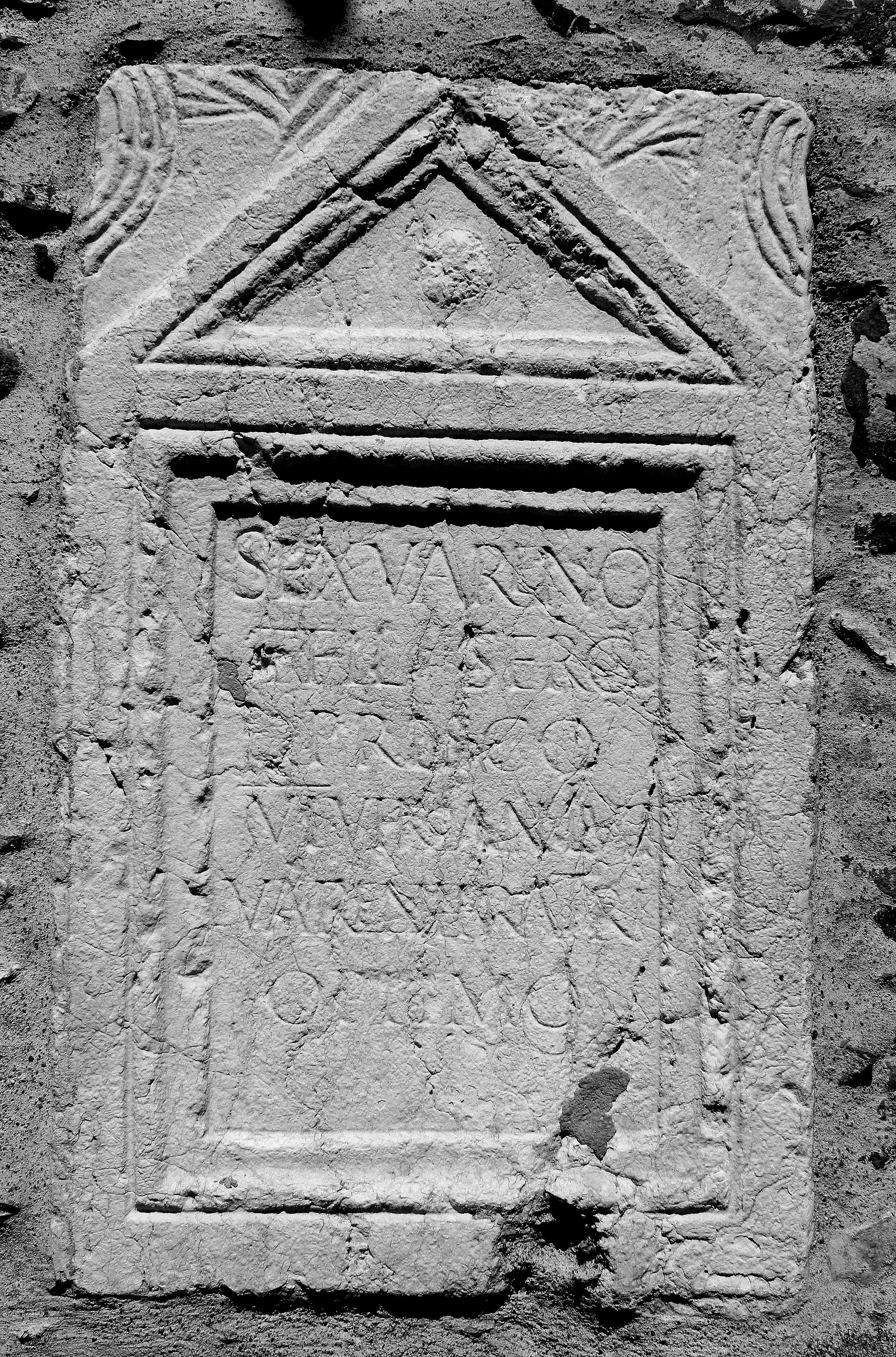
Monument of Sextus Varenus Priscus at Tarnaiae Nantuatium.

The gens Varena or Varenia, rarely Vorena, was a minor plebeian family at ancient Rome. Only a few members of this gens are mentioned in Roman literature, but many others are known from inscriptions. Several of the Vareni held minor magistracies at Rome or in other towns during imperial times, including Lucius Varenus Lucullus, who was a military tribune and pontifex during the first century, and Quintus Varenus Ingenuus, who served as aedile and quaestor. Vorena, a woman of this family during the second or third century, seems to have been a Vestal Virgin.

== Origin ==
The nomen Varenus belongs to a class of gentilicia ending in -enus, typically derived from other nomina, or occasionally from the names of places. Many of the Vareni are known from inscriptions from towns of Umbria and Sabina, likely indicating their place of origin.

== Praenomina ==
The main praenomina of the Vareni were Marcus, Lucius, and Titus, followed by Publius and Gaius. All of these were among the most common praenomina throughout Roman history. A few of the Vareni are found with other praenomina, including Quintus and Gnaeus, while there are individual examples of Decimus, Sextus, and Statius, a praenomen found primarily among the Oscan and Umbrian-speaking peoples of Italy. A freedwoman named Rufa Vorena who lived under the early Empire provides an example of a feminine praenomen.

== Members ==
This list includes abbreviated praenomina. For an explanation of this practice, see filiation.

- Varena C. l., a freedwoman, dedicated a first-century BC tomb at Spoletium in Umbria for her husband, Publius Marcius Varus.
- Lucius Varenus, accused of murdering Gaius Varenus and attempting to murder Gnaeus Varenus, was defended by Cicero about 79 BC, but nonetheless convicted. Cicero's oration has been lost.
- Gaius Varenus, murdered about 80 BC, ostensibly by his relative, Lucius Varenus, who was convicted despite being defended by Cicero.
- Gnaeus Varenus, said to have survived an attempt on his life by his relative, Lucius Varenus, who was tried and convicted for the crime, along with the murder of Gaius Varenus.
- Gnaeus Varenus L. f., the husband of Rutila Brutsena, with whom he was buried at Interamnia Praetuttiorum in Picenum, in a tomb dating between the middle of the first century BC and the middle of the first century AD.
- Lucius Varenus or Vorenus, a centurion under the command of Quintus Cicero during the Gallic Wars. He and a rival, Titus Pulfio, fought heroically against the Gauls during a sortie, each rescuing the other despite their rivalry.
- Marcus Varenus M. l. Anteros, a freedman mentioned in a funeral inscription from Rome, dating from the latter half of the first century BC.
- Lucius Varenus St. f. Taurus, buried at Volsinii in Etruria, in a tomb dating from the latter half of the first century BC.
- Rufa Vorena P. l. Ge, a freedwoman named in an inscription from Cales in Campania, dating from the late first century BC, or the early first century AD.
- Lucius Varenus L. f. Celer, named in a first-century sepulchral inscription from Amiternum in Sabinum.
- Varenus Clarus, a freedman named in a first-century sepulchral inscription from Fulginiae in Umbria.
- Marcus Varenius Diogenes, built a first-century sepulchre at Rome for himself, his wife, Veturia Maxima, and for Marcus Varenius Fortunatus Maius and Marcus Varenius Fortunatus, probably their sons.
- Marcus Varenius Fortunatus, a boy buried at Rome, aged seven years, ten months, and fifteen days, in a first-century sepulchre at Rome, built by Marcus Varenius Diogenes, likely his father, for himself, his wife, Veturia Maxima, and Marcus Varenius Fortunatus Maius, perhaps another son.
- Marcus Varenius Fortunatus Maius, buried at Rome in a first-century sepulchre built by Marcus Varenius Diogenes, probably his father, for himself, his wife, Veturia Maxima, and another Marcus Varenius Fortunatus, perhaps another son.
- Varenia M. l. Eleutheris, a freedwoman buried at Rome, aged twenty, named in a first-century sepulchral inscription, along with Marcus Varenius Maximus.
- Marcus Varenus Felix, named in a first-century inscription from Rome.
- Marcus Varenius Maximus, named in a first-century sepulchral inscription from Rome, along with the freedwoman Varenia Eleutheris.
- Vorena I[...] Maxima, named in a first-century sepulchral inscription from Amiternum, along with the freedwoman Coelia Salvia.
- Varena Sabina, the wife of Gnaeus Caninius Faustus, with whom she was buried at Tusculum in Latium, in a family sepulchre built by the freedman Marcus Publilius Stratus, dating from the first half of the first century.
- Varena Cn. l. Hilara, a freedwoman buried in a first-century tomb at Forum Cassii in Etruria.
- Sextus Varenus T. f. Priscus, one of the Seviri Augustales, buried at Tarnaiae Nantuatium in Alpes Poeninae, aged fifty-seven, in a tomb dating from the first century, dedicated by one or more of his siblings.
- Varena Lacte, the wife of Gaius Alledius Marcellus, with whom she dedicated a first- or second-century tomb at Vicus Fificulanus in Sabinum for their son, Gaius Alledius Marcellus, aged fourteen years, four months, and twenty-seven days.
- Decimus Varenus Bitia, a physician, some of whose prescriptions are recorded in an inscription from the site of modern Rubenach, formerly part of Germania Inferior, dating between the first century and the middle of the third.
- Quintus Varenus, buried at Hispellum in Umbria, in a sepulchre dating from the beginning of the first century. The freedman Lucius Varenus Chilo was buried in the same sepulchre.
- Lucius Varenus Chilo, the freedman of Niger, buried in a sepulchre at Hispellum, dating from the beginning of the first century. A Quintus Varenus was buried in the same sepulchre.
- Varena C. f. Candida, the wife of Gaius Arruntius Ingenuus, buried at Carnuntum in Pannonia Superior, aged thirty-five, in a family sepulchre dating from the early or middle part of the first century, built by her husband for Varena and their sons, Gaius Arruntius Lentulus, aged five, and Gaius Arruntius Ligus, aged three.
- Varena Lycoris, made an offering to Fortuna at Fulginiae, recorded in an inscription from the early first century.
- Lucius Varenus L. f. Lucullus, one of the municipal duumvirs at Fulginiae, had been a military tribune, praefectus fabrum, in charge of the military engineers, and pontifex. His career is recorded in an inscription dating between the reigns of Tiberius and Claudius.
- Varenia Montanilla, the daughter of Montanus, buried at the site of modern Cavillargues, formerly part of Aquitania, aged twenty-two, in a tomb built by her husband, Quintus Solonius Philippus, dating between the first and third century.
- Varena Q. f. Major, the wife of Marcus Lartidius, named in inscriptions from Tibur.
- Marcus Varenus Ɔ. M. Lartidi l. Clarus, freed by Marcus Lartidius and his wife, Varena Major, according to an inscription from Nola in Campania, dating from AD 21.
- Marcus Varenus Ɔ. M. Lartidi l. Diphilus, freed by Marcus Lartidius and his wife, Varena Major, made a donation to the maintenance of the temple of Hercules at Tibur in Latium.
- Marcus Varenus Herma, buried at Rome in a tomb dating from the middle portion of the first century, dedicated by his clientes Marcus Varenus Hermes and Marcus Varenus Eutychus.
- Marcus Varenus Hermes, together with Marcus Varenus Eutychus, dedicated a mid-first-century tomb at Rome for their patron, Marcus Varenus Herma.
- Marcus Varenus Eutychus, together with Marcus Varenus Hermes, dedicated a mid-first-century tomb at Rome for their patron, Marcus Varenus Herma.
- Quintus Varenus C. f. Ingenuus, buried at Tuder in Sabinum, along with his concubine, Flaminia Horeis, in a tomb dating between the middle of the first and end of the second century, had been aedile, quaestor, and duumvir jure dicundo.
- Marcus Varenus M. f. Valens, a veteran of the Legio VII Claudia, made a will naming his freedman, Marcus Varenus Secundus, as his heir, commemorated by an inscription from Aequum in Dalmatia, dating between the reign of Claudius and the middle of the second century.
- Marcus Varenus M. l. Secundus, the freedman of Marcus Varenus Valens, who named him as his heir, according to an inscription from Aequum, dating between the reign of Claudius and the middle of the second century.
- Marcus Varenus Tyrannus, the freedman of Clarus, mentioned in an inscription relating to the amphitheatre at Praeneste in Latium, dating from the latter part of the reign of Claudius.
- Varena Chelido, dedicated a tomb at Rome, dating between the middle of the first and the middle of the second century, for her patron and husband, Publius Aerenus Teres, aged forty-nine.
- Marcus Varenus Aprilis, a potter whose maker's mark has been found on small earthenware from Pompeii in Campania.
- Marcus Varenus Crescens, a potter whose work has been found at Pompeii.
- Publius Varenus Zetus, named on a first-century bronze label from Pompeii.
- Publius Varenus Q. f. Modestus, a native of Ariminum in Cisalpine Gaul, was a soldier in the ninth cohort of the Praetorian Guard at Rome, serving in the century of Maturus. He was buried in a first-century tomb at Rome, aged forty, having served for twenty years.
- Varena Secunda, named in a late first- or early second-century inscription from Rome, along with a Tessia.
- Titus Varenus Priscus, one of the seviri Augustales, buried at Ameria in Umbria, in a tomb dating between the middle of the first century and the end of the second.
- Varenus Atilius, together with his wife, Severina, dedicated a second-century tomb at Peltuinum in Sabinum for their son, Chrestus, aged six years, one month.
- Varenius Fortunatus, inurned in a second-century cinerarium at Rome, along with Aemilia Ammia.
- Varenia Helena, together with Lucius Valerius Justus, one of the heirs of Valerius of Alexandria, a soldier buried in a second-century tomb at Misenum in Campania, aged fifty-six years, four months, and twelve days, having served for twenty-six years. The inscription naming them may be a modern forgery.
- Marcus Varenius Januarius, buried at Rome, aged ninety-six, along with his wife, Lusia Nomice, in a second-century tomb dedicated by their client, Marcus Varenius Felix.
- Marcus Varenius Felix, dedicated a second-century tomb at Rome for his patrons, Marcus Varenius Januarius and his wife, Lusia Nomice.
- Varenia Justina, the wife of Thorasius Felix, with whom she dedicated a second-century tomb at Sassina in Umbria for their daughter, Thorasia Marcellina, aged fourteen years, seven months, and fourteen days.
- Gaius Varenus Privatus, buried in a second-century tomb at Aquileia in Venetia and Histria, dedicated by his daughter, Clodia Moschis.
- Varena, a woman named in a second- or third-century sepulchral inscription from Viminacium in Moesia Superior.
- Vorena, at one time a Vestal Virgin, dedicated a second- or third-century tomb at Ostia in Latium for her son, Quintus Vorenus.
- Quintus Vorenus, buried in a second- or third-century tomb at Ostia, dedicated by his mother, Vorena, who had been a Vestal Virgin.
- Varenia Felicissima, dedicated a second- or third-century tomb at Rome for her daughter, Aurelia Hermione.
- Varena Jucunda, the wife of Gaius Turranius Hermadion, with whom she dedicated a second- or third-century tomb at Rome for their children, Augurinus, aged twelve years, two months, twenty-five days, and Augurina, aged six years, four months, four days.
- Varenius Montanus, buried at Lambaesis in Numidia, aged sixty-seven, in a second- or third-century tomb built by his wife, Julia Licinia.
- Varenus Rufus, governor of Bithynia and Pontus from AD 105 to 106.
- Titus Varenius Probus, one of the duumvirs at Sarmizegetusa in Dacia, where he was buried in a tomb built by his son, Varenius Pudens, dating from the early second century.
- Titus Varenius T. f. Pudens, an eques, and flamen of the Roman colony at Sarmizgetusa, where he dedicated an early second-century tomb for his father, Titus Varenius Probus.
- Publius Varenius Nerva, one of the donors to the enlargement of a mid-second-century temple at Ostia in Latium.
- Publius Varenius Zethus, another of the donors to the enlargement of the temple at Ostia.
- Varena Quinta, built a mid- to late-second century tomb at Iader in Dalmatia for her husband, Marcus Cursineius Dexter.
- Marcus Varenius Hermes, a nummularius, or money changer, built a tomb for his wife, Masclinia Aquina, at Colonia in Germania Inferior, dating from the latter half of the second century.
- Lucius Varenius Rufus, possibly a tribune, made an offering to Jupiter at Misenum, dating between the middle of the second century and the middle of the third.
- Varena, the mother of a woman buried at Misenum between the latter half of the second century, and the first half of the third, aged twenty-three. A Macrinus named shortly before Varena might be the woman's father.
- Varena Donata, dedicated a tomb at Rome, dating from the latter half of the second century, for the youth Marcus Varenus Zmaragdus.
- Varena Marcella, dedicated a tomb at Rome, dating from the latter half of the second century, or the first half of the third, for her husband, the freedman Gaius Turranius Arianus, with whom she had lived for eleven years.
- Marcus Varenus Zmaragdus, a youth buried at Rome, aged thirteen years, six months, and twelve days, in a tomb dedicated by Varena Donata, dating from the latter half of the second century.
- Varenia Tecusa, dedicated a tomb at Rome, dating from the latter half of the second century, for her brother, Lucius Aelius Crispinus.
- Lucius Varenius (L. f.?), a soldier listed in an inscription from Rome, dating from AD 153.
- Marcus Varenus Polybius, made a libation in honour of Jupiter Optimus Maximus at Forum Livii in Aemilia Regio in AD 170. In 185, he and Varena Chrysidia made a libation to Juno Regina, also at Forum Livii.
- Publius Varenus Probus, one of the public curatores at Cures in Sabinum, along with Gaius Julius Felix, Manius Paccius Hermes, and Publius Postumius Zeuxippus, who participated in a libation and dedicatory offering in AD 173.
- Varena Chrysidia, along with Marcus Varenus Polybius, made a libation to Juno Regina at Forum Livii in AD 185.
- Titus Varenius Probus, an eques, and one of the duumvirs at Sarmizegetusa, buried along with his sister in a tomb dating from the late second century, dedicated by his colleague, the pontifex Marcus Cominius Quintus.
- Lucius Varenus Venustus, along with his daughter, Varena Prima, dedicated a tomb at Fulginiae, dating between the middle of the second and the middle of the third, for his son, Lucius Varenus Severus, a soldier in the eleventh urban cohort.
- Varena L. f. Prima, along with her father, Lucius Varenus Venustus, dedicated a tomb at Fulginiae, dating between the middle of the second century and the middle of the third, for her brother, Lucius Varenus Severus, a soldier in the eleventh urban cohort.
- Lucius Varenus L. f. Severus, a soldier in the eleventh Urban Cohort, was buried at Fulginiae, aged eighteen years, four months, and twelve days, in a tomb dating between the middle of the second century and the middle of the third, dedicated by his father, Lucius Varenus Venustus, and sister, Varena Prima.
- Varenia Diogenis, the wife of Gaius Salonius Theodotus, was buried at Portus in Latium, in a tomb built by her husband, dating from the first half of the third century.
- Varenius Taurus, the father of Varenius Lupus and Varenius Provincialis, known from a third-century funerary inscription from Lugdunum in Gaul.
- Varenius Lupus, the son of Taurus, was a young man buried at Lugdunum during the first half of the third century, aged twenty years, seven months, and fifteen days, in a tomb built by his brother, Varenius Provincialis.
- Varenius Provincialis, the son of Taurus, dedicated a tomb at Lugdunum, dating from the first half of the third century, for his brother, Varenius Lupus.
- Titus Varenius T. f. Pudens, an eques, was one of the decurions at Sarmizegetusa, and a patron of the neighboring towns of Apulum and Porolissum, according to a Severan-era inscription.
- Gaius Varenus Terminalis, a soldier in the fifth cohort of the vigiles at Rome in AD 205, serving in the century of Aulupor.
- Titus Varenius Gallicanus, an officer in the collegium fabrorum, or artisans' guild, at Sarmizegetusa, according to an inscription dating from the second quarter of the third century.
- Varenius Legitimus, together with Cornelius Trophimus, one of the municipal duumvirs of Laurentum and Lavinium in Latium in AD 227 or 228.
- Titus Varenius T. f. Sabinianus, an eques buried at Alba Julia in Dacia during the middle part of the third century, in a tomb built by his wife, Cornelia Lucilla, and sister, Varenia Probina, had been a soldier, decurion, and flamen at several towns in Dacia.
- Varena, dedicated a tomb at Rome, dating from the middle to late third century, for her daughter, Quinta Flavia Severina, aged two years, ten months, and seventeen days.
- Varena, named on a cinerarium found at the site of modern Sesto Calende, formerly part of Cisalpine Gaul, dating between the middle of the third and the end of the fourth century.

=== Undated Vareni ===
- Varena, mentioned in a funerary inscription from Vicus Fificulanus.
- Varena T. f., along with her sister, Severilla, and Symphorus, perhaps their freedman, made an offering at Augusta Praetoria in Cisalpine Gaul to the spirit of their father, Titus, and to Juno.
- Varenus, named in a sepulchral inscription from Rome.
- Varenus, a freedman of the emperor, was an adjutor tabelarii, or deputy accountant. He made a libation in honor of Apollo at Ostia.
- Varenus, named in an inscription from Nemausus in Gallia Narbonensis.
- Varenus, a centurion primus pilus named in an inscription from an uncertain province.
- Varenius, named in an inscription from the site of modern Gailhan, formerly part of Gallia Narbonensis.
- Publius Varenus, the former master of Primigenius, the son of Yimenaeus, a little boy buried at Rome, aged three years and four months.
- Varenia Agrippina, the wife of Lucius Arvianius Lentulus Festus, with whom she built a tomb at Rome for their son, Lucius Arvianius Justus Agrippinus, aged eight years, forty days.
- Varena P. l. Arescusa, a freedwoman buried at Florentia in Etruria, together with her fellow freedwoman, Rompenna Philas.
- Varenia Auge, buried at Nemausus, in a tomb built by her husband, Caesius Patroclus.
- Marcus Varenus Ɔ. l. Clemens, a freedman buried at Rome, in a family sepulchre built by the freedwoman Varena Fausta for her patron, Marcus Varenus Phileros and Marcus Canuleius Chrestus.
- Varena M. l. Fausta, a freedwoman, built a family sepulchre at Rome for her patron, Marcus Varenus Phileros, and the freedmen Marcus Varenus Clemens and Marcus Canuleius Chrestus.
- Marcus Varenus M. l. Faustus, a freedman named in a sepulchral inscription from Rome.
- Marcus Varenus Hermadio, supposedly a freedman, who with his conliberti Marcus Varenus Pasiphilus and Marcus Varenus Onesimus, dedicated a tomb at Rome for their patron, Marcus Varenus Macarianus. The inscription is thought to be a forgery.
- Marcus Varenus M. l. Gamus, a freedman buried in a family sepulchre at Rome, along with Tutilia Helena, Marcus Varenus Potitus, and Gaius Valerius Achilles.
- Marcus Varenus Graphicus, along with the freedwoman Vibia Hermione, perhaps his wife, dedicated a sepulchre at Rome for Vibia Quieta, former mistress of Hermione, and her two daughters, Veneria, aged seven years, ten months, and Helpis, aged twelve years, twenty-seven days.
- Varena or Varenia Longina, together with her daughter, Varena Harmonia, dedicated a tomb at Rome for her husband, Lucius Plotius Dio. Longina also built a tomb at Ostia for her daughter, Plotia Sabina, aged three years, two months.
- Varena L. f. Harmonia, the daughter of Lucius Plotius Dio and Varena Longina. She and her mother built a tomb at Rome for her father.
- Marcus Varenus Liberalis, named on a lead pipe found at Rome.
- Marcus Varenus Macarianus, supposed to have been buried at Rome in a tomb dedicated by his freedmen, Marcus Varenus Pasiphilus, Marcus Varenus Hermadio, and Marcus Varenus Onesimus. The inscription is thought to be a forgery.
- Marcus Varenus Onesimus, supposedly a freedman, who with his conliberti Marcus Varenus Hermadio and Marcus Varenus Pasiphilus, dedicated a tomb at Rome for their patron, Marcus Varenus Macarianus. The inscription is thought to be a forgery.
- Marcus Varenus Pasiphilus, supposedly a freedman, who with his conliberti Marcus Varenus Hermadio and Marcus Varenus Onesimus, dedicated a tomb at Rome for their patron, Marcus Varenus Macarianus. The inscription is thought to be a forgery.
- Marcus Varenus M. l. Phileros, a freedman buried at Rome, in a tomb dedicated by his client, the freedwoman Varena Fausta, for herself, Phileros, and the freedmen Marcus Varenus Clemens and Marcus Canuleius Chrestus.
- Marcus Varenus M. l. Potitus, a freedman buried in a family sepulchre at Rome, along with Marcus Varenus Gamus, Tutilia Helena, and Gaius Valerius Achilles.
- Varenia Primitiva, buried at Rome, in a sepulchre built by her husband, Gaius Baebius Evangelus, for himself and his family.
- Varenus Proculeianus, a centurion mentioned in an inscription from Bovium in Britannia.
- Titus Varenius Severus, the husband of Frontinia Servata, a woman buried at Nemausus, aged thirty-five years, seven months, and twelve days, in a tomb built by Varenius and her parents, Gaius Frontinius Servatus and Secundina, the daughter of Paternus.
- Marcus Varenius Valentinus, buried at Rome in a tomb build by his parents.
- Marcus Varenius Valentinus, buried at Castrimoenium in Latium, in a tomb built by his parents.
- Gaius Varenius Varus, guardian of the Roman settlers among the Osismi in Gallia Lugdunensis, dedicated a statue to Neptunus Hippius. The base of the statue with its inscription was found in 1948; the statue was found nearby in 2004.

== See also ==
- List of Roman gentes

== Bibliography ==
- Marcus Tullius Cicero, Fragmenta (ed. Orelli).
- Gaius Julius Caesar, Commentarii de Bello Gallico (Commentaries on the Gallic War).
- Marcus Fabius Quintilianus (Quintilian), Institutio Oratoria (Institutes of Oratory).
- Gaius Plinius Caecilius Secundus (Pliny the Younger), Epistulae (Letters).
- Wilhelm Drumann, Geschichte Roms in seinem Übergang von der republikanischen zur monarchischen Verfassung, oder: Pompeius, Caesar, Cicero und ihre Zeitgenossen, Königsberg (1834–1844).
- Dictionary of Greek and Roman Biography and Mythology, William Smith, ed., Little, Brown and Company, Boston (1849).
- Theodor Mommsen et alii, Corpus Inscriptionum Latinarum (The Body of Latin Inscriptions, abbreviated CIL), Berlin-Brandenburgische Akademie der Wissenschaften (1853–present).
- Bullettino della Commissione Archeologica Comunale in Roma (Bulletin of the Municipal Archaeological Commission of Rome, abbreviated BCAR), (1872–present).
- René Cagnat et alii, L'Année épigraphique (The Year in Epigraphy, abbreviated AE), Presses Universitaires de France (1888–present).
- George Davis Chase, "The Origin of Roman Praenomina", in Harvard Studies in Classical Philology, vol. VIII, pp. 103–184 (1897).
- Paul von Rohden, Elimar Klebs, & Hermann Dessau, Prosopographia Imperii Romani (The Prosopography of the Roman Empire, abbreviated PIR), Berlin (1898).
- Rendiconti Reale Istituto lombardo di scienze e lettere (Reports of the Royal Institute of Lombardy of Science and Letters, abbreviated RIL).
- Anna and Jaroslav Šašel, Inscriptiones Latinae quae in Iugoslavia inter annos MCMXL et MCMLX repertae et editae sunt (Inscriptions from Yugoslavia Found and Published between 1940 and 1960), Ljubljana (1963–1986).
- The Roman Inscriptions of Britain (abbreviated RIB), Oxford, (1990–present).
- Gian Luca Gregori, La collezione epigrafica dell'antiquarium comunale del Celio (The Epigraphic Collection of the Ancient Community of the Caelian Hill), Quasar, Rome (2001).
- Jean-Yves Éveillard, Yvan Maligorne, "Une statue de Neptune Hippius à Douarnenez (Finistère)", in Actes du Xe colloque international sur l'art provincial romain, Arles, pp. 557–563 (May 2007).
- Bollettino della reale Deputazione di Storia patria per l'Umbria (Bulletin of the Royal Deputation of the History of the Fatherland of Umbria, abbreviated BDSPU).
