= Gaius Petronius (consul 25) =

1st century Roman senator and consul

Gaius Petronius was a Roman senator, who was active during the Principate. He was suffect consul from September through December AD 25, succeeding Cossus Cornelius Lentulus. Bartolomeo Borghesi has argued that Gaius Petronius is the same person as Gaius Petronius Umbrinus, who is mentioned in an inscription from Rome as curator locorum publicorum iudicandorum.

Petronius was grandson of Publius Petronius Turpilianus, one of the tresviri monetalis, and probably grandson of Publius Petronius, prefect of Egypt. Publius Petronius, suffect consul in 19, was probably his older brother.

Political offices
Preceded by Cossus Cornelius Lentulus	Suffect consul of the Roman Empire; September–December 25 with Marcus Asinius Agrippa	Succeeded by Gn. Cornelius Lentulus Gaetulicus; G. Calvisius Sabinus
