= Chilieteris =

History of Rome written by Gaius Asinius Quadratus

The Chilieteris (Greek: Χιλιετηρίς, "The Millennium") was a history of Rome in fifteen books, written in Ionic Greek by Gaius Asinius Quadratus, which spanned a thousand years, from the founding of Rome until his time.

== History ==
The Chilieteris was written by Gaius Asinius Quadratus in the 3rd century AD, to celebrate the thousandth year since the founding of Rome. Quadratus, for the purpose of having the time period of a thousand years end in his own time, dates the founding of Rome at 776 BC. It was written in Ionic Greek, in 15 books. It was probably written during the reign of Philip the Arab; however, its account ends in the reign of Severus Alexander in 224/225.

== Style ==
The Chilieteris bears many stylistic similarities to the Historia Romana of Cassius Dio. Both were written in Ionian Greek, and both began at the founding of Rome, and ended in the reign of Alexander Severus.
