= Gnaeus Cornelius Lentulus Gaetulicus (consul 26) =

Roman senator, general and governor (died AD 39)

Gnaeus Cornelius Lentulus Gaetulicus (died AD 39) was a Roman senator and general. He was ordinary consul in the year 26 with Gaius Calvisius Sabinus as his colleague. Gaetulicus was involved in a plot against the emperor Caligula, and following its discovery he was executed.

== Family ==
Gaetulicus was the son of Cossus Cornelius Lentulus, consul in 1 BC; his siblings include Cossus Cornelius Lentulus, consul in 25, and Cornelia, the wife of his consular colleague Calvisius Sabinus. He is attested as having married Apronia, the daughter of Lucius Apronius, by whom he had one daughter and at least three sons: Gnaeus Cornelius Lentulus Gaetulicus, suffect consul in 55, Cossus Cornelius Lentulus Gaetulicus, and Decimus Junius Silanus Gaetulicus.

== Life ==
Ronald Syme describes the family of the Cornelii Lentuli as distinguished by "mediocrity and survival". However, Gaetulicus stands out from them, bringing "the Lentuli into fame and peril" with becoming a partisan of the praetorian prefect Sejanus. This was solidified by the betrothal of Gaetulicus' daughter to one of Sejanus' sons. The support of a Patrician was rewarded by the ambitious Sejanus, first with the consulate in the year 26, and later with the appointment of legatus pro praetore or governor of the imperial province of Germania Superior in the year 29, possibly in succession to his brother, Cossus Cornelius Lentulus.

With the fall and death of Sejanus in the year 31, not only was the family of the praetorian prefect killed but many of his supporters were either exiled or also murdered. Gaetulicus was prosecuted by a Senator who had achieved the office of aedile, Abudius Ruso, but the lawsuit boomeranged on Abudius and the delator was banished from Rome. Tacitus notes that Gaetulicus "alone of all connected with Sejanus lived in safety and in high favour." Gaetulicus was very secure in his post in Germania Superior: he was popular with his troops for his kindness and moderate discipline, while his father-in-law Apronius governed the adjacent province of Germania Inferior. Tacitus further mentions a rumor that Gaetulicus and the emperor Tiberius had come to an understanding: the governor had sent him a letter reminding the emperor that he had aligned himself with Sejanus at the emperor's advice, not his own choice, had no part in the affair that led to Sejanus' destruction, and would remain loyal as long as he was left undisturbed in Germania Superior.

Gaetulicus remained governor past the death of Tiberius into the reign of Caligula, when a misstep in the year 39 by the former brought him down. "The whole affair is mysterious, the evidence disconnected and fragmentary," writes Ronald Syme. Syme reviews the primary sources -- which include Suetonius and Dio Cassius -- and provides the essential facts. In September 39, Caligula left Rome and proceeded to Moguntiacum, the capital of Germania Superior, accompanied by his sisters and Lepidus. Upon reaching Moguntiacum, Gaetulicus was one of many executed, in his case because of his popularity with his soldiers. Lepidus was executed by a tribune, while Agrippina and Livilla were exiled to the Pontine Islands. On 27 October word of the nefaria consilia had reached Rome, when the Arval Brethren celebrated a thanksgiving for its suppression.

== Writings ==
Gaetulicus also had a literary bent. He wrote a history or set of memoirs that Suetonius used as a source for his De vita Caesarum and Tacitus his Annals. He is mentioned by name in Suetonius' Life of Caligula (Gaius) 8. His cognomen "Gaetulicus" appears on nine poems in the Greek Anthology, and Ronald Syme identifies this Gaetulicus as the author, although Syme admits that "some, it is true, are impelled to cast doubt on his authorship." He is known to have written some erotic verses, for Martial cites him as a precedent for the free use of language.

He also claimed that the tomb of Archilochus is continually haunted by wasps.

Political offices
Preceded by Gaius Petronius, and Marcus Asinius Agrippa	Consul of the Roman Empire; 26 with Gaius Calvisius Sabinus	Succeeded by Quintus Junius Blaesus, and Lucius Antistius Vetus as Suffect consuls
