= Gaius Asinius Rufus =

Roman senator

Gaius Asinius Rufus (c. 110 – after 136) was a notable in Lydia in 134 and 135 who became a Roman Senator in 136. He was probably the son of Gaius Asinius Frugi (born c. 80), monet. of Phrygia between 98 and 116.

He married Julia, daughter of A. Julius Claudius Charax (c. 115 – after 147), granddaughter of C. Julius Lupus T. Vibius Varus Laevillus (c. 95 – after 132) and wife Julia Quadratilla (born c. 100), and through her great-granddaughter of Gaius Julius Quadratus Bassus, suffect consul in 105, and wife Julia, Princess of Cilicia (born c. 80).

They had the following issue:

- Gaius Asinius Nicomachus (born c. 135), married to his cousin Julia Quadratilla (born c. 145) (or perhaps to Asinia Marcellina, descendant of the family of Gaius Asinius Pollio), parents of:
  - Gaius Asinius Rufus (born c. 160)
  - Gaius Asinius Protimus Quadratus (born c. 165), Proconsul of Achaea c. 211 or in 220
  - Gaius Julius Asinius Quadratus, married and had:
    - Gaius Asinius Quadratus, a Historian in 200

== Sources ==
- Anthony Wagner, Pedigree and Progress, Essays in the Genealogical Interpretation of History, London, Philmore, 1975. Rutgers Alex CS4.W33.
