= Servius Sulpicius Galba =

Servius Sulpicius Galba may refer to:

- Servius Sulpicius Galba (consul 144 BC)
- Servius Sulpicius Galba (consul 108 BC)
- Servius Sulpicius Galba (praetor 54 BC), assassin of Julius Caesar
- Galba, born Servius Sulpicius Galba, Roman emperor from AD 68 to 69

== See also ==
- Galba (cognomen)
- Sulpicius Severus
