= Servius Cornelius Dolabella Petronianus =

1st century AD Roman senator and consul

Servius Cornelius Dolabella Petronianus was a Roman senator in the latter part of the first century. As the colleague of the emperor Domitian, he was one of the eponymous consuls of AD 86.

== Family ==
Petronianus was the son of Petronia and one of the Cornelii Dolabellae. His mother had previously been married to Aulus Vitellius, the future emperor, while his father had been adopted by Servius Sulpicius Galba, whom Otho overthrew in AD 69, the "Year of the Four Emperors". Petronianus' father was put to death by Vitellius upon his accession.

There is considerable uncertainty about the identity of Petronianus' father. Suetonius, the only ancient historian to mention his praenomen, calls him Gnaeus, while the filiation of Servius Cornelius Dolabella Metilianus Pompeius Marcellus, consul suffectus in AD 113 and who is considered the likely son of Petronianus, is Ser. f. P. n. P. pronepos P. abnepos. If Petronianus was the father of Marcellus, then according to Marcellus' filiation Petronianus' father, grandfather, and great-grandfather would have been named Publius. Petronianus' father might then be the same Cornelius Dolabella who was consul suffectus in AD 55 or 56, and probably the same Cornelius Dolabella who had been inducted into a priestly college, probably the Salii Palatini, in 38 or 39; but this consul's praenomen is also uncertain; on the basis of Marcellus' filiation, some scholars infer that he was Publius, and that he was the father of Petronianus.

== See also ==
- Cornelia gens

== Bibliography ==
- Publius Cornelius Tacitus, Historiae.
- Gaius Suetonius Tranquillus, De Vita Caesarum (Lives of the Caesars, or The Twelve Caesars).
- Giuseppe Camodeca: "I consoli des 55–56 e un nuovo collega di seneca nel consolato: P. Cornelius Dolabella" (The Consuls of 55–56 and a New Colleague of Seneca in the Consulate: P. Cornelius Dolabella), in Zeitschrift für Papyrologie und Epigraphik, vol. 63, pp. 201–215 (1986).
- Paul A. Gallivan, "The Fasti for A.D. 70–96", in Classical Quarterly, vol. 31, pp. 186–220 (1981).
- John D. Grainger, Nerva and the Roman Succession Crisis of AD 96–99, Routledge, London (2003), ISBN 0-415-28917-3.
- Edmund Groag, Arthur Stein, Leiva Petersen, and Klaus Wachtel, Prosopographia Imperii Romani (The Prosopography of the Roman Empire, Second Edition, abbreviated PIR^{2}), Berlin (1933–2015).
- Theodor Mommsen et alii, Corpus Inscriptionum Latinarum (The Body of Latin Inscriptions, abbreviated CIL), Berlin-Brandenburgische Akademie der Wissenschaften (1853–present).
- Paul von Rohden, Elimar Klebs, and Hermann Dessau, Prosopographia Imperii Romani (The Prosopography of the Roman Empire, abbreviated PIR), Berlin (1898).
- Dictionary of Greek and Roman Biography and Mythology, William Smith, ed., Little, Brown and Company, Boston (1849).
- Patrick Tansey, "The Perils of Prosopography: The Case of the Cornelii Dolabellae", in Zeitschrift für Papyrologie und Epigraphik, vol. 130, pp. 265–271 (2000).

Political offices
Preceded by Gaius Salvius Liberalis Nonius Bassus, and Cornelius Orestes as suffect consuls	Consul of the Roman Empire; 86 with Domitian XII, followed by Gaius Secius Campanus	Succeeded by ignotus, and Quintus Vibius Secundus as suffect consuls
