= Cossus Cornelius Lentulus (consul 25) =

1st century AD Roman senator and consul

Cossus Cornelius Lentulus was a Roman senator, who was active during the reign of Tiberius. He was consul in the year AD 25 as the colleague of Marcus Asinius Agrippa. Except for his consulship, the only office Lentulus might have held is governorship of Germania Superior, as Edmund Groag conjectured.

Lentulus was the son of Cossus Cornelius Lentulus Gaetulicus, consul in 1 BC. His brother was Gnaeus Cornelius Lentulus Gaetulicus, consul in the year 26. He is known to have a son, Cossus Cornelius Lentulus, consul in the year 60, as the colleague of Nero.

Political offices
Preceded by G. Calpurnius Aviola; P. Cornelius Lentulus Scipio as suffecti	Consul of the Roman Empire; January–August 25 with Marcus Asinius Agrippa	Succeeded by Gaius Petronius as suffectus
