= Gaius Calpurnius Aviola =

1st century Roman senator and consul suffectus

Gaius Calpurnius Acilius Aviola was a senator of the Roman Empire. He was suffect consul in AD 24 with Publius Cornelius Lentulus Scipio as his colleague. Aviola is also recorded as being governor of Asia in 37/38. Aviola has been identified as the father of Manius Acilius Aviola, consul in 54.

Based on Aviola's name, Ronald Syme argues that he was "presumably an Acilius Aviola adopted by a C. Calpurnius Piso"; Olli Salomies disagrees, believing the adoptive parent was a "C. Calpurnius without a cognomen (e.g. a son of C. Calpurnius, curule and plebeian aedile in 23 BC)". Yet both identify this man as the praetorian legate or governor of Gallia Lugdunensis in AD 21, who suppressed a revolt by the Andecavi in Gaul. Syme notes that "praetorian governorships tend to proceed to the consulate", yet this Acilius Aviola vanishes from history soon after; unless he had died prematurely after his governorship, it would make sense that upon being adopted by a Gaius Calpurnius Piso he changed his name and continued his career under it.

If they are identical, then Aviola is the subject of a tale recorded by Pliny the Elder and Valerius Maximus. Assumed to be dead, his body was set on top of a funeral pyre, which was then lit. Whereupon he is said to have come to life again, but due to the intensity of the flames, Aviola could not be rescued, and burned to death. This must have occurred prior to the death of Tiberius in AD 37, since Valerius Maximus published his work during that emperor's reign.

Political offices
Preceded by Servius Cornelius Cethegus, and Lucius Visellius Varro as Ordinary consuls	Suffect consul of the Roman Empire; 24 with Publius Cornelius Lentulus Scipio	Succeeded by Cossus Cornelius Lentulus, and Marcus Asinius Agrippa as Ordinary consuls
