= Gaius Visellius Varro =

Gaius Visellius Varro was a Roman senator, who was active during the reign of Augustus. He was suffect consul in the second half of AD 12, replacing Gaius Fonteius Capito. He was governor of Germania Inferior in the year 21.

Varro was the son of Gaius Visellius Varro, curule aedile. Although the name of his wife is not recorded, he is known as the father of Lucius Visellius Varro, consul in the year 24.

During his tenure as governor of Germania Inferior, a faction of Treveri, led by Julius Florus and allied with the Aeduan Julius Sacrovir, led a rebellion of Gaulish debtors against the Romans. Varro and Gaius Silius, then governor of Germania Superior, quarreled over who would lead the campaign to crush the rebellion, but as Varro was old and infirm, he yielded to Silius. This would serve as the pretext for Varro's son prosecuting Silius for being complicit in Sacrovir's revolt, and misappropriating money from the provincial government in Gaul, which ended with Silius' death.

Political offices
Preceded by Gaius Fonteius Capito as ordinary consuls	Suffect consul of the Roman Empire; 12 with Germanicus Julius Caesar	Succeeded by Gaius Silius, and Lucius Munatius Plancus as ordinary consuls
