= Gaius Clodius Crispinus =

Roman consul 113 AD

Gaius Clodius Crispinus was a Roman politician and senator in the 2nd century AD.

== Biography ==
He came from the gens Vettia. He was the son of Marcus Vettius Bolanus, consul in 66 AD, and Pontia, of the gens Petronia. He had a twin brother, Marcus Vettius Bolanus, consul in 111 AD. It is believed he was adopted by a member of the gens Claudia, whence the name.

Crispinus began his political career during the Flavian dynasty. Under Emperor Domitian, he joined the Roman Senate, where he was until the reign of Emperor Trajan. He was known for his patronage of the poet Statius. Around 93 AD, his mother tried to poison him and his brother, failing and committing suicide shortly after. In 113 AD, he became consul together with Lucius Publilius Celsus as his colleague.
