= Marcus Vettius Bolanus (consul 111) =

Roman consul ordinarius in 111

Marcus Vettius Bolanus was a Roman senator active during the reign of Trajan. He was eponymous consul for AD 111 as the colleague of Gaius Calpurnius Piso. He is thought to have been the son of Marcus Vettius Bolanus, consul in 66. The poet Statius mentions his brother Crispinus.

Political offices
Preceded by Aulus Larcius Priscus, and Sextus Marcius Honoratus as suffect consuls	Consul of the Roman Empire; 111 with Gaius Calpurnius Piso	Succeeded by Titus Avidius Quietus, and Lucius Eggius Marullus as suffect consuls
