= Herius Asinius =

1st-century BC Marrucini military commander against Rome

Herius Asinius, of Teate, was the commander of the Marrucini in the Marsic War. He fell in battle against Gaius Marius in 90 BC. He may have been the grandfather of Gaius Asinius Pollio, consul in 40 BC, and the ancestor of many, if not all of the members of the gens Asinia who later made their mark on Roman history.

== See also ==
- Asinia gens
