= Gaius Asinius Nicomachus Julianus =

Proconsul of Asia between 225 and 230

Gaius Asinius Nicomachus Julianus (c. 185 – aft. or c. 230) was the Proconsul of Asia between c. 225 and c. 230. He was the son of Gaius Asinius Protimus Quadratus, Proconsul in Achaea in 220.

He married Caesonia and was the father of Asinia Juliana Nicomacha (born ca 215), who married before 240 Quintus Anicius Faustus (born ca 210), son of Quintus Anicius Faustus Paulinus, Legate of Moesia Inferior between 229 and 230.
