= Publius Cornelius Lentulus Scipio =

1st century AD Roman senator, consul and provincial governor (c.15 BC - 52 AD)

Publius Cornelius Lentulus Scipio (c. 15 BC – 52 AD) was a Roman senator active during the Principate. He was suffect consul in the nundinium of July-December AD 24, as the colleague of Gaius Calpurnius Aviola. His name combines the two most famous branches of the gens Cornelia, the Lentuli and the Scipiones.

== Life ==
Scipio was the son of the identically named suffect consul of AD 2, Publius Cornelius Cn.f. Cn.f. Lentulus Scipio. A dedication erected at Brixia provides details of his career up to his consulate. His first attested office was praetor, which was followed as one of the two prefects (called praetores before 44 AD) of the aerarium Saturni in the year 15. He was legatus legionis or commander of Legio IX Hispana while it was stationed in Africa; Tacitus mentions Scipio participating in the successful campaign of Quintus Junius Blaesus, proconsular governor of Africa, against Tacfarinas, and provides the year of Scipio's commission as AD 22. Syme writes his commission makes him "notable, and seems anomalous, being the earliest nobilis registered in command of a legion when praetorian rank." The dedication at Brixia also attests that he was admitted to the College of Pontiffs, the highest-ranking priests of Rome.

The next office Scipio is known to have held was after his consulate, as proconsular governor of Asia. There is a difference in opinion as to when he held this office. A standard authority, the Prosopographia Imperii Romani, dates Scipio's tenure to 36/37, based on seniority: his predecessor, Marcus Aurelius Cotta Messalinus, was consul in 20, while Gaius Calpurnius Aviola, his attested successor, was consul the same year as Scipio. However, Syme points to an inscription discovered in Lydia which indicates the date 41/2; thus three men who achieved the rank of consul after Scipio became governor of Asia before him. "The wide variations in consular seniority will duly be noted," writes Syme, "as conveying the caprice of the Caesars or the influence of their ministers."

== Family ==
Scipio is known to have married twice. Evidence for the name of his first wife has not yet been recovered, but she was the mother of his oldest son, Publius Cornelius Scipio, suffect consul in 56. His second wife was the beautiful Poppaea Sabina the Elder. They had a son, Publius Cornelius Scipio Asiaticus, suffect consul in 68; his agnomen reflects Scipio's tenure as governor of Asia.

Poppaea Sabina had a reputation for promiscuity. Messalina, empress and wife of Claudius, suspected Poppaea had been the lover of Decimus Valerius Asiaticus; she had Publius Suillius Rufus prosecute her and Valerius Asiaticus. Messalina went as far as to hire agents to force Poppaea to commit suicide; Poppaea died in the year 47. A few days after her death, while dining with Scipio, the emperor Claudius absent-mindedly asked Scipio where his wife was; the widower replied simply that Poppaea "had paid the debt of nature." Another anecdote Tacitus records of Scipio and his second wife also took place after her death. Called on in the Senate for his opinion about Poppaea, he replied, "As I think what all men think about the deeds of Poppaea, suppose me to say what all men say."

Political offices
Preceded by Servius Cornelius Cethegus, and Lucius Visellius Varro as Ordinary consuls	Suffect consul of the Roman Empire; 24 with Gaius Calpurnius Aviola	Succeeded by Cossus Cornelius Lentulus, and Marcus Asinius Agrippa as Ordinary consuls
