= Servius Cornelius Cethegus =

Roman senator and consul active during the reign of Tiberius

Servius Cornelius Cethegus was a Roman senator active during the reign of Tiberius. He was consul ordinarius in AD 24, together with Lucius Visellius Varro.

According to his filiation in Dio Cassius, his father was also named Servius. Edmund Groag notes that the identification of Cethegus' father with one Cornelius Lentulus Cethegus, who erected a monument to his nutrix, "cannot be excluded"; this would connect him to the family of the Cornelii Lentuli, one of the last surviving branches of the gens Cornelia. Ronald Syme also attempts to fit him in the Cornelii Lentuli, but admits the praenomen Servius was last used by them in the mid-second century BC.

An inscription at Haydrah in modern Tunisia attests that Cethegus was proconsular governor of Africa; his tenure in that post has been dated towards the end of Tiberius' reign.

== See also ==
- Cornelia gens

Political offices
Preceded by Gaius Asinius Pollio, and Gaius Stertinius Maximus	Ordinary consul of the Roman Empire; 24 with Lucius Visellius Varro	Succeeded by Gaius Calpurnius Aviola, and Publius Cornelius Lentulus Scipio as Suffect consuls
