= Gaius Asinius Frugi =

Roman official moneyer (born c. 80 AD)

Gaius Asinius Frugi (born c. 80), was a Roman moneyer who was officially permitted to mint money for use in Phrygia between 98 and 116. He was probably a descendant of Nicomachus (c. 30 BC - aft. 1 BC), a notable of Lydia in 1 BC.

He married and probably was the father of Gaius Asinius Rufus (c. 110 - after 136), who was also a notable in Lydia in 134 and 135 and became a Roman Senator in 136, and who married Julia, daughter of A. Julius Claudius Charax (c. 115 - after 147), granddaughter of G. Julius Lupus T. Vibius Varus Laevillus (c. 95 - after 132) and wife Julia Quadratilla (born c. 100), and through her great-granddaughter of Gaius Julius Quadratus Bassus, suffect consul in 105, and wife Julia, Princess of Cilicia (born c. 80), and had issue.

== Sources ==
- Christian Settipani, Continuite Gentilice et Continuite Familiale Dans Les Familles Senatoriales Romaines, A L'Epoque Imperiale, Mythe et Realite. Linacre, UK: Prosopographica et Genealogica, 2000. ILL. NYPL ASY (Rome) 03-983.
