= Vigiles =

Watchmen of ancient Rome

Vigiles or more properly the Vigiles Urbani ("watchmen of the City") or Cohortes Vigilum ("cohorts of the watchmen") were the firefighters and police of ancient Rome.

== History ==
The triumviri nocturni (meaning three men of the night) were the first men, being privately owned slaves, organized into a group that combatted the common problems of fire and conflagrations in Rome. Another organization dedicated to fighting fires in ancient Rome was a band of slaves led by the aedile Marcus Egnatius Rufus. The privately operated system became ineffective, so in the interest of keeping himself and Rome safe, Augustus instituted a new public firefighting force called the vigiles. Augustus modelled the new firefighters after the fire brigade of Alexandria, Egypt. The vigiles were also known by their nickname "Sparteoli" or "little bucket fellows", given to them because of the buckets they carried water in, which were made of rope sealed with pitch.

In AD 6, Augustus levied a 4% tax on the sale of slaves and used the proceeds to set up the new force. The first units of vigiles were under the command of the aediles and the vicomagistri. There were only 6,000 vigiles and they were initially all recruited from slaves. By 22 AD the vigiles were near entirely made up of freedmen and were commanded by the praefectus vigilum, who was of equestrian rank. The force was divided into seven cohorts, each commanded by a tribune. Commonly tribunes would begin their career by commanding a unit of the Vigiles. Each cohort was divided into seven centuries, each of 70–80 men commanded by a centurion. Each cohort patrolled two of the city's fourteen administrative regiones. The cohorts were doubled in size in AD 205.

The vigiles also acted as a night watch, keeping an eye out for burglars and hunting down runaway slaves, and were on occasion used to maintain order in the streets. Their most famous prefect, Naevius Sutorius Macro, succeeded Lucius Aelius Sejanus as Prefect of the Praetorian Guard after his men had been used by the Emperor Tiberius to retake control of the city from Sejanus's soldiers.

Vigiles were stationed at the harbour cities of Ostia and Portus. A vexillatio (detachment) of four centuries was detached from Rome for four months at a time, with two centuries being stationed at each city.

During the Great Fire of Rome, the vigiles took to looting the city rather than enforcing law and fighting the fires.

The vigiles appear to have lost their status as an independent unit and come under the authority of the Praetorian prefects sometime in the early 3rd century.

== Organization ==
In the beginning, the corps had difficulty recruiting men. In an effort to entice men to enlist the Lex Visellia was passed in 24 AD, granting full citizenship and a bonus cash stipend to Vigiles after six years of service. By the 2nd century, citizens were also allowed to enlist.

The Vigiles were accommodated in barracks and patrolled the streets, especially at night, on the lookout for any unsupervised fires. Every householder was obliged to keep equipment for fighting fires, and the men themselves were equipped with pumps, buckets, hooks (for pulling down burning material), picks, mattocks and axes. They also used ballistae for knocking down burning houses and creating firebreaks. They even had their own medical support (medici), with four doctors attached to each cohort, and their own chaplains (victimarii). A siphonarius operated a pump and an aquarius supervised the supply of water. The ordinary firefighters were called milites (soldiers).

The Vigiles were organized into seven cohorts each 1,000 men strong. The cohorts contained seven centuries. The centuries were commanded by centurions, and the cohort was commanded by a tribune. The commander of the Vigiles was the Praefectus Vigilum. The centurions of the Vigiles would often go on to become centurions in the Urban Cohorts, followed by becoming a centurion in the Praetorian Guard. They would then transfer to the Legions, where they could reach the rank of Primus Pilus. The prefect was also known as the Prefect of the Watch. The prefect was an eques appointed by the emperor to command the seven cohorts. It was not a particularly sought after office until the 3rd century. Prominent jurists with a legal background began serving as Prefect to fulfil the magisterial capacity of the office. As a judge, the Prefect made rulings in his court for the common thieves caught during the night. Eventually, the Prefect was given jurisdiction over daytime petty crimes as well. According to Justinian, in the event of more serious crimes the decision was made by the praefectus urbi, "if the offender is a person of such thuggish and infamous character ... the case is sent on to the prefect of the city". Often times Praefectus Vigilum would go on to be prefects of the Praetorian Guard.

Beyond the office of the prefect, the Vigiles were ordered by rank similar to the military. While some terms of service could extend beyond twenty years, most commissioned ranks were much shorter. Since the Vigiles never achieved the prestige of the Praetorian Guard or the Urban Cohorts, serving in the corps was usually only a means of achieving more honourable and lucrative posts.

One known praefectus, Placidianus was put in charge of an expeditionary force sent to Gaul by Claudius II (Gothicus) on his accession in 269 AD to secure the lower Rhone valley against the so-called Gallic Empire. This is the only known instance of the holder of this office being given a substantive command outside Rome. Whether or not his force included vigiles from the city is uncertain.

Whether or not the Praefectus Vigilum had his headquarters in any of the stationes identified above or whether he had an entirely separate praefectura is not known. If he is associated with one of the barracks it is likely to have been that of I Cohort in the Via Lata.

== Duties ==
=== Fighting fires ===
Every cohort was equipped with standard firefighting equipment. The sipho or fire engine was pulled by horses and consisted of a large double action pump that was partially submerged in a reservoir of water. The Vigiles designated as aquarii needed to have an accurate knowledge of where water was located, and they also formed bucket brigades to bring water to the fire. Attempts were made to smother the fire by covering it with patchwork quilts (centones) soaked with water. There is even evidence that chemical firefighting methods were used by throwing a vinegar based substance called acetum into fires. In many cases the best way to prevent the spread of flames was to tear down the burning building with hooks and levers. For fires in multiple story buildings, cushions and mattresses were spread out on the ground for people to jump onto from the upper levels.

A major duty of the Vigiles was to enforce preventative measures against conflagrations. Adequate fire fighting equipment was required in every home. The Digest of Justinian decrees that Vigiles are "ordered to remind every one to have a supply of water ready in his upper room". While the Vigiles only had advising authority, their recommendations were often followed to avoid repercussions for negligence. Corporal punishment was the most common punishment for negligence according to the Digest of Justinian, "where persons have paid insufficient attention to their fire, the prefect ... orders them to be beaten".

During the Great Fire of Rome in AD 64 over one third of Rome was destroyed by flames. The young Emperor Nero helped to direct the Vigiles in fighting the flames. It was rumoured that the Vigiles intentionally allowed the city to burn under orders from Nero, who later built his palace on land that was cleared by the fire. Regardless, Nero enacted fire code laws following the Great Fire to avoid further conflagrations. These laws called for more public access to water and prohibited buildings from sharing a common wall.

=== Police force ===
Starting about 27 BC, Augustus added a police function to the Vigiles to counterbalance the urban mobs that had run rampant during the latter days of the Republic.

In addition to extinguishing fires, the Vigiles were the nightwatch of Rome. Their duties included apprehending thieves and robbers and capturing runaway slaves. The task of guarding the baths was added as a duty of the Vigiles during the reign of Alexander Severus when the baths remained open during the night. They dealt primarily with petty crimes and looked for disturbances of the peace while they patrolled the streets. Sedition, riots and violent crimes were handled by the Cohortes urbanae and (to a lesser extent) the Praetorian Guard, though Vigiles could provide a supporting role in these situations. The Vigiles were not considered a para-military unit.

=== Quarters ===
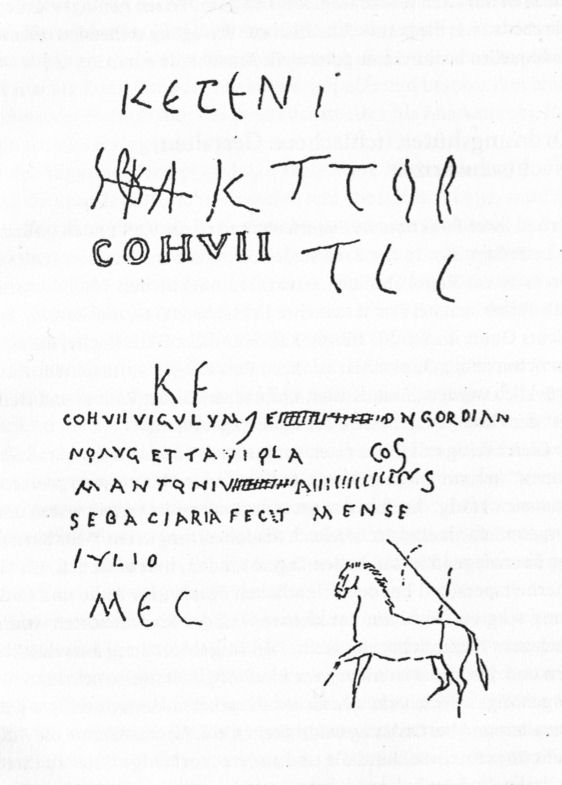
Graffiti from wardroom of 7th Cohort

The first Vigiles sequestered private homes and buildings to use as their command posts. It was not until the mid-2nd century that official stations were built explicitly for the Vigiles' use. By the early 3rd century sub-stations (excubitoria), which held forty to fifty men, were constructed to accommodate the expanding city and the surrounding suburbs.

The locations of four of the seven cohort stationes or barracks have been fairly definitively identified:

- I Cohort: On the east side of the Via Lata opposite the Saepta;
- III Cohort: On Viminal;
- IV Cohort: Near Baths of Caracalla;
- V Cohort: On Caelian Hill near present site of S. Maria in Domnica.

The VII Cohort was probably housed in a statio provisionally identified near the Aemilian Bridge.

As mentioned elsewhere detachments of watchmen were stationed at Ostia and Portus and there were sub-stations throughout the city. What arrangements were made for policing the outer suburbs of the city is not known. (Certainly after the governmental reforms of Diocletian the jurisdiction of the Praefectus Urbi extended as far as the east coast and for 100 miles (160 km) in every direction. This might suggest that his subordinate, the Praefectus Vigilum, had a commensurate responsibility.)

== In popular culture ==
The Vigiles often play a prominent role in the Marcus Didius Falco novels of Lindsey Davis, providing assistance in Falco's investigations. In particular, Falco's old army friend Lucius Petronius Longus is a 'Watch Captain' in Regio XIII.

In Death in Vesunna by Harry Turtledove, the vigiles of Vesunna, Roman Gaul (now modern Périgueux, France) are tasked to hunt down two murderers from the future, whose victim was a prominent citizen in the city whom they murdered with a pistol. Despite initial bafflement, the head of the vigiles is able to solve the case with help from his Greek doctor friend and arrest the murderers despite their previously unknown weapon.

== See also ==
- Cohortes urbanae
- History of firefighting
- List of fire departments
- List of Roman army unit types
- Praetorian Guard
- Vigili del Fuoco
