= Gaius Asinius Protimus Quadratus =

Roman senator and governor during the Severan dynasty

Gaius Asinius Protimus Quadratus was a Roman senator, who was active during the Severan dynasty. He is known entirely from inscriptions.

Quadratus was proconsular governor of Achaea between 192 and 211; while governing Achaea, Quadratus was designated suffect consul for a nundinium during the following year.

He was the brother of Gaius Asinius Rufus, son of Gaius Asinius Nicomachus and wife and cousin Julia Quadratilla (or perhaps Asinia Marcellina, descendant of the family of Gaius Asinius Pollio) and paternal grandson of Gaius Asinius Rufus and wife Julia.

His children included Gaius Asinius Nicomachus Julianus, proconsular governor of Asia at some point during the reign of Severus Alexander.
