= Gaius Silius (consul) =

Early 1st century AD Roman general and consul

Gaius Silius (died AD 24) was a Roman senator who achieved successes as a general over German barbarians following the disaster of the Battle of the Teutoburg Forest. For this achievement he was appointed consul in AD 13 with Lucius Munatius Plancus as his colleague. However, years later Silius became entangled in machinations of the ambitious Praetorian prefect Sejanus and was forced to commit suicide.

Due to an ambiguity in the Fasti Capitolini, experts such as Mommsen and Attilio Degrassi believed Silius' full name was Gaius Silius Aulus Caecina Largus. However, Arthur and Joyce Gordon pointed out that the form of this name, known as polyonymy, was unusual, preceding any other known example by fifty years, and suggested, based on admittedly less reliable sources, that this entry was more accurately read as two names: Gaius Silius, and Aulus Caecina Largus, the latter an otherwise unknown senator. Although this reading was endorsed by Ronald Syme, it was considered as only a possibility until Diana Gorostidi Pi showed an inscription she called Fasti consulares Tusculani proved these were two distinct individuals.

== Biography ==
Silius was probably a son of Publius Silius Nerva. In AD 13, Silius was elected consul alongside Lucius Munatius Plancus. At the end of his tenure in office, he was appointed imperial legate of Germania Superior, under the overall command of Germanicus, and was the officer in charge of the four upper Rhine legions which did not mutiny upon the death of the emperor Augustus. Once the mutiny was suppressed, Silius continued to serve loyally under Germanicus, participating in the Roman retaliation campaign (between AD 14 and 16) against a Germanic alliance in the aftermath of the disaster at the Battle of the Teutoburg Forest. His successes earned him an honorary triumph in AD 15.

The following year, Germanicus sent Silius against the Chatti with 30,000 infantry and 3,000 cavalry, defeating them in the process, after which Tiberius appointed him as a taxation auditor in Gaul. He continued in his role as governor of Upper Germany until 21, during which year he suppressed a revolt in Gaul. A faction of Treveri, led by Julius Florus and allied with the Aeduan Julius Sacrovir, led a rebellion of Gaulish debtors against the Romans. With two legions Silius defeated Sacrovir's rebel forces (numbering 40,000), twelve miles outside of Augustodunum.

Upon his return to Rome later that same year, Silius was soon caught in the political machinations at court as part of Germanicus' faction. Through Silius's wife, Sosia Galla, the couple had become friends with Tiberius’ daughter-in-law Agrippina the Elder. Due to their friendship with Agrippina they became innocent victims of Sejanus' schemes. In the Senate, Lucius Visellius Varro (consul in 24) accused Silius of being complicit in Sacrovir's revolt, and of misappropriating money from the provincial government in Gaul. Refusing to submit a plea or to defend himself, Silius declared that had he not personally kept the legions on the Rhine from avenging the murder of Germanicus, Tiberius would have lost his position as Princeps. Faced with false witnesses swearing that he had robbed the Gallic provinces, Silius committed suicide in 24, and afterwards Galla was exiled. Galla's property was confiscated by the Senate and a portion was given to her children.

Silius had at least one son, also named Gaius Silius.

He may have owned the cups from Hoby treasure.

== See also ==
- List of Roman consuls

== Sources ==
- Smith, William, Dictionary of Greek and Roman Biography and Mythology, Vol III (1849).

Political offices
Preceded by Germanicus Julius Caesar, and Gaius Visellius Varro	Consul of the Roman Empire; 13 with Lucius Munatius Plancus	Succeeded by Aulus Caecina Largus as Suffect consul
