= Marcus Asinius Agrippa =

1st-century BC Roman senator and consul

Marcus Asinius Agrippa was a Roman senator, who was active during the Principate. He was consul in AD 25 as the colleague of first Cossus Cornelius Lentulus, then of Gaius Petronius. Agrippa died at the end of the following year (26). According to Tacitus, Agrippa was descended from a family more illustrious than ancient, and did not disgrace it by his mode of life, although he mentions no specifics.

Agrippa was the half-brother of Drusus Julius Caesar, the natural son of the Emperor Tiberius. He was the grandson of Gaius Asinius Pollio, the second son of Gaius Asinius Gallus and Vipsania Agrippina (after Gaius Asinius Pollio) Paul von Rohden speculates that he may have been the father of Marcus Asinius Marcellus, consul in 54.

== See also ==
- Agrippa (disambiguation), for other people with this name

Political offices
Preceded by Gaius Calpurnius Aviola, and Publius Cornelius Lentulus Scipio as Suffect consuls	Consul of the Roman Empire; 25 with Cossus Cornelius Lentulus, followed by Gaius Petronius	Succeeded by Gnaeus Cornelius Lentulus Gaetulicus, and Gaius Calvisius Sabinus as Ordinary consuls
