= Gaius Asinius Pollio (consul 23) =

1st-century AD senator and consul of the Roman Empire

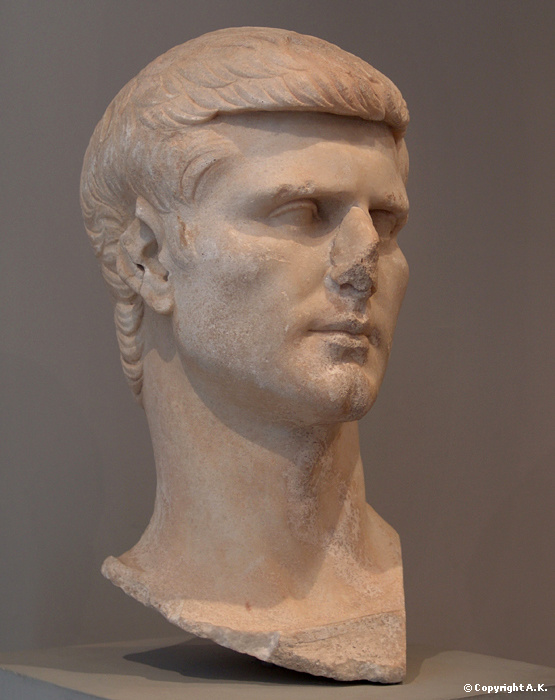
Statue of Gaius Asinius Pollio

Gaius Asinius Pollio (fl. AD 23 — d. 45) was a Roman senator and orator active during the Principate. He was ordinary consul for 23 with Gaius Antistius Vetus as his colleague. He was the oldest son of Gaius Asinius Gallus; his brother was Marcus Asinius Agrippa, consul in 25. Pollio's mother was Vipsania Agrippina. Through her, he was the half-brother of the younger Drusus.

We know from his coins Pollio was proconsular governor of Asia. In 45, Pollio was exiled as an accuser of a conspiracy and later was put to death on orders from Empress Valeria Messalina.

The Asinia Pollionis filia mentioned on an inscription from Tusculum may have been his daughter. Pollio was perhaps the father (or brother) of Gaius Asinius Placentinus who lived around the middle of the 1st century.

== See also ==
- Gaius Asinius Pollio, his grandfather, the 1st-century BC consul and historian

== Notes ==
Political offices
Preceded by Decimus Haterius Agrippa, and Gaius Sulpicius Galba	Consul of the Roman Empire; 23 with Gaius Antistius Vetus, followed by Gaius Stertinius Maximus	Succeeded by Servius Cornelius Cethegus, and Lucius Visellius Varro
