= Stertinia gens =

Ancient Roman family

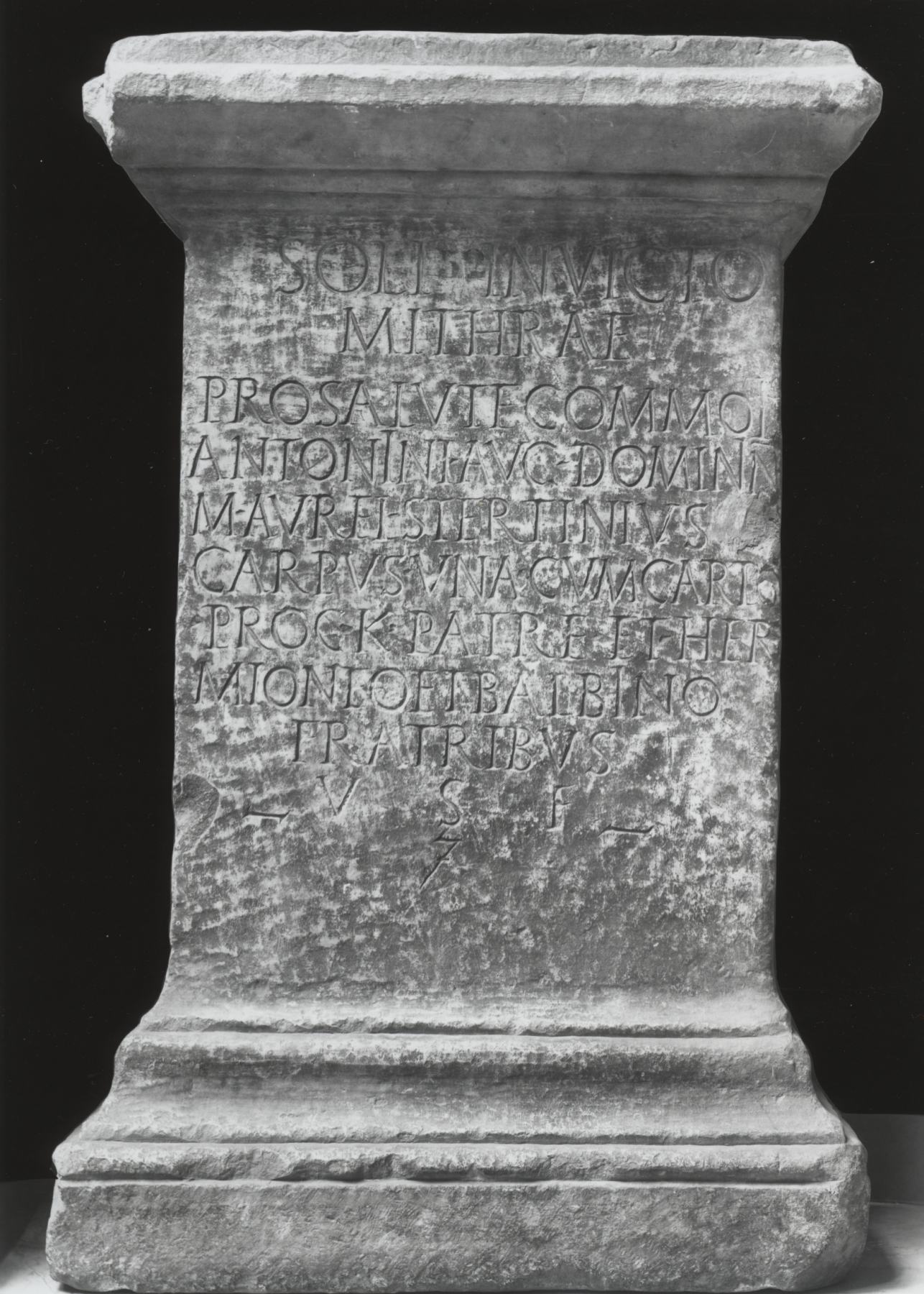
A marble monument dedicated to Sol Invictus by Marcus Aurelius Stertinius, procurator of the camp, and two of his brothers-in-arms. Probably third century; from the collection of the Walters Art Museum.

The gens Stertinia was a plebeian family of ancient Rome. It first rose to prominence at the time of the Second Punic War, and although none of its members attained the consulship in the time of the Republic, a number of Stertinii were so honoured in the course of the first two centuries of the Empire.

== Praenomina ==
The main praenomina used by the Stertinii were Lucius, Gaius, and Marcus, the three most common of all praenomina. There are also instances of Quintus and Publius, which likewise were very common names.

== Columbarium of the Stertinii ==
Along the Via Labicana is the Columbarium of the Stertinii, a tomb discovered in 1912, containing various Stertinii, and members of their household, including freedmen and their wives. The tomb had a capacity of at least one hundred and sixty niche burials, organized in a grid, each containing a cinerary urn. Beneath many of the niches were inscriptions identifying their occupants, freeborn Stertinii as well as their liberti, often buried side by side.

== Members ==
This list includes abbreviated praenomina. For an explanation of this practice, see filiation.

- Lucius Stertinius, proconsul in Hispania Ulterior in 199 BC. He returned in 196, and was appointed one of ten commissioners sent with Titus Quinctius Flamininus to settle the affairs of Greece following the Second Macedonian War. He brought fifty thousand pounds of silver from Spain, with which he erected two arches topped with gilt statues in the Forum Boarium, and a third in the Circus Maximus.
- Gaius Stertinius, praetor in 188 BC, received the province of Sardinia.
- Lucius Stertinius, quaestor in 168 BC.
- Stertinius, a stoic philosopher, humorously described by Horace as the eighth of the Seven Sages.
- Lucius Stertinius, the legate of Germanicus, defeated the Bructeri in AD 15, and recovered the standard of the nineteenth legion, lost by Publius Quinctilius Varus in the Battle of Teutoburg Forest. He then received the surrender of Segimerus, the brother of Segestes, and the following year defeated the Angrivarii, obtaining their submission.
- Marcus Stertinius, father of Gaius Stertinius Maximus, the consul of AD 23.
- Stertinius Maximus, a rhetorician mentioned by Seneca the Elder, perhaps the same as the consul of AD 23.
- Gaius Stertinius M. f. Maximus, consul suffectus in AD 23.
- Gaius Stertinius C. l. Orpex, a freedman of the consul Stertinius Maximus, was a scribe and secretary. He was buried at Ephesus in Asia, together with his wife, Stertinia Quieta, and three young children: Gaius Stertinius Marinus, Gaius Stertinius Asiaticus, and Stertinia Prisca.
- Stertinia C. l. Quieta, freedwoman of the consul Gaius Stertinius Maximus, and wife of Gaius Stertinius Orpex, her conlibertus, with whom she was buried at Ephesus.
- Gaius Stertinius C. f. Marinus, son of Gaius Stertinius Orpex and Stertinia Quieta, buried with his parents at Ephesus, age eight.
- Gaius Stertinius C. f. Asiaticus, son of Gaius Stertinius Orpex and Stertinia Quieta, buried with his parents at Ephesus, age three.
- Stertinia C. f. Prisca, daughter of Gaius Stertinius Orpex and Stertinia Quieta, buried with her parents at Ephesus, age eight.
- Stertinia C. f. Maria, the daughter of Stertinius Orpex.
- Quintus Stertinius, a Roman physician in the time of Claudius. He and his brother were retained by the emperor for the sum of five hundred thousand sestertii per annum, less than they might have received in private practice, with which they helped beautify the city of Neapolis. Pliny describes their accumulated fortune as thirty million sestertii.
- Gaius Stertinius Xenophon, the brother of Quintus, was suspected of having poisoned Claudius. He died the same year, although whether he perished as a result of the belief in his guilt, or coincidentally, is unclear.
- Marcus Stertinius Rufus, father of Marcus Stertinius Rufus, the councilor.
- Marcus Stertinius M. f. Rufus, served on the council of Lucius Helvius Agrippa, proconsul of Sardinia in AD 69.
- Lucius Stertinius Avitus, consul suffectus ex kal. Mai. in AD 92, under the emperor Domitian, apparently the same praised by Martial in the ninth book of his Epigrams.
- Publius Stertinius Quartus, consul suffectus in AD 112, and afterward proconsul of Asia.
- Lucius Stertinius Noricus, consul suffectus in AD 113.
- Gaius Stertinius, father of Lucius Stertinius Quintilianus, the consul of AD 146.
- Lucius Stertinius C. f. Quintilianus Acilius Strabo Gaius Curiatius Maternus Clodius Nummus, consul suffectus in AD 146.
- Stertinia L. f. Cocceia Bassula Venecia Aeliana, perhaps the granddaughter of the consul Lucius Stertinius Noricus, was the wife of Quintus Camurius Numisius Junior, legate of the sixth legion in Britain, and probably consul in AD 161.
- Marcus Aurelius Stertinius, procurator of a Roman camp, who with two of his brothers-in-arms, Hermioneus and Balbinus, dedicated a monument to Sol Invictus Mithras. His name, Marcus Aurelius, suggests that he had been granted Roman citizenship by a member of the Severan dynasty.

== See also ==
- List of Roman gentes

== Bibliography ==
- Polybius, Historiae (The Histories).
- Quintus Horatius Flaccus (Horace), Satirae (Satires), Epistulae (Letters).
- Titus Livius (Livy), History of Rome.
- Lucius Annaeus Seneca (Seneca the Elder), Controversiae.
- Gaius Plinius Secundus (Pliny the Elder), Naturalis Historia (Natural History).
- Marcus Valerius Martialis (Martial), Epigrammata (Epigrams).
- Publius Cornelius Tacitus, Annales.
- Dictionary of Greek and Roman Biography and Mythology, William Smith, ed., Little, Brown and Company, Boston (1849).
- Theodor Mommsen et alii, Corpus Inscriptionum Latinarum (The Body of Latin Inscriptions, abbreviated CIL), Berlin-Brandenburgische Akademie der Wissenschaften (1853–present).
- René Cagnat et alii, L'Année épigraphique (The Year in Epigraphy, abbreviated AE), Presses Universitaires de France (1888–present).
- Paul von Rohden, Elimar Klebs, & Hermann Dessau, Prosopographia Imperii Romani (The Prosopography of the Roman Empire, abbreviated PIR), Berlin (1898).
- T. Robert S. Broughton, The Magistrates of the Roman Republic, American Philological Association (1952).
- E. Mary Smallwood, Documents Illustrating the Principates of Nerva, Trajan, and Hadrian, Cambridge University Press (1966).
- Paul A. Gallivan, "The Fasti for A.D. 70–96", in Classical Quarterly, vol. 31, pp. 186–220 (1981).
- Robert Alan Gurval, Actium and Augustus: The Politics and Emotions of Civil War, University of Michigan Press (1995), ISBN 0472084895.
- Sjev van Tilborg, Reading John in Ephesus, E. J. Brill, Leiden (1996), ISBN 9004105301.
- Werner Eck, Gianfranco Paci, and E. Percossi Serenelli, "Per una nuova edizione dei Fasti Potentini", in Picus, vol. 23, pp. 51–108 (2003).
- Anthony R. Birley, The Roman Government in Britain, Oxford University Press (2005).
- Dorian Borbonus, Columbarium Tombs and Collective Identity in Augustan Rome, Cambridge University Press (2014), ISBN 9781107031401.
- Martin Klonnek, Chronologie des Römischen Reiches 2 Jahrhundert – Jahr 100 bis 199 (Chronology of the Roman Empire: the Second Century), epubli GmbH, Berlin (2014).
