= Lucius Sestius Albanianus Quirinalis =

Roman senator

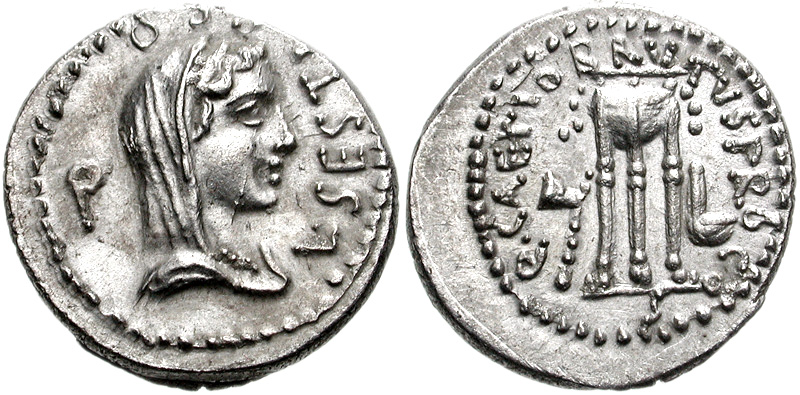
Coin of Lucius Sestius

Lucius Sestius Albanianus Quirinalis (fl. 43–23 BC) was an aristocrat of the late Roman Republic. Although having Republican tendencies, Augustus appointed him suffect consul in 23 BC to fill his role.

== Life ==
Sestius was a son of Publius Sestius and the daughter of one Gaius Albanius. Although Horace made him the subject of one of his odes (I.4), Ronald Syme explains it was simply to "indicate the publication year of the first three books" of his odes. Syme notes although Sestius served as a proquaestor of Marcus Junius Brutus, "he leaves no trace of either proper rank or capacity for the supreme magistracy" and opines that "Sestius may have been leading a life of tranquil leisure." If so, then this may indicate that Sestius had an aversion to public life, one of the characteristics of an Epicurean. This aversion to public life would make him a safe choice to serve as a consul; the following year Lucius Licinius Varro Murena, brother of Aulus Terentius Varro Murena, who was selected to be consul in 23 BC, but at the last moment replaced by Calpurnius Piso, was accused of conspiring against Augustus and murdered during his arrest.

== Other activities ==
During the excavations of the villa in Settefinestre, which belonged to Sestius Quirinalis' parents, potteries stamped with the letters LS ("Lucius Sestius") were found.

Literary sources credit him with the dedication of three arae (altars) of the Imperial cult in north-west Hispania, at some time around 19 BC.

== See also ==
- Sestia gens

Political offices
Preceded by Augustus XI as ordinarius	Roman consul (suffect); 23 BC; With: Gnaeus Calpurnius Piso	Succeeded by M. Claudius Marcellus Aeserninus; Lucius Arruntius as ordinarii
