= 20s BC =

Decade

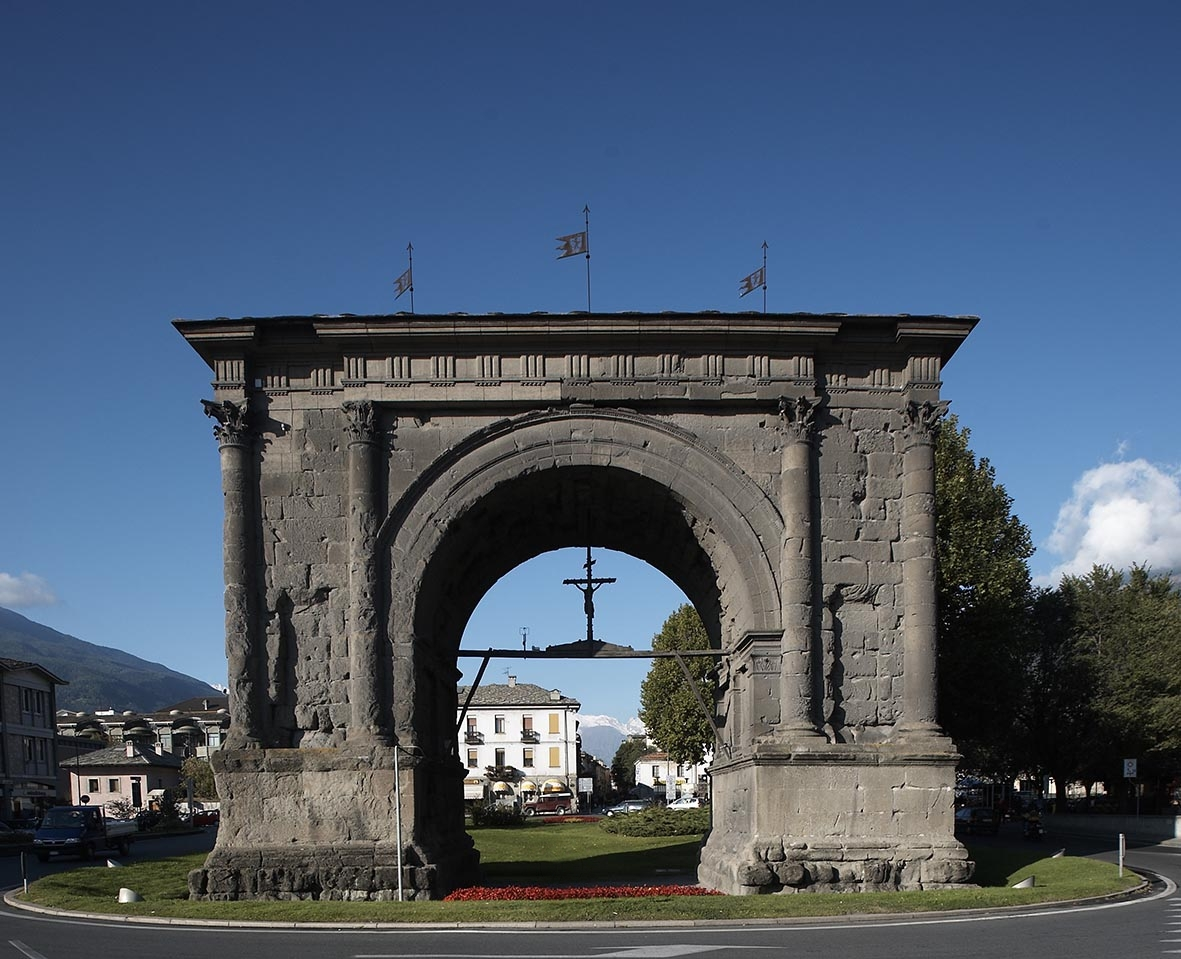
Augustus becomes Roman Emperor in 27 BC. This arch, the Arch of Augustus, was erected in 25 BC to celebrate the Roman victory over the Salassi.

The 20s BC were the period 29 BC – 20 BC.

== Events ==
=== 29 BC ===
==== Roman Republic ====
- Octavian Caesar becomes Roman Consul for the fifth time. His partner is Sextus Appuleius. He is granted the title of imperator, and for the third time in Roman history the doors of the Temple of Janus are closed, signalling peace.
- Octavian celebrates, in Rome, three triumphs on consecutive days (August 13, August 14, and August 15) to commemorate his victories in Illyricum, Actium and Egypt.
- Marcus Licinius Crassus campaigns successfully in the Balkans, killing the king of the Bastarnae by his own hand, but is denied the right to dedicate the spolia opima by Octavian.
- Sofia, modern day capital of Bulgaria, is conquered by the Romans and becomes known as Ulpia Serdica.
- Start of the Cantabrian Wars against Roman occupation in Hispania.
- Though started under the triumvirate with Mark Anthony and Marcus Lepidus, Octavian completes three projects in the Forum Romanum: Temple of the Deified Julius, the Curia, and the Chalcidicum.
- Virgil probably completes the Georgics and begins composition of the Aeneid.
- March 1 – Horace writes the ode Occidit Daci Cotisonis agmen.

==== Egypt ====
- Revolt of Thebes suppressed in Egypt.

==== Western Han Empire ====
- 29 BC Yellow River flood

=== 28 BC ===
==== Roman Republic ====
- Gaius Julius Caesar Octavian becomes Roman Consul for the sixth time. His partner Marcus Vipsanius Agrippa becomes Consul for the second time.
- The Roman Senate grants Octavian Caesar imperium maius (supreme command) of the Roman armed forces (Around 28 legions).
- Augustus initiates a census of the Roman Republic for the first time since 69 BC.
- Roman–Dardanian wars end

==== China ====
- May 10 – The earliest dated record of a sunspot by Chinese astronomers.

=== 27 BC ===
==== Roman Republic/Empire ====
- Gaius Julius Caesar Octavian becomes Roman Consul for the seventh time. His partner Marcus Vipsanius Agrippa becomes Consul for the third time.
- January 16 – Octavian formally returns full power to the Senate; they give him the titles of Princeps and Augustus. He accepts this honor, having declined the alternative title of Romulus, thus becoming first Roman emperor.
- Caesar Augustus starts a new military reform. He reduces the number of legions to 26 and creates the Praetorian Guard (1,000 men).
- Augustus forms the Classis Misenensis, based in the harbor of Portus Julius at Misenum.
- Agrippa divides Hispania Ulterior into Baetica and Lusitania, and enlarges Hispania Citerior.
- Northern statue of the Colossi of Memnon is shattered by an earthquake in Egypt (according to Strabo).
- Marcus Agrippa begins the construction of the old Pantheon, Rome.
- Augustus' first census of the Roman Empire (formerly the Roman Republic) reports a total of 4,063,000 citizens.

=== 26 BC ===
==== Roman Empire ====
- Imperator Caesar Augustus becomes Roman Consul for the eighth time. His partner Titus Statilius Taurus becomes Consul for the second time and refounds the old Contestanian Iberian capital of Ilici (Elche), known since then as "Colonia Iulia Ilici Augusta".
- Cleopatra Selene marries Juba II of Numidia, and as a wedding present Augustus makes her the queen of Mauretania in her own right.
- Disastrous campaign of Aelius Gallus in the Arabian Peninsula, then known as "Arabia Felix".
- Tiridates II invades Parthia and issues coins dated from March and May, 26 BC.
- Gavius Silo, orator, is heard by Caesar Augustus - mentioned by Seneca.
- Augustus starts a campaign against the Cantabrians in northern Hispania. He leads an army (8 legions) and consolidates the north-eastern region.

==== Greece ====
- Dioteimus Alaieus is one of the Archons of Athens.

==== Osroene ====
- Abgar III of Osroene is succeeded by Abgar IV Sumaqa.

==== Asia ====
- The Andhra dynasty replaces the Kanva dynasty, and rules over the eastern part of India.

==== South America ====
- August 29 – Christian Cross Asterism (astronomy) at Zenith of Lima, Peru.

=== 25 BC ===
==== Roman Empire ====
- Imperator Caesar Augustus becomes Consul for the ninth time. His partner is Marcus Junius Silanus.
- The temple to Neptune on the Circus Flaminius is built.
- Estimation: Rome, capital of the Roman Empire, becomes the largest city in the world, taking the lead from Chang'an, capital of China.
- Galatia becomes a Roman province after the death of its king. The Roman troops stationed there are relocated to Egypt.
- The Roman colony of Emerita Augusta is founded (present-day Mérida).

==== China ====
- The government gives its tributary states 20,000 rolls of silk cloth and about 20,000 pounds of silk floss.

=== 24 BC ===
==== Roman Empire ====
- Caesar Augustus becomes Roman Consul for the tenth time. His partner is Gaius Norbanus Flaccus.
- Augustus founds the city of Nicopolis in Egypt to commemorate his final victory over Mark Antony.
- Herod the Great marries for a third time, to Mariamne II, after a 4-year hiatus from family life (after putting to death his 2nd wife Mariamne I).

=== 23 BC ===
==== Roman Empire ====
- Caesar Augustus becomes Roman consul for the eleventh time. His co-consul is Aulus Terentius Varro Murena.
- Augustus relinquishes the position of consul, retains that of tribune of Rome, and assumes that of Princeps, or "First Citizen." (see Roman Empire).
- Augustus gets seriously ill: he gives Agrippa his signet ring and grants him the title imperium pro consule.
- Marcus Claudius Marcellus (nephew of Augustus) falls ill from a fever shortly after his uncle recovers and dies at the age of nineteen while serving as an aedile.
- The Nubians, led by queen Kandake Amanirenas, take the initiative against the Roman Empire, and attack the Roman province of Egypt moving towards Elephantine.
- In response to Meroë's incursions into Upper Egypt, the Roman legions move south and raze Napata. (History of Sudan).
- Herod the Great builds a palace in Jerusalem and the fortress Herodium in Judaea. He also marries his third wife, named Mariamne, the daughter of high priest Simon.
- Following coinage reform, the as is struck in reddish pure copper, instead of bronze. The denominations of sestertius and dupondius are introduced as large bronze coins.
- The Roman writer, architect and engineer Marcus Vitruvius Pollio finishes writing De Architectura (known today as The Ten Books of Architecture), a treatise in Latin on architecture, and perhaps the first work about this discipline.
- The Roman poet Horace publishes the first three books of Odes.

==== Osroene ====
- Ma'nu III Saphul becomes ruler of Osroene.

==== Japan ====
- The earliest documented instance of wrestling in Japan

=== 22 BC ===
==== Roman Empire ====
- Aemilius Lepidus Paullus and Lucius Munatius Plancus are Censors.
- The Roman governor of Egypt, Gaius Petronius, marches up the Nile with legions XXII Deiotariana and III Cyrenaica, and destroys the Nubian capital of Napata.
- King Artaxias II returns, with the support of the Parthians, to Armenia and claims the throne. Artavasdes I escapes to Rome, where Caesar Augustus receives him.

=== 21 BC ===
==== Roman Empire ====
- Marcus Vipsanius Agrippa divorces Claudia Marcella Major, and marries Julia the Elder, daughter of Caesar Augustus.

=== 20 BC ===
==== Roman Empire ====
- May 12 – Emperor Augustus Caesar negotiates a peace with Parthia, making Armenia a buffer zone between the two major powers. The captured eagles of Marcus Licinius Crassus and Mark Antony are returned.

== Significant people ==
- Caesar Augustus, Roman Emperor (27 BC–AD 14)

== Births ==
=== 27 BC ===
- Ai of Han, Chinese emperor of the Han Dynasty (d. 1 BC)

=== 25 BC ===
- Aulus Cornelius Celsus, author of De Medicina (d. c. AD 50)

=== 23 BC ===
- Dong Xian, Chinese politician and general (d. 1 BC)
- Herod Archelaus, ethnarch of Samaria (Judea) (d. AD 18)

=== 21 BC ===
- Naevius Sutorius Macro, Roman prefect and politician (d. AD 38)

=== 20 BC ===
- June 3 – Lucius Aelius Sejanus, advisor of Tiberius (d. AD 31)
- Gaius Caesar, grandson of Augustus Caesar (d. AD 4)
- Lucius Antonius, grandson of Mark Antony d. AD 25)
- Philo of Alexandria, Jewish philosopher (d. AD 50)

== Deaths ==
=== 29 BC ===
- Antiochus II, Armenian prince of Commagene (executed)
- Mariamne I, wife of Herod the Great (executed) (or 28 BC)
- Ptolemy Philadelphus, Ptolemaic prince of Egypt (b. 36 BC)

=== 28 BC ===
- Alexandra the Maccabee, Hasmonean princess (approximate date)
- Mariamne I, Hasmonean princess and wife Herod the Great (or 29 BC)

=== 27 BC ===
- Marcus Terentius Varro, Roman scholar and writer (b. 116 BC)

=== 26 BC ===
- Gaius Cornelius Gallus, Roman politician and poet (b. 70 BC)
- Marcus Valerius Messalla Rufus, Roman politician

=== 25 BC ===
- Amyntas of Galatia, King of Galatia

=== 24 BC ===
- Aulus Terentius Varro Murena, Roman general and politician

=== 23 BC ===
- Marcus Claudius Marcellus, son of Octavia and nephew of Augustus (b. 42 BC)

=== 22 BC ===
- Lucius Licinius Varro Murena, Roman politician, executed

=== 20 BC ===
- Artavasdes I, king of Media Atropatene (approximate date)
- Artaxias II, king of Armenia (Artaxiad dynasty)
- Fuzhulei Ruodi, ruler of the Xiongnu Empire
- Mirian II (or Mirvan), king of Iberia (Georgia)
- Mithridates II, king of Commagene (Armenia)
