= Ruspina =

Phoenician, Carthaginian and Roman town

Coordinates: 35.7694°N 10.8253°E

Ruspina was a Phoenician, Carthaginian and Roman town located in Monastir, Tunisia, situated in Roman times in Africa propria, and mentioned by Pliny the Elder and Ptolemy.

== Name ==
The Phoenician and Punic name ršpn (𐤓𐤔𐤐𐤍) or ršpnt (𐤓𐤔𐤐𐤍𐤕) seems to mean "Angle Cape". It was used for the cape and hills at the south end of the Bay of Hammamet and for the main settlement near the cape. The Punic name was variously hellenized as Rhouspînon (Ancient Greek: Ῥουσπῖνον), Rhouspino, (Ῥουσπίνῳ), Rhouspína (Ῥουσπίνα), or Rhoúspina (Ῥούσπινα) but consistently latinized as Ruspina.

== Geography ==
The exact location of the city is uncertain. Nathan Davis believes it was located at modern day Monastir. Multiple tombs and ruins have been discovered in this city that may have been part of Ruspina.

== History ==
The Carthaginian town came under Roman hegemony after the Punic Wars. In 46 BC, the town was the first in Africa to ally itself with Julius Caesar during his civil war. The same year, the Battle of Ruspina was a victory for Pompey's ally T. Labienus.
