= Pollio =

Pollio may refer to:

- Marcus Vitruvius Pollio, Roman architect usually known as Vitruvius
- Gaius Asinius Pollio, Roman historian and orator
- Gaius Asinius Pollio (consul 23), grandson of the preceding
- Rufrius Pollio, Roman Prefect of the Praetorian Guard
- Vitrasius Pollio (died AD 32) Roman member of the equestrian class
- Abtalion, a leading rabbi in the 1st century BC, known as Pollion in Greek and Pollio in Latin
- Vedius Pollio, friend of Roman emperor Augustus
- Pollio of Cybalae, 3rd-century Christian martyr
- Alberto Pollio (1852–1914), Italian general and Chief of Staff of the Italian army
- Claudio Pollio (born 1958), Italian Olympic champion wrestler
- Mariasole Pollio (born 2003), Italian actress, television presenter, radio personality and model
- Marty Pollio (born 1955), American comedian and actor
- Mike Pollio (born 1943), American former basketball coach and college athletics administrator
- Silvio Pollio, director of the 2003 crime film How It All Went Down

== See also ==
- Polio (disambiguation)
