= Marcus Claudius Marcellus Aeserninus =

Marcus Claudius Marcellus Aeserninus is a name used by several men of the gens Claudia, including:

- Marcus Claudius Marcellus Aeserninus is mentioned by Cicero as a young man at the trial of Verres (70 BC), on which occasion he appeared as a witness, where, however, several editions give his name as C. Marcellus.
- Marcus Claudius Marcellus Aeserninus was quaestor in Hispania in 48 BC, under Quintus Cassius Longinus. Some scholars suppose him to be a son of the preceding, while others, such as Johann Caspar von Orelli, regard him as identical. Cassius sent him with a body of troops to hold possession of Corduba, on occasion of the mutiny and revolt excited in Hispania by his own exactions. But Marcellus quickly joined the mutineers, though whether voluntarily or by compulsion is not certain, and put himself at the head of all the troops assembled at Corduba, whom he retained in their fidelity to Julius Caesar, at the same time that he prepared to resist Cassius by force of arms. But though the two leaders, with their armies, were for some time opposed to one another, Marcellus avoided coming to a general engagement, and on the arrival soon after of the proconsul, Marcus Aemilius Lepidus, he hastened to submit to his authority and place the legions under his command at his disposal. Due to the questionable part he had acted on this occasion, Marcellus at first incurred the resentment of Caesar but was afterwards restored to favor.
- Marcus Claudius Marcellus Aeserninus was consul in 22 BC. Perhaps the same person as the preceding. He married Asinia, the daughter of Gaius Asinius Pollio, who was consul in 40 BC.
- Marcus Claudius Marcellus Aeserninus, son of the preceding, with Asinia. When a boy he broke his leg while performing in the equestrian Troy Game before Augustus, causing his grandfather, Asinius Pollio, to complain so loudly that Augustus never held the game again. He was trained with much care by his grandfather in all kinds of oratorical exercises, and gave much promise as an orator. In 20 AD he was one of those whom Gnaeus Calpurnius Piso requested to undertake his defense on the charge of having poisoned Germanicus, but he declined the office. It is probable that the Asinius Marcellus mentioned by Tacitus as a great-grandson of Pollio was a son of this Aeserninus.

== See also ==
- Claudii Marcelli

Political offices
Preceded by Augustus XI, and Gnaeus Calpurnius Piso	Consul of the Roman Empire; 22 BC with Lucius Arruntius	Succeeded by Marcus Lollius, and Quintus Aemilius Lepidus
