= Grenelle =

District of Paris

Coordinates: 48°51′N 2°18′E

15e arrondissement

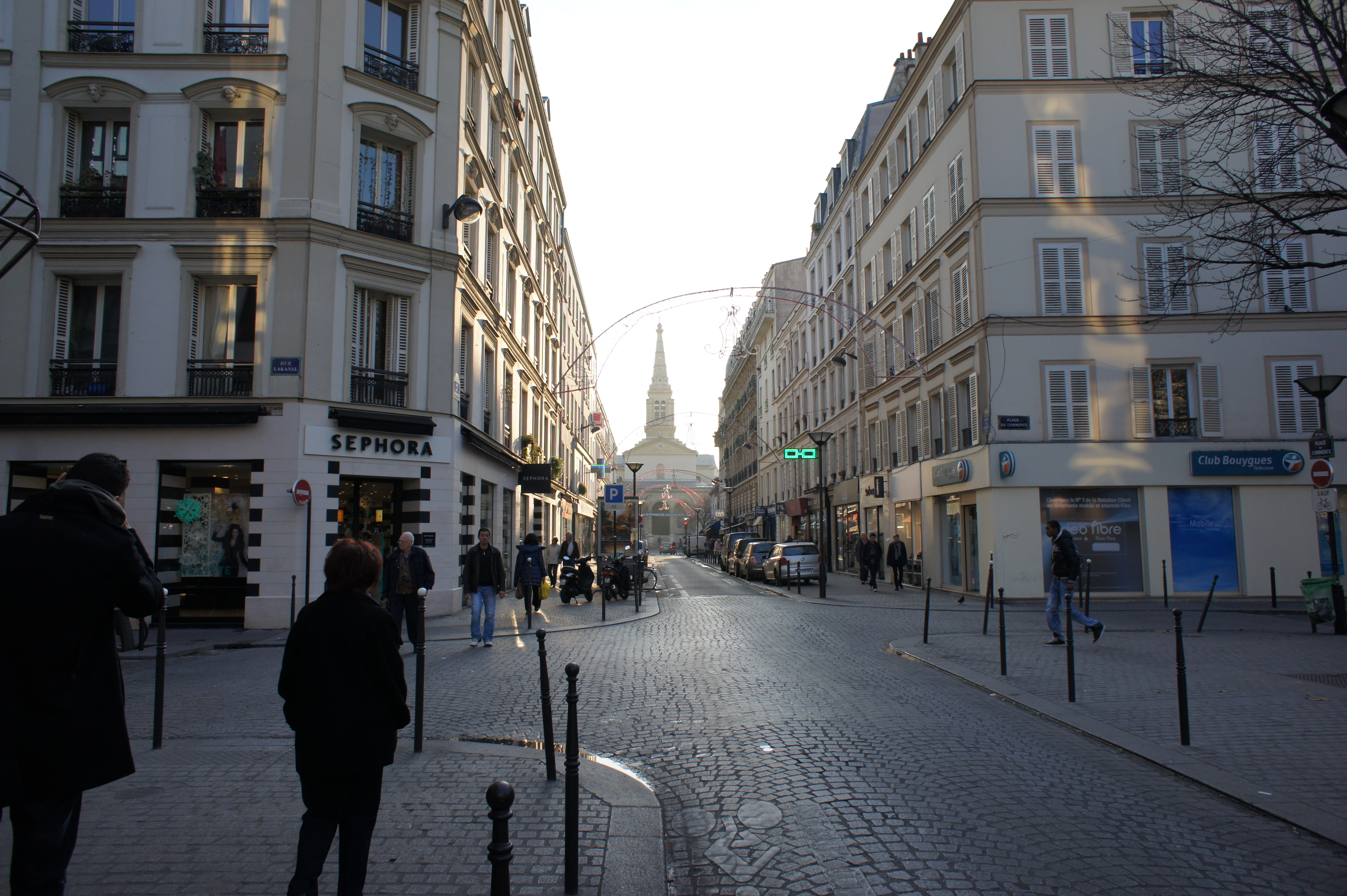
Rue du Commerce

Grenelle (French pronunciation: [ɡʁənɛl]) is a neighbourhood in southwestern Paris, France. It is a part of the 15th arrondissement of the city.

There is currently a Boulevard de Grenelle which runs along the North delimitation of the quartier, and a Rue de Grenelle, a few kilometers North-East in the 7th arrondissement.

== History ==
In 52 BC, Garanella plain was the site of the Battle of Lutetia between the troops of the Gaulish chief Camulogène and the Roman legion under General Labienus. Despite their courageous resistance, the Gauls were defeated.

Towards the middle of the 13th century, Grenelle became a fiefdom of the Abbey of St Genevieve and became part of the village of Vaugirard.

On May 15, 1824, two city councillors from Vaugirard, Jean-Léonard Violet and Alphonse Letellier, bought and divided up Grenelle plain. They did this rather quickly, and the new quartier Beaugrenelle was founded on June 27, 1824.

Thenceforth, under the encouragement of a group of entrepreneurs (the Compagnie des Entrepreneurs, founded by Violet and Letellier), the quartier continued to develop, occasionally provoking feelings of hostility from residents of old Vaugirard. Thus, on May 13, 1829, following the refusal of the city to install oil lamps, the residents of Beaugrenelle demanded to break off from Vaugirard, a separation which took place the next year. However, it was to be short-lived. On 1 January 1860, despite the objections of the residents of Grenelle, Baron Haussmann decided to annex Grenelle, Vaugirard, and Javel, thus creating the 15th arrondissement.

== Notable events ==
- Explosion of the Powder Magazine at Grenelle, (1794) in which fifteen hundred people lost their lives — Decree for checking the progress of Vandalism — The monuments of the arts and sciences placed under the care of the authorities.
- The 1804 explosion of the Grenelle powder magazine shook Paris and caused many pregnant women to miscarry.
- On March 8, 1871, during the Paris Commune, the Army of Thiers refused to hand over cannons to their arguably-legal possessors, the Republican-aligned National Guard. The later resorted by burning down an Army barracks in Rue de Grenelle ("Grenelle Street").
