= Eugène-Louis Lequesne =

French sculptor

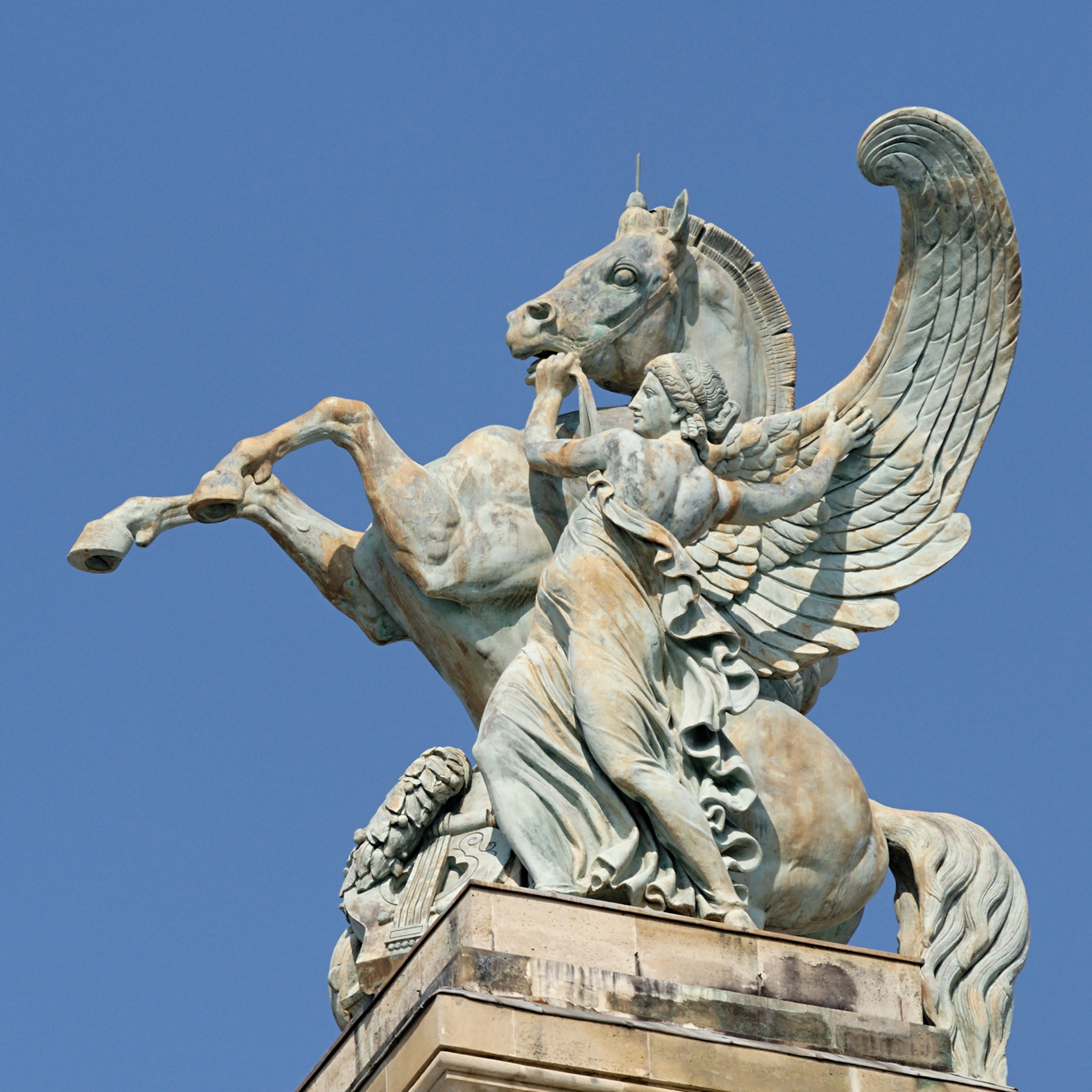
La Renommée retenant Pégase (Renown holding back Pegasus), Palais Garnier, Paris

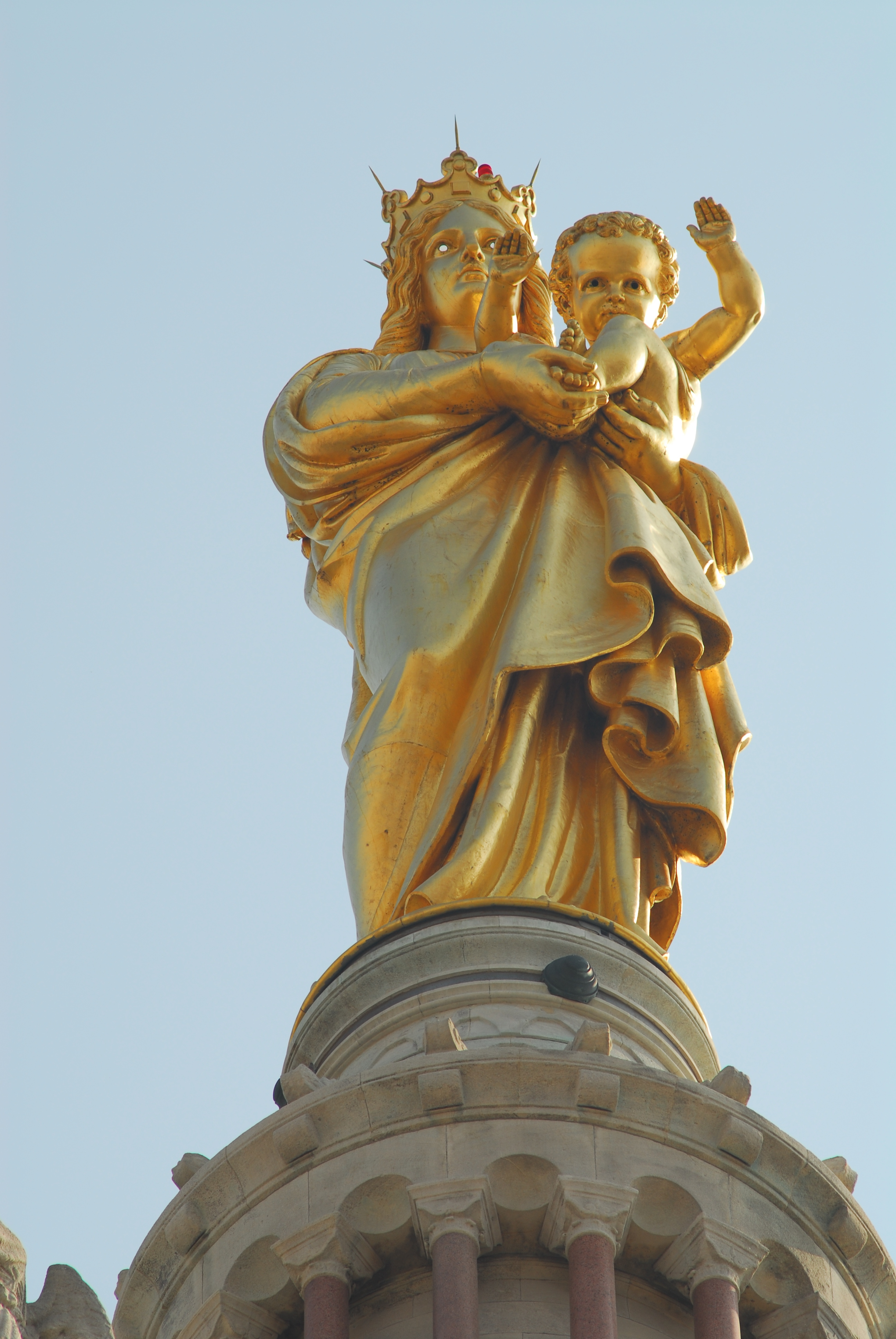
La Bonne Mère (The Good Mother), Notre-Dame de la Garde, Marseille

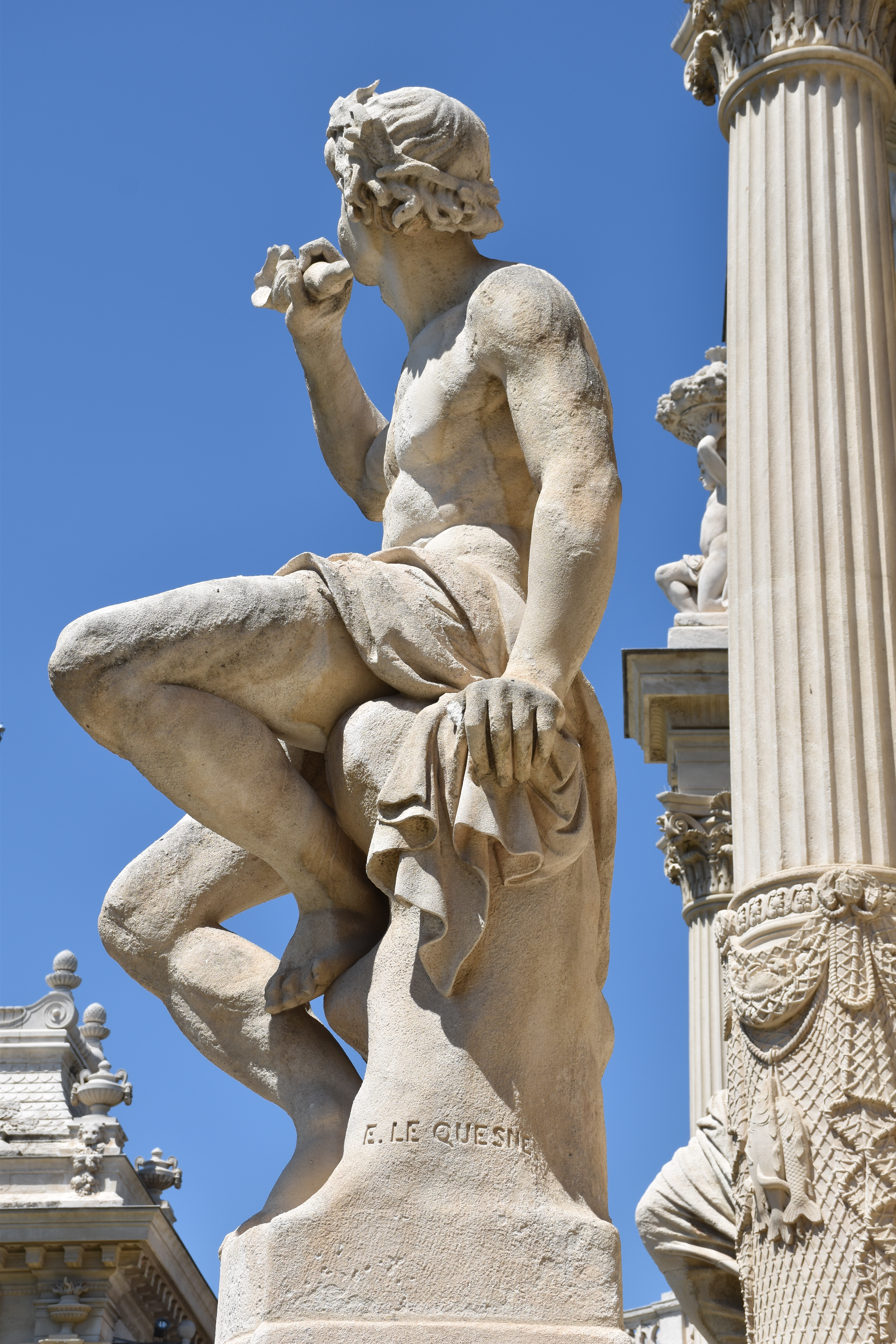
Triton blowing on a conch shell situated to the right of the château d’eau, Palais Longchamp, Marseille

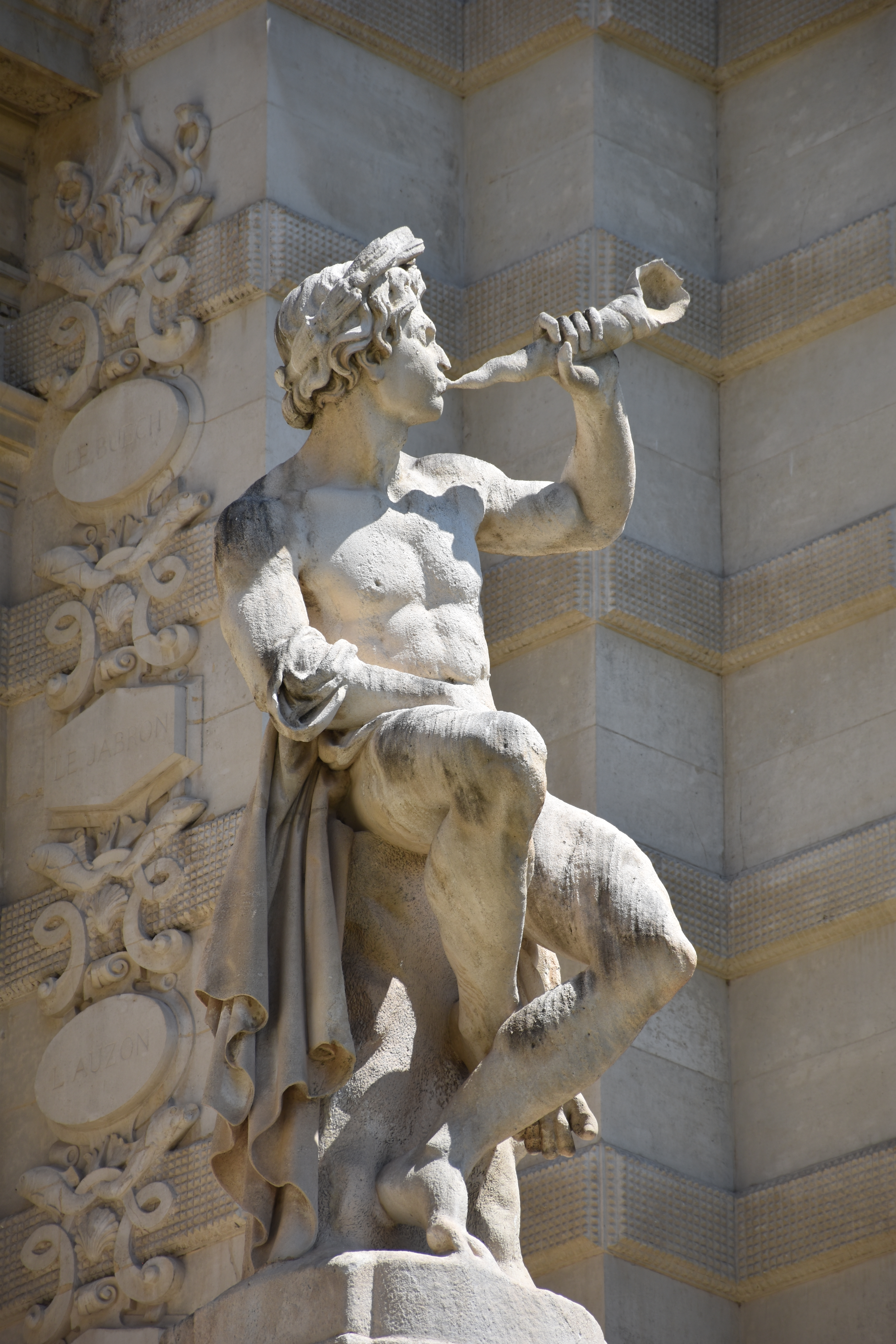
Triton blowing on a conch shell, situated to the left of the château d’eau, Palais Longchamp, Marseille

Eugène-Louis Lequesne (French pronunciation: [øʒɛn lwi ləkɛn]; or Le Quesne; 15 February 1815 – 3 June 1887) was a French sculptor. Lequesne was born and died in Paris. In 1841, he entered the École nationale des beaux-arts, in James Pradier's workshop. In 1843, he won the second Prix de Rome, and in 1844 the first prize, with a plaster bas-relief entitled Pyrrhus tuant Priam (Pyrrhus killing Priam). He lived at the Académie de France à Rome from 1844 to 1849, alongside Jean-Louis Charles Garnier. In 1855, he was awarded the Great Prize for sculpture at the Exposition Universelle, and received the Légion d'honneur.

== Main works ==
- figures representing Rouen and Amiens, on the façade of the Gare du Nord, Paris, circa 1862
- colossal finial figure of La Bonne Mère (The Good Mother), Notre-Dame de la Garde, Marseille, 1867
- plaster figure of Camulogene, Palais des Beaux-Arts de Lille, 1872
- two Pegasus figures, Palais Garnier, Paris
- Faune Dansant (Dancing Faun), Jardin du Luxembourg, Paris
- La Foi, La Charité et L'Espérance (Faith, Charity and Hope), Église de la Sainte-Trinité, Paris
- two medallions on the façade of the Musée de Picardie in Amiens: Thuillier Constant and Du Cange
- two caryatids on the façade of the Musée de Picardie in Amiens: L'Industrie and La Sculpture
- Masque d’Homère (Mask of Homer), Museum of Beaufort
- Faune Dansant (Dancing Faun), Musée des Beaux-Arts de Bordeaux
- Prêtresse de Bacchus (Priestess of Bacchus), Musée des Beaux-Arts de Cambrai
- À quoi rêvent les jeunes filles (What young girls dream of) and Vercingétorix vaincu défiant les soldats romains (Defeated Vercingetorix defying Roman soldiers), Museum of Chartres
- Le buste de Laënnec (Bust of Laënnec), Faculté de médecine de Paris
- Thuillier, Museum of Roanne
- Le Maréchal de Saint-Arnaud (Marshal Saint-Arnaud), Palace of Versailles
- Renommée retenant Pégase (Renown holding back Pegasus), Musée d'Orsay, Paris
