= Battle of Ruspina =

Part of Caesar's civil war (46 BC)

Coordinates: 35.7667°N 10.8167°E

- Part of Caesar's Civil War
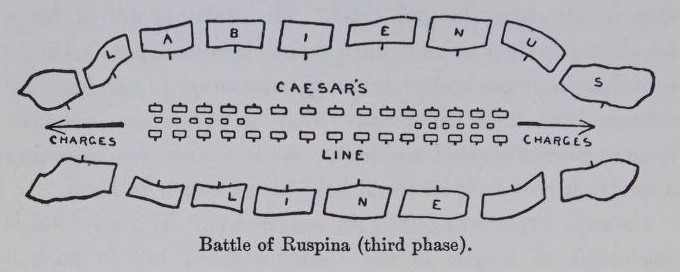
- Map of the third phase of the battle
Date	4 January 46 BC
Location	Ruspina, Africa
Result	Pompeian victory

Belligerents
Pompeians; Numidia	Caesarians

Commanders and leaders
Titus Labienus (WIA); Marcus Petreius (WIA); Gnaeus Calpurnius Piso	Gaius Julius Caesar; Publius Hostilius Saserna

Strength
9,600 Numidian cavalry 1,600 Gallic and Germanic cavalry Many infantrymen	30 cohorts 400 cavalry 150 archers

Casualties and losses
heavy	unknown

The Battle of Ruspina was fought on 4 January 46 BC in the Roman province of Africa, between the Republican forces of the Optimates and forces loyal to Julius Caesar. The Republican army was commanded by Titus Labienus, Caesar's former lieutenant during the Gallic Wars who had defected to the Republican side at the beginning of the civil war.

== Prelude ==
Julius Caesar entered Lilybaeum in Sicily on 17 December 47 BC and assembled an army there to defeat the Optimates in Africa. He set sail on 25 December, but his limited intelligence about a proper landing site and winds scattered his fleet. He had six legions and 2,000 cavalry but only the bare necessity of supplies due to a lack of shipping.

Caesar landed near Hadrumentum with 3,500 legionaries and 150 cavalry. The city's garrison refused to surrender and Caesar set up camp at Ruspina. On 1 January 46 BC, he arrived at Leptis where he was reinforced by some of his scattered troops (elements of fifth and the tenth legions). The next day several more reinforcements arrived at Ruspina. He left six cohorts to hold Leptis and marched back to Ruspina. On 4 January Caesar went off on a foraging mission, initially with thirty cohorts. The Optimates were near and Caesar sent for his 400 cavalry and 150 archers as well. He then conducted a reconnaissance.

== Battle ==
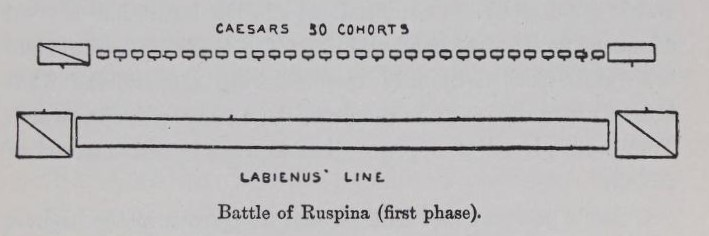
Map of the first phase of the battle

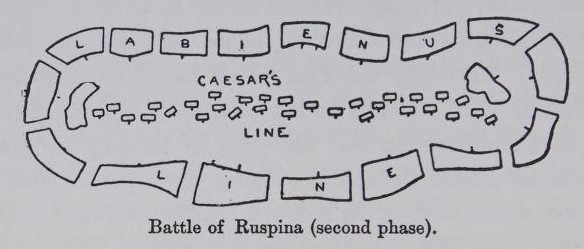
Map of the second phase of the battle

Titus Labienus commanded the Optimate force, which included many infantrymen, 8,000 Numidian cavalry and 1,600 Gallic and Germanic cavalry. Caesar deployed his army in one line to prevent envelopment, with his archers up front and the cavalry on the wings. Labienus's cavalry pushed back Caesar's cavalry and surrounded the Caesarian army. In the center, the Numidian light infantry launched projectiles at the Caesarian legionaries, staying out of the Caesarians's reach. Caesar's legions redeployed into a circle to face attacks from all sides. The Numidian light infantry bombarded the legionaries with missiles. Caesar's legionaries threw their pila at the enemy in return, but were ineffective.

Titus Labienus rode up to the front rank of Caesar's troops, coming very near in order to taunt the enemy troops. A veteran of the Tenth Legion approached Labienus, who recognized him. The veteran threw his pilum at Labienus's horse, wounding it. "That'll teach you Labienus, that a soldier of the Tenth is attacking you", the veteran growled, shaming Labienus in front of his own men. Some men however began to panic. An aquilifer attempted to flee but Caesar grabbed the man, spun him around and shouted "the enemy are over there!"

Caesar broadened the length of his line and made every other cohort turn around, so the standards would be facing the Numidian cavalry in the Romans' rear and the other cohorts the Numidian light infantry to the front. The legionaries charged and threw their pila, scattering the Optimates infantry and cavalry. They pursued their enemy for a short distance, and then began to march back to camp. However Marcus Petreius and Gnaeus Calpurnius Piso appeared with 1,600 Numidian cavalry and a large number of light infantry who harassed Caesar's legionaries as they retreated. Caesar readied his army for combat and drove the Optimates forces back. Petreius was wounded at this point. Exhausted, Caesar moved back to camp.

== Aftermath ==
Caesar had failed in his initial goal of gaining supplies for his army. However, his army remained intact; Caesar fortified his camp at Ruspina and made light infantrymen out of his sailors. His craftsmen produced projectiles and Caesar sent messages to bring up grain and other supplies. Metellus Scipio joined forces with Labienus and Petreius and they set up camp three miles from Caesar's.

== Bibliography ==
- Goldsworthy, Adrian (2006). Caesar: Life of a Colossus. New Haven, Connecticut: Yale University Press. ISBN 978-0-300-12048-6.
