= Marcus Antonius Primus =

1st-century Roman senator and general

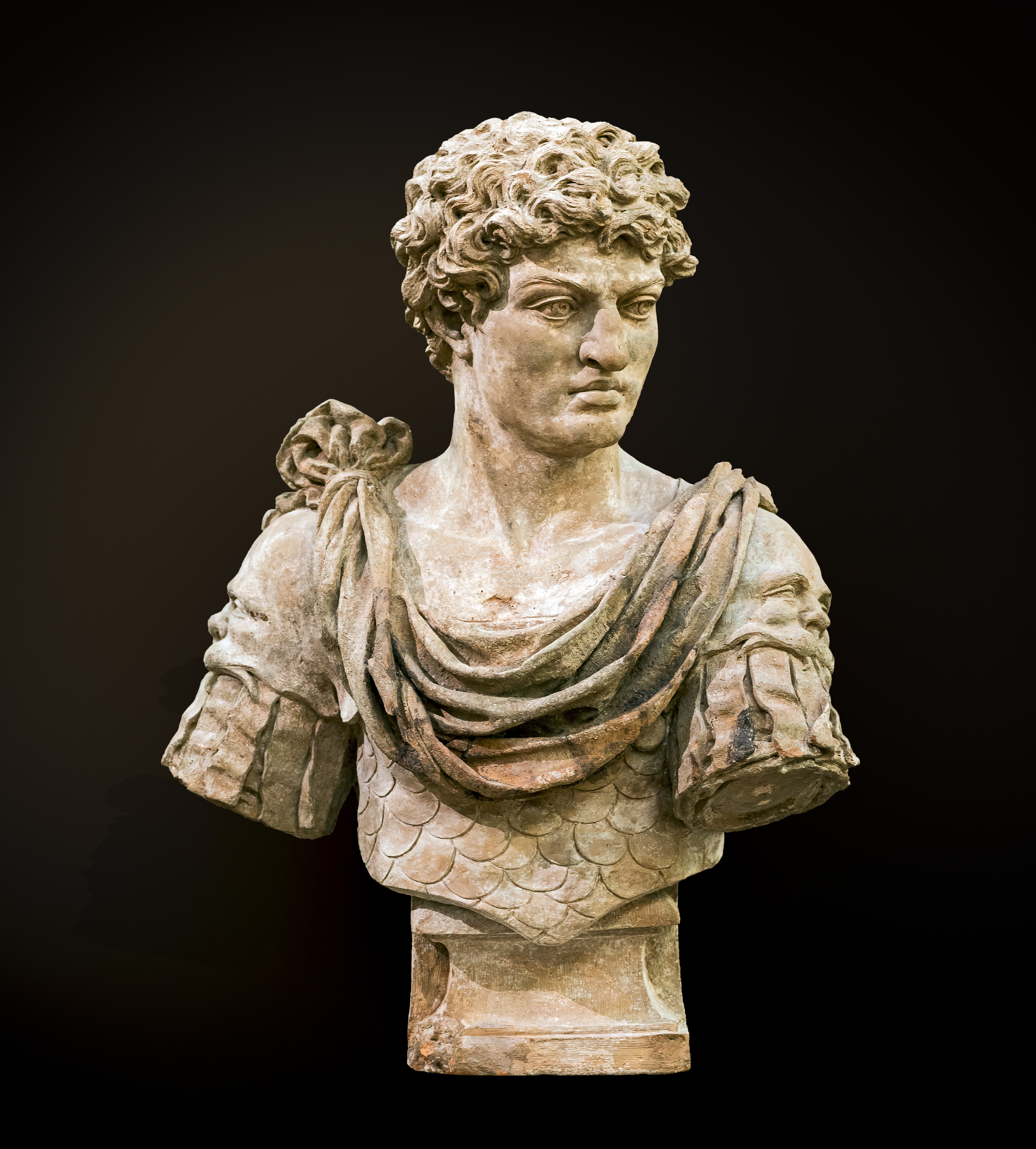
- Bust of Primus by Marc Arcis
- Born: Tolosa (Toulouse)

Marcus Antonius Primus (born between 20 AD and 35 AD – died after 81 AD) was a senator and general of the Roman Empire. He played a crucial role in Vespasian's accession during the turbulent Year of the Four Emperors, defeating the forces of emperor Vitellius and capturing Rome.

== Biography ==
=== Early life ===
Primus was born at Tolosa (Toulouse) in Gaul. It has been suggested that he was the son of Lucius Antonius, thus making him the great-grandson of Marc Antony. It is also possible that he was descended from Gauls who had been enfranchised by Mark Antony during his Gallic campaign. Kenneth Wellesley wrote that he was nicknamed Beccus ("Beaky"), likely due to his physique. James Noel Adams writes, "the cognomen Beccus, meaning ‘beak (of a cock)’". The Loeb translation of Suetonius' Twelve Caesars says, "in his youth bore the surname Becco, which means a rooster’s beak”, the footnote that accompanies the above quote says, “Gallus means “a cock,” as well as “a Gaul.”

=== Career ===
During the reign of Nero, he was resident in Rome and a member of the Senate, from which he was expelled for conspiring to forge a will with Valerius Fabianus, and was banished from the city. He was subsequently reinstated by Galba, and placed in command of the Legio XIII Gemina in Pannonia.

During the civil war, Primus was one of Vespasian's strongest supporters. Advancing into Italy, he gained a decisive victory over the Vitellians at Bedriacum in October 69, and on the same day stormed and captured Cremona. His victorious troops then sacked and burned the city. Embarrassed by the incident he forbade enslavement of captive Cremonans, and their captors then began murdering those who could not be ransomed. He then crossed the Apennines, and made his way to Rome, into which he forced an entrance after considerable opposition. Vitellius was seized and put to death. For a few days, Primus was virtually ruler of Rome, and the Senate bestowed upon him the rank and insignia of a consul, but on the arrival of Licinius Mucianus, he left Rome.

Primus must have been alive during the reign of Domitian, since four epigrams of Martial are addressed to him. Tacitus describes him as brave in action, ready of speech, clever at bringing others into odium, powerful in times of civil war and rebellion, greedy, extravagant, in peace a bad citizen, in war an ally not to be despised.
