= Terentii Varrones =

The Terentii Varrones were a branch of the gens Terentia in ancient Rome.

== Members ==
- Gaius Terentius Varro (d. sometime after 200 BC), the surviving commander of the defeated Roman army at the Battle of Cannae.
- Aulus Terentius Varro, an envoy (legatus) of Aulus Cornelius Mammula, who was stationed with troops as propraetor in Greece, in 190–189. Along with Marcus Claudius Lepidus, Varro was sent to the Roman Senate to deliver "disturbing reports" from Asia. In 189, he returned to Greece with envoys from Aetolia. In 184, he was assigned to Hispania Citerior ("Nearer" Roman Spain) as praetor, and levied a new army with which he successfully fought the Suessetani. He continued his command as propraetor in 183–182, with victories over the Ausetani and Celtiberi. In 182, he may have held proconsular powers, and upon his return to Rome that year celebrated an ovatio. In 172, Varro was part of a diplomatic embassy to Gentius, king of Ilyria, that lodged a protest against attacks on Roman allies. In 167, he was among the ten legates known to have been assigned by the Senate to assist the imperator Lucius Aemilius Paullus in organizing Macedonia as a Roman province. Either he or the A. Terentius Varro who was a legate in 82 BC was honored with a statue by the Delians.
- Terentius Varro, a quaestor in Hispania Ulterior ("Farther" Roman Spain) in 154 BC. He served under the praetor Lucius Calpurnius Piso Caesoninus, and was killed in a battle with the Lusitani led by Punicus that resulted in heavy Roman losses.
- Terentius Varro, conjectured name of a monetalis whose coinage, issued sometime in the period 150 to 133 BC, named him as VARO.
- Aulus Terentius Varro, one of the ten legates known to have been sent by the Senate in 146 to assist the consul Lucius Mummius in reorganizing Greece under Roman rule. They returned in the spring of 145.
- Aulus Terentius Varro, a lieutenant (legatus) in 82 BC under Lucius Licinius Murena as propraetor in Asia. He was prosecuted twice for extortion while in Asia, but was represented by Quintus Hortensius and acquitted.
- Terentius Varro, possibly a praetor in 78 BC, if he is correctly identified as the governor of Asia in 77. He is otherwise unknown, and this promagistrate of Asia may instead have been the Aulus Terentius Varro who was Murena's legate and tried for extortion.
- Marcus Terentius Varro Lucullus, the consul of 73 BC, born Marcus Licinius Lucullus but adopted in adulthood, the younger brother of the famous Lucullus.
- Marcus Terentius Varro, usually known in English by his cognomen Varro, one of the leading scholars writing in Latin at the time of Julius Caesar.
- Marcus Terentius Varro Gibba, quaestor in 46 under Marcus Junius Brutus in Cisalpine Gaul and tribune of the plebs in 43. He died at the Battle of Philippi.
- Publius Terentius Varro Atacinus, the younger contemporary of the famous Varro, a poet from Gaul usually known as Varro Atacinus.
- Aulus Terentius Varro Murena, a legate of Pompeius Magnus ("Pompey the Great") in 48. He was among the Pompeians present at the conference at the Apsus river. An inscription records him as curule aedile in or before 44 BC, along with a Lucius Trebellius Fides.
- Aulus Terentius Varro Murena, a Roman general who died before he could assume the consulship for 23 BC with Augustus.

== See also ==
- Varro (cognomen)
