= Publius Sestius =

Publius Sestius (died after 35 BC) was a Roman politician and governor in the 1st century BC.

He first appears as quaestor for the consul Gaius Antonius Hybrida and served in the campaign to put down the second Catilinarian conspiracy. He served a proquaestorship in Macedonia from 62–61 BC. He was elected as one of the tribunes of the plebs for 57 BC. During his year as tribune, he worked to have Cicero recalled from exile, combatted – with Titus Annius Milo – the urban mobs of Publius Clodius Pulcher, and also attempted to disrupt Clodius' election as aedile in that year. He was Cicero's friend and ally; Cicero later defended him in Pro Sestio on charges of public violence in 56 BC.

He also had served as praetor by 54 or 50 BC, though likely in 54 BC. Upon the outbreak of Caesar's Civil War he joined Pompey, becoming the governor of Cilicia probably with the rank of proconsul. Marcus Junius Brutus accompanied him to the province. After the Battle of Pharsalus in which Pompey was decisively defeated, Sestius was pardoned by Julius Caesar and campaigned with Gnaeus Domitius Calvinus in Asia Minor.

He was the son of a Lucius Sestius. He was married twice. The identity of his first wife is debated. She was either Postumia, daughter of a Gaius Postumius Albinus, or Albania, daughter of a Gaius Albanius. His second wife was Cornelia, the daughter of Lucius Cornelius Scipio Asiaticus. With his first wife he had two children, a son, Lucius Sestius, and a daughter named Sestia.
