= Battle of Lutetia =

52 BC battle between Roman and Gallic forces, part of Caesar's Gallic Wars

Coordinates: 48°51′N 2°21′E

- Part of the Gallic Wars
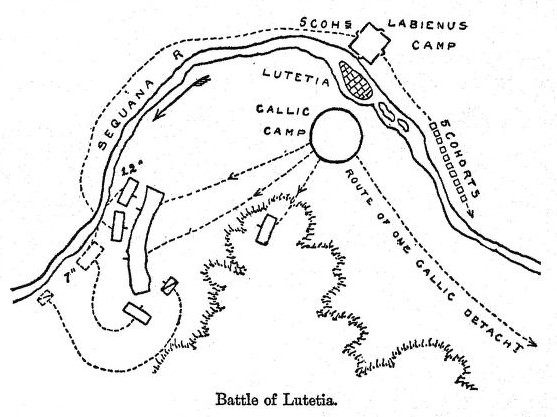
- Battle of Lutetia (sketch from 1892)
Date	52 BC
Location	Plain of Grenelle
Result	Roman victory

Belligerents
Roman Republic	Gallic coalition forces (Northern Coalition): • Parisii • Senones • Aulerci

Commanders and leaders
Titus Labienus	Camulogenus †

Units involved
Legio VII; Legio IX; Legio XII; Legio XIV; Auxiliary Cavalry; Auxiliary light infantry	Army of the Northern Coalition

Strength
Four legions (Note: Caesar mentions sending Labienus with four legions and 2,000 cavalry. Livius.org mentions Legio VII, IX, XII and XIV.); 2,000 cavalry (Note: Caesar mentions sending Labienus with four legions and 2,000 cavalry.); an unknown number of auxiliaries (Note: Caesar's armies were almost always accompanied by an unknown number of skirmishers (archers, slingers, javelinmen). Caesar mentions them on several occasions.); 10,000–20,000 legionaries (Note: Caesar's legions were understrength most of the time (as a result of hard campaigning). They usually numbered between 2,500–5,000 men.); 2,000 cavalry; Unknown number of auxiliaries infantry (skirmishers)	unknown

The Battle of Lutetia was fought in 52 BC on the plain of Grenelle in what is now Paris, between Roman forces under Titus Labienus and an anti-Roman Gallic coalition during the Gallic Wars. The Romans were victorious. Julius Caesar offers an account of the battle in his Gallic Wars, for which he draws both on Labienus' report and an episode in Polybius's history.

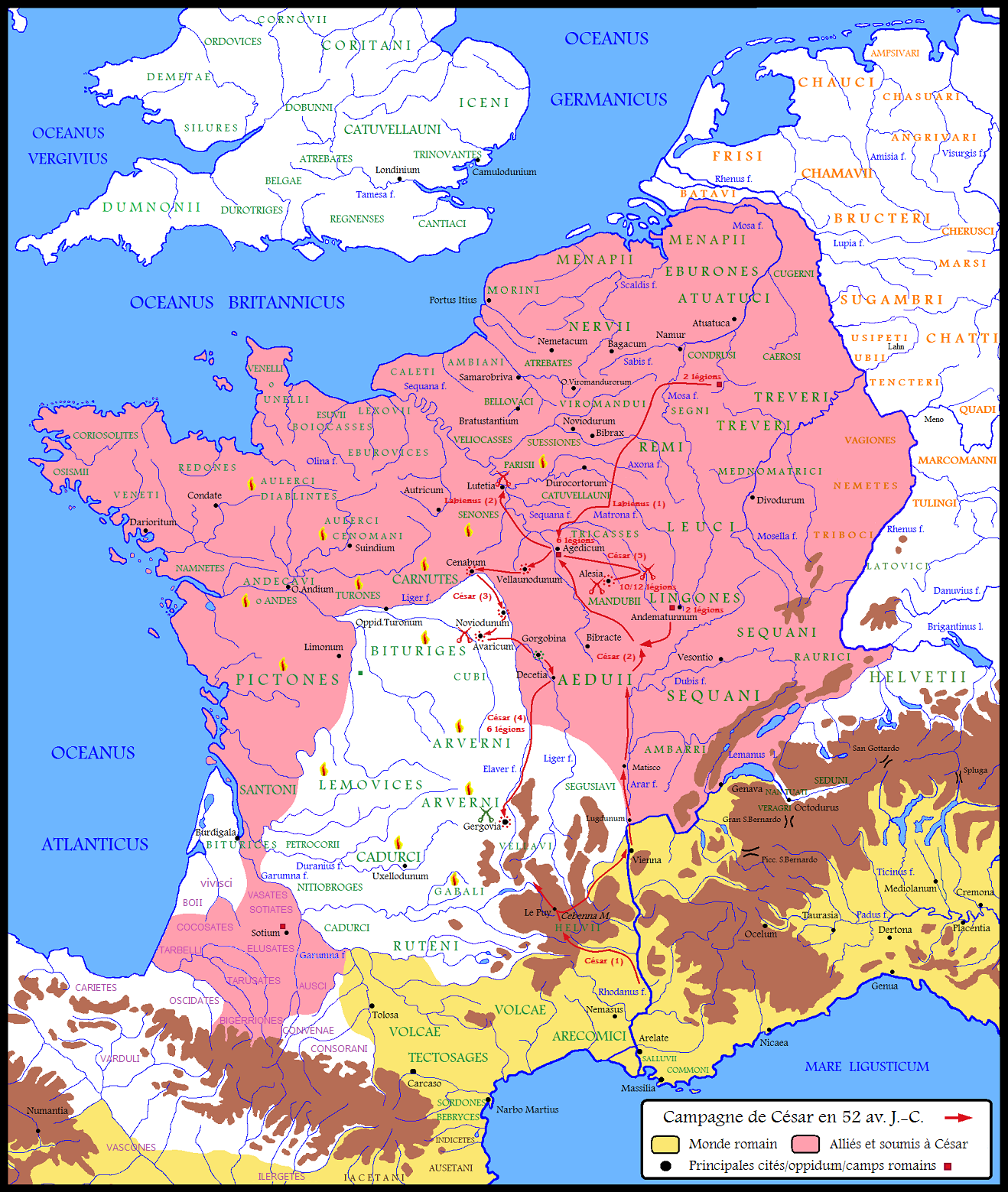
Campaign map 52 BC. Most of southern and central Gaul is in revolt. Note Labienus (2) for Labienus's Lutetia campaign

== Prelude ==
Caesar sent Labienus, with four legions and several auxiliary and allied units – including 2,000 cavalry (Note: Caesar mentions sending Labienus with four legions and 2,000 cavalry. Livius.org mentions Legio VII, IX, XII and XIV.), to campaign against the peoples of the Seine, whilst Caesar himself marched on Gergovia. He captured the oppidum of Metlosedum (possibly present-day Melun), and crossed the Seine to attack the Gallic coalition near Lutetia. Threatened by the Bellovaci (a powerful Belgae tribe), he decided to re-cross the Seine to rejoin Caesar's force at Agedincum (Sens). Feinting a general retreat, Labienus in fact crossed the river. The Gauls of the Seine coalition tried to block his path to Caesar and battle was joined.

== Battle ==
After the two sides engaged the Seventh legion, placed on the right wing, started to push back the Gallic left. On the Roman left the Twelfth legion's pilum volleys broke up the Gauls first charge, but they resisted the Romans advance, encouraged by their old chieftain Camulogenus. The turning point came when the military tribunes of the Seventh legion led their legionaries against the enemy rear. The Gauls sent in their reserves, taking a nearby hill, but were unable to reverse the course of the battle and took flight. Their losses increased when the Roman cavalry was sent to pursue them. Labienus's force thus advanced back to Agedincum, recaptured their baggage train along the way.

== Aftermath ==
The Gauls tried to prevent Labienus from returning to Agedincum by blocking him at the Sequana river. Labienus used five cohorts to lure the Gauls away while he himself crossed the Sequana River with three legions. When the Gauls found out there were two Roman armies in the area they split up and pursued both. The main body met Labienus who pinned them down with one legion while surrounding them with the rest. He then annihilated their reinforcements with his cavalry. After linking up with the five cohorts he had used as a diversion, Labienus marched his army back to Agendicum where he met up with Caesar returning from his defeat at Gergovia. The combined Roman army would soon after march from Agendicum to face Vercingetorix's victorious army coming from the south. After defeating the Gauls in the Battle of the Vingeanne near the river of Vingeanne, Caesar pursued them to Alesia where he won a decisive victory over Vercingetorix.
