= Asinia =

Ancient Roman noblewoman

Asinia was a noblewoman of ancient Rome who was the daughter of Gaius Asinius Pollio, who was Roman consul 40 BCE. She probably married Marcus Claudius Marcellus Aeserninus, consul in 22 BCE, and had at least one son, Marcus Claudius Marcellus Aeserninus the younger, who was renowned as a promising rhetorician, having been instructed in rhetoric by his grandfather Asinius.
