= Quintus Aemilius Lepidus =

Roman consul 21 BC

Quintus Aemilius Lepidus (possibly Quintus Aemilius Lepidus Barbula) (fl. 1st century BC) was a Roman senator and military officer who was appointed consul in 21 BC as the colleague of Marcus Lollius.

== Biography ==
Quintus Aemilius Lepidus was a member of the Patrician gens Aemilia and the son of Manius Aemilius Lepidus, who was consul in 66 BC. He was a supporter of Marcus Antonius.

It is assumed that Quintus Aemilius Lepidus was the “Barbula” referred to in Appian’s Civil Wars. In it, Appian recounts that a certain Marcus (assumed to be Marcus Lollius) was a legate of Marcus Junius Brutus the Younger who, after the Battle of Philippi, had been proscribed. Hiding as a slave, he was purchased by Lepidus, whose identity was then revealed by a friend in Rome. Lepidus went to Marcus Vipsanius Agrippa, who interceded on his behalf with Octavianus, who then ensured that Lollius’ name was removed from the proscription lists.

Around 40-38 BC, Lepidus was a Monetalis for Marcus Antonius in Pergamum, minting cistophori on behalf of Antony. Then, in 31 BC, he fought alongside Antony at the Battle of Actium but was captured. He was released only when Marcus Lollius interceded for him before Octavianus, thereby returning the favour.

In the year 21 BC, a second consular position was made available after Augustus decided not to nominate anyone for the office. After a bitter and rancorous election and lengthy disputes with his only competitor, Lucius Junius Silanus, which reached the point that many people were asking for Augustus to return to put an end to it, Lepidus was elected consul, serving alongside his old friend Marcus Lollius. Together, they oversaw the restoration of the Pons Fabricius, one of the bridges that spanned the Tiber River, which had been damaged in the floods of the year before.

Lepidus is recorded as one of the Quindecimviri sacris faciundis who was part of the quorum which participated in the Secular Games of 17 BC; he was probably a member of this group during the civil wars. Finally in about 15 BC, he was the proconsular governor of Asia.

== See also ==
- List of Roman consuls

== Sources ==
- Broughton, T. Robert S., The Magistrates of the Roman Republic, Vol. II (1952)
- Broughton, T. Robert S., The Magistrates of the Roman Republic, Vol. III (1986)
- Syme, Ronald, The Augustan Aristocracy (1986). Clarendon Press
- Tansey, Patrick, "Q. Aemilius Lepidus (Barbula?) Cos. 21 BC", Historia, 57 (2008), pp. 174–207

Political offices
Preceded by Marcus Claudius Marcellus Aeserninus, and Lucius Arruntius	Consul of the Roman Empire; 21 BC with Marcus Lollius	Succeeded by Marcus Appuleius, and Publius Silius Nerva
