= Camulogene =

Gallic chief (died 52 BC)

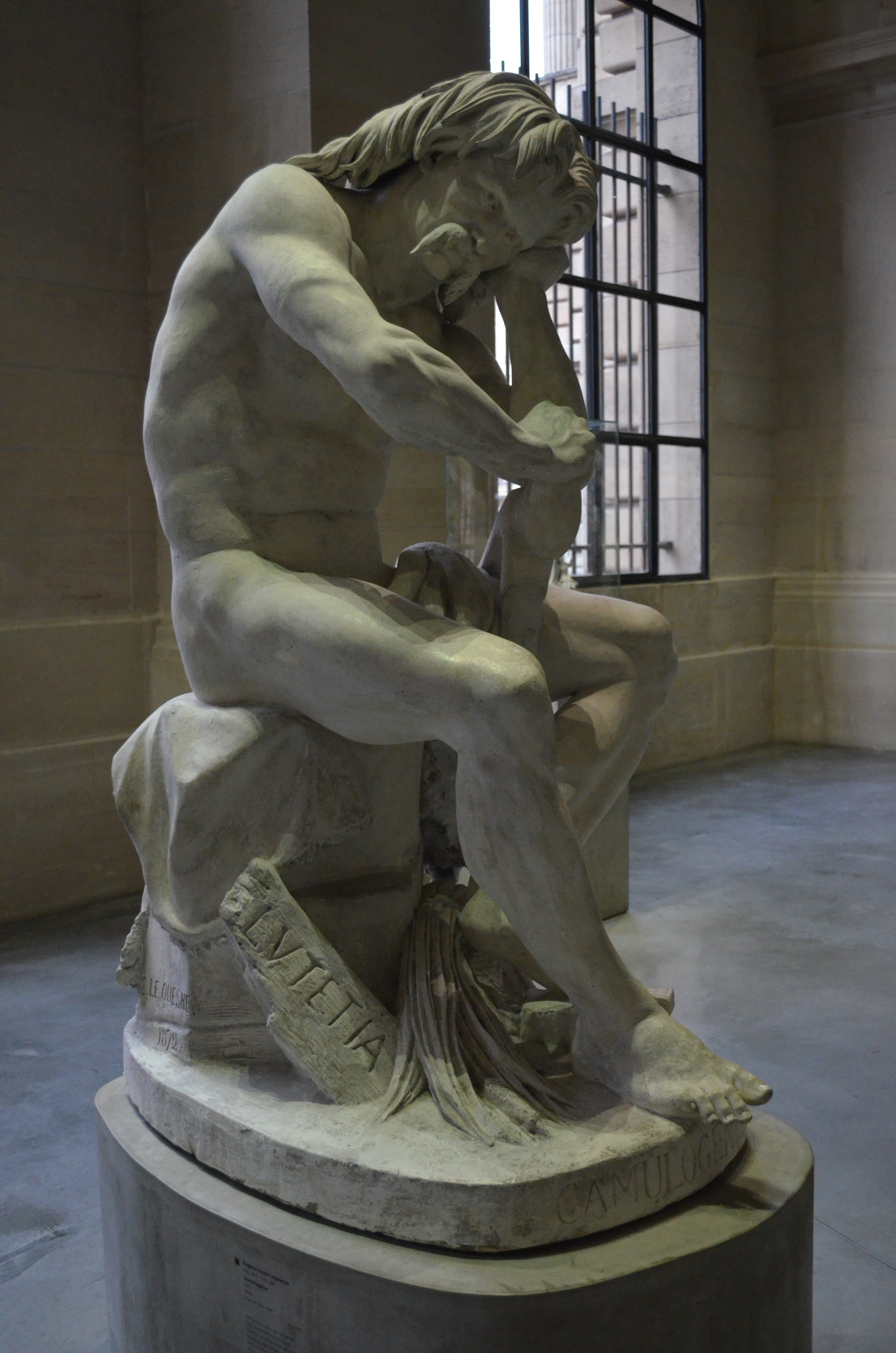
- Camulogene by Eugène-Louis Lequesne (1872), Palais des Beaux-Arts de Lille
- Born: Gaul
- Died: 52 BC; Plain of Grenelle
- Occupation: Military leader
- Military career
- Allegiance: Gallic coalition
- Conflicts: Gallic Wars; Battle of Lutetia †

Camulogene (or Camulogenus, died 52 BC) was a Gallic warrior from one of the Aulerci tribes, a group of Celtic-speaking peoples who resided in northern Gaul in the first-century BC.

During the revolt of Vercingetorix in 52 BC, he would be made leader of an army of Gauls assembled from those who lived along the Seine after Titus Labienus began a campaign to capture the town of Lutetia. Despite Camulogene's use of scorched earth tactics, he would be defeated by Roman forces and killed at the Battle of Lutetia.

== Name ==
The names Camulogene and Camulogenus both derive from the Gaulish *Camulogenos which is likely composed of two elements: *camulo(s) ('champion, servant') and *genos ('birth, descendant').

As the name Camulos is attested in the period, the name may be interpreted as meaning "descendant of Camulos". Some scholars have argued that the name references the Gaulish deity Camulus.

== Biography ==
Little is known of Camulogene's life before the Gallic Wars. In Julius Caesar's Commentarii de Bello Gallico, he is described as an Aulercan elder who possessed an exceptional knowledge of warfare.

After 6 years of Roman invasion and conquest in Gaul, the Gauls would revolt against the Roman occupiers in 52 BC under the leadership of Vercingetorix. Caesar's lieutenant, Titus Labienus, would be sent with 4 legions to campaign along the Seine river. In response, the local Gauls would appoint Camulogene to organize their defense due to his skill and experience.

=== Battle of Lutetia ===
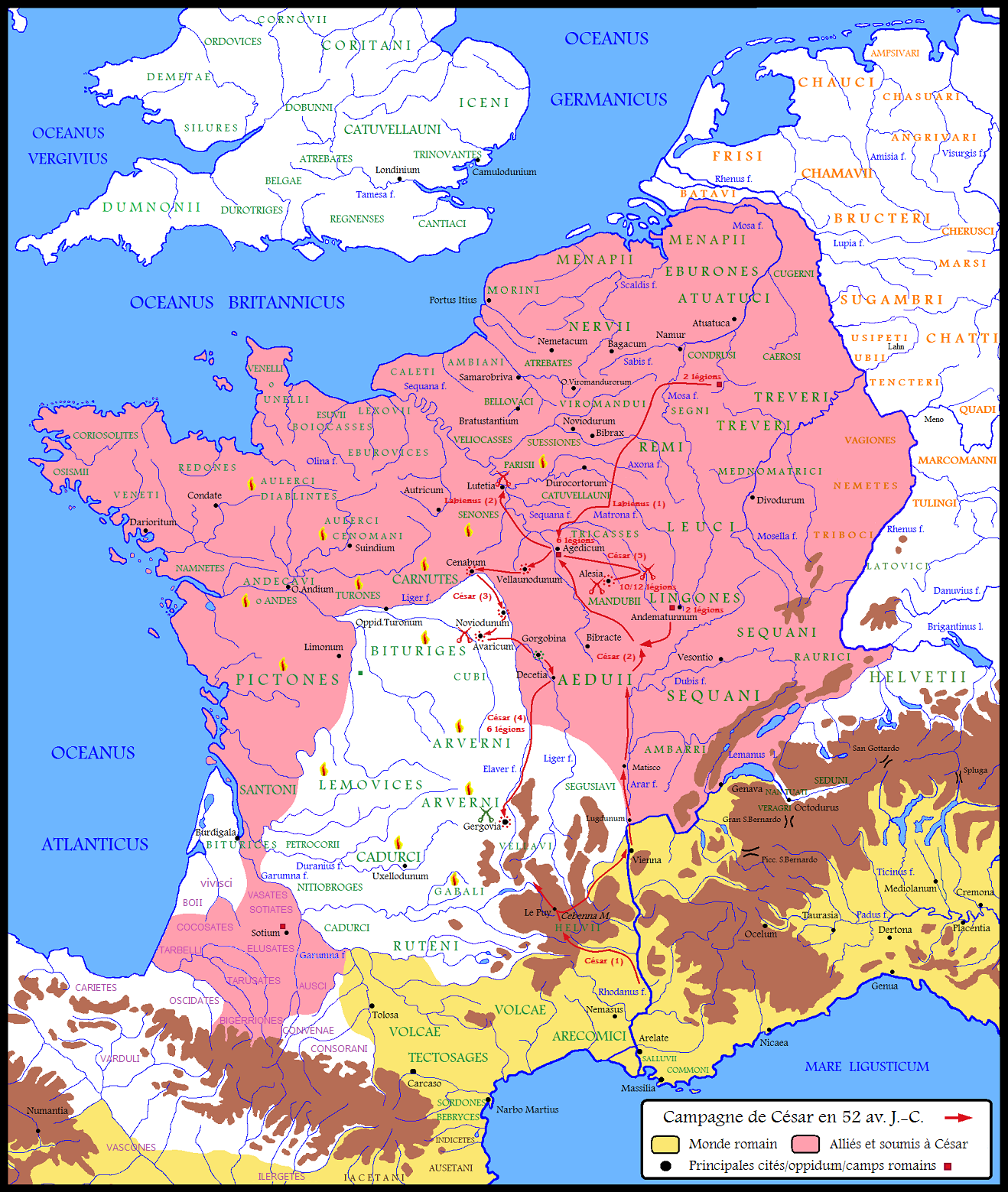
Campaign map 52 BC. Most of southern and central Gaul is in revolt. Note Labienus (2) for Labienus's Lutetia campaign

After the Romans captured the Senonian town of Metiosedum (Melun), Labienus would move to capture the town of Lutetia in the lands of the Parisii. In response, Camulogene adopted a policy of scorched earth tactics and ordered for Lutetia to be burned and its bridges to be cut down. Upon hearing news of Caesar's defeat at Gergovia and learning that the Bellovaci were mobilizing to aid the Gallic forces, Labienus attempted to cross the Seine and move to rejoin Caesar at Agedincum but Camulogene would block his path with the armies meeting on the plain of Grenelle. In the subsequent battle, Camulogene would be killed and his forces dispersed, leaving Labienus free to march back to Agendicum..

== Legacy ==
Following the battle, Lutetia would be rebuilt and develop into a Roman city, gradually developing into the modern city of Paris. Due to his role in Lutetia's history, Camulogene has come to be viewed as a part of Parisian history with the Rue Camulogène named for him. The street is located in the 15th arrondissement of Paris.

== Depictions ==
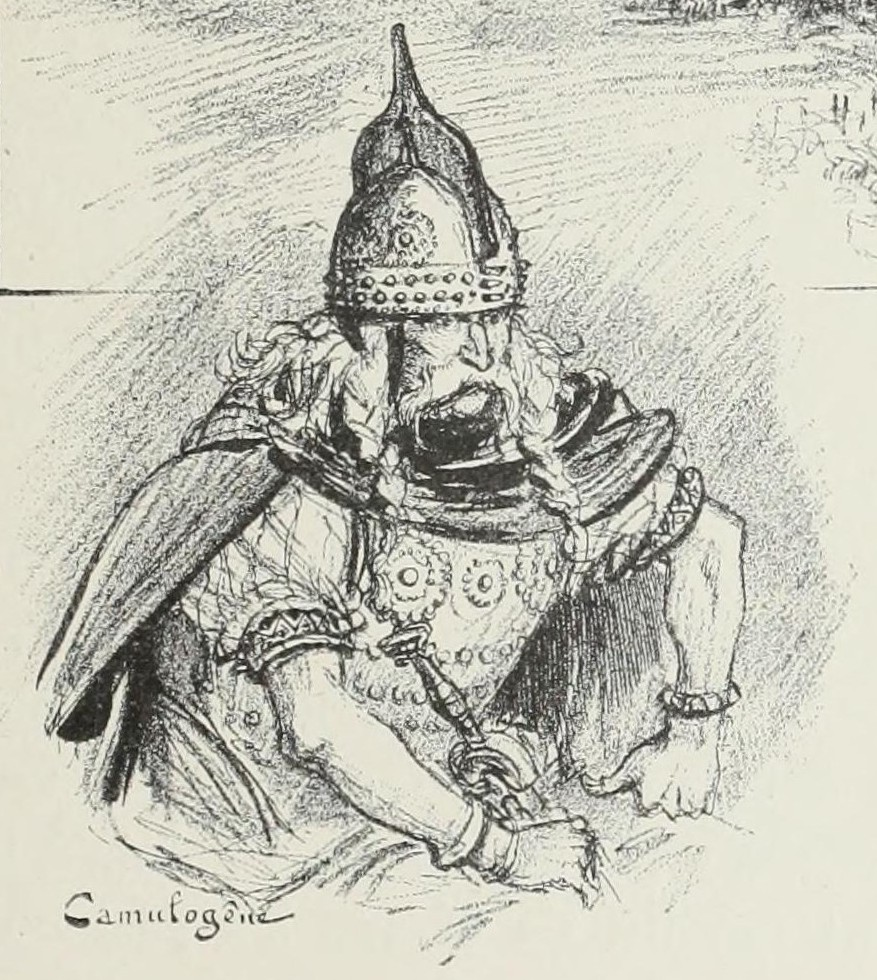
A drawing of Camulogene by Albert Robida (1895)

== Bibliography ==
- Rousseau, Paul. Les héros de Paris (in French). Paris: Librairie Gédalge. p. 310.
- Hofeneder, Andreas (2005). Die Religion der Kelten in den antiken literarischen Zeugnissen. Band I: Von den Anfängen bis Caesar. Mitteilungen der Prähistorischen Kommission 59. Vienna: Verlag der Österreichischen Akademie der Wissenschaften.
- Bouillet. Camulogene. Vol. 1. p. 327.
