= Polio (disambiguation) =

Polio is the common name of poliomyelitis, an acute clinical disease caused by a poliovirus. Polio (also Polios) may also refer to:

== Polio-related terms ==
- Poliovirus, the virus that causes poliomyelitis
- Post-polio syndrome, long term complication of poliomyelitis
- Polio vaccine, a vaccine that induces immunity to one or more types of poliovirus

== See also ==
- Polioencephalomalacia, neurological disease in ruminants, caused by disrupted thiamine production in the body, not related to polioviruses
