= Gaius Asinius Pollio =

Roman politician, historian and writer (75 BC – AD 4)

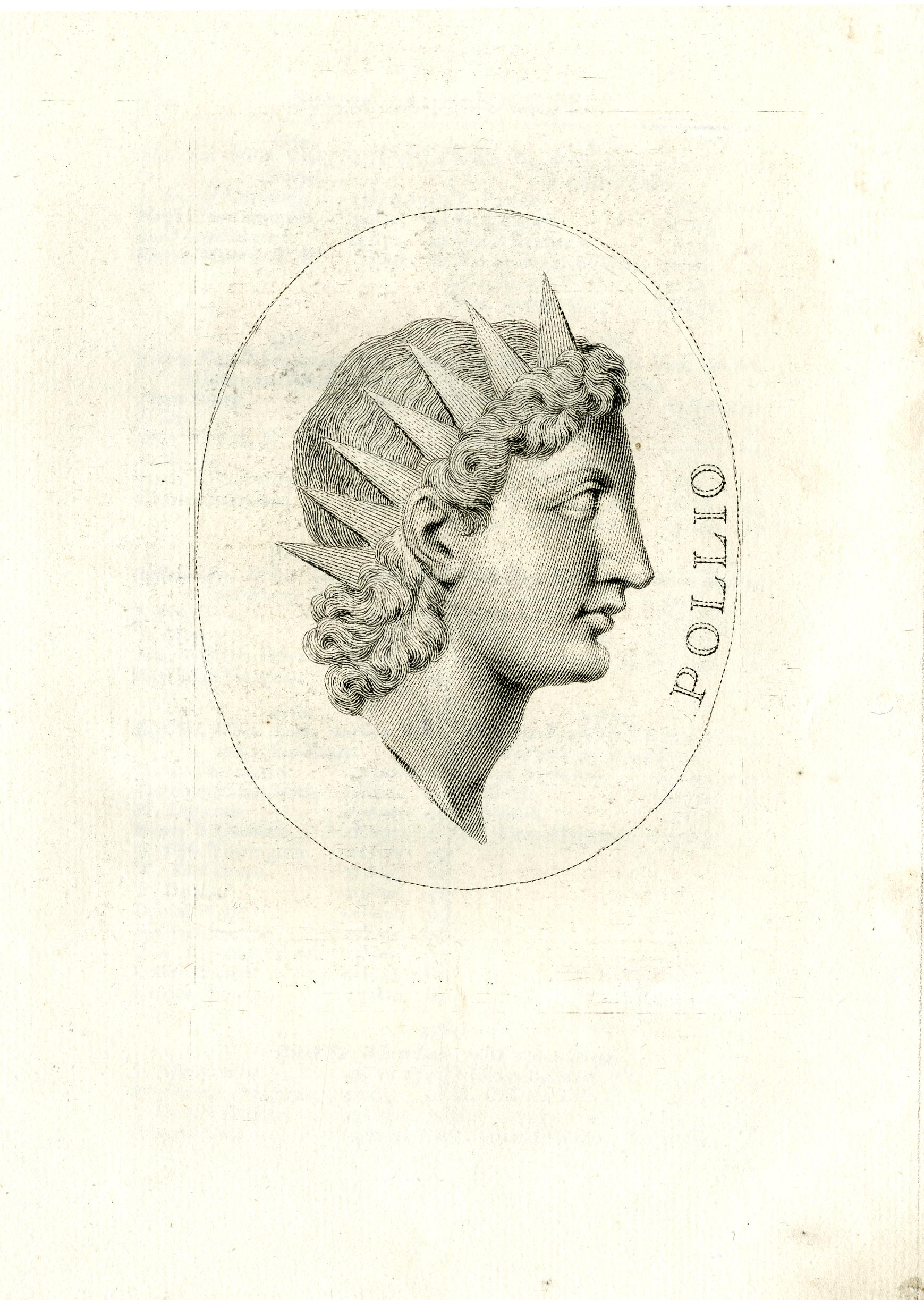
- Imaginary portrait of Pollio by Giovanni Marco Pitteri
- Born: 75 BC; Teate Marrucinorum (modern Chieti, Italy)
- Died: AD 4 (age 79); Possibly in Tusculum, Latium
- Citizenship: Roman
- Occupations: Soldier, politician
- Spouse: Quinctia
- Children: Asinia and Gaius Asinius Gallus
- Relatives: Gnaeus Asinius Pollio (father)
- Writing career
- Language: Classical Latin
- Period: Late 1st century BC
- Genre: History
- Notable work: Lost historical works
- Literary movement: Augustan literature

Gaius Asinius Pollio (75 BC – AD 4) was a Roman soldier, politician, orator, poet, playwright, literary critic, and historian, whose lost contemporaneous history provided much of the material used by the historians Appian and Plutarch. Pollio was most famously a patron of Virgil and a friend of Horace; poems to him were dedicated by both men.

== Early life ==
Asinius Pollio was born in Teate Marrucinorum, the modern Chieti in Abruzzi, central Italy. According to an inscription, his father was called Gnaeus Asinius Pollio. He had a brother named Asinius Marrucinus, whom Catullus calls out for his tasteless practical joke, whose name suggests a family origin among the Marrucini. Pollio may therefore have been the grandson of Herius Asinius, a plebeian and a general of the Marrucini who fought on the Italian side in the Social War.

Pollio moved in the literary circle of Catullus and entered public life in 56 BC by supporting Lentulus Spinther. In 54, he unsuccessfully attempted to impeach Gaius Porcius Cato (a distant relative of the more famous Cato the Younger). Gaius Porcius Cato had acted as the tool of the triumvirs Pompey, Crassus, and Caesar in his tribunate in 56 BC.

== Political career ==
Despite his initial support of Lentulus Spinther in the civil war between Caesar and Pompey, Pollio sided with Caesar. He was present when Caesar deliberated whether to cross the Rubicon river and begin the war. After Pompey and the Senate fled to Greece, Caesar sent Pollio to Sicily to relieve Cato of his command. He and Gaius Scribonius Curio were sent to Africa to fight the province's governor, the Pompeian Publius Attius Varus. Despite the poisoning of the water supply by his opponents, Curio defeated Varus at Utica. Curio marched to face Pompey's ally King Juba of Numidia, and was defeated and killed, along with most of his men, at the Bagradas River. Pollio managed to retreat to Utica with a small force. He was present as Caesar's legate at the Battle of Pharsalus in 48 and recorded Pompeian casualties at 6,000.

In 47 BC, Pollio was probably tribune and resisted the efforts of another tribune, Publius Cornelius Dolabella, to cancel all debts. He returned to Africa the following year, this time with Caesar, in pursuit of Cato and Metellus Scipio.

== Time in Hispania ==
When Caesar was assassinated in 44 BC, Pollio was leading his forces in Hispania against Sextus Pompeius and distinguishing himself early in the campaign. He had accepted the commission reluctantly because of a personal enmity with another of Caesar's allies. Marcus Aemilius Lepidus was appointed the new governor of the province, but Pollio, while remaining loyal to Caesar's supporters, held out against him, announcing at Corduba that he would not hand over his province to anyone who did not have a commission from the Senate. A few months later his quaestor, Lucius Cornelius Balbus, absconded from Gades with the money intended to pay the soldiers and fled to Mauretania. Pollio was then so severely defeated by Pompeius that he had to escape the battlefield in disguise.

== Role in civil war ==
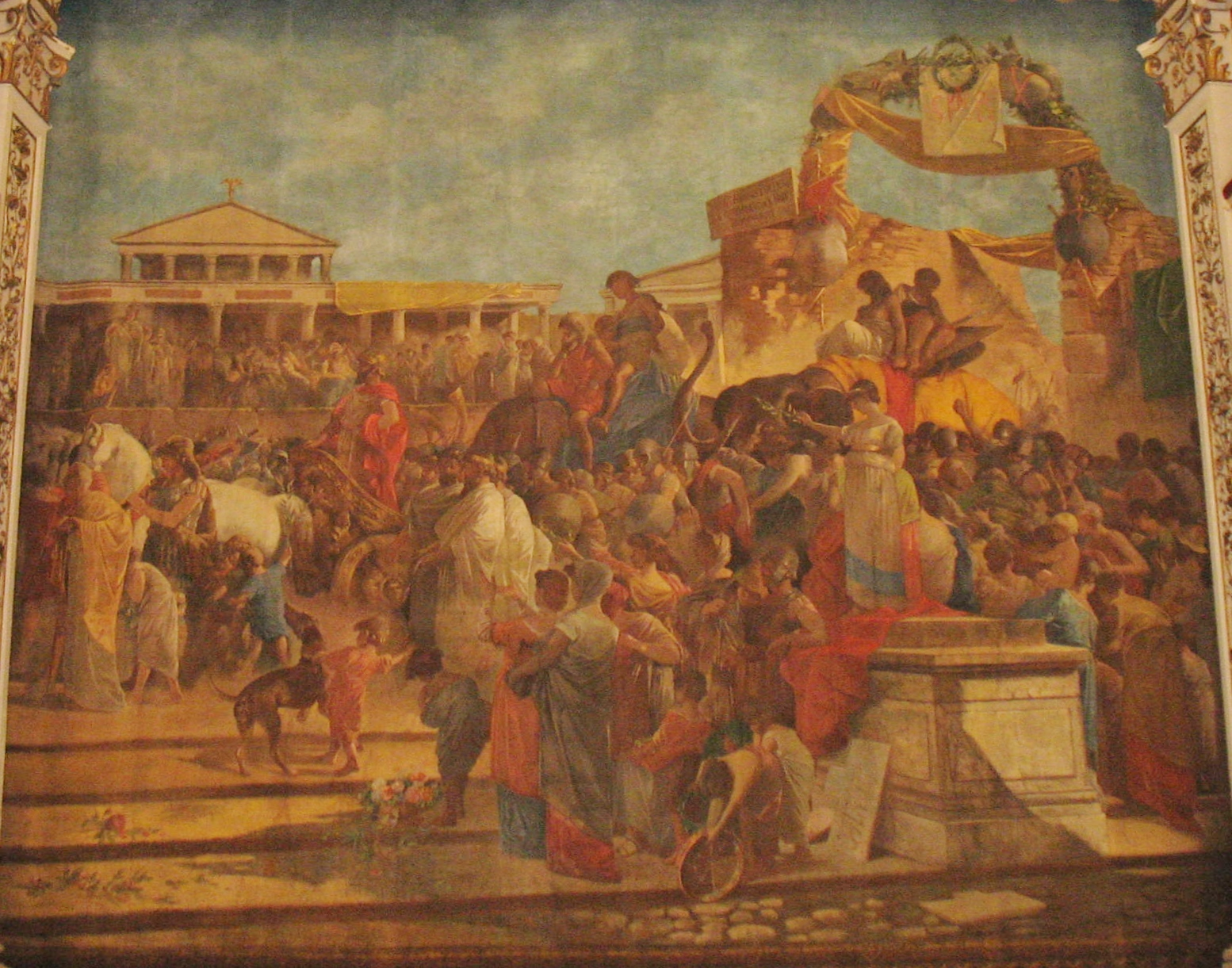
The Triumph of Asinius Pollio (Teatro Marrucino, Chieti)

As civil war brewed between Mark Antony and Octavian, Pollio vacillated, but ultimately supported Mark Antony. Antony, Lepidus, and Octavian soon joined forces in the Second Triumvirate. In their series of bloody proscriptions, Pollio's father-in-law, Lucius Quintius, was one of the first to be marked for assassination. He fled by sea, but committed suicide by throwing himself overboard. In the division of the provinces, Gaul fell to Antony, who entrusted Pollio with the administration of Gallia Transpadana (the part of Cisalpine Gaul between the Po and the Alps). In superintending the distribution of the Mantuan territory amongst the veterans, he used his influence to save the property of the poet Virgil from confiscation.

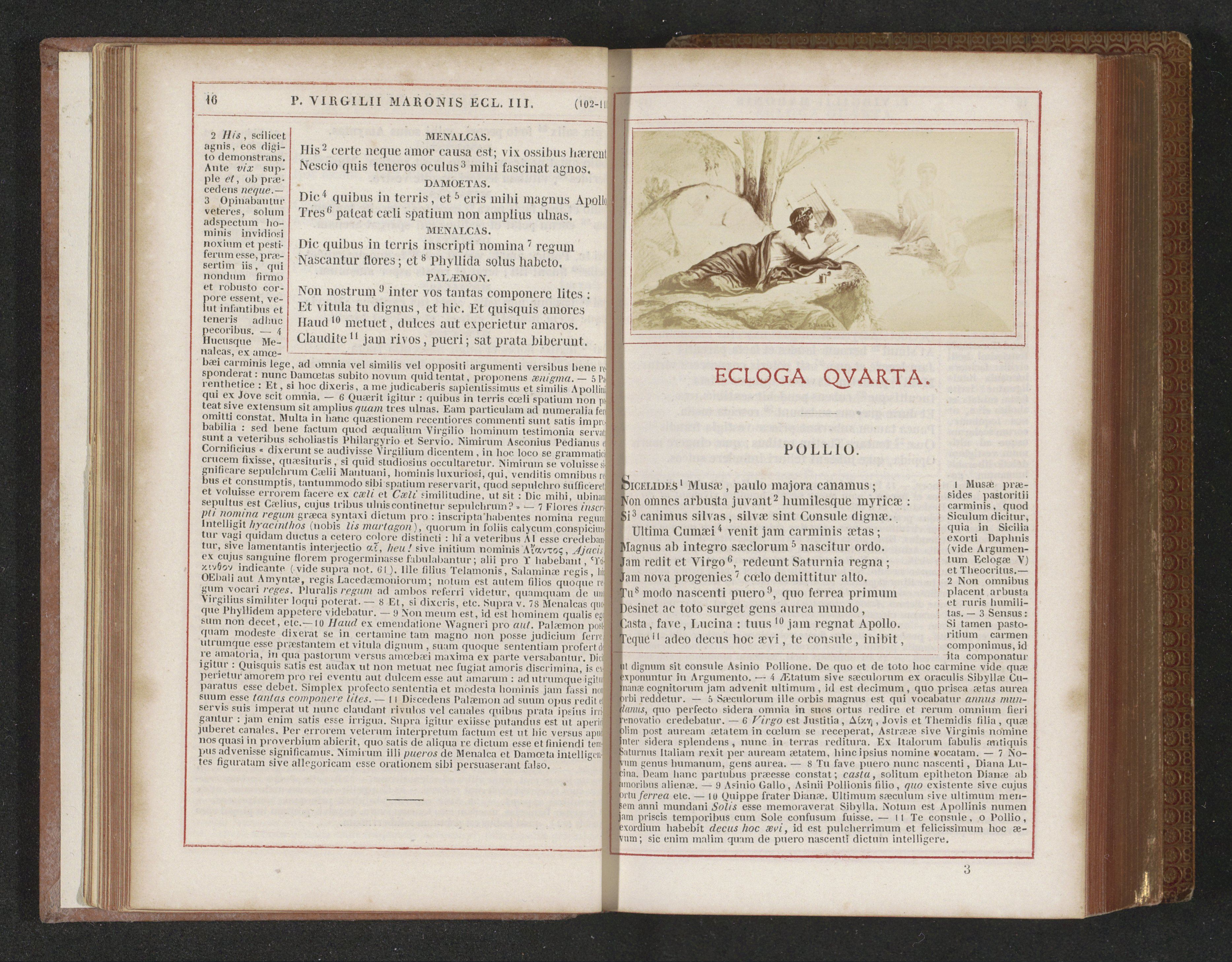
Edition of Virgil with an illustration of him speaking with the Shade of Pollio

In 40, Pollio helped to arrange the peace of Brundisium by which Octavian and Antony were for a time reconciled. In the same year, Pollio entered upon his consulship, which had been promised him in 43 BC by the Second Triumvirate. Virgil addressed the famous fourth eclogue to him, although there is uncertainty regarding whether Virgil composed the poem in anticipation of Pollio's consulship or to celebrate his part in the Treaty of Brundisium. Virgil, like other Romans, hoped that peace was at hand and looked forward to a Golden Age under Pollio's consulship. However, Pollio did not complete his consular year. He and his co-consul were removed from office by Antony and Octavian in the final months of the year.

The following year, Pollio conducted a successful campaign against the Parthini, an Illyrian people who adhered to Marcus Junius Brutus, and celebrated a triumph on 25 October. Virgil's eighth eclogue was addressed to Pollio while he was engaged in this campaign.

In 31 BC, Octavian asked him to take part in the Battle of Actium against Antony, but Pollio, remembering the kindness that Antony had shown him, remained neutral.

== Later life ==
From the spoils of his campaign against the Parthini, Pollio constructed the first public library at Rome, in the Atrium Libertatis, also erected by him, which he adorned with statues of the most celebrated heroes. The library had Greek and Latin wings, and reportedly its establishment posthumously fulfilled one of Caesar's ambitions.

There was an art collection attached to this library. Like the library, the art gallery was open to the public.

After his military and political successes, Pollio appears to have retired into private life as a patron of literary figures and a writer. He was known as a severe literary critic, fond of an archaic style and purity.

In retirement, Pollio organized literary readings where he encouraged authors to read their own work, and he was the first Roman author to recite his own works. One of the most dramatic such readings brought the poet Virgil to the attention of the imperial family, when Virgil read from his work-in-progress the Aeneid, and flattered the imperial family by his portrayal of Aeneas, whom the Julii Caesares believed to be their direct patrilineal ancestor. As a result, Virgil was praised by Augustus.

Pollio may have died in his villa at Tusculum. He was apparently a staunch republican, and thus held himself somewhat aloof from Augustus.

== Personal life ==
Married to Quinctia, daughter of Lucius Quinctius, who was proscribed and committed suicide in 43 BC, Pollio had at least one daughter, Asinia, and one son, Gaius Asinius Gallus, the second husband of Vipsania Agrippina, the daughter of Marcus Vipsanius Agrippa, Augustus's partner, second-in-command, and second son-in-law. Gallus and Vipsania had several sons together, two of whom were full consuls and a third was consul suffectus.

== Legacy ==
Although now lost, Pollio's contemporary history provided much of the material for the historians Appian and Plutarch. As such, he significantly influenced posterity's perception of his time—a key moment in Roman history. According to the poet Horace (Odes 2.1.1–4), he dated the start of the Civil Wars to the consulship of Quintus Metellus Celer in 60 BC.

Johan Rudolph Thorbecke, a Dutch statesman of the nineteenth century, wrote a thesis about Pollio at the University of Leiden.

Pollio makes a cameo appearance in Robert Graves's novel I, Claudius, where he discusses the ethics of writing history with young Claudius and Titus Livius.

== See also ==
- Pollio

== General and cited references ==
- Louis H. Feldman, "Asinius Pollio and Herod's Sons", The Classical Quarterly, New Series, Vol. 35, No. 1 (1985), pp. 240–243.
- Miland Brown, Loot, Plunder, and a New Public Library.
- G. S. Bobinski, (1994). Library Philanthropy. In W. A. Wiegand and D. G. Davis (Eds.), Encyclopedia of Library History. New York: Garland Publishing.

Political offices
Preceded by L. Antonius; P. Servilius Isauricus	Roman consul 40 BC (renounced); With: Gnaeus Domitius Calvinus	Succeeded by L. Cornelius Balbus; P. Canidius Crassus
