= Lucius Licinius Varro Murena =

Roman politician

Lucius Licinius Varro Murena (died 22 BC) was a Roman politician who was accused of conspiring against the emperor Augustus, and executed without a trial.

== Biography ==
Hailing from Lanuvium, Murena was the natural born son of Lucius Licinius Murena, who was Consul in 62 BC. He was adopted by Aulus Terentius Varro, whose name he took. His sister by adoption, Terentia, married Gaius Cilnius Maecenas, the prominent adviser and friend of Augustus and patron of the arts, while his adopted brother Aulus Terentius Varro Murena, was consul designate for the year 23 BC.

He held the position of legate in Syria from 24 BC to 23 BC, when he was replaced by Marcus Vipsanius Agrippa.

In 22 BC, Murena was back in Rome, where he was called on to defend Marcus Primus, the former proconsul (governor) of Macedonia, against charges of waging a war on the Odrysian kingdom of Thrace, whose king was a Roman ally, without prior approval of the Senate. Murena told the court that his client had received specific instructions from the emperor Augustus, ordering him to attack the client state. Later, Primus testified that the orders came from the recently deceased Marcellus, Augustus's heir apparent. Under the Constitutional settlement of 27 BC such orders, had they been given, would have been considered a breach of the Senate's prerogative, as Macedonia was under the Senate's jurisdiction, not the Princeps'. Such an action would have ripped away the veneer of Republican restoration as promoted by Augustus, and exposed his fraud of merely being the first citizen, a first among equals. Even worse, the involvement of Marcellus provided some measure of proof that Augustus's policy was to have the youth take his place as Princeps, instituting a form of monarchy – accusations that had already played out during the crisis of 23 BC.

The situation was so serious, that Augustus himself appeared at the trial, even though he had not been called as a witness. Under oath, Augustus declared that he gave no such order. Murena, disbelieving Augustus's testimony and resentful of his attempt to subvert the trial by using his auctoritas, rudely demanded to know why Augustus had turned up to a trial to which he had not been called; Augustus replied that he came in the public interest. Although Primus was found guilty, some jurors voted to acquit, meaning that not everybody believed Augustus's testimony.

Then, sometime prior to September 1, 22 BC, a certain Castricius provided Augustus with information about a conspiracy led by Fannius Caepio against the Princeps. Murena was named among the conspirators. Learning about charges from his sister Terentia, who in turn had been notified by her husband Maecenas, Murena apparently fled. A court was convened in his absence, with Tiberius acting as prosecutor. The jury found Murena, along with his fellow accused, guilty, but it was not a unanimous verdict. Sentenced to death for treason, Murena was executed as soon as he was captured without ever being given the opportunity to give testimony in his defence.

== Sources ==
=== Ancient ===
- Dio Cassius Roman History (c. 130 AD)
- Strabo Geographica (c. 10 AD)

=== Modern ===
- Ando, Clifford, Imperial ideology and provincial loyalty in the Roman Empire, University of California Press, 2000
- Davies, Mark; Swain, Hilary; Davies, Mark Everson, Aspects of Roman history, 82 BC-AD 14: a source-based approach, Taylor & Francis e-Library, 2010
- Holland, Richard, Augustus, Godfather of Europe, Sutton Publishing, 2005
- Raaflaub, Kurt A.; Toher, Mark, Between republic and empire: interpretations of Augustus and his principate, University of California Press, 1993
- Smith's Dictionary of Roman Biography and Mythology (1873)
- Southern, Pat, Augustus, Routledge, 1998
- Swan, Michael, The Consular Fasti of 23 B.C. and the Conspiracy of Varro Murena, Harvard Studies in Classical Philology, Volume 71, pgs. 235 – 247, Harvard University Press, 1967
- Syme, Ronald, The Roman Revolution, Clarendon Press, Oxford, 1939
- Wells, Colin Michael, The Roman Empire, Harvard University Press, 2004
- Woodman, A. J., Velleius Paterculus: The Caesarian and Augustan Narrative (2.41-93), Cambridge University Press, 2004
