= Valerius Fabianus =

Ancient Roman senator (fl. 62 AD)

Valerius Fabianus (fl. 62 AD) was an ancient Roman senator of the 1st century AD.

Although a man "marked out for a career of promotion", according to Tacitus, he was tried before the Senate in the year 62. The Senate found him guilty for conspiring with Vincius Rufinus, Marcus Antonius Primus, and others, to impose on his aged and wealthy relative, Domitius Balbus, a forged will. Fabianus was removed from the senatorial order by the Lex Cornelia Testamentaria or De Falsis.
