= Lucius Arruntius (consul 22 BC) =

Roman admiral and consul

Lucius Arruntius was a Roman admiral. He saw action during the War with Sextus Pompeius, and the war of Mark Antony and Octavian (later named Augustus). He is most notable for his participation during the Battle of Actium, where he was in command of victorious Augustus' central division. He was also instrumental in convincing Octavian to pardon Gaius Sosius, one of Mark Antony's generals, after his capture. Arruntius was consul in 22 BC as the colleague of Marcus Claudius Marcellus Aeserninus.

== Life ==
Arruntius came of an opulent family at the Volscian city of Atina. His wealth made him a target in the proscriptions of the Second Triumvirate, which he evaded by arming his clientes and slaves then fighting his way to the Italian coast, from whence he sailed to join the forces of Sextus Pompeius. At some point after the Pact of Misenum was concluded in 39 BC, Arruntius was one of several Pompeians who switched sides and became a supporter of Octavian.

Martha Hoffman Lewis included Arruntius among those elevated to patrician status in 29 BC. He attended the Ludi Saeculares in 17 BC according to an inscription as a quindecimviri sacris faciundis. According to Gaius Stern, he appears on the Ara Pacis within the college of the quindecimviri sacris faciundis.

A Lucius Arruntius is also mentioned in Seneca's Epistulae morales ad Lucilium as an imitator of Sallustius' literary style and as the author of a historical work on the Punic War. This could either be the Arruntius mentioned above or his son.

== Family ==
He had a son, Lucius Arruntius, consul AD 6, who played a prominent role in the Senate after Augustus died.

== Sources ==
- Hoyos, B. (1989). A Forgotten Roman Historian: L. Arruntius and the ‘True’ Causes of the First Punic War. Antichthon, 23, 51–66. doi:10.1017/S0066477400003683
- Martha Hoffman Lewis, The Official Priests of Rome under the Julio-Claudians. A Study of the Nobility from 44 B.C. to 68 A.D., Rome 1955.
- Gaius Stern, Women Children and Senators on the Ara Pacis Augustae, University of California Berkeley dissertation 2006.

Political offices
Preceded by Augustus XI; Gn. Calpurnius Piso	Consul of the Roman Empire; 22 BC with M. Claudius Marcellus Aeserninus	Succeeded by Marcus Lollius; Q. Aemilius Lepidus
