= Varro Atacinus =

Roman writer and poet

Publius Terentius Varro Atacinus (Latin: [ˈpuːbliʊs tɛˈrɛntiʊs ˈwarːoː atakiːnʊs]; 82 – c. 35 BC) was a Roman poet, more polished in his style than the more famous and learned Varro Reatinus, his contemporary, and therefore more widely read by the Augustan writers. He was born in the province of Gallia Narbonensis, the southern part of Gaul with its capital at Narbonne, on the river Atax (now the Aude), for his cognomen Atacinus indicates his birthplace. Varro Atacinus was also in the neoteric circle, which included other notable poets such as Catullus and Marcus Furius Bibaculus.

== Writings ==
Only fragments of his works survive. His first known works are Bellum sequanicum, a poem on Julius Caesar's campaign against Ariovistus, and some satires; these should not be confused with the Menippean Satires of the other Varro, of which some 600 fragments survive. He also wrote a geographical poem, Chorographia; Ephemeris, a hexameter poem on weather-signs after Aratus, from which Virgil has borrowed; and (late in life) elegies to his lover Leucadia.

His translation of the Alexandrian poet Apollonius Rhodius' Argonautica into Latin has some fine surviving lines; and was singled out for praise by Ovid: "Of Varro too what age will not be told/And Jason's Argo and the fleece of gold?". Oskar Seyffert considered that the poem to have been "the most remarkable production in the domain of narrative epic poetry between the time of Ennius and that of Vergil".

Of Varro's fragments, the epigram on "The Tombs of the Great" is well-known; whether or not it is truly Varro's is debatable:

Marmoreo Licinus tumulo iacet, at Cato nullo,
Pompeius paruo: credimus esse deos?

Translation:

In a marble tomb [the freedman] Licinus lies; yet Cato lies in none
and Pompey in but a small: do we believe there are gods?

== Patrons ==
Cicero as well as Caesar have been suggested as possible patrons of Varro's writings.

== See also ==
- Ennius
- Priscian
