= Aulus Terentius Varro Murena =

Roman general and politician

Aulus Terentius Varro Murena (died 24 BC) was a Roman general and politician of the 1st century BC.

== Biography ==
Murena was the natural born son of Aulus Terentius Varro, and adopted brother to Lucius Licinius Varro Murena. He was well connected to the Augustan regime, with his sister, Terentia, married to Gaius Maecenas, the prominent adviser and friend of Augustus and patron of the arts, while his half-brother, Gaius Proculeius, was an intimate friend of Augustus during his rise to power.

Augustus dispatched Murena to lead an expedition against the Salassi tribe of the Aosta Valley region in the northwestern Alps in 25 BC. The Salassi had proved troublesome to Roman armies using the Great St Bernard pass, which, as the shortest route from Italy to the Upper Rhine river, had become strategically vital to the Romans since the completion of Julius Caesar's conquest of Gaul in 51 BC. The Salassi were utterly defeated and, according to Strabo, Murena deported and sold into slavery 44,000 tribespeople. According to Cassius Dio, he sold only males of military age and only for an indenture-term of 20 years. In 24 BC, Murena established a Roman colony of 3,000 settlers in the heart of Salassi country - Augusta Praetoria Salassorum (Aosta, Italy).

Murena was nominated to be Consul, with Augustus, for the year 23 BC, but died shortly before his term in office began. His replacement was Gnaeus Calpurnius Piso. Shortly after Murena's death, his brother by adoption, Lucius Licinius Varro Murena, was accused of conspiring with Fannius Caepio against Augustus.

== Sources ==
=== Ancient ===
- Dio Cassius Roman History (c. 130 AD)
- Strabo Geographica (c. 10 AD)

=== Modern ===
- Ando, Clifford, Imperial ideology and provincial loyalty in the Roman Empire, University of California Press, 2000
- Davies, Mark; Swain, Hilary; Davies, Mark Everson, Aspects of Roman history, 82 BC-AD 14: a source-based approach, Taylor & Francis e-Library, 2010
- Raaflaub, Kurt A.; Toher, Mark, Between republic and empire: interpretations of Augustus and his principate, University of California Press, 1993
- Smith's Dictionary of Roman Biography and Mythology (1873)
- Swan, Michael, The Consular Fasti of 23 B.C. and the Conspiracy of Varro Murena, Harvard Studies in Classical Philology, Volume 71, pgs. 235 – 247, Harvard University Press, 1967
- Syme, Ronald, The Roman Revolution, Clarendon Press, Oxford, 1939
- Wells, Colin Michael, The Roman Empire, Harvard University Press, 2004
