= Titus Labienus =

Roman military officer (c.100 BC–45 BC)

- Born: c. 100 BC; Cingulum, Picenum, Italy
- Died: 17 March 45 BC (aged c. 55); Battle of Munda
- Cause of death: Killed in battle
- Occupations: Soldier and politician
- Office: Tribune of the plebs (63 BC); Praetor (60/59 BC)
- Children: Quintus Labienus
- Military career
- Allegiance: Julius Caesar (58–49 BC); Pompey (49–45 BC)
- Branch: Roman army
- Rank: Legate
- Wars: Gallic Wars; Caesar's Civil War

Titus Labienus (c. 100 BC – 17 March 45 BC) was a high-ranking military officer in the late Roman Republic. He served as tribune of the Plebs in 63 BC. Although mostly remembered as one of Julius Caesar's best lieutenants in Gaul and mentioned frequently in the accounts of his military campaigns, Labienus chose to oppose him during the Civil War, and he was killed at Munda. He was the father of Quintus Labienus.

== Biography ==
=== Early career ===
As his praetorship was in 60 or 59 BC, Titus Labienus most likely was born around 100 BC. Many sources suggest that he came from the town of Cingulum in Picenum. His family was of equestrian status. He most likely had early ties with Pompey during his time as a patron for Picenum, also because of his desire to rise in military ranks. His early service was c. 78–75 BC in Cilicia under Publius Servilius Vatia Isauricus fighting pirates and the Isaurian hill tribes.

=== Tribune of the Plebs, Trial of Gaius Rabirius ===
In 63 BC, Titus Labienus was a tribune of the Plebs with close ties to Pompey. Gaius Julius Caesar was also working closely with Pompey and therefore he and Labienus occasionally cooperated, developing into a friendship between both men.

At Caesar's instigation, Labienus accused Gaius Rabirius of high treason (perduellio) for the murder of the tribune Lucius Appuleius Saturninus and of his uncle Titus Labienus in 100 BC. The purpose of this trial was to discredit the so-called "final decree of the Senate" (senatus consultum ultimum), an emergency measure of the senate commonly used against the Populares and the Roman assemblies. Labienus used the antiquated procedure of the duumviri, used in the early republic, against Rabirius. The procedure bypassed normal criminal law and Rabirius would be tried without defense. Since tribunes were sacrosanct, it was seen as an act against the gods to kill one. Thus punishment of the culprit was seen as more of a cleansing to appease the gods. The killing was seen as a pollution so profound that a normal criminal trial was unnecessary and immediate cleansing was necessary to avoid the wrath of the gods. The duumviri were assigned to accuse under the pretense of obvious guilt and cleanse the culprit through scourging.

Rabirius appealed to the Centuriate Assembly and Cicero spoke in his defense. However, before the assembly could vote, Metellus Celer used his powers as an augur to claim the sightings of bad omens and take down the flag in Janiculum, sabotaging the process and forcing a re-trial. Rabirius was ultimately sentenced to exile, as he was unable to pay an unreasonable fine.

Most significantly, in the same year, Labienus carried a plebiscite returning the elections of the pontifices to the people. Caesar then ultimately swept the subsequent election for Pontifex maximus when it came time to replace deceased Metellus Pius (Dio Cassius xxxvii. 37).

Labienus then had to serve as praetor in either 60 or 59 BC, as he was appointed Caesar's legatus pro praetore in Cisalpine Gaul through Lex Vatinia.

Labienus was more a soldier than politician and primarily used his office as a gateway to secure himself positions of high military command.

=== Lieutenant under Caesar in Gaul ===
As Caesar's senior legate during his campaign in Gaul, Labienus was the only legate mentioned by name in Caesar's writings about his first campaign. He was a skilled cavalry commander.

Labienus commanded the winter quarters in Vesontio in 58 BC. He also had full command of the legions in Gaul during Caesar's absence, as his legatus pro praetore. He had this privilege when Caesar was administering justice in Cisalpine Gaul as well as during Caesar's second campaign in Britain (in 54 BC).

In 57 BC, during the Belgian campaign, in a battle against the Atrebates and Nervii near Sabis, Labienus, commanding the 9th and 10th legions, defeated the opposing Atrebates force and proceeded to take the enemy camp. From there he sent the 10th Legion against the rear of the Nervii line while they were engaged with the rest of Caesar's army, single-handedly turning the tide of battle and securing Caesar the victory.

Labienus is also credited with the defeat of the Treviri under Indutiomarus. Labienus spent days with his army fortified in their camp, while Indutiomarus harassed him daily in an attempt at intimidation and demoralization. Labienus waited for the right moment, when Indutiomarus and his forces were returning to their camp disorganized, to send out his cavalry through two gates. He gave them the orders to first kill Indutiomarus, then his trailing forces on their return. Labienus's men were successful, and with the death of their leader, the Treviri army scattered. The Treviri forces later regrouped under relatives of Indutiomarus and moved upon Labienus, setting up camp across the river from his legions, waiting for reinforcements from the Germans. Labienus feigned a withdrawal, enticing the Treviri to cross the river, after which he turned around and had his men attack. Being in such a disadvantageous position, the Treviri forces were shattered. After hearing this, the German reinforcements turned around.

Labienus's victory over the Parisii commanded by Camulogene at Lutetia in the Battle of Lutetia is another example of his tactical genius. Sending five cohorts back towards Agedincum, and himself crossing the Sequana River with three legions, he tricked the enemy into thinking that he had divided his army and was crossing the river in three places. The enemy army split into thirds and pursued Labienus. The main body met Labienus which he subsequently surrounded with the rest of his legions. He then annihilated the reinforcements with his cavalry.

In September, 51 BC, Caesar made Labienus governor of Cisalpine Gaul.

=== Defection from Caesar, command under Pompey in Civil War ===
After Caesar crossed the Rubicon, Labienus left his post in Cisalpine Gaul and joined Pompey. He was rapturously welcomed on the Pompeian side, bringing some Gallic and German cavalry with him. He also brought an account on Caesar's military strength.

Pompey made Labienus commander of the cavalry (magister equitum). Labienus attempted to persuade Pompey to face Caesar in Italy and not retreat to Hispania (Iberian Peninsula, comprising modern Spain and Portugal) to regroup, insisting that Caesar's army was thin and weakened after his campaign in Gaul.

But Labienus's ill fortune under Pompey was as marked as his success had been under Caesar. From the defeat at the Battle of Pharsalus, where he commanded the cavalry, he fled to Corcyra, and after hearing of the death of Pompey then proceeded to Africa. He created confidence in the followers of Pompey by lying to them, claiming that Caesar had received a mortal wound at the Battle of Pharsalus. He was able through sheer force of numbers to inflict a slight check upon Caesar at the Battle of Ruspina in 46 BC. By arranging his troops into dense formations, he tricked Caesar into thinking he had only foot soldiers, and was able to rout Caesar's cavalry and surround his army. However, Labienus was unable to defeat Caesar's forces, and was compelled to leave the field. After the defeat at the Battle of Thapsus, he joined the younger Gnaeus Pompeius in Hispania.

Death came to Labienus in the Battle of Munda, an evenly matched conflict between the armies of Caesar and the sons of Pompey. King Bogud, an ally of Caesar, approached the Pompeians with his army from the rear. Labienus was commanding the Pompeians' cavalry unit at the time, and seeing this, took the cavalry from the front lines to meet him. The Pompeian legions misinterpreted this as a retreat, became disheartened and began to break. Pompeians suffered massive casualties during the rout, in which Labienus himself was killed. This defeat ended Caesar's Civil War. According to Appian, (BC2.105), his head was brought to Caesar, who then dispatched men to locate the body of his old friend, and buried him with full honours.

== Fictional accounts ==
- Labienus is featured in The Gods of War, a novel by British author Conn Iggulden, though in a much reduced role, as his historical position as Caesar's second-in-command is filled instead by Marcus Junius Brutus, whose relationship with Caesar is conversely greatly expanded.
- Labienus was an important minor character in the earlier Masters of Rome novels by Australian author Colleen McCullough. In these, his first appearance is in the Trial of Rabirius, but this is placed rather later in the political year than it is usually stated as having been, orchestrated by Caesar as a reaction to Cicero's decision to have several Catiline conspirators executed without trial while the "Senatus Consultum Ultimum" is in force – rather than as a prior warning against such an action before the decree was even in place. He then falls on hard times because he had drawn the disfavour of Pompey for having an affair with his wife Mucia Tertia, the daughter of Quintus Mucius Scaevola Pontifex, the pontifex maximus and consul in 95 BC, and thus a member of Rome's nobility that he moved to his vast estates in Picenum. He is portrayed latterly as a very capable but fierce and cruel soldier and commander, whose brilliance wins battles in Gaul, but whose brutality went some way towards alienating Caesar's Gallic allies and thus causing the battles in the first place. McCullough takes a somewhat different interpretation of the events, and has Caesar shunning Labienus, instead of Labienus defecting to Pompey. In the novels, Caesar disowns Labienus when it comes to civil war, not wanting him on his side because he is too cruel and unpredictable.
- Labienus was also featured in the BBC One docudrama Ancient Rome: The Rise and Fall of an Empire.
- Labienus is a significant character in S.J.A. Turney's series Marius' Mules.
- Labienus features in the campaign of the video game Praetorians. He is a playable character in several missions set in the Gallic Wars to finally re-emerge as the main antagonist in the last mission set at the end of the Civil War. In the game's version of events, Labienus did not die in the Battle of Munda, but has managed to flee to the Pompeian encampment where he makes his final stand.
- In the 2021 series Dogmatix and the Indomatibles, based on the world-famous Asterix comics, Labienus is featured as the accomplished conqueror and de facto ruler of Lutetia, now known as Paris, in 52 B.C., similar to his real-life counterpart. In the show, Labienus owns a siamese cat named Monalisa, whom Dogmatix opposes.

== See also ==
- Labiena (gens)
