= Poppaea gens =

Ancient Roman family

The gens Poppaea was a minor plebeian family at ancient Rome. Members of this gens first appear under the early Empire, when two brothers served as consuls in AD 9. The Roman empress Poppaea Sabina was a descendant of this family, but few others achieved any prominence in the Roman state. A number of Poppaei are known from inscriptions. The name is sometimes confused with that of Pompeia.

== Origin ==
The consul Gaius Poppaeus Sabinus is said to have come from an undistinguished family, and to have owed his lengthy career more to his competence than his brilliance. There is little evidence of the Poppaei prior to the first century, but from inscriptions the family seems to have been concentrated in Campania. The cognomen Sabinus used by the most prominent branch of the gens suggests that they claimed Sabine ancestry. The region of Campania where the greatest number of Poppaei are found was associated with the Samnites, an Oscan-speaking people who also claimed Sabine descent. The family of empress Poppaea Sabina seems to have come from Pompeii.

== Praenomina ==
The chief praenomina of the Poppaei were Gaius and Quintus, both of which were used by the most prominent stirps the Poppaei Sabini. A few members of the gens also used other names, such as Publius, Lucius, Sextus, and Titus. All of these were common names throughout Roman history. A single use of the rare praenomen Potitus among the Sabini is also attested, this name was most commonly used by the Valerii (although as a cognomen).

== Members ==
This list includes abbreviated praenomina. For an explanation of this practice, see filiation.

- Poppaeus Silvanus, a man of consular rank, and the governor of Dalmatia at the death of Nero, is probably to be identified with Marcus Pompeius Silvanus, consul in AD 45 under the emperor Claudius, and later a prominent supporter of Vespasian.
- Lucius Poppaeus Vopiscus, consul suffectus ex Kal. Mart. in AD 69, should probably be read "Lucius Pompeius Vopiscus".
- Poppaea, a freedwoman buried at Rome.
- Gaius Poppaeus, buried at Mevania in Umbria.
- Gnaeus Poppaeus, named in a funerary inscription from Mevania.
- Quintus Poppaeus Q. f., patron of the colony at Interamnia Praetuttiorum.
- Publius Poppaeus T. f., named in an inscription from Casinum.
- Gaius Poppaeus Aprilis, trierarch, or commander of a trireme in the Roman navy, married Eppia Prima. He was buried at Rome, aged thirty.
- Gaius Poppaeus Aptorus, named in a funerary inscription from Rome.
- Quintus Poppaeus Blastus, named in an inscription from Stabiae in Campania.
- Gaius Poppaeus Botryo, buried at Rome, aged forty.
- Gaius Poppaeus Celer, named in an inscription from Stabiae.
- Poppaea Demetria, wife of Titus Fundanius Eromenus, buried at Rome during the second century.
- Poppaea Fausta, named in an inscription from Rome.
- Poppaea Q. l. Fausta, a freedwoman named in an inscription from Stabiae.
- Gaius Poppaeus C. l. Felicio, a freedman named in an inscription from Stabiae.
- Quintus Poppaeus Firmus, named in an inscription from Pompeii.
- Poppaea Triquinia (or Tarquinia), named in a graffiti from Pompeii. Possibly a member of the Poppaei Sabini or a freedwoman of theirs. The fact that the text included her full name may imply that she came from a family of high social status.
- Gaius Poppaeus Gemellus, buried at Ficulea (now a suburb of Rome), aged ninety years, three months, two days, with a monument from his son, Poppaeus Primigenius.
- Poppaea Hermione, buried at Rome; Gaius Poppaeus Iaso dedicated a monument to her.
- Gaius Poppaeus Hymetus, a resident of Stabiae.
- Gaius Poppaeus Iaso, dedicated a monument to Poppaea Hermione.
- Poppaea Ilias, named in a sepulchral inscription from Rome.
- Poppaea Januaria, client of Galus Poppaeus Januarius, to whom she dedicated a monument at Rome.
- Gaius Poppaeus Januarius, patron of Poppaea Januaria, who dedicated a monument to him at Rome.
- Gaius Poppaeus C. l. Lamyrus, a freedman named in an inscription from Rome.
- Publius Poppaeus P. f. Magnus, named in an inscription from Casinum.
- Poppaeus C. f. Primigenius, dedicated a monument at Ficulea to his father, Gaius Poppaeus Gemellus.
- Poppaea Prisci l., a freedwoman named in an inscription from Pompeii.
- Gaius Poppaeus Priscus, one of the duumviri at Veii in AD 256.
- Poppaea C. f. Procca, buried at Abellinum in Campania, aged eight years, four months.
- Sextus Poppaeus Thalamus, husband of Fulvia Felicula, buried at Sublaqueum, in a sepulchre built by his stepson.
- Poppaea Trophime, wife of Lucius Afinius Ampliatus, buried at Rome, aged twenty-one.
- Lucius Poppaeus Urbanus, named in an inscription from Abella in Campania, dating to AD 28.
- Gaius Poppaeus Valens, built a sepulchre at Rome for himself, Poppaea Ilias, and Aviania Charis.
- Poppaea Veneria, wife of Marcus Flavius Cosmos, to whom she dedicated a monument at Rome.
- Poppaea Verina, daughter of Titus Flavius Vestalis, to whom she dedicated a monument at Rome.

=== Poppaei Sabini ===
- Quintus Poppaeus, grandfather of the consuls Sabinus and Secundus.
- Quintus Poppaeus Q. f., father of the consuls Sabinus and Secundus. He was a patron of Interamnia with his brother.
- Gaius Poppaeus Q. f., uncle of the consuls Sabinus and Secundus. He was a patron of Interamnia with his brother.
- Gaius Poppaeus Q. f. Q. n. Sabinus, consul in AD 9, and afterward governor of Moesia, Achaea, and Macedonia until his death in AD 35. He received the triumphal ornaments for his victory over the Thracians in AD 26. He was the maternal grandfather of Poppaea Sabina, second wife of Emperor Nero.
- Quintus Poppaeus Q. f. Q. n. Secundus, consul suffectus ex Kal. Jul. in AD 9, during the latter part of the reign of Augustus, was one of the authors of the lex Papia Poppaea, a law intended to discourage adultery and encourage lawful marriage.
- Quintus Poppaeus Sabinus, magistrate with Gaius Vibius Secundus in Pompeii. His house, known as the "Casa del Menandro", has been preserved.
- Poppaea C. f. Sabina, married Titus Ollius, by whom she was the mother of (Ollia) Poppaea Sabina, the mistress and second wife of Nero. Her husband was implicated in the intrigues of Sejanus, and put to death. Poppaea's second husband was Publius Cornelius Lentulus Scipio, consul in AD 24. Poppaea's daughter was said to have inherited her great beauty from her mother.
- Gaius Poppaeus Sabinianus, praefectus annonae (c. 62-c. 65), according to an inscription at Ostia. Perhaps an uncle of the empress Sabina.
- Potitus Poppaeus Sabinus, a shop owner attested from a seal (sugello) in Pompeii.
- Gaius Poppaeus Sabinianus, mention in brickstamps from the early 2nd-century.

== See also ==
- List of Roman gentes

== Bibliography ==
- Gaius Plinius Secundus (Pliny the Elder), Naturalis Historia (Natural History).
- Publius Cornelius Tacitus, Annales, Historiae.
- Gaius Suetonius Tranquillus, De Vita Caesarum (Lives of the Caesars, or The Twelve Caesars).
- Plutarchus, Lives of the Noble Greeks and Romans.
- Lucius Cassius Dio Cocceianus (Cassius Dio), Roman History.
- Dictionary of Greek and Roman Biography and Mythology, William Smith, ed., Little, Brown and Company, Boston (1849).
- Theodor Mommsen et alii, Corpus Inscriptionum Latinarum (The Body of Latin Inscriptions, abbreviated CIL), Berlin-Brandenburgische Akademie der Wissenschaften (1853–present).
- Dictionary of Greek and Roman Antiquities, William Smith, ed., Little, Brown, and Company, Boston (1859).
- René Cagnat et alii, L'Année épigraphique (The Year in Epigraphy, abbreviated AE), Presses Universitaires de France (1888–present).
- George Davis Chase, "The Origin of Roman Praenomina", in Harvard Studies in Classical Philology, vol. VIII (1897).
- Harper's Dictionary of Classical Literature and Antiquities, Harry Thurston Peck, ed. (Second Edition, 1897).
- Paul von Rohden, Elimar Klebs, & Hermann Dessau, Prosopographia Imperii Romani (The Prosopography of the Roman Empire, abbreviated PIR), Berlin (1898).
- MEFRA (in French). Vol. 115 (second ed.). L'Ecole française de Rome. 2003. ISBN 9782728307067.
- Demougin, Ségolène (2003). "Un nouveau préfet de l'annone du Ier siècle". Mélanges de l'École française de Rome – via Persee.
- Koloski-Ostrow, Ann O; Lyons, Claire L (2003). Naked Truths: Women, Sexuality and Gender in Classical Art and Archaeology. Routledge. ISBN 9781134603862.
- Franklin, James L. (2001). Pompeis Difficile Est: Studies in the Political Life of Imperial Pompeii (illustrated, new ed.). University of Michigan Press. ISBN 9780472110568.
