= Ollia gens =

The gens Ollia was a minor plebeian family at Rome. Few members of this gens achieved any prominence, and the best-known may have been Titus Ollius, the father of the empress Poppaea Sabina. Other Ollii are known from inscriptions.

== Origin ==
The nomen Ollius is probably another orthography of Aulius, a patronymic surname derived from the common praenomen Aulus.

== Members ==
This list includes abbreviated praenomina. For an explanation of this practice, see filiation.

- Titus Ollius, a man of equestrian rank, was an intimate friend of Sejanus, and was put to death by Tiberius after his friend's downfall. He married Poppaea Sabina the Elder, and was the father of the future empress of that name.
- Ollia T. f. Sabina, better known under her later name Poppaea Sabina.
- Lucius Ollius, named in an inscription from Velitrae in Latium.
- Quintus Ollius Felix, named in an inscription from Nuceria in Campania.
- Ollius Nicadas, husband of Milonia Apollonia, named in an inscription from Rome.
- Ollia C. f. Pothina, buried at Salona in Dalmatia, aged seventeen.
- Gaius Ollius Pothinus, dedicated a monument to his daughter, Pothina, at Salona.
- Gaius Ollius Primigenius, a soldier in the fourth legion, buried in Rusicade, aged thirty-five, having served nineteen years.

== See also ==
- List of Roman gentes

== Bibliography ==
- Publius Cornelius Tacitus, Annales.
- Dictionary of Greek and Roman Biography and Mythology, William Smith, ed., Little, Brown and Company, Boston (1849).
- Theodor Mommsen et alii, Corpus Inscriptionum Latinarum (The Body of Latin Inscriptions, abbreviated CIL), Berlin-Brandenburgische Akademie der Wissenschaften (1853–present).
- Supplementa Italica (Supplement for Italy, abbreviated SupIt), Unione Accademica Nazionale.
- René Cagnat et alii, L'Année épigraphique (The Year in Epigraphy, abbreviated AE), Presses Universitaires de France (1888–present).
- George Davis Chase, "The Origin of Roman Praenomina", in Harvard Studies in Classical Philology, vol. VIII (1897).
