= Gaius Poppaeus Sabinus =

First century Roman senator, consul, and provincial governor

Gaius Poppaeus Sabinus was a Roman senator (died AD 35), who served as consul in AD 9 with Quintus Sulpicius Camerinus as his colleague. He enjoyed the friendship of the Emperors Augustus and Tiberius.

Sabinus was elected to the consulship, with Quintus Sulpicius Camerinus, in AD 9. They served until the Kalends of July, when they were succeeded by Sabinus' brother, Quintus Poppaeus Secundus, and Marcus Papius Mutilus, authors of the lex Papia Poppaea, a law intended to strengthen and encourage marriage.

From 15 until his death in 35, Sabinus served as Governor of the combined provinces of Moesia, Achaea, and Macedonia. During his tenure Sabinus oversaw the resolution of a boundary dispute between the communities of Kierion and Metropolis (mod. Palaiokastro Georgikon), both located in ancient Thessaly. Also during his tenure he ended a revolt in Thrace in 26. Consequently, he was awarded the ornamenta triumphalia.

Gaius Poppaeus Sabinus died in late December of 35. He is believed to have died of natural causes. He was the father of Poppaea Sabina the Elder and maternal grandfather of Poppaea Sabina the Younger, the second wife of the future emperor Nero.

== See also ==
- Poppaea gens

Political offices
Preceded by Lucius Apronius, and Aulus Vibius Habitus as Suffect consuls	Consul of the Roman Empire; AD 9 with Quintus Sulpicius Camerinus	Succeeded by Marcus Papius Mutilus, and Quintus Poppaeus Secundus as Suffect consuls
