= Quintus Poppaeus Secundus =

Quintus Poppaeus Q. f. Q. n. Secundus was consul suffectus in AD 9, and one of the authors of the lex Papia Poppaea.

== Background ==
Secundus was descended from a respectable, if undistinguished plebeian family. His father and grandfather were also named Quintus, and from their shared filiation we know that Secundus was the brother of Gaius Poppaeus Sabinus, consul ordinarius in the same year that Secundus was suffectus. It is unclear which was the elder; typically an elder son would be named after his father, but the cognomen Secundus suggests that he was the younger brother.

== Consulship ==
Secundus was appointed consul suffectus ex Kalendis Juliis (Note: From the Kalends of July, or July 1.) together with Marcus Papius Mutilus, succeeding Gaius Poppaeus Sabinus and Quintus Sulpicius Camerinus. They held the consulship for six months, departing at the end of the year. During their term of office, Papius and Poppaeus authored the law that bore their names.

The lex Papia Poppaea was intended to discourage adultery, prevent the intermarriage of members of the senatorial class with freedmen or the children of freedmen, and encouraged lawful marriage and procreation, by establishing a set of regulations and legal penalties for those who remained unmarried or failed to produce children without receiving some sort of legal dispensation. Cassius Dio notes with irony that both Papius and Poppaeus were unmarried and childless.

The law was part of a more extensive attempt by Augustus to promote public morality. Other such laws came to be known as leges Juliae after the emperor's nomen gentilicium. Both for this reason and because the original language of the lex Papia Poppaea has been lost, and its exact provisions confused with related enactments, the law is also referred to as the lex Julia et Papia Poppaea.

Tacitus relates that the law failed to achieve its aims, and some eight years after its passage, the emperor Tiberius established a commission to ameliorate its penalties, due to the number of persons subjected to prosecution, the number of informers whom the law encouraged, and the vast amount of property confiscated under its provisions.

== See also ==
- Poppaea gens

== Bibliography ==
- Publius Cornelius Tacitus, Annales.
- Lucius Cassius Dio Cocceianus (Cassius Dio), Roman History.
- Dictionary of Greek and Roman Biography and Mythology, William Smith, ed., Little, Brown and Company, Boston (1849).
- Theodor Mommsen et alii, Corpus Inscriptionum Latinarum (The Body of Latin Inscriptions, abbreviated CIL), Berlin-Brandenburgische Akademie der Wissenschaften (1853–present).
- Dictionary of Greek and Roman Antiquities, William Smith, ed., Little, Brown, and Company, Boston (1859).
- René Cagnat et alii, L'Année épigraphique (The Year in Epigraphy, abbreviated AE), Presses Universitaires de France (1888–present).
- Paul von Rohden, Elimar Klebs, & Hermann Dessau, Prosopographia Imperii Romani (The Prosopography of the Roman Empire, abbreviated PIR), Berlin (1898).

Political offices
Preceded by Gaius Poppaeus Sabinus, and Quintus Sulpicius Camerinus as Ordinary consuls	Suffect consul of the Roman Empire; AD 9 with Marcus Papius Mutilus	Succeeded by Publius Cornelius Dolabella, and Gaius Junius Silanus as Ordinary consuls
