= Publius Cornelius Dolabella (consul 10) =

Roman general and senator active during the reigns of Emperors Augustus and Tiberius

Consul of the Roman Empire
- In office January 10 AD – June 10 AD Serving with Gaius Junius Silanus
- Preceded by: Marcus Papius Mutilus with Quintus Poppaeus Secundus
- Succeeded by: Servius Cornelius Lentulus Maluginensis with Quintus Junius Blaesus

Personal details
- Born: Unknown
- Died: Unknown
- Spouse: Sulpicia Galbilla
- Children: Publius Cornelius Dolabella

Military service
- Allegiance: Roman Empire
- Commands: Governor of Dalmatia; Proconsular Governor of Africa
- Battles/wars: Defeat of Tacfarinas

Publius Cornelius Dolabella (fl. c.10–c.28 AD) was a Roman senator active during the Principate. He was consul in AD 10 with Gaius Junius Silanus as his colleague. Dolabella is known for having reconstructed the Arch of Dolabella (perhaps formerly the Porta Caelimontana) in Rome in AD 10, together with his co-consul Junius Silanus. Later, Nero used it for his aqueduct to the Caelian Hill.

In 24 he was appointed proconsul of the province of Africa (modern Tunisia), supposedly pacified after ten years of insurgency. This turned out to be far from the case and Dolabella was pressed hard. Despite only having half the number of soldiers of his predecessor Dolabella conceived an effective strategy. He eventually forced the insurgents to battle, slew their leader, Tacfarinas, and brought the conflict to a conclusion. He then initiated the conversion of the Tunisian grasslands to arable fields, which were to be the breadbasket of Rome for centuries to come.

== Family ==
Dolabella was a member of a patrician branch of the gens Cornelii. Tacitus provides us with the hint that he was the son of Quinctilia, a sister of the Roman politician and general Publius Quinctilius Varus, and a Publius Cornelius Dolabella; however, authorities differ over which Dolabella was his father. In his book The Augustan Aristocracy, Ronald Syme identifies the father with Publius Cornelius Dolabella, consul in 44 BC and son-in-law of Cicero. At the time, he was the only Cornelius Dolabella known to fit. However, since the publication of Syme's book, a new fragment of the Fasti Tauromenium has been recovered which attests to another one: Publius Cornelius Dolabella, suffect consul in 35 BC. Patrick Tansey provides several arguments that favour identifying the consul of 35 BC as the father of the consul of AD 10. Frank Burr Marsh believes that the consul of 44 BC was the grandfather of the consul of 10 AD.

Dolabella married Sulpicia Galbilla, and their son was Publius Cornelius Dolabella, consul in 55.

== Biography ==
Dolabella served as consul from January to June 10 AD with Gaius Junius Silanus. Around the time he held the consulate Cornelius Dolabella was co-opted into two Roman priesthoods: the septemviri epulones, one of the four most prestigious ancient Roman priesthoods, and the lesser order of the sodales Titensis.

When the emperor Augustus died in 14, Dolabella was governor of Dalmatia. Augustus' successor Tiberius, as came to be habitual, delayed the end of Dolabella's tenure to 19 or 20; the next governor of Dalmatia, Lucius Volusius Saturninus, found himself delayed in the office until after Tiberius died in the year 37.

Once back in Rome, Dolabella is recorded as twice making excessively sycophantic proposals that Tiberius rejected. The first was in the year 21, following Gaius Silius' suppression of a rebellion of Gaulish debtors led by Julius Florus and the Aeduan Julius Sacrovir. Dolabella proposed that Tiberius return from Campania and enter Rome with an ovation for the victory. Tiberius rejected the proposal with an angry letter, stating that he was not so destitute of renown as to covet the meaningless honour of a tour of the neighbourhood of Rome. The second was in the following year, when his colleague in the consulship, Junius Silanus, was condemned for majestas. Dolabella proposed an inquiry into the morals of provincial magistrates with Tiberius as the judge. Tiberius rejected this proposal because a crime should always precede any punishment.

=== Africa ===
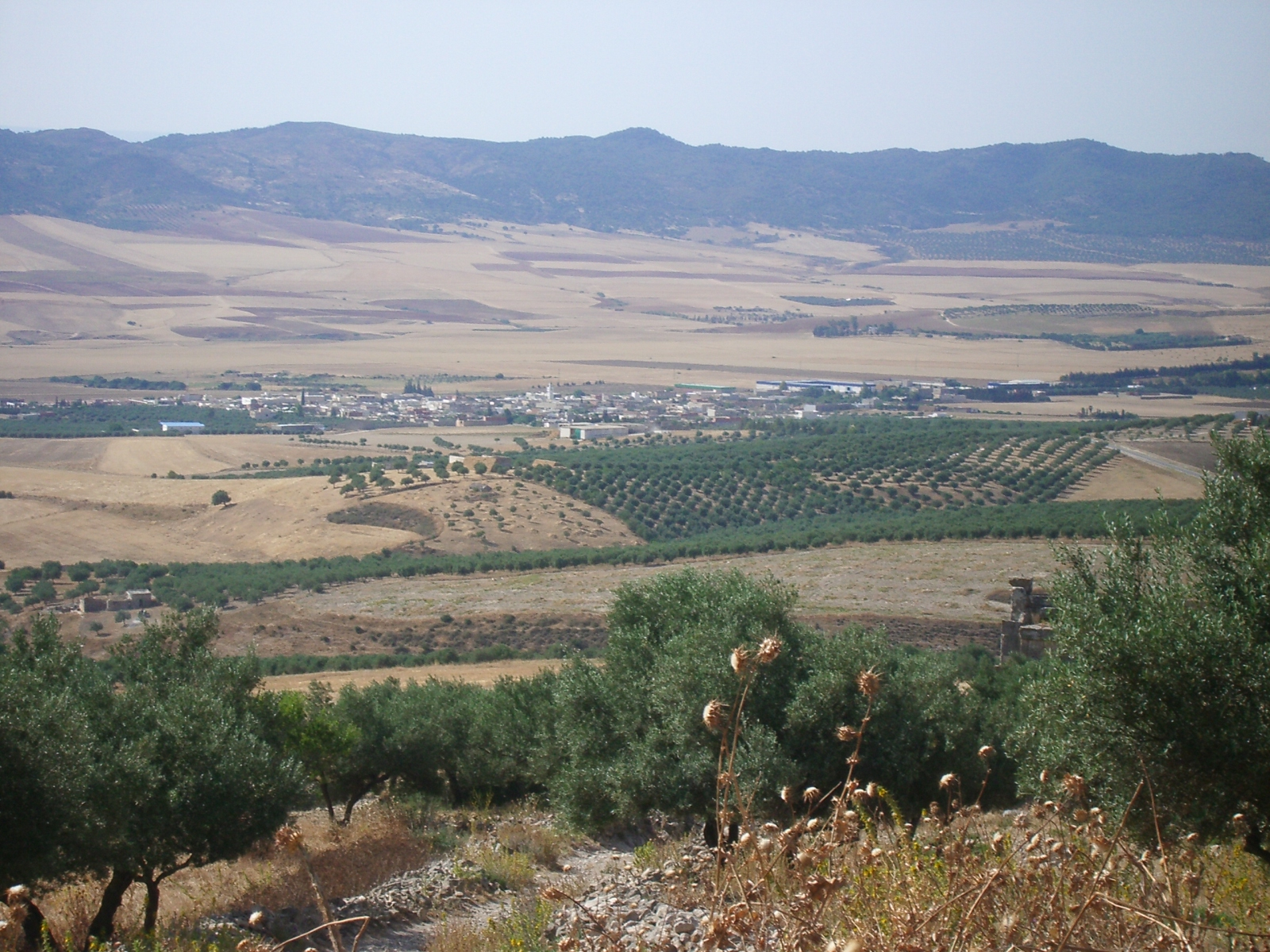
View of the central Tunisian plateau at Téboursouk, one possible location of the ancient Thubuscum, a Roman fort besieged by Tacfarinas in AD 24. This was prime wheat-growing country and supplied most of Rome's grain. It was the conflict between the demands of Roman agriculture and the traditional grazing rights of the Berber pastoralists that were the central cause of Tacfarinas' insurgency.

Dolabella was awarded the proconsular governorship of Africa for AD 23–24. The previous proconsul had been Blaesus, the uncle of Sejanus, Tiberius' commander of the Praetorian Guard and trusted right-hand man. His main concern had been combatting the 10-year uprising led by Tacfarinus, a Numidian Berber and deserter from the Roman army. After a war of attrition Blaesus' campaign achieved its crowning success in AD 22, when his men captured Tacfarinas' brother. Tiberius accepted this as marking the end of the war. He granted Blaesus the rare privilege of adopting the honorary title of imperator, "victorious general", the last time this was accorded to a person outside the imperial house, and the third awarded for defeating Tacfarinas. When Blaesus returned to Rome at the end of his term in 23, he was also accorded triumphal honours. The emperor ordered the withdrawal of Legio IX Hispana from Africa, confident that it was no longer needed. But Tacitus suggests that Blaesus and Tiberius were being over-optimistic about the situation, given that Tacfarinas himself was still at large with a substantial following.

The Romans were soon disabused of their complacency. Tacfarinas' great strength was that there was an inexhaustible supply of would-be raiders among the desert tribes. So even if he lost many of his followers in encounters with the Romans, which he frequently did, he could rapidly reconstitute his raiding-bands. Moreover, Tacfarinas started posing as the leader of a war of national liberation. He used the news of the withdrawal of half the Roman garrison to spread rumours that the empire was crumbling due to native revolts in its other regions, forcing the Romans to run down their forces in Africa. He claimed that the remaining garrison could be overcome, and Numidia permanently freed, by a concerted effort of all Numidians. His propaganda was highly effective and large numbers of Mauri warriors joined him, turning their backs on their young pro-Roman king, Ptolemy, who had recently succeeded his father, Juba II. In addition, many peasants, the poorest stratum of society, abandoned their fields and joined the insurgents. Tacfarinas also received "deniable" assistance from the king of the Garamantes, who, although officially allied with Rome, was making handsome profits as receiver of Tacfarinas' plunder and consequently made little effort to prevent substantial numbers of his warriors from joining the insurgents. Given the emergency, Dolabella would have been justified in requesting the postponement of the 9th Legion's imminent departure. However, he did not dare confront Tiberius with the grim reality of the situation in Africa.

By the start of the 24 campaign season, Tacfarinas felt strong enough to lay siege to the Roman strong-point of Thubuscum (Khamisa, Algeria or Teboursouk, Tunisia). Dolabella hurriedly assembled all his available troops and rushed to raise the siege. As usual, the Numidians proved unable to withstand the Roman infantry charge and were routed by the first assault; they fled westwards into Mauretania. Dolabella now embarked on an all-out effort to hunt down the ever-elusive Tacfarinas, as it was evident that, unless its leader was eliminated, the insurgency would never end. The proconsul summoned assistance from Ptolemy, in whose kingdom Tacfarinas had taken refuge, and who supplied large numbers of the Mauri horsemen who had remained loyal to him. Thus reinforced, Dolabella divided his force into four divisions advancing in parallel to cover as much territory as possible, with the allied cavalry acting as scouts, criss-crossing between the main columns.

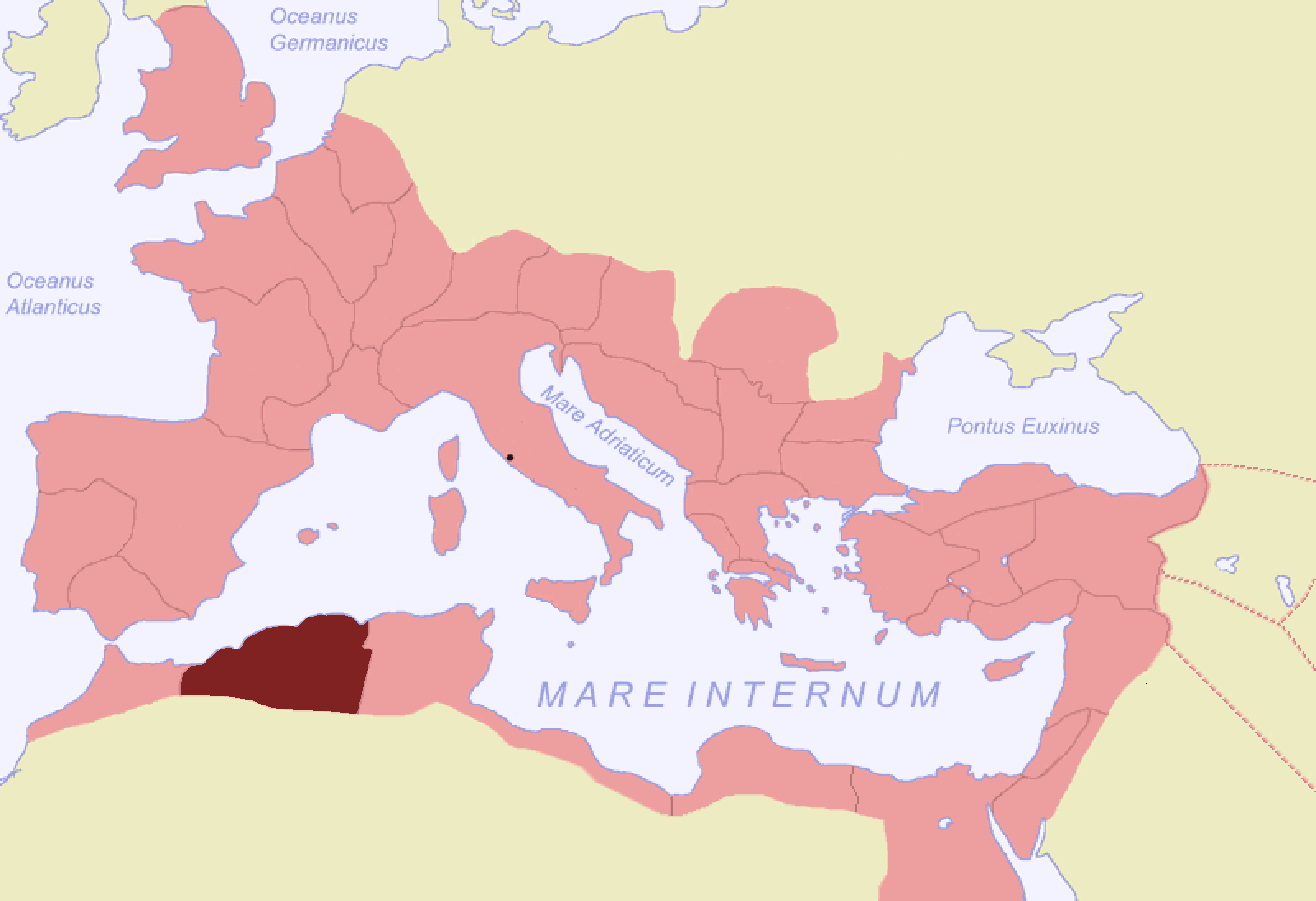
Roman province of Mauretania

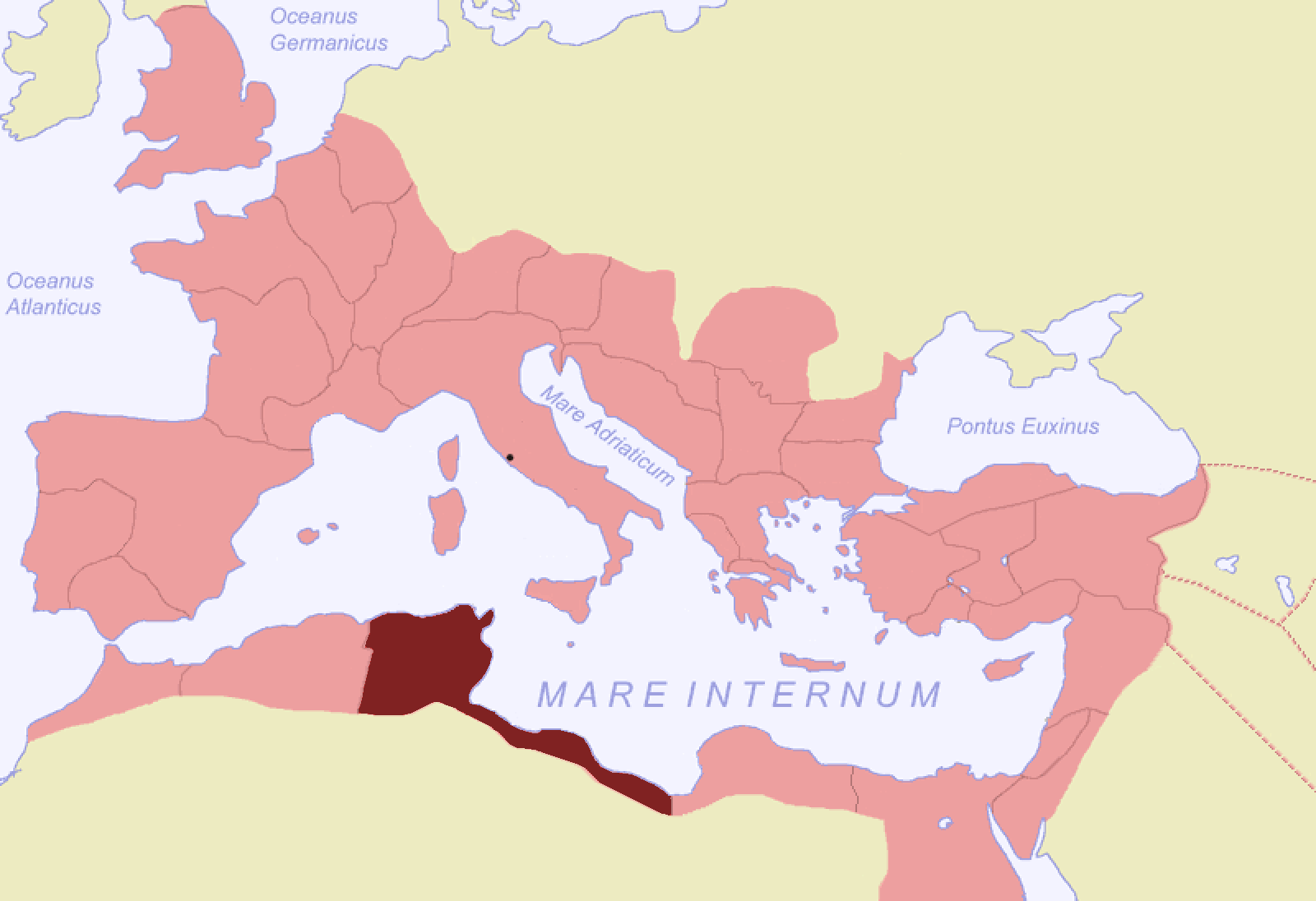
Roman province of Africa

The locations of Africa and Mauretania within the Roman Empire

These tactics soon paid off, as the crucial intelligence was obtained that Tacfarinas had established a camp near the half-ruined fort of Auzea (Sour el-Ghozlane, south-east of Algiers), which Tacfarinas' men had previously burnt down. Well to the west of the Roman province, the site was surrounded by extensive forests. Tacfarinas evidently discounted the possibility that the Romans could discover his location, as he apparently failed to post a screen of sentries in the woods. Dolabella immediately despatched a strike-force of lightly armed infantry and Numidian cavalry. They approached Tacfarinas' camp unobserved, under cover of the woods and the pre-dawn darkness. At dawn the Romans attacked the camp in full battle-order as the disorganised Numidians scrambled to pick up their weapons and to find their horses. The complete surprise resulted in a massacre, made all the bloodier by the Romans' lust for revenge after years of humiliation. Acting on strict orders the Roman centurions directed their men against Tacfarinas himself. The latter and his entourage were soon surrounded by overwhelming numbers and in a fierce fight his bodyguards were killed and his son taken prisoner. Recognising that there was no possibility of escape, Tacfarinas impaled himself on the massed spears of his assailants.

The death of Tacfarinas put an end to Musulamii hopes of halting the Roman takeover of their traditional grazing lands. Dolabella launched the registration of the whole plateau for tax purposes immediately after Tacfarinas' demise and completed it by 29 or 30, as evidenced by the stone markers laid down by the Roman surveyors, some of which survive to this day. The surveyors reach as far as the Chott el Jerid on the province's southern border. The region was largely turned to grain production and the Musulamii and other tribes permanently excluded from their former grazing areas.

Dolabella applied to the Senate for triumphal honours. His motion was voted down at the behest of Tiberius, despite the fact that arguably Dolabella deserved the accolade more than any of his three predecessors; unlike them, he had actually brought the war to an end by eliminating its instigator. Tacitus suggests that the reason was Sejanus' concern that his uncle's glory should not be diminished by comparison. Doubtless Tiberius' embarrassment that the war had flared up again after he had declared it won also played a part.

=== Later life ===
Tacitus mentions Dolabella twice more in the surviving portions of his Annales. In 28 Dolabella joined in the prosecution of his cousin Publius Quinctilius Varus. It is not known what Varus was charged with, but it may have been treason or maiestas. The outcome of the case is unknown, but the absence of his family from history makes it likely that Varus was either condemned or committed suicide. The date of Dollabella's death is not recorded.

Political offices
Preceded by Marcus Papius Mutilus, and Quintus Poppaeus Secundus as Suffect consuls	Consul of the Roman Empire; 10 with Gaius Junius Silanus	Succeeded by Servius Cornelius Lentulus Maluginensis, and Quintus Junius Blaesus as Suffect consuls
