= Gaius Junius Silanus =

Roman consul in 10 AD

Gaius Junius Silanus was a Roman senator active during the reigns of Augustus and Tiberius. He acceded to the rank of Roman consul in 10 AD as the colleague of Publius Cornelius Dolabella. For the term 20/21 the sortition selected him to be proconsul of Asia. However, upon his return to Rome in 22 he was accused of malversation (misconduct). To this alleged crime his accusers in the senate added the charges of treason (majestas) and sacrilege to the divinity of Augustus.

Tacitus suggests that the charge of treason was added to his charges in order to dissuade Silanus' friends from defending him. Silanus, deserted by his friends and without experience in pleading, abandoned his defence. It was proposed to outlaw and banish him to the island of Gyarus; but Tiberius changed the place of his exile to the less inhospitable island of Cythnus where his sister Torquata had begged might be his place of punishment.

He was either the father or a brother of Appius Junius Silanus, consul in 28; Decimus Junius Silanus, who had an affair with Julia the Younger; and Marcus Junius Silanus, consul suffectus in 15.

== Notes ==
Political offices
Preceded by Marcus Papius Mutilus, and Quintus Poppaeus Secundus as Suffect consuls	Consul of the Roman Empire; AD 10 with Publius Cornelius Dolabella	Succeeded by Servius Cornelius Lentulus Maluginensis, and Quintus Junius Blaesus as Suffect consuls
