= Lex Roscia =

The Lex Roscia was introduced in 49 BC by the praetor Lucius Roscius Fabatus on behalf of Julius Caesar. It granted Roman citizenship to the populations in Transpadana, the area of Cisalpine Gaul north of the River Po. In 89 BC, these peoples had already been granted Latin Rights with the Lex Pompeia de Transpadanis.

With this law Julius Caesar sought to secure the support of the population of Transpadana in the run up to Civil War against Pompey. One of Caesar's most loyal legions was the Legio X Equestris, which was largely recruited from among the population of Cisalpine Gaul. The area had been undergoing decades of Romanization since the subjugation of the Insubrians in 222 BC. A result of the Lex Roscia the Roman and Latin colonies (such as Mediolanum and Ticinum) became Roman municipia. This gave a significant impetus to the urbanization of this region.

== Sources ==
- Laffi, Umberto (2001). Studi di storia romana e di diritto (in Italian). Roma: Edizioni di Storia e Letteratura. pp. 245–61. ISBN 8887114706.
