= Junius Blaesus =

Roman commander and proconsul during the reigns of Augustus and Tiberius

Quintus Junius Blaesus (died AD 31) was a Roman politician who lived during the reigns of Augustus and Tiberius. He was the maternal uncle of Lucius Aelius Sejanus, the Praetorian Prefect of Emperor Tiberius.

== Career ==
Almost nothing is known of the career of Quintus Junius Blaesus prior to AD 10, when he served as suffect consul with Servius Cornelius Lentulus Maluginensis. The exception is a lead ingot attesting he was proconsul of Sicily; the date of his office can be dated no closer than the long reign of Augustus.

Blaesus subsequently appears as commander of the armies stationed in Pannonia when a mutiny broke out after the death of Augustus in the year 14. According to Tacitus, after military service in the Great Illyrian Revolt, soldiers were unhappy with their payment of swampy and mountainous Pannonian lands and demanded restitution. To ease tensions, Blaesus offered to commit suicide, but his request was ignored. According to the Roman historian Cassius Dio, the soldiers arrested and tortured his slaves, and then attempted to kill Blaesus. However, he managed to restore order temporarily by convincing them to send envoys to the Roman Senate. In response, Tiberius sent his son Drusus to put down the rebellion, accompanied by Sejanus and two Praetorian cohorts.

Blaesus' next post was that of proconsul of Africa from 21 to 23. He was helped to achieve this office due to his nephew, Sejanus, insofar as their relationship convinced the other possible choice, Marcus Aemilius Lepidus, to withdraw from contention.

During his time as proconsul in Africa, Blaesus was successful in defeating a revolt by the Roman-born Musulamii warlord Tacfarinas, a victory for which he earned triumphal honors and the title of imperator.

Blaesus' career came to an end in the year 31, when his nephew Sejanus was accused of treason and executed by order of Tiberius. Blaesus was put on trial as one of his associates. Instead of awaiting execution, he chose to commit suicide.

== Marriage and family ==
The identity of the wife of Quintus Junius Blaesus is not known, nor is the date of their marriage. However, Blaesus is known to have had at least two children, both sons, each of whom became consul in his own right: Quintus Junius Blaesus (suffect consul 26) and Lucius Junius Blaesus (suffect consul 28).

These sons both committed suicide in 36, when Tiberius transferred to others the priesthoods that had previously been promised to the Blaesi during their family's ascendance.

The last known descendant of this Quintus Junius Blaesus was a grandson (or great-grandson), Junius Blaesus the governor of Gallia Lugdunensis, who was murdered in the year 69 by Emperor Vitellius.

== See also ==
- Junia gens

== Footnotes ==
Political offices
Preceded by Publius Cornelius Dolabella, and Gaius Junius Silanus as ordinary consuls	Suffect consul of the Roman Empire; 10 with Servius Cornelius Lentulus Maluginensis	Succeeded by Manius Aemilius Lepidus, and Titus Statilius Taurus as ordinary consuls
Preceded by Lucius Apronius	Proconsul of Africa; 21 – 23	Succeeded by Publius Cornelius Dolabella
