= Quintus Sulpicius Camerinus =

Roman senator and poet who served as consul in AD 9

Quintus Sulpicius Camerinus was a Roman senator and poet, who served as consul in AD 9 as the colleague of Gaius Poppaeus Sabinus. He is particularly remembered for his poem about the capture of Troy by Hercules. Ovid wrote about him in Ponto memoravit. He is a member of the gens Sulpicia.

Political offices
Preceded by Lucius Apronius, and Aulus Vibius Habitus as Suffect consuls	Consul of the Roman Empire; AD 9 with Gaius Poppaeus Sabinus	Succeeded by Marcus Papius Mutilus, and Quintus Poppaeus Secundus as Suffect consuls
