= Poppaea Sabina =

Roman empress from 62 to 65 AD

- Augusta
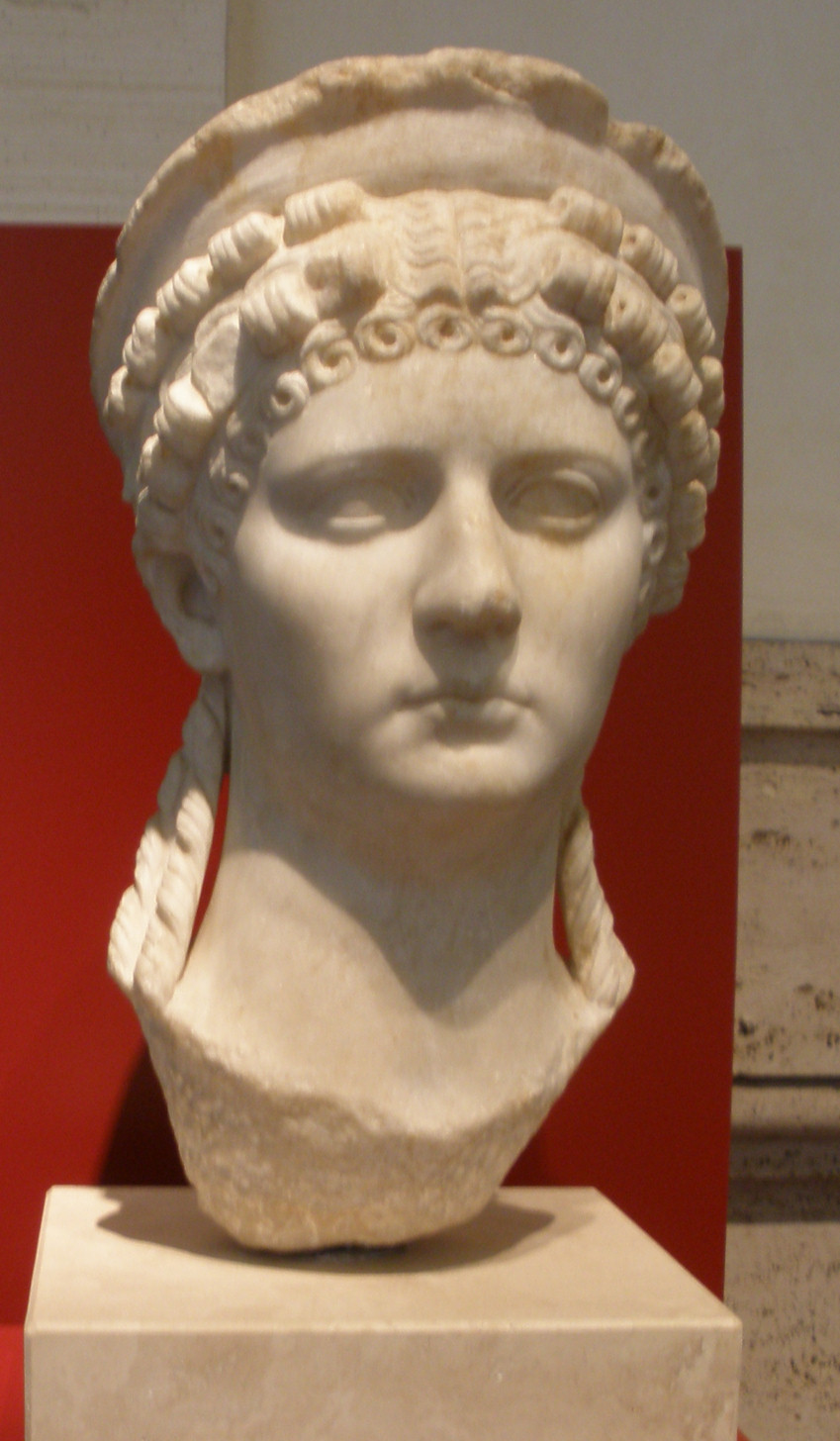
- Bust of Poppaea Sabina at Palazzo Massimo alle Terme

Roman empress
- Tenure: 62 AD – 65 AD
- Born: 30 AD; Pompeii, Italy
- Died: 65 AD (aged 34–35); Rome, Italy
- Burial: Tomb of the Julii, Rome
- Spouses: Rufrius Crispinus; Otho; Nero
- Issue: Rufrius Crispinus; Claudia Augusta
- Dynasty: Julio-Claudian (by marriage)
- Father: Titus Ollius
- Mother: Poppaea Sabina the Elder

Poppaea Sabina (30 AD – 65 AD), also known as Ollia, was a Roman empress as the second wife of the emperor Nero. She had also been wife to the future emperor Otho. The historians of antiquity describe her as a beautiful woman who used intrigues to become empress.

The large Villa Poppaea at Oplontis near Pompeii bears her name because of archaeological finds there, but it is unlikely she resided in or owned the villa. It has been largely excavated and can be visited today.

== Early life ==
=== Birth ===
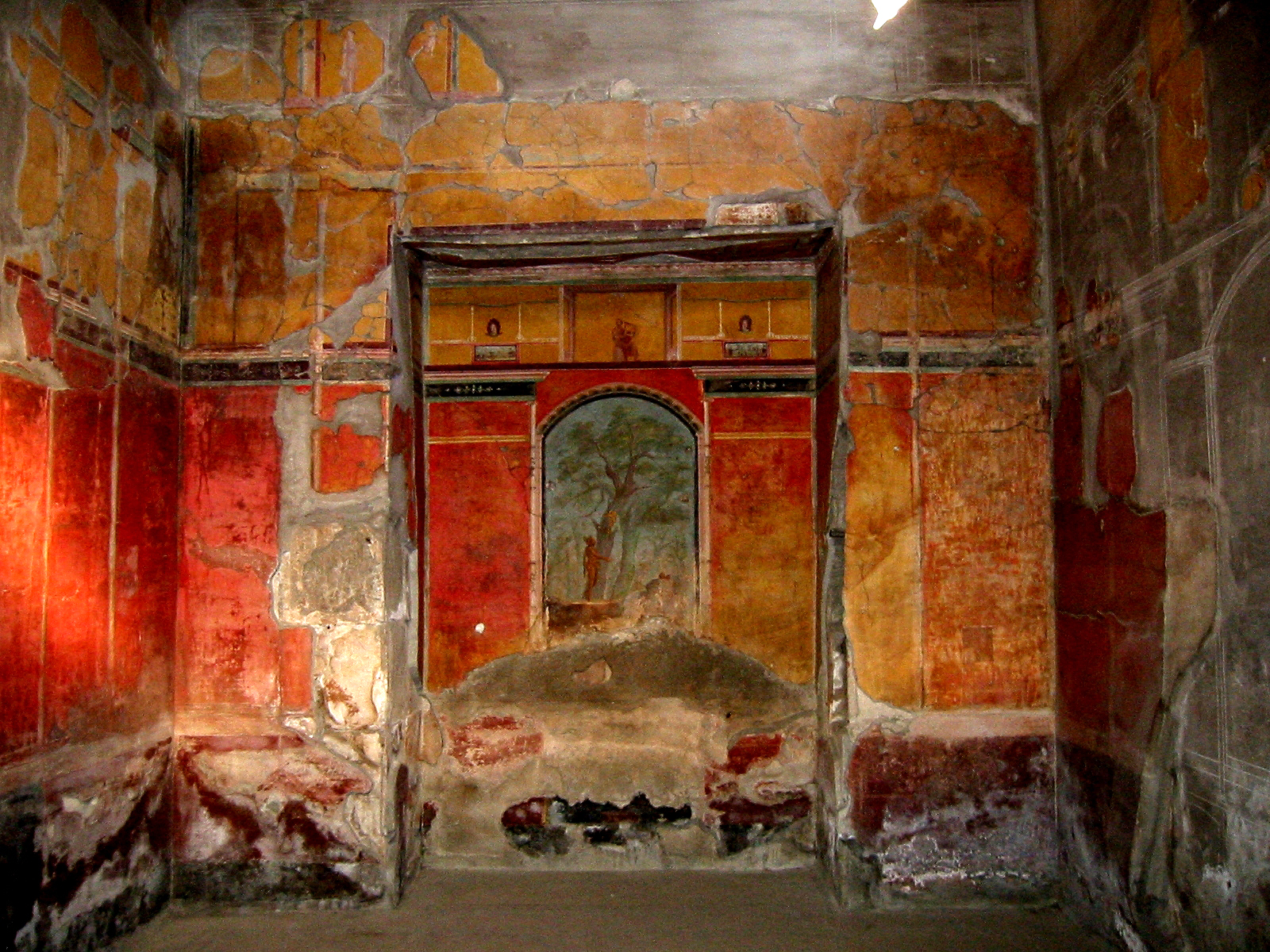
Villa Poppaea: caldarium of the private baths.

Poppaea Sabina the Younger was born in Pompeii in AD 30 as the daughter of Titus Ollius and Poppaea Sabina the Elder. At birth and for most of her childhood she went by her proper patronymic nomen "Ollia", belonging to women of her father's gens, the Ollii, but at some point, probably before her first marriage, decided to start going by her mother's name instead, potentially due to her father's disgrace and suicide.

It is very likely that Poppaea's family came from Pompeii, and the common belief is that they might have been the owners of the Casa del Menandro (a house in Pompeii named for the painting of the 4th century BC playwright Menander that is found there). Most evidence suggesting Poppaea's Pompeiian origins comes from the 20th-century excavations of a town that was destroyed in the eruption of Mount Vesuvius in 79. For instance, legal documents found during excavations in nearby Herculaneum described her as being the owner of a pottery workshop in the suburbs of Pompeii. The sumptuous Villa Poppaea, at Oplontis near Herculaneum, was thought to have been her main residence outside Rome, although some modern scholarship has cast doubt on this, concluding it is unlikely she owned or resided at the villa.

=== Family ===
Poppaea's father Titus Ollius was from Picenum (modern Marche and Abruzzo, Italy). He had a minor career in imperial politics during the reign of Emperor Tiberius, attaining the rank of quaestor and cultivating a friendship with the infamous praetorian prefect Lucius Aelius Sejanus. Ruined by the downfall of Sejanus, Ollius killed himself in 31 AD.

Poppaea Sabina the Elder, Poppaea's mother, was a distinguished woman, described by Tacitus as wealthy and "the loveliest woman of her day". After the death of Ollius she married Publius Cornelius Lentulus Scipio the Elder; the remarriage gave Poppaea the Younger a stepbrother, Publius Cornelius Lentulus Scipio the Younger, and a half-brother, Publius Cornelius Scipio Asiaticus. In 47 AD Poppaea the Elder was caught up in Roman Empress Valeria Messalina's political campaign against Decimus Valerius Asiaticus. Baselessly accused of adultery with Asiaticus, she likewise died by suicide.

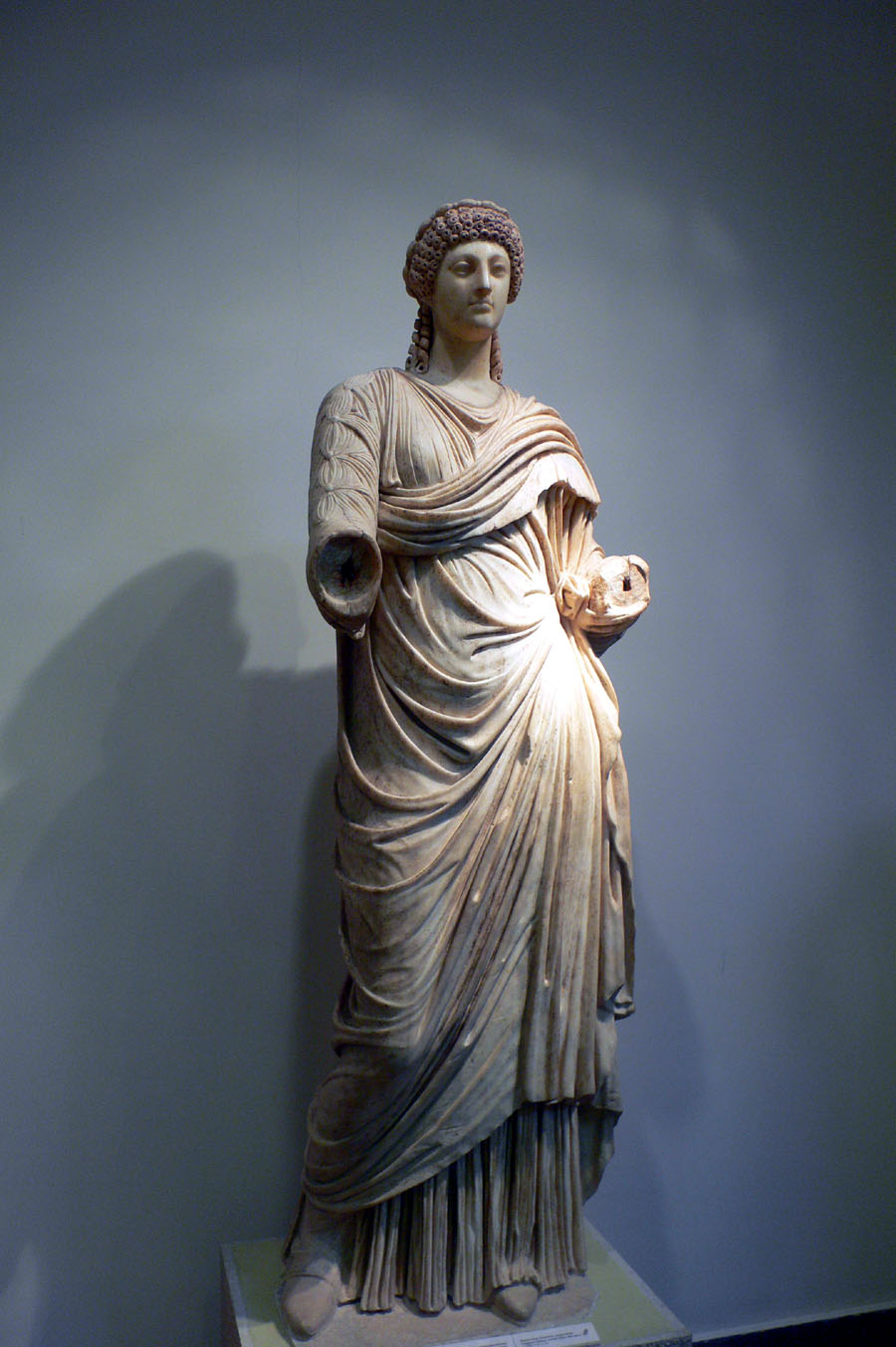
Statue of Poppaea in the Archaeological Museum of Olympia (Greece)

The father of Poppaea Sabina the Elder was Gaius Poppaeus Sabinus. This man of humble birth was consul in 9 AD and was the governor of Moesia from 12 to 35 AD. Passed during his consulship was the Lex Papia Poppaea, a law meant to strengthen and encourage marriage. Sabinus received a military triumph for ending a revolt in Thrace in 26 AD. From 15 AD until his death, he served as imperial Proconsul (or governor) of Greece and in other provinces. This competent administrator enjoyed the friendship of the Emperors Augustus and Tiberius. He died in late December of AD 35 from natural causes. After his death, Poppaea Sabina the Younger assumed the name of her maternal grandfather.

== First marriage to Rufrius Crispinus ==
Poppaea's first marriage was to Rufrius Crispinus, a man of equestrian rank. They married in 44 AD, when Poppaea was 14 years old. He was the leader of the Praetorian Guard during the first 10 years of the reign of the Emperor Claudius until 51 AD, when Claudius' new wife, Agrippina the Younger, removed him from this position. Agrippina regarded him as loyal to the deceased Messalina's memory and replaced him with Sextus Afranius Burrus. Later, under Nero, he was executed. During their marriage, Poppaea gave birth to their son, a younger Rufrius Crispinus, who, after her death, would be drowned by Nero while on a fishing trip.

== Second marriage to Otho ==
Poppaea then married Otho, a good friend of the new emperor Nero. According to Tacitus, Poppaea married Otho (who was seven years younger than she was) only to get close to Nero. Other ancient historians make Otho the catalyst of Nero and Poppaea's relationship, but disagree on the nature of his participation: "[D]id Otho marry her in order to make her available to Nero, or did he, like Candaules in Herodotus, boast of his wife's beauty once too often?" Regardless, Nero fell in love with Poppaea, and she became his mistress.

Poppaea later divorced Otho and focused her attentions solely on becoming Nero's new wife. Otho was ordered away to be governor of Lusitania. (A decade later, after Nero's death, Otho became emperor, in succession to Galba.) Sources differ on when Poppaea divorced Otho: Tacitus dates the divorce to 58 AD, Suetonius dates it to after 59 AD.

== Marriage to Nero and Empress of Rome ==
Tacitus depicts Poppaea as inducing Nero to murder his mother Agrippina in 59 AD so that she could marry him. Modern scholars, however, question the reliability of this story as Nero did not marry Poppaea until 62 AD and point to Suetonius's dating of her divorce from Otho. Some modern historians theorize that Nero's decision to kill Agrippina was prompted by her plot to set Gaius Rubellius Plautus (Nero's maternal second cousin) on the throne, rather than by Poppaea's scheming.

With Agrippina gone, Poppaea pressured Nero to divorce and later execute his first wife and stepsister, Claudia Octavia, in order to marry her. During his eight-year marriage to Octavia Nero fathered no children, but in 62 AD Poppaea became pregnant. When this happened, Nero claimed Octavia was barren, divorced her, and married Poppaea twelve days later. Octavia was initially exiled to Campania, then imprisoned on the island of Pandateria — a common sentence for members of the imperial family who fell from favor because of a charge of adultery. Poppaea's child, Claudia, was born on 21 January 63, and Nero marked the occasion by granting both mother and daughter the title of Augusta. Claudia died in May of the same year.

Tacitus and Suetonius portray Poppaea as an ambitious and ruthless schemer. Michael Grant is cautious about accepting this assessment, especially since Tacitus's account of Poppaea's character contains "suspiciously strong verbal and stylistic echoes" of Sallust's description of Sempronia, a participant in the Catilinarian conspiracy, and hence may be literary emulation instead of accurate reportage. Grant goes on to say that, apart from descriptions of her plotting, the ancient historians give few details about Poppaea; it can be gleaned that she was slightly older than Nero, had amber-colored hair which Nero praised in a poem, was supposed to have invented a popular face cream, consulted astrologers, and provided patronage to Jews. The Jewish historian Josephus calls Poppaea a worshipper of the God of Israel and writes that she urged Nero to show compassion to the Jewish people. In one account, Josephus shows how Poppaea advocated for the Jewish priests when an issue was brought before Nero by Herod Agrippa II, who was the Tetrarch of Jerusalem, concerning a wall that was built blocking Agrippa's view of the temple. She convinced Nero to not order the Jewish priests to tear down the wall and to leave the temple as is. However, in 64, Poppaea secured the position of procurator of Judaea for Gessius Florus, her friend's husband, who was harmful to the Jews.

== Death ==
The cause and timing of Poppaea's death is uncertain. According to Suetonius, while she was awaiting the birth of her third child in the summer of 65 AD, she quarrelled fiercely with Nero over his spending too much time at the races. In a fit of rage, Nero kicked her in the abdomen, causing her death. Tacitus, on the other hand, places her death after the Quinquennial Neronia (in 65 AD) and claims Nero's kick was a "casual outburst." Tacitus also mentions that some writers claimed Nero poisoned her, though Tacitus does not believe them. Cassius Dio claims Nero leapt upon her belly, but admitted that he did not know if it was intentional or accidental.

Modern historians, though, keep in mind Suetonius's, Tacitus's, and Cassius Dio's severe biases against Nero, and hence recognize that Poppaea may have died due to complications of miscarriage or childbirth. Furthermore, a Greek poem encrypted on a frayed piece of papyrus reads that a deified Poppaea "made a loving farewell speech to Nero, before [ascending] off to heaven on a chariot driven by a goddess", indicating her death was not caused by an act of violence of Nero's.

When Poppaea died in 65 AD, Nero went into deep mourning. Per the Roman imperial tradition, Poppaea was given a state funeral. In a departure from this cultural norm, however, she was not only embalmed, but also given divine honours alongside her daughter Claudia Augusta. Tacitus writes that Poppaea was embalmed by having her body filled with various herbs and spices and was buried in the Tomb of the Julii, but her actual burial spot is unknown. Nero supposedly burned a year's worth of Arabia's incense production at her funeral.

At the beginning of 66 AD, Nero married Statilia Messalina. After that, in 67 AD, Nero castrated and married a young freedman named Sporus. According to Cassius Dio, Sporus bore an uncanny resemblance to Poppaea, and Nero even called him by his dead wife's name.

== Cultural references ==
=== In opera ===
Fifteen centuries after her death, Poppaea was depicted in Claudio Monteverdi's last opera, L'incoronazione di Poppea (The coronation of Poppaea) in 1642. Her story clearly was chosen to appeal to the titillation favoured in the nascent culture of the Venetian public opera theaters, and its prologue immediately explains that it is not a drama that promotes the triumph of virtue. Poppaea is portrayed as cynically plotting to become empress of Rome by manipulating the emperor Nero into marrying her. Her machinations include the execution of Seneca the Younger, who opposes her plans.

Poppaea is a principal character also in Handel's 1709 opera Agrippina, but as a victim, not a perpetrator, of deceit and manipulation. Here the schemer is Agrippina, Nero's mother, intent on promoting her son's claim to the throne. Poppaea, the ingenue, is portrayed as the object of desire of Claudius, Nero, and Otho, each of whom served for a time as Roman Emperor, whose rivalries Agrippina attempts to leverage to her advantage. Once Poppaea sees through Agrippina's deceit, she responds in kind, but only in order to be united with Otho, portrayed as her one true love.

=== In film and television ===
Poppaea appears as a character in the several cinema and TV versions of Henryk Sienkiewicz's novel Quo Vadis:

- In the 1951 film version — in which she is played by Patricia Laffan in a widely praised performance — she is strangled to death by Nero, who blames her for turning his "loyal subjects", the Roman populace, against him. (This form of murder may have been suggested to the screenwriters by Suetonius' claim that Nero made several attempts to strangle his first wife, Octavia.)
- In the 1985 Italian TV miniseries Quo Vadis?, Poppaea was portrayed by Cristina Raines.
- In the 2001 film version, Poppaea was portrayed by Agnieszka Wagner.

In the 1932 pre-Code film The Sign of the Cross, Poppaea is portrayed (by Claudette Colbert) as openly bisexual, suggestively inviting a female companion to bathe with her, but lusting after Roman soldier Marcus Superbus (Fredric March). The historic story of Poppaea bathing in milk became through Colbert to be associated with Cleopatra, who Colbert did also portray in another film, becoming the modern myth about Cleopatra having bathed in milk.

Poppaea was portrayed by Brigitte Bardot in the 1956 Italian film Nero's Mistress; by Kay Patrick in the 1965 Doctor Who serial The Romans; by Sally Bazely in the 1976 BBC TV series I, Claudius; by Kara Tointon in the 2003 film Boudica (distributed in the U.S. as Warrior Queen); and by Élisa Tovati in the 2004 drama film Nero.

Rachel Yakar performs the role of Poppea in the 1979 opera film of L'incoronazione di Poppea, directed by Jean-Pierre Ponnelle and conducted by Nikolaus Harnoncourt.

Poppaea is portrayed by Catherine McCormack in the 2006 BBC docudrama Ancient Rome: The Rise and Fall of an Empire. In this interpretation, she is kicked to death by Nero after offhandedly and uncritically mentioning a minor glitch during his performance at the Quinquennial Neronia. Her corpse is later shown mounted on display.

In the 2013 Polish film Imperator, done entirely in Latin, Poppaea is played by Ewa Horwich. Here, Poppaea is depicted as outliving Nero and meeting her death in Germania after reuniting with Otho.

=== In music ===
The Gothic metal band Theatre of Tragedy wrote a song titled "Poppæa," inspired by her story, on their myth-based album Aégis.

== See also ==
- Poppaea gens

== Sources ==
=== Primary sources ===
- Publius Cornelius Tacitus, Annals XIII.45–46, XIV.63–64, XVI.6
- Suetonius, Lives of Caesars Life of Nero 35, Life of Otho 3
- Cassius Dio, Roman History LXII.11–13, LXII.27, LXIII.9, LXIII.11, LXIII.13

=== Secondary sources ===
- (in French) Minaud, Gérard, Les vies de 12 femmes d'empereur romain - Devoirs, Intrigues & Voluptés , Paris, L'Harmattan, 2012, ch. 4, La vie de Poppée, femme de Néron, p. 97-120.
- Donato, Giuseppe and Monique Seefried (1989). The Fragrant Past: Perfumes of Cleopatra and Julius Caesar. Emory University Museum of Art and Archaeology, Atlanta.
- Grant, Michael (1970). Nero: Emperor in Revolt. American Heritage Publishing Co, Ltd. ISBN 9780070240759.
- Griffin, Miriam T. (1985). Nero: The End of a Dynasty. Yale University Press. ISBN 0-300-03285-4.
