= Lex Plautia Papiria =

Ancient Roman law

The lex Plautia Papiria de civitate sociis danda was a Roman plebiscite enacted amidst the Social War in 89 BCE. It was proposed by the plebeian tribunes Marcus Plautius Silvanus and Gaius Papirius Carbo. The law further extended Roman citizenship to Italian communities – expanding the previous lex Julia de civitate – that had previously rebelled against Rome during this war.

== Background ==
The Social War, which was fought between 91 and 88 BCE, was a rebellion against Rome by some of her Italic socii (allies) caused by Rome's refusal to grant them Roman citizenship. However, this concession became necessary to try to stem the rebellion. The lex Plautia Papiria was not the first law that extended Roman citizenship during the Social War. In 90 BCE, the lex Calpurnia gave commanders the power to reward valor of soldiers with Roman citizenship. In the same year, the lex Julia de civitate granted civitas to Italian communities who had not participated in the rebellion against Rome to prevent them from joining the war. The law stated that communities with newly granted citizenship should be enrolled in new tribes for voting in the tribal assembly. In 89 BCE the lex Plautia Papiria followed the guidelines laid out in the lex Julia for adding new tribes for the new communities which were also granted citizenship. In the same year, the lex Pompeia de Transpadanis granted Latin rights to the communities in Transpadana, the region north of the River Po as a reward for having sided with Rome during the war.

== Provisions ==
While the complete original text of the law does not survive, Cicero stated several of the provisions of the law in his Pro Archia:

The freedom of the city was given him in accordance with the provisions of the law of Silvanus and Carbo: "If any men had been enrolled as citizens of the confederate cities, and if, at the time that the law was passed, they had a residence in Italy, and if within sixty days they had made a return or themselves to the praetor."

— Pro Archia, 4.7

Thus, an individual had to meet three conditions to become a Roman citizen under the newly created law: he must claim citizenship in an Italian city that was a Roman ally, he must have already established residence there before the passing of this law, and he must then present himself to a praetor within sixty days to be considered for citizenship. Unlike the lex Julia, which granted citizenship only to entire cities, the lex Papiria Plautia could be used to grant citizenship to individuals as well.

== Effects ==
Demonstrating its use in granting citizenship to an individual, the law was used as justification for bestowing citizenship upon Aulus Licinius Archias. Archias, a Greek poet, was accused of assuming his citizenship illegally. However, in Pro Archia, Cicero used, among other reasons, the lex Plautia Papiria to uphold the legitimacy of Archias' citizenship.

The law, however, was ineffective at persuading confederate towns and at ending the war. By placing the newly admitted citizens into new tribes instead of assimilating them into previously established tribes, the laws devalued their votes. Thus, Italian confederates had little incentive to stop fighting against Rome. Although it is also worth noting the significant benefits brought aside from suffrage (protection from mistreatment during military service, improved legal rights, and for the rich, chances to bid for lucrative tax farming contracts) which may for many have been most significant.

== See also ==
- Lex Julia
- List of Roman laws
