= Pro Archia Poeta =

Speech by Cicero

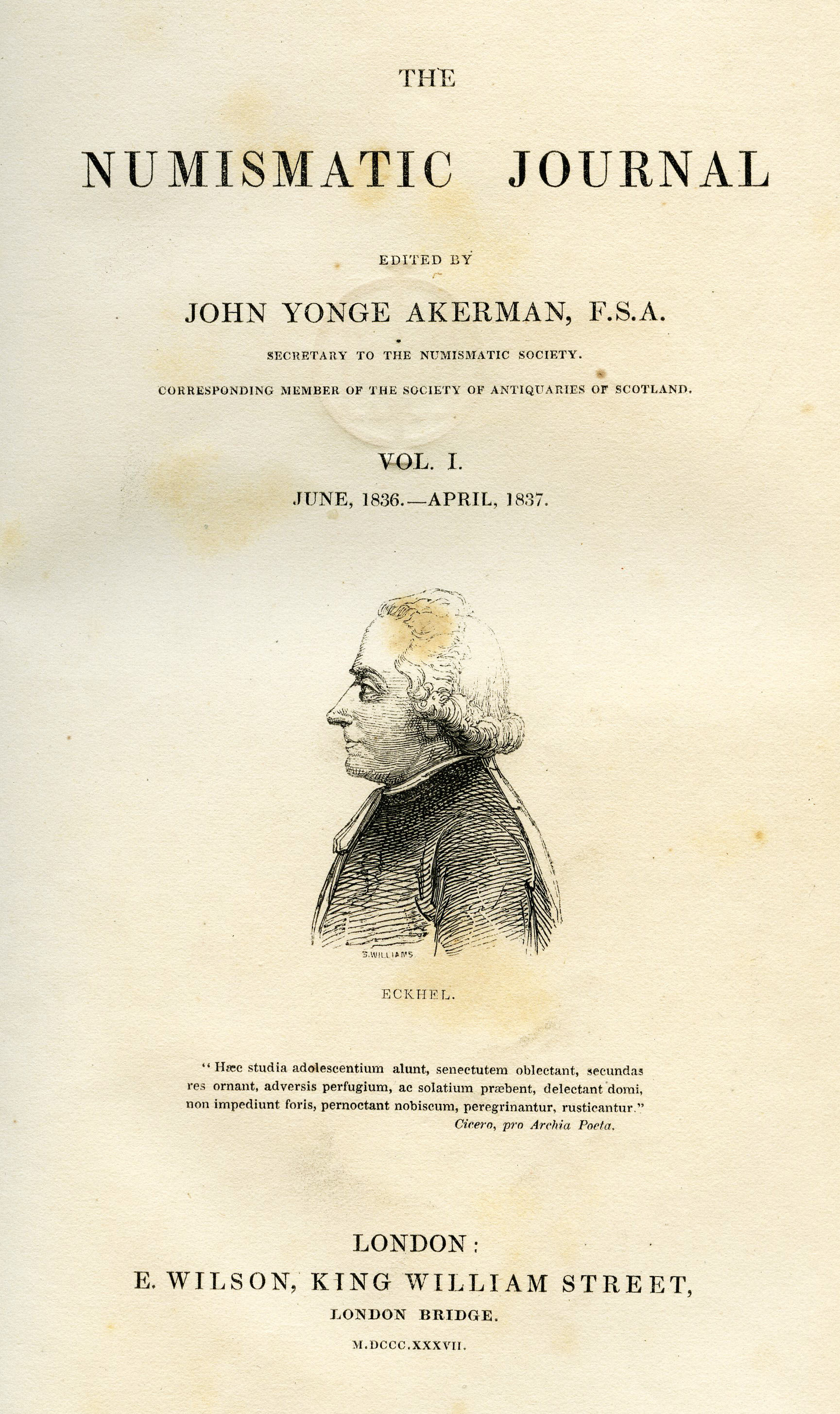
The Numismatic Journal (1837) with an engraving of Joseph Hilarius Eckhel and quotation from Pro Archia Poeta: "these studies are the food of youth, the delight of old age; the ornament of prosperity, the refuge and comfort of adversity; a delight at home, and no hindrance abroad; they are companions by night, and in travel, and in the country."

Cicero's oration Pro Archia Poeta ("On Behalf of Archias the Poet") is the published literary form of his defense of Aulus Licinius Archias, a poet accused of not being a Roman citizen. The accusation is believed to have been a political move against Lucullus through Archias. The poet was originally Greek but had been living in Rome for an extended period of time. A letter from Cicero to Titus Pomponius Atticus in the year following the trial makes mention of Archias, but there is no conclusive evidence about the outcome of the trial. The oration was rediscovered in Liège by Petrarch in 1333.

== Historical background ==
Licinius Archias was born in Antioch around 120 BC and arrived in Rome in 102 BC. It was here that he earned a living as a poet and gained the patronage of the Roman general and politician L. Lucullus. Archias wrote poems of the general's military exploits, and in 93 BC, Lucullus helped him gain citizenship of the municipium of Heraclea. Thereafter, Archias was set up with a permanent residence in Rome in preparation for achieving full Roman citizenship. It was in Rome where Archias became a mentor and teacher of Cicero in his early education in rhetoric.

Archias had become eligible for Roman citizenship under the Lex Iulia de Civitate Latinis Danda, passed in 90 BC, and the Lex Plautia Papiria de Civitate Sociis Danda, passed in 89 BC. The Lex Iulia granted Roman citizenship to all citizens of municipia on the Italic peninsula, provided they had not fought against Rome in the Social War.

== Basis of the prosecution and defense ==
In 65 BC, the Roman Senate passed the Lex Papia de Peregrinis, which challenged false claims of citizenship and expelled foreigners from Rome. It is most likely under this law that Archias was prosecuted. Cicero came to his former teacher's defense at his trial in 62 BC, only months after delivering the famous Catiline Orations.

The prosecution laid out four accusations in its case against Archias:

- There was no official enrollment record for Archias as a citizen of Heraclea
- Archias did not maintain a permanent residence in Rome
- The records of the praetors of 89 BC, which list Archias’ name, are unreliable
- Archias does not appear on the Roman census rolls taken during the period in which he claimed to have lived there.

Cicero argued in defense:

- There was no official enrollment record for Archias in Heraclea because the records office had notoriously been destroyed during the Social War, and representatives of Heraclea testified that Archias was in fact a citizen.
- He did have a residence in Rome.
- He also appeared in the records of the praetor Metellus, which were very reliable.
- Archias did not appear on the Roman census because he was away on campaign with Lucullus at each time they were taken.

Because of Archias' close association with Lucullus, the case was probably a political attack directed at the politician by one of his many enemies. Chief among his enemies, and one who would stand to gain much by disgracing Lucullus was Gnaeus Pompeius Magnus, better known as Pompey the Great.

== Structure of the speech ==
Cicero divided the speech by following the formal structure of the dispositio:

- Exordium, sections 1–4
- Narratio, sections 5-7
- Refutatio, sections 8-11
- Confirmatio, sections 12-30
- Peroratio, sections 31-32

=== Exordium or introduction ===
Cicero begins his speech by gaining the goodwill or benevolentia of the judges. He starts with his trademark periodic sentence by depicting his strengths of natural talent, experience, and strategy while appearing humble and inferior to the qualities of his client. He asks the court to indulge him with a novum genus dicendi "new manner of speaking", similar to the style of a poet. The greater part of the speech contains finely crafted rhetoric and an increased frequency of such poetical devices as hendiadys, chiasmus, and the golden line. His aim is to draw attention to Archias' profession and appeal to his value in Roman culture. He reveals this thesis in section 2:

Etenim omnes artes quae ad humanitatem pertinent habent quoddam commune vinculum et quasi cognatione quadam inter se continentur.

To be sure, all arts which are relevant to human culture have a certain common bond, and are connected, one to another, by a sort of, as it were, kindred relationship.

He continues with this approach in the final lines of this section where he proposes that even if Archias were not enrolled as a citizen, his virtuous qualities should compel us to enroll him.

=== Narratio or statement of the case ===
Cicero begins his account of Archias' life and travels through Asia and Greece during the poet's early career before his first arrival in Rome. He says that he was yet only sixteen or seventeen years old, wearing the striped toga or praetextatus, when he began his studies in the arts and gained the attention of some of Rome's most influential citizens. Cicero emphasizes the stature of those who is gave patronage to Archias by altering the usual word order.

Lucullos vero et Drusum et Octavios et Catonem et totam Hortensiorum domum devinctam consuetudine cum teneret, adficiebatur summo honore, quod eum non solum colebant qui aliquid percipere atque audire studebant, verum etiam si qui forte simulabant.
Lucullus, indeed, and Drusus and Octavius, and Cato and the whole house of Hortensii, since he held them bound by close social ties, he was treated by them with the highest of honors; for not only did everyone cultivate his friendship who devoted to hear and to take in anything they did, but even those who only pretended.

Instead of beginning with cum ("since") as what would be expected, Cicero suspends it to the end of the phrase to bring attention to the gravity of the names he states.

While naming the law under which Archias was granted citizenship at Heraclea, Cicero begins with the verb to emphasize that citizenship was indeed granted (Data est).

=== Refutatio or rebuttal of the opponent's case ===
In this section, Cicero discredits the four points raised against his client. He uses dramatic rhetoric to discredit the case of his opponent, Grattius, whom he here names. He starts with two chiastic structures identifying his witnesses, Lucius Lucullus and the embassy, and then ridicules the prosecution with a tricolon crescendo.

Est ridiculum ad ea quae habemus nihil dicere, quaerere quae habere non possumus; et de hominum memoria tacere, litterarum memoriam flagitare; et, cum habeas amplissimi viri religionem, integerrimi municipi ius iurandum fidemque, ea quae depravari nullo modo possunt repudiare, tabulas, quas idem dicis solere corrumpi, desiderare.
It is ridiculous! To say nothing in contradiction of those things which we do have, but to ask for proof of those things which we cannot have; to keep silent with regard to the memory of men, but to demand the memory of documents; and (although you have the revered testimony of a distinguished gentleman and the sworn oath and good faith of a respectable municipality) to reject those things which in no way may be tarnished, but to demand records which you say yourself are often corrupted.

=== Confirmatio or Cicero's own case ===
After the rebuttal Cicero presents his case for Archias’ citizenship. He starts the confirmatio by asking himself a question on behalf of Grattius.

Quaeres a nobis, Grati, cur tanto opere hoc homine delectemur. (Cic. Arch. 12)

You will ask me, Gratius, why I am so enthusiastic about this man.

In his argument, Cicero discusses the benefits of literature, the intrinsic dignity or virtue of poets and the relationship of the poet to the state. Cicero mentions three benefits of literature: literature provides refreshment for the spirit and repose for the senses; it provides Cicero with inspiration for his daily speeches and therefore strengthens his oratorical powers; and it contains moral lessons and provides examples to contemplate and to emulate.

Cicero states that poets have a natural gift and that Ennius called poets holy. Literature tells and celebrates achievements. It is for that reason that many noble Romans had a poet to write for them.

In the end of the confirmatio Cicero gives another reason for his passion for Archias:

Nam quas res nos in consulatu nostro vobiscum simul pro salute huius urbis atque imperii et pro vita civium proque universa re publica gessimus, attigit hic versibus atque inchoavit: quibus auditis, quod mihi magna res et iucunda visa est, hunc ad perficiendum adhortatus sum. (Cic. Arch. 28)

The measures which I, jointly with you, undertook in my consulship for the safety of the empire, the lives of our citizens, and the common weal of the state, have been taken by my client as the subject of a poem which he has begun; he read this to me, and the work struck me as at once so forcible and so interesting, that I encouraged him to complete it. (Watts translation)

Apparently Archias was writing a poem about Cicero's consulship, and Cicero was eager for him to complete it.

=== Peroratio or closing statement ===
Cicero makes a final emotional appeal to the jury. Just as in the exordium he makes clear that this was an unusual speech compared to the tradition of trials. He is however certain the judges have received it gladly:

... quae a foro aliena iudicialique consuetudine et de hominis ingenio et communiter de ipsius studio locutus sum, ea, iudices, a vobis spero esse in bonam partem accepta, ab eo, qui iudicium exercet, certo scio. (Cic. Arch. 32)

I hope that my departure from the practice and the conventions of the courts, and my digression upon the subject of my client’s genius, and, in general terms, upon the art which he follows, has been welcomed by you in as generous a spirit as I am assured it has been welcomed by him who presides over this tribunal.

== References and sources ==
Sources

- Reid, James S: M. Tulli Ciceronis pro A. Licinio Archia poeta ad iudices: edited for schools and colleges (Cambridge University Press, 1897)
- Clark, Albert Curtis: in Oxford Classical Texts, M. Tulli Ciceronis Orationes vol.VI (Oxford University Press, 1911)
- Dugan, J. (2001) ‘How to Make (and Break) a Cicero: Epideixis, Textuality, and Self-fashioning in the Pro Archia and In Pisonem’, Classical Antiquity, 20, 1, 35-77.
- Nesholm, E.J. (2010) ‘Language and Artistry in Cicero’s “Pro Archia”’, The Classical World, 103, 4, 477-490.
- Panoussi, V. (2009) ‘Roman Cultural Identity in Cicero’s Pro Archia’, in Karamalengou, E. and Makrygianni, E.D., eds., Antiphilesis: Studies on Classical, Byzantine and Modern Greek Literature and Culture in Honour of John Theophanes A. Papademetriou. Stuttgart. 516-523.
- Porter, W.M. (1990) ‘Cicero’s Pro Archia and the Responsibilities of Reading’, A Journal of the History of Rhetoric, 8, 2, 137-152.
