= Frisian revolt of 28 AD =

Roman-era battle in Frisia

- Part of the Roman–Germanic Wars
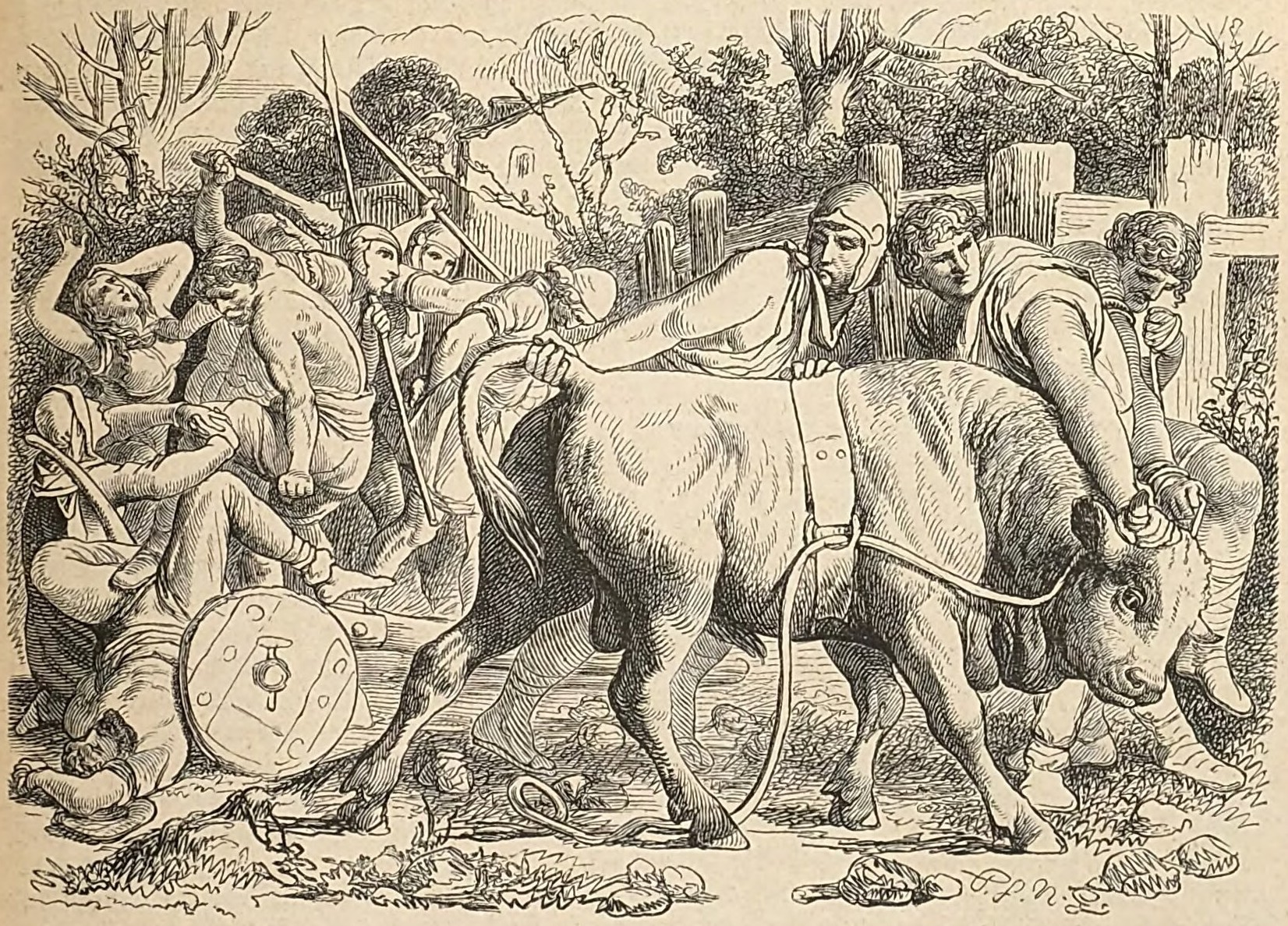
- An illustration by Peter Johann Nepomuk Geiger (1873) depicting the resulting conflict
Date	28 AD
Location	Presumed near Heiloo, Netherlands
Result	Frisian victory: Romans withdraw

Belligerents
Roman Empire	Frisii

Commanders and leaders
Lucius Apronius	Unknown

Strength
Unknown	Unknown

Casualties and losses
1,300+	Heavy

In 28 AD, the Frisii revolted against local Roman authorities over excessive taxation, culminating in a battle, possibly fought near Heiloo in the modern-day Netherlands, in the same year between the local Frisii and a Roman army led by the Roman general Lucius Apronius.

The earliest mention of the Frisii tells of Drusus's 12 BC war against the Rhine Germans and the Chauci. The Romans did not attack them after devastating the lands of the Rhine Germans, but merely passed through their territory and along their coast in order to attack the Chauci. The account says that the Frisii were subjugated, suggesting a Roman suzerainty was imposed. When Drusus brought Roman forces through Frisii lands in 12 BC and defeated them, he placed a moderate tax on them. However, a later Roman governor raised the requirements and exacted payment, at first decimating (removing one tenth of) the herds of the Frisii, then confiscating their land, and finally taking wives and children into bondage. By AD 28 the Frisii had had enough. They hanged the Roman soldiers collecting the tax and forced the governor to flee to a Roman fort, which they then besieged.

According to Tacitus:

As soon as this was known to the propraetor of Lower Germany, Lucius Apronius, he summoned from the Upper province the legionary veterans, as well as some picked auxiliary infantry and cavalry. Instantly conveying both armies down the Rhine, he threw them on the Frisii, raising at once the siege of the fortress and dispersing the rebels in defence of their own possessions. Next, he began constructing solid roads and bridges over the neighbouring estuaries for the passage of his heavy troops, and meanwhile having found a ford, he ordered the cavalry of the Canninefates, with all the German infantry which served with us, to take the enemy in the rear. Already in battle array, they were beating back our auxiliary horse as well as that of the legions sent to support them, when three light cohorts, then two more, and after a while the entire cavalry were sent to the attack. They were strong enough, had they charged altogether, but coming up, as they did, at intervals, they did not give fresh courage to the repulsed troops and were themselves carried away in the panic of the fugitives. Apronius entrusted the rest of the auxiliaries to Cethegus Labeo, the commander of the Fifth legion, but he too, finding his men's position critical and being in extreme peril, sent messages imploring the whole strength of the legions. The soldiers of the Fifth sprang forward, drove back the enemy in a fierce encounter, and saved our cohorts and cavalry, who were exhausted by their wounds. But the Roman general did not attempt vengeance or even bury the dead, although many tribunes, prefects, and first-rank centurions had fallen. Soon afterwards it was ascertained from deserters that nine hundred Romans had been cut to pieces in a wood called Baduhenna's, after prolonging the fight to the next day, and that another body of four hundred, which had taken possession of the house of one Cruptorix, once a soldier in our pay, fearing betrayal, had perished by mutual slaughter. Annales, Book iv.72

For some reason, the Romans did not continue with the military operations and the matter was closed. The prestige of the Frisii among the neighboring Germanic tribes was raised considerably.

== See also ==
- Baduhenna
- Old Frisian
- Third Servile War

== Sources ==
- Tacitus, Publius Cornelius (117), Church, Alfred John; Brodribb, William Jackson (eds.), Annals of Tacitus (translated into English), London: MacMillan and Co. (published 1895)
