= Servius Cornelius Lentulus Maluginensis =

Roman statesman, and consul in AD 10

Servius Cornelius Lentulus Maluginensis (died AD 23) was a Roman statesman, who flourished during the reigns of Augustus and Tiberius. He was flamen dialis, and consul suffectus in AD 10.

== Descent ==
Descended from the patrician Cornelia gens, Cornelius' father and grandfather were both named Gnaeus, and they belonged to the family of the Cornelii Lentuli, which first appears in Roman history during the fourth century BC. Their relationship to other prominent members of the family is not immediately apparent. It is possibly that Cornelius' father was a quaestor in 29 BC; he also might be the same person with Gnaeus Cornelius Lentulus Augur. The surname Maluginensis was borne by the most ancient branch of the Cornelii, but had long since vanished from use; in Imperial times old cognomina were frequently revived.

== Career ==
Cornelius' chief notability is for having been appointed flamen dialis, the high priest of Jupiter, at the direction of Augustus, after the position had been vacant for an unusually long period. The precise date of his appointment is uncertain; Cassius Dio places it about 11 BC, which is accepted by many modern scholars. But Tacitus states that he was appointed seventy-two years after the suicide of Lucius Cornelius Merula, the previous holder of the priesthood, in 87 BC. (Note: Some translators, including Rex Warner, but not Wood amend Tacitus to match the date given by Cassius Dio, although generally Tacitus is the more reliable historian. Gaius Stern suggests that Tacitus is probably correct, meaning that Cornelius became flamen dialis while Marcus Aemilius Lepidus, who died in 13 or 12 BC, was the pontifex maximus. Lepidus would have to have supervised Cornelius' inauguration, perhaps unwillingly.)

In AD 10, Cornelius and Quintus Junius Blaesus, were appointed consul suffectus in the place of Publius Cornelius Dolabella and Gaius Junius Silanus. Cornelius and Blaesus served from the kalends of July to the end of the year. Twelve years later, Cornelius sought to be appointed governor of Asia for AD 22. Such an appointment would have been typical for a consular such as Cornelius. However, the emperor Tiberius asserted that the religious duties and obligations of the flamen dialis precluded his leaving Italy, and thus Cornelius was denied the governorship. He died in AD 23, and his son, also named Servius, was appointed flamen dialis in his place.

== See also ==
- Cornelia (gens)

== Bibliography ==
- Publius Cornelius Tacitus, Annales.
- Cassius Dio, Roman History.
- Dictionary of Greek and Roman Biography and Mythology, William Smith, ed., Little, Brown and Company, Boston (1849).

Political offices
Preceded by Publius Cornelius Dolabella; Gaius Junius Silanus as ordinary consuls	Roman consul 10 (suffect) with Quintus Junius Blaesus	Succeeded by Manius Aemilius Lepidus; Titus Statilius Taurus as ordinary consuls
