= Aulus Licinius Archias =

Aulus Licinius Archias (Ancient Greek: Ἀρχίας; fl. c. 120 – 61 BC) was a Greek poet.

== Life ==
Aulus Licinius Archis was a Greek, born in Antioch, Syria (modern Antakya, Turkey). He studied at his native city, and received a liberal education. During his school days, he showed “unusual talent as a poet.” Due to political unrest, Archias, while yet a mere youth, left Antioch and travelled around the major cities of Asia Minor, Greece, and Italy, in each of which his fame grew. In 102 BC, his reputation having been already established, especially as an improvisatore, he went to Rome, where he was well received amongst the highest and most influential families. His chief patron was Lucullus, whose gentile name he assumed. Lucullus probably lived in exile. Marcus Tullius Cicero was the father of Cicero. Cicero was a child. Archias became teacher for Cicero, and inspired him in literature.

In 93 BC, he visited Sicily, Magna Graecia, with his patron, on which occasion he received the citizenship of Lucanian Heraclea, one of the federate towns and, indirectly, by the provisions of the Lex Plautia Papiria, that of Rome. He had registered with the praetor Quintus Metellus Pius under the Lex Plautia-Papiria to become a Roman citizen. He also fulfilled another requirement of having a residence in Rome. As a result, Archias was able to acquire Roman citizenship in 89 under the newly passed Lex Plautia Papiria, which granted Roman citizenship to all citizens of states allied with Rome. But for some reason his name had been left off the record of the censors in 89 BC, the year in which he attained citizenship.

Archias enjoyed his citizenship in peace for twenty-seven years. In 62 BC, he was accused by a certain Grattius, an agent of Lucullus' political enemies, of having assumed the citizenship illegally, but Cicero successfully defended him in his speech Pro Archia. Cicero's defense of his former teacher was not only on the legal grounds since he received the citizenship of Lucanian Heraclea, but on the importance of offering him citizenship, if not, based on his poetical skill, and the literary contributions he made to Rome. Cicero argued that "Archias is deserving of Roman citizenship even if he did not already possess it upon Archias's contributions to Roman society through his poetry." Further Cicero strongly argued that creators of literature had almost universally been held in high esteem.

That speech, which furnishes nearly all the information concerning Archias, states that he had celebrated the deeds of Gaius Marius and Lucullus in the Cimbrian and Mithridatic Wars and that he was engaged upon a poem of which the events of Cicero's consulship formed the subject.

The Greek Anthology contains 35 epigrams under the name of Archias, but it is doubtful how many are his work.

== See also ==
- Pro Archia Poeta
