= Lex Pompeia de Transpadanis =

Ancient Roman law

The Lex Pompeia de Transpadanis was a Roman law promulgated by the Roman Consul Pompeius Strabo in 89 BC. It was one of three laws introduced by the Romans during the Social War (91–88 BC) between Rome and her Socii (allies), where some of Rome's Italic allies rebelled and waged war against her because of her refusal to grant them Roman citizenship. This law dealt with the local communities in Transpadana, the region north of the River Po, (and possibly some Ligurian communities south of this river, along its western course). It granted Latin Rights (ius Latii) to these peoples as a reward for siding with the Rome during the Social War. This gave the inhabitants of the region the legal benefits associated with these rights, which were previously restricted to the towns of Latium (land of the Latins) which had not been incorporated into the Roman Republic and to the citizens of Latin colonies. They included: A) Ius Commercii (right to trade), "a privilege granted to Latin colonies to have contractual relations, to trade with Roman citizens on equal terms and to use the form of contracts available to Roman citizens". It also allowed contracts and trade on equal terms with citizens of another Latin towns. B) Ius Connubii (right to marry), was the right to conclude a marriage recognised by law, ius connubii of both parties was necessary for the validity of the marriage. Later it was extended to citizens of foreign communities "either generally, or by special concession". In the case of Latin rights it made marriages between citizens of different Latin towns legal. C) Ius migrationis (right to migrate), the right to retain one's level of citizenship if the individual relocated to another city. In other words, it facilitated migration by the acquisition of citizenship of another Latin town. In addition to this, the law granted Roman citizenship to the magistrates (officials) of the local towns.

This measure was preceded by the Lex Iulia de Civitate Latinis et Socii Danda of 90 BC which granted Roman citizenship to all the citizens of Italic towns which had not rebelled against Rome, and the Lex Plautia Papiria de Civitate Sociis Danda which granted Roman citizenship to Italian communities which had rebelled against Rome during this war.

== See also ==
- Social War (91–88 BC)
- Lex Julia
- Lex Plautia Papiria
- Roman citizenship
- Roman law
- List of Roman laws
