= Claudia Augusta =

Baby daughter of Nero and Poppaea Sabina

Claudia Augusta Augusta
- CLAVDIA
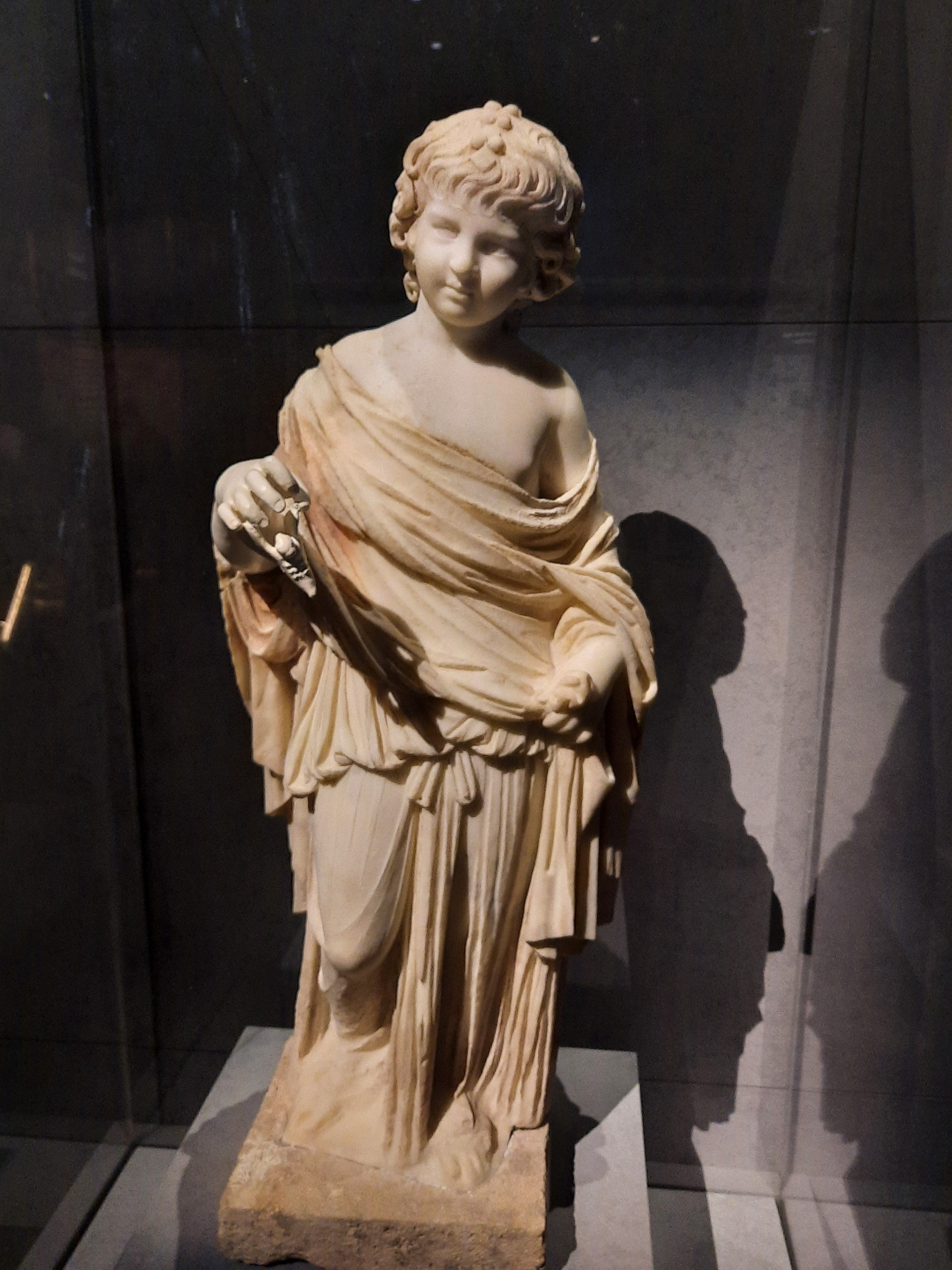
- Statue believed to possibly depict an older idealized Claudia.
- Born: Claudia; January 63 CE
- Died: April 63 CE
- Citizenship: Roman
- Era: Neronian
- Known for: Daughter of Roman emperor Nero
- Parents: Nero (father); Poppaea Sabina (mother)
- Family: Julio-Claudian
- Honours: Augusta

Claudia Augusta (Classical Latin: [ˈkɫau̯di.a au̯ˈɡʊsta]; January 63 – April 63) was the only daughter of the Roman Emperor Nero. She was born to the emperor's second wife, the Empress Poppaea Sabina. Claudia and her mother were honored with the title of Augusta by Nero. She was born in Antium in January 63 and died four months later of natural causes.

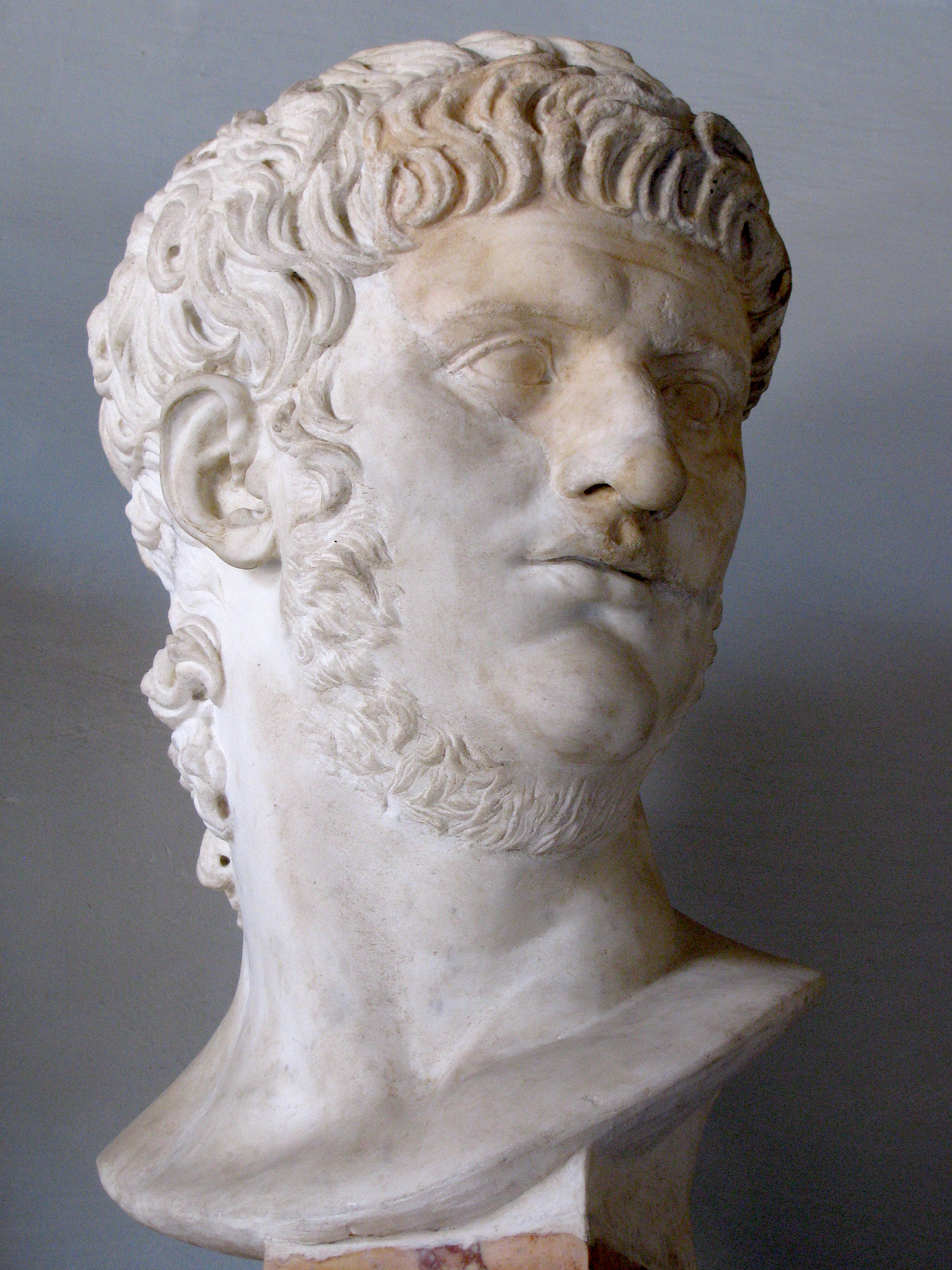
Her father, the Roman Emperor Nero

To celebrate her birth, the Senate voted a public thanksgiving, a temple to be dedicated to the goddess of fecundity, games and commemorative contests in the style of Actium, golden statues of the two Fortunes set up on the throne of Jupiter in the Temple of Jupiter Optimus Maximus, and circus games in honour of the Claudian and Domitian families at Antium.

Nero and Poppaea Sabina mourned her death in a manner described as 'extravagant' by Tacitus. The Senate voted to deify her, and granted her a shrine, temple, and priest.

== Ancestry ==
Ancestors of Claudia Augusta

8. Lucius Domitius Ahenobarbus
4. Gnaeus Domitius Ahenobarbus
9. Antonia Major
2. Nero
10. Germanicus
5. Agrippina the Younger
11. Agrippina the Elder
1. Claudia Augusta
6. Titus Ollius
3. Poppaea Sabina the Younger
14. Gaius Poppaeus Sabinus
7. Poppaea Sabina the Elder

== See also ==
- Julio-Claudian family tree
