= Lucius Apronius =

Roman senator and military commander

Lucius Apronius was a Roman senator and suffect consul in 8 AD.

== Achievements ==
He became suffect consul in 8 AD, and was a military commander active during the reign of Tiberius.

Apronius shared in the achievements of Gaius Vibius Postumus and earned the ornamenta triumphalia for his distinguished valor in the Dalmatian revolt and the Germanic Wars, along with Aulus Caecina Severus and Gaius Silius in 15 AD. Once back in Rome, Apronius led a motion in the year 22 AD in the Senate that decreed that votive offerings should be made due to the successful prosecution of Gnaeus Calpurnius Piso, accused of murdering Germanicus in 20 AD.

In the year 23 AD, Apronius (along with a former proconsul of Africa, Lucius Aelius Lamia) vouched for the innocence of a man accused of supplying grain to Numidian insurgent Tacfarinas. However, as proconsul of Africa at the time, Apronius also severely punished a cohort of Legio III Augusta for their defeat at Tacfarinas' hands with decimation.

In 28 AD, as a legatus of Lower Germany in modern-day Belgium, Apronius led the combined forces from Upper Germany in the siege of a Roman fort, and soon defeated the Frisii in a pitched battle near the sacred grove of Baduhenna.

== Descendants ==
He is known to have had at least three children: one son, Lucius Apronius Caesianus, who became consul in 39 AD, and two daughters, one married to Gnaeus Cornelius Lentulus Gaetulicus, who became consul in 26 AD, the other to Marcus Plautius Silvanus, who became praetor in 24 AD.

Political offices
Preceded by Marcus Furius Camillus; Sextus Nonius Quinctilianus	Roman consul 8 (suffect) with Aulus Vibius Habitus	Succeeded by Gaius Poppaeus Sabinus; Quintus Sulpicius Camerinus
