= Poppaea Sabina the Elder =

1st century AD Roman noblewoman

Poppaea Sabina the Elder (c. 10 – c. 47 AD) was an aristocratic woman who lived during the Principate. During her lifetime she was famed for her beauty, but as Ronald Syme writes, her "fame and follies have been all but extinguished by her homonymous daughter", Poppaea Sabina the Younger.

Poppaea Sabina was the daughter of Gaius Poppaeus Sabinus, homo novus and consul of AD 9. She had been the wife of Titus Ollius, who was a friend of the prefect of the Praetorian Guard Sejanus. He committed suicide following Sejanus' downfall. With Ollius she had a daughter who would be the future empress to Nero. After Ollius' death she married Publius Cornelius Lentulus Scipio, consul in AD 24. Scipio had a son by a previous marriage Publius Cornelius Lentulus Scipio the Younger (consul in AD 56). With Poppaea Sabina the Elder they had a son, Publius Cornelius Scipio Asiaticus, suffect consul in 68.

Her downfall came during the reign of the emperor Claudius. His wife, Messalina, desired to possess the Gardens of Lucullus which was owned by Decimus Valerius Asiaticus, consul in the years 35 and again in 46. Based on the gossip that Poppaea Sabina and Asiaticus had been lovers, Messalina directed her servant Suilius to accuse Asiaticus of treason, and accuse the pair of adultery. Asiaticus was tried in the emperor's private chambers, but instead of a guilty plea was allowed to commit suicide. Meanwhile, Messalina had agents harass Poppaea Sabina with threats of prison which led to her own suicide.
