= Lex Julia =

Ancient Roman law

A lex Julia (plural: leges Juliae) was an ancient Roman law that was introduced by any member of the gens Julia. Most often, "Julian laws", lex Julia or leges Juliae refer to moral legislation introduced by Augustus in 23 BC, or to a law related to Julius Caesar.

== Lex Julia de civitate (90 BC) ==
During the Social War, a conflict between Rome and its Italian allies over the extension of citizenship and Roman hegemony in Italy, the consul Lucius Julius Caesar passed a law granting citizenship to all Italians not under arms.

At the instruction of the Senate, Lucius Caesar proposed a law providing that each Italian community would decide as to whether they would take Roman citizenship and establish new tribes – possibly eight – in the Tribal Assembly for the new citizens. This grant to citizenship had the effect of almost tripling the number of Roman citizens and annexing large swathes of Italy into the republic proper. The offer would be open to all Italian towns which were not under arms or who would lay those arms down within a short period.

The main purpose of the law was to prevent those who had not risen up against Roman rule from doing so. It also had the effect of weakening the Italian war effort by making acceptable compromises. The next year, the Romans introduced the lex Plautia Papiria de civitate, granting citizenship to more allies under rebellion – the main exceptions were the Samnites and Lucanians – in an attempt to further stem rebellion.

== Julius Caesar's agrarian laws (59 BC) ==
Julius Caesar passed two pieces of agrarian legislation in 59 BC during his first consulship. They were two pieces of related legislation: a lex Julia agraria and a lex Julia de agro Campano. The first law was related to the distribution of public (both existing and purchased from willing sellers) lands to the urban poor and Pompey's veterans; the latter added public lands in Campania for distribution.

The passage of the first law was troubled. Caesar started his consulship by introducing it; it immediately met a filibuster from Cato the Younger. After being blocked in the senate, Caesar brought the bill before the popular assemblies. Inviting Marcus Calpurnius Bibulus, his co-consul and political opponent, to debate the bill, he won a political victory when he forced Bibulus to admit that he had few reasons for opposing the bill while publicly expressing senseless and obstinate opposition: "You will not have this law this year, not even should you all want it!". With the support of Pompey and Crassus, two influential senators with which Caesar was cooperating in a then-secret alliance, popular support for the bill grew. Bibulus resorted instead to obstruction tactics by declaring negative omens on every day the bill could be voted on; one day, when moving to declare those omens, he – along with his political ally Cato – was attacked in the street by a mob (almost certainly organised by Caesar and his allies), forcing him to return home. In the absence of an announcement of negative omens, Caesar carried the bill in the assembly.

Added to the law was then the requirement that senators swear an oath to uphold the law. Cato and an ally refused until intercession by Cicero, arguing that it would be better for Rome if Cato swore and remained than withdrew to exile. In the face of obstructive tactics from Cato's allies, Caesar brought the bill expanding the public lands subject to redistribution straight to the assembly, bypassing the senate.

== Lex Julia de repetundis (59 BC) ==
The lex Julia de repetundis, also called the lex Julia repetundarum, was passed by Gaius Julius Caesar during his first consulship in 59 BC. It was a major piece of legislation containing over 100 clauses which dealt with a large number of provincial abuses, provided procedures for enforcement, and punishment for violations.

Among other things, it:

- set limits on how much money governors could take from provincial treasuries and towns,
- required governors to produce detailed financial accounts, sealing and depositing them in two provincial cities with a third copy sent back to Rome,
- limited the possibilities that governors might demand ships, grain, and cash,
- required governors to remain in their provinces until a replacement arrived,
- limited governor rights to declare war or attack other realms without senatorial or popular consent,
- expanded the enforcement of the law to all officials on public business, and
- established various procedures, including details on trial proceedings, witnesses, jury voting procedures, etc.

The law also expanded regulations on all kinds of public actions, including corruption before the permanent courts, the senate, and public contracts (especially as to public works and grain). It also banned the owning of ships by senators.

While it extended to judicial corruption, "Caesar was prudent" in keeping away from the "political hot potato" that was anti-bribery legislation applied to the equites – diverse men including Cato and Pompey had previously tried and failed in passing such legislation. However, Caesar cooperated with an ally in introducing legislation to record the votes of the jury panels (senators, equites, and tribuni aerarii) separately, which "imposed a degree of indirect accountability without violating the secrecy of the individual verdict".

It was passed with little dissent, receiving "high praise from [Caesar's] contemporaries". Many senators contributed to it, including Cato, who may have proposed the addition of some regulations against extortion of provincial towns.

For centuries, the law remained "the basis of the Roman law of provincial administration".

== Lex Julia municipalis (45 BC) ==
This law may have set regulations for Italian municipalities. The question of whether Julius Caesar was responsible for this law is "fiercely debated".

== Augustus' moral legislation ==
Under Augustus, the leges Juliae of 18–17 BC attempted to elevate both the morals and the numbers of the upper classes in Rome and to increase the population by encouraging marriage and having children (lex Julia de maritandis ordinibus). They also established adultery as a private and public crime (lex Julia de adulteriis).

To encourage population expansion, the leges Juliae offered inducements to marriage and imposed penalties upon the celibate. Augustus instituted the "Law of the three sons" which held those in high regard who produced three male offspring. Marrying-age celibates and young widows who would not marry were prohibited from receiving inheritances and from attending public games.

=== Augustan leges Juliae ===
- Lex Julia de ambitu (18 BC): Penalising bribery when acquiring political offices.
- Lex Julia de maritandis ordinibus (18 BC): Requiring (likely) all citizens to marry. Also limiting marriage across social class boundaries (and thus seen as an indirect foundation of Roman concubinage (concubinatus), later regulated by Justinian, see also below).
- Lex Julia de adulteriis coercendis (17 BC): This law punished adultery with banishment. The two guilty parties were sent to different islands ("dummodo in diversas insulas relegentur"), and part of their property was confiscated. Fathers were permitted to kill daughters and their partners in adultery. Husbands could kill the partners under certain circumstances and were required to divorce adulterous wives. Augustus himself was obliged to invoke the law against his own daughter, Julia (relegated to the island of Pandateria) and against her eldest daughter (Julia the Younger). Tacitus adds the reproach that Augustus was stricter for his own relatives than the law actually required (Annals III 24)
- Lex Julia de vicesima hereditatum (AD 5): (on inheritance tax) instituted a 5 per cent tax on testamentary inheritances, exempting close relatives.
- Lex Papia Poppaea (AD 9): (to encourage and strengthen marriage) is usually seen as an integral part of Augustus' Julian Laws. The Lex Papia Poppaea also explicitly promoted offspring (within lawful marriage), thus also discriminating against celibacy.
- Lex Julia peculatus: concerning the embezzlement of public property and sacrilege for trial by a quaestio.

== Later updates to the Julian laws ==
The extracts below are from later legal codes and textbooks, but are also valuable in the sense that they are based on, and frequently quote from, the actual text of Augustus' laws.

=== Ulpian (3rd century) ===
As written down by Ulpian

The lex Julia relating to marriage
(Epitome 13–14) By the terms of the Lex Julia, senators and their descendants are forbidden to marry freedwomen, or women who have themselves followed the profession of the stage, or whose father or mother has done so; other freeborn persons are forbidden to marry a common prostitute, or a procuress, or a woman manumitted by a procurer or procuress, or a woman caught in adultery.

=== Justinian (6th century) ===
Under the rule of Emperor Justinian

The lex Julia on adultery
(Institutes 4, 18, 2–3) Public prosecutions are as follows… the Lex Julia for the suppression of adultery punishes with death not only those who dishonour the marriage bed of another but also those who indulge in unspeakable lust with males. The same Lex Julia also punishes the offence of seduction, when a person, without the use of force, deflowers a virgin or seduces a respectable widow. The penalty imposed by the statute on such offenders is the confiscation of half their estate if they are of respectable standing, corporal punishment and banishment in the case of people of the lower orders.

(Digest 4, 4, 37) But as regards the provisions of the Lex Julia… a man who confesses that he has committed the offence [i.e. adultery] has no right to ask for a remission of the penalty on the ground that he was under age; nor, as I have said, will any remission be allowed if he commits any of those offences which the statute punishes in the same way as adultery; as, for example, if he marries a woman who is detected in adultery and he declines to divorce her, or where he makes a profit from her adultery, or accepts a bribe to conceal illicit intercourse which he detects, or lends his house for the commission of adultery or illicit intercourse within it; youth, as I said, is no excuse in the face of clear enactments, when a man who, though he appeals to the law, himself transgresses it.

== See also ==
- Roman law
- List of Roman laws
