= A Dictionary of Greek and Roman Antiquities =

English language encyclopedia

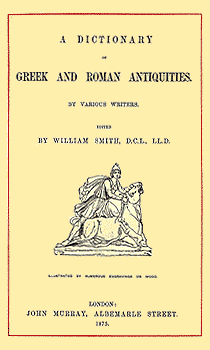
- Author: Sir William Smith
- Original title: A Dictionary of Greek and Roman Antiquities
- Language: English
- Published: 1842
- Publisher: John Murray
- Publication place: England

A Dictionary of Greek and Roman Antiquities is an English language encyclopedia first published in 1842. The second, improved and enlarged, edition appeared in 1848, and there were many revised editions up to 1890. The encyclopedia covered law, architecture, warfare, daily life, and similar subjects primarily from the standpoint of a classicist. It was one of a series of reference works on classical antiquity by William Smith, the others covering persons and places. It runs to well over a million words in any edition, and all editions are now in the public domain.

== See also ==
- Dictionary of Greek and Roman Geography
- Dictionary of Greek and Roman Biography and Mythology
