= Titus Ollius =

Father of empress Poppaea Sabina

Titus Ollius (died AD 31) was a prominent Roman citizen and the father of Poppaea Sabina, the Empress consort of the Roman Empire. His origins lay in Cupra Maritima, a town of Picenum; an inscription found there bears his name and that of three of his freedmen. Ollius was implicated in Sejanus' conspiracy against Tiberius, and committed suicide.

== Ancestry ==
Titus was Nero's father-in-law (#6 below).

Ancestors of Titus Ollius

16. Gnaeus Domitius Ahenobarbus
8. Lucius Domitius Ahenobarbus
17. Aemilia Lepida
4. Gnaeus Domitius Ahenobarbus
18. Mark Antony
9. Antonia Major
19. Octavia Minor
2. Nero
20. Nero Claudius Drusus
10. Germanicus
21. Antonia Minor
5. Agrippina the Younger
22. Marcus Vipsanius Agrippa
11. Agrippina the Elder
23. Julia the Elder
1. Claudia Augusta
6. Titus Ollius
3. Poppaea Sabina the Younger
14. Gaius Poppaeus Sabinus
7. Poppaea Sabina the Elder
