= Papia gens =

Family in ancient Rome

The gens Papia was a plebeian family at ancient Rome. Members of this gens are first mentioned at the time of the Samnite Wars, but do not appear at Rome until the final century of the Republic. Marcus Papius Mutilus was the only member of the family to attain the consulship, which he held in AD 9.

== Origin ==
The Papii were probably of Samnite origin, and several of this family appear in history in connection with the Samnite Wars and the Social War. Chase lists Papius among those gentilicia which were of Oscan derivation, in this case from the Oscan cognomen Papus, of which another cognomen, Papilus, appears to be a cognate. However, the Papii themselves maintained that they had come from Lanuvium, an ancient city of Latium, and a coin of the gens alludes to one of the founding myths of Lavinium, a town with which Lanuvium was frequently confounded.

== Praenomina ==
The Papii who appear in ancient historians and achieved prominence at Rome bore the praenomina Gaius, Lucius, and Marcus, the three most common names throughout Roman history. From the filiation of the consul Mutilus, we know that the Papii had also used Numerius, a much less common name, frequently although not exclusively associated with families of Samnite origin.

== Branches and cognomina ==
Among the cognomina borne by the Papii at Rome were Celsus, Mutilus, and Faustus. Celsus would have been given to someone who was conspicuously tall, while Mutilus refers to someone maimed or deformed. Faustus, meaning "fortunate" or "lucky", was an old praenomen that came into widespread use as a surname during imperial times.

== Members ==
This list includes abbreviated praenomina. For an explanation of this practice, see filiation.

- Publius Papius, quaestor in 409 BC, and his colleague, Quintus Silius, were the first two plebeians to hold that office.
- Papius Brutulus, a Samnite, who encouraged his people to resist Rome during the Second Samnite War.
- Gaius Papius Mutilus, leader of the Samnites during the Social War. In 90 BC, he invaded Campania with great success, before suffering a strong defeat by the consul Lucius Julius Caesar. In the following year he was totally defeated by Sulla, and fled to Aesernia. He probably perished a few years later, in the proscriptions of Sulla.
- Lucius Papius, one of the triumvir monetalis in 79 BC.
- Papia, one of the wives of Oppianicus.
- Gaius Papius, tribune of the plebs in 65 BC, was the author of a lex Papia expelling non-citizens from Rome, and punishing those who had wrongfully assumed the Roman franchise. (Note: Valerius Maximus refers to this law in connection with the father of Marcus Perperna, consul in 130 BC, who was condemned following the death of his son; but Cassius Dio states that the lex Papia was passed in 65 BC, and Cicero speaks of it as a recent enactment, so in all probability Perperna was prosecuted under some earlier law.)
- Lucius Papius L. f. Celsus, triumvir monetalis in 45 BC. He minted a number of coins alluding to the foundation myth of Lavinium, depicting a wolf bringing dry wood to feed the fire that cleared land for the town, and an eagle that fanned the flames with its wings.
- Marcus Papius M. f. N. n. Mutilus, consul suffectus ex Kal. Jul. in AD 9, was one of the authors of the lex Papia Poppaea, a law intended to discourage adultery and encourage lawful marriage. He is probably the same Papius Mutilus listed by Tacitus among the senators who chose to flatter Tiberius in AD 16.
- Papius Faustus, one of the senators put to death without a trial by Septimius Severus, in the belief that he had sided with his rival Clodius Albinus.

== See also ==
- List of Roman gentes

== Bibliography ==
- Marcus Tullius Cicero, De Lege Agraria contra Rullum, De Officiis, Epistulae ad Atticum, Pro Archia Poeta, Pro Balbo, Pro Cluentio.
- Diodorus Siculus, Bibliotheca Historica (Library of History).
- Titus Livius (Livy), History of Rome.
- Marcus Velleius Paterculus, Compendium of Roman History.
- Valerius Maximus, Factorum ac Dictorum Memorabilium (Memorable Facts and Sayings).
- Publius Cornelius Tacitus, Annales.
- Appianus Alexandrinus (Appian), Bellum Civile (The Civil War).
- Lucius Cassius Dio Cocceianus (Cassius Dio), Roman History.
- Aelius Lampridius, Aelius Spartianus, Flavius Vopiscus, Julius Capitolinus, Trebellius Pollio, and Vulcatius Gallicanus, Historia Augusta (Augustan History).
- Paulus Orosius, Historiarum Adversum Paganos (History Against the Pagans).
- Dictionary of Greek and Roman Biography and Mythology, William Smith, ed., Little, Brown and Company, Boston (1849).
- Dictionary of Greek and Roman Antiquities, William Smith, ed., Little, Brown, and Company, Boston (1859).
- George Davis Chase, "The Origin of Roman Praenomina", in Harvard Studies in Classical Philology, vol. VIII (1897).
- Paul von Rohden, Elimar Klebs, & Hermann Dessau, Prosopographia Imperii Romani (The Prosopography of the Roman Empire, abbreviated PIR), Berlin (1898).
- T. Robert S. Broughton, The Magistrates of the Roman Republic, American Philological Association (1952).
- John C. Traupman, The New College Latin & English Dictionary, Bantam Books, New York (1995).
