= Lex Papia Poppaea =

Ancient Roman law

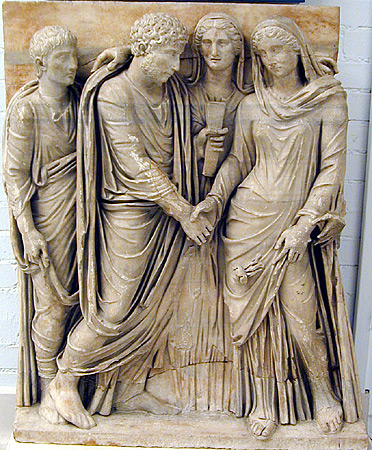
Relief showing a Roman marriage ceremony. Museo di Capodimonte

The Lex Papia et Poppaea, also referred to as the Lex Iulia et Papia, was a Roman law introduced in 9 AD to encourage and strengthen marriage. It included provisions against adultery and against celibacy after a certain age and complemented and supplemented Augustus' Lex Iulia de maritandis ordinibus of 18 BC and the Lex Iulia de adulteriis coercendis of 17 BC. The law was introduced by the suffect consuls of that year, Marcus Papius Mutilus and Quintus Poppaeus Secundus, although they themselves were unmarried.

== History ==
Tacitus mentions several leges Iuliae (Julian Laws) pertaining to morals and marriage, and the Lex Papia Poppaea as a separate later law, refining the Julian Laws (Annals, 3.25)

Some writers conclude from the passage in Suetonius (Suet. Aug. 14) that the Lex Julia de maritandis ordinibus of 18/17 BC was rejected, and add that it was not enacted until 4 AD. In the year 9 AD, and in the consulship of Marcus Papius Mutilus and Quintus Poppaeus Secundus (consules suffecti), another law was passed as a kind of amendment and supplement to the former law, and hence arose the title of Lex Julia et Papia Poppaea by which these two laws are often quoted. It has been inferred from the two laws being separately cited that they were not made into one.

The 6th-century Digest only mentions the Lex Julia de maritandis ordinibus (Dig. 38 tit.11; Dig. 23 tit.2).

Various titles are used according as reference is made to the various provisions; sometimes the reference is to the Lex Julia, sometimes Papia Poppaea, sometimes Lex Julia et Papia, sometimes Lex de maritandis ordinibus, from the chapter which treated of the marriages of the senators (Gaius, i.178; Ulp. Frag. xi.20; Lex Marita, Hor. Carm. Sec.), sometimes Lex Caducaria, Decimaria, etc. from the various chapters (Ulp. Frag. xxviii tit.7; Dion Cass. liv.16, lvi.1, &c.; Tacit. Ann. iii.25). (see References)

There were many commentaries on these laws or on this law by the Roman jurists, of which considerable fragments are preserved in the Digest: Gaius wrote 15 books, Ulpian 20, and Paulus 10 books at least on this law. The law contained at least 35 chapters (Dig. 22 tit.2 s19); but it is impossible to say to which of the two laws included under the general title of Lex Julia et Papia Poppaea, the several provisions as now known to us, belong. Attempts have been made both by J. Gothofredus and Heineccius to restore the law, on the assumption that its provisions are reducible to the two general heads of a Lex Maritalis and Lex Caducaria.

== Provisions ==
=== Suitability of the match ===
The provisions of these laws forbade the marriage of a senator or a senator's sons with a manumitted slave (libertina); with a woman whose profession made her infamis, such as a stage performer; or with a prostitute. A senator's daughter could not marry a libertinus.

If an hereditas or a legatum (inheritance) was left to a person on condition of not marrying, or on conditions which in effect prevented marriage, the conditions were illegal, and the gift was unconditional. The condition, however, might be not to marry a certain specified person or certain specified persons; or it might be to marry a particular person, but then the person must be such a one as would be a suitable match, otherwise the condition would be, in effect, a condition not to marry, and therefore void (Dig.35 tit.1 s63).

=== Promotion of marriage ===
In order to promote marriage, various penalties were imposed on those who lived in a state of celibacy after a certain age. Caelibes could not take an hereditas or a legacy (legatum); but if a person was caelebs at the time of the testator's death, and was not otherwise disqualified (jure civili), he might take the hereditas or legatum, if he obeyed the law within one hundred days, that is, if he married within that time (Ulp. Frag. xvii.1).

If he did not comply with the law, the gift became caducum (subject to escheat). The Lex Julia allowed widows a term of one year (vacatio) from the death of a husband, and divorced women a term (vacatio) of six months from the time of the divorce, within which periods they were not subject to the penalties of the lex: the Lex Papia extended these periods respectively to two years, and a year and six months (Ulp. Frag. xiv).

A man, when he attained the age of sixty, and a woman, when she attained the age of fifty, were not included within certain penalties of the law (Ulp. Frag. xvi); but if they had not obeyed the law before attaining those respective ages, they were perpetually bound by its penalties by a Senatus-consultum Pernicianum. A Senatus-consultum Claudianum so far modified the strictness of the new rule as to give a man who married above sixty the same advantage that he would have had if had married under sixty, provided he married a woman who was under fifty; the ground of which rule was the legal notion that a woman under fifty was still capable of having children (Ulpian, Frag. xvi; Sueton. Claud. 23). If the woman was above fifty and the man under sixty, this was called Impar Matrimonium, and by a Senatus-consultum Calvitianum it was entirely without effect as to releasing from incapacity to take legata and dotes. On the death of the woman, therefore, the dos became caduca.

By the Lex Papia Poppaea a candidate who had several children was preferred to one who had fewer (Tacit. Ann. xv.19; Plin. Ep. vii.16). Freedmen who had a certain number of children were freed operarum obligatione (Dig. 38 tit.1 De Operis Libertorum); and libertae, who had four children, were released from the tutela of their patrons (Ulp. Frag. tit.29). Those who had three children living at Rome, four in Italy, and five in the provinces, were excused from the office of tutor or curator (Inst. 1 25; Dig.27 1). After the passing of this law, it became usual for the senate, and afterwards the emperor (princeps) to give occasionally, as a privilege, the same advantage that the law secured to those who had children. This was called the Jus Liberorum. Pliny says (Ep. ii.13) that he had lately obtained from the emperor, for a friend of his, the Jus Trium Liberorum (see also Ep. x.95, 96; and Dion Cass. lv.2, and the note of Reimarus). This privilege is mentioned in some inscriptions, on which the abbreviation I. L. H. (jus liberorum habens) sometimes occurs, which is equivalent to jura parentis habere. The emperor M. Antoninus provided that children should be registered by name within thirty days after their birth with the Praefectus Aerarii Saturni (Capitol. M. Ant. c9; compare Satire IX of Juvenal, line 84).

The law also imposed penalties on orbi, that is, married persons who had no children (qui liberos non habent, Gaius, ii.111) from the age of twenty-five to sixty in a man, and from the age of twenty to fifty in a woman. By the Lex Papia, orbi could only take one half of an hereditas or legatum which was left to them (Gaius, ii.286). It seems that an attempt had been made to evade this part of the law by adoptions, which a Senatus-consultum Neronianum declared to be ineffectual for the purpose of relieving a person from the penalties of the law (Tacit. Ann. xv.19).

As a general rule a husband and wife could only leave to one another a tenth part of their property; but there were exceptions in respect of children either born of the marriage or by another marriage of one of the parties, which allowed of the free disposal of a larger part. This privilege might also be acquired by obtaining the Jus Liberorum (Ulp. Frag. tit.xv, xvi).

== See also ==
- Roman Law
- List of Roman laws
- Jus trium liberorum
- Codex Theodosianus
