= Gennia gens =

Ancient Roman family

The gens Gennia was an obscure plebeian family of ancient Rome. No members of this gens are mentioned by Roman writers, but several are known from inscriptions.

== Members ==
This list includes abbreviated praenomina. For an explanation of this practice, see filiation.

- Gennia M. f., buried at Fabrateria Nova in Latium, in a tomb dating between the late first century BC and the early first century AD, built by her grandson, Marcus Trebellius Sextanus, who had been duumvir, military tribune, praefectus fabrum, and augur, for himself, his parents, Gaius Trebellius Sextanus and Purpurnia, and grandparents, Sextus Trebellius Sextanus and Gennia.
- Gennius Major, a centurion in the Legio III Augusta during the first half of the first century. One of his soldiers was the cornicen, or trumpeter, Titus Precilius of Lugdunum, who was buried at Ammaedara in Africa, aged thirty-five, with a monument from his fellow cornicines.
- Marcus Gennius M. f. Carfinianus, leader of a cohort of Aquitanian soldiers stationed at Deltum in Thracia in AD 82.
- Gennia Ɔ. l. Natalis, buried in a second- or third-century tomb at Rome, built by her husband, Gaius Valerius Sequens.
- Marcus Gennius Felix, a veteran of the Legio III Augusta, named in a decree of the governor Anicius Faustus, appointing Epagathus and Manilius Caecilianus caretakers of the public fields and fountains at the site of modern Bled Goursi el-Tahtani, formerly part of Numidia, circa AD 210.
- Gennius Marc[...], together with Flavius Marsa, made an offering to the god Bacax at Thaya in Numidia in AD 268.

=== Undated Gennii ===
- Aulus Gennius M. f., named in an inscription from Caldis in Numidia.

== See also ==
- List of Roman gentes

== Bibliography ==
- René Cagnat et alii, L'Année épigraphique (The Year in Epigraphy, abbreviated AE), Presses Universitaires de France (1888–present).
- Laura Chioffi, La raccolta epigrafica (The Epigraphic Collection), Museo provinciale Campano di Capua, Capua (2005).
- Stéphane Gsell, Inscriptions Latines de L'Algérie (Latin Inscriptions from Algeria), Edouard Champion, Paris (1922–present).
- Theodor Mommsen et alii, Corpus Inscriptionum Latinarum (The Body of Latin Inscriptions, abbreviated CIL), Berlin-Brandenburgische Akademie der Wissenschaften (1853–present).
- Zeitschrift für Papyrologie und Epigraphik (Journal of Papyrology and Epigraphy, abbreviated ZPE), Rudolf Habelt, Bonn (1967–present).
