= Tacfarinas =

Leader of rebellious Berber tribes against the Romans

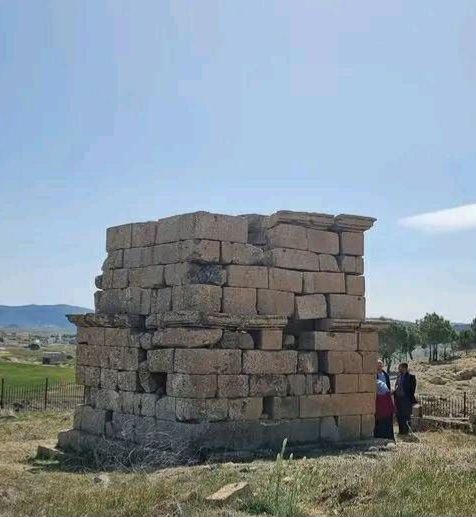
- Mausoleum of Tacfarinas near Bouïra, a type usually reserved for berber monarchs at the time
- Born: Khemissa
- Died: c. 24; Auzia
- Years active: 17-24 CE
- Children: Unnamed son

Map of the Roman Empire under Hadrian (AD ruled 117–138), showing the rough location of ancient Berber tribes on the fringes of the empire: Mauri, Musulamii, Garamantes, and Gaetuli. All four were engaged in bitter conflict with Rome during the rule of Augustus (30 BC – AD 14), and Tacfarinas was able to gain the support of substantial elements of all four tribes for his insurgency.

Tacfarinas (Latinised form of Berber Tikfarin or Takfarin; died AD 24) was a Numidian Berber from Thagaste, located in the province of Proconsular Africa (now Souk Ahras, in Algeria), who was a deserter from the Roman army who gained the support of the Gaetulian Musulamii tribe and a loose and changing coalition with his own Berber tribes in a war against the Romans in North Africa during the rule of the emperor Tiberius (AD 14–37). Though Tacfarinas' personal motivation is unknown, it is likely that the Roman occupation under Augustus of the traditional grazing grounds of the Musulamii was the determining factor.

Nevertheless, Tacfarinas' large-scale raids caused severe disruption of the province's grain production, which in turn threatened civil disorder in Rome. The Romans were for a long time unable to eradicate their enemy because of the Numidians' extraordinary mobility and their support from the many desert tribes. Tacfarinas was finally captured and killed in AD 24 by a combination of determined pursuit and a lucky break in intelligence.

A direct consequence of the war was the registration of the entire Tunisian plateau for land taxation and its conversion to mainly wheat cultivation. The Musulamii and other nomadic tribes were likely permanently excluded from what had been their summer grazing grounds and subsequently forced to lead a more impoverished existence in the Aurès mountains and the arid zone. The conflict also probably sealed the long-term fate of the client kingdom of Mauretania, which was annexed in AD 44 by the emperor Claudius.

== Sources ==
Apart from a passing mention by another (minor) author, the Annales by the Roman historian Tacitus (written c. AD 98) is the sole surviving ancient source on the Tacfarinas War. Tacitus gives a relatively detailed account, but its exclusivity makes it difficult to assess its accuracy and the war's significance. Tacitus was fascinated by the psychology of emperor Tiberius, whom he regarded as the quintessential flawed tyrant and the way that the long, drawn-out insurgency in Africa with its many crises exposed his weaknesses; as with, for example, the emperor's explosion of fury when he received envoys from Tacfarinas demanding concessions in return for peace. This was not only due to Tiberius' exasperation with the insurgency. Adding insult to injury, Tacfarinas was a commoner by birth, an affront to the status-conscious Romans. To Tiberius, a scion of the illustrious and patrician Claudia gens and ruler of a vast empire, it seemed intolerable that such a person should be seeking to deal with him on an equal basis like a foreign king. Tacitus relates with relish Tiberius' feelings of personal humiliation.

This has led C.R. Whittaker to doubt that Tacfarinas' revolt was ever a serious threat to Roman rule in Africa, suggesting that Tacitus may have exaggerated the war's importance for dramatic effect. In favour of this view is the inability of Tacfarinas' forces to take Roman fortified positions or to stand up to Roman armies in pitched battle; against it are Tacfarinas' establishment of a Roman-style force, the despatch of an extra legion to the war zone, and the award of triumphal honours to no less than three Roman proconsuls for successes in the war (implying, in each case, the killing of at least 5000 insurgents), all events indicating more than just low-level guerrilla warfare.

== Background ==
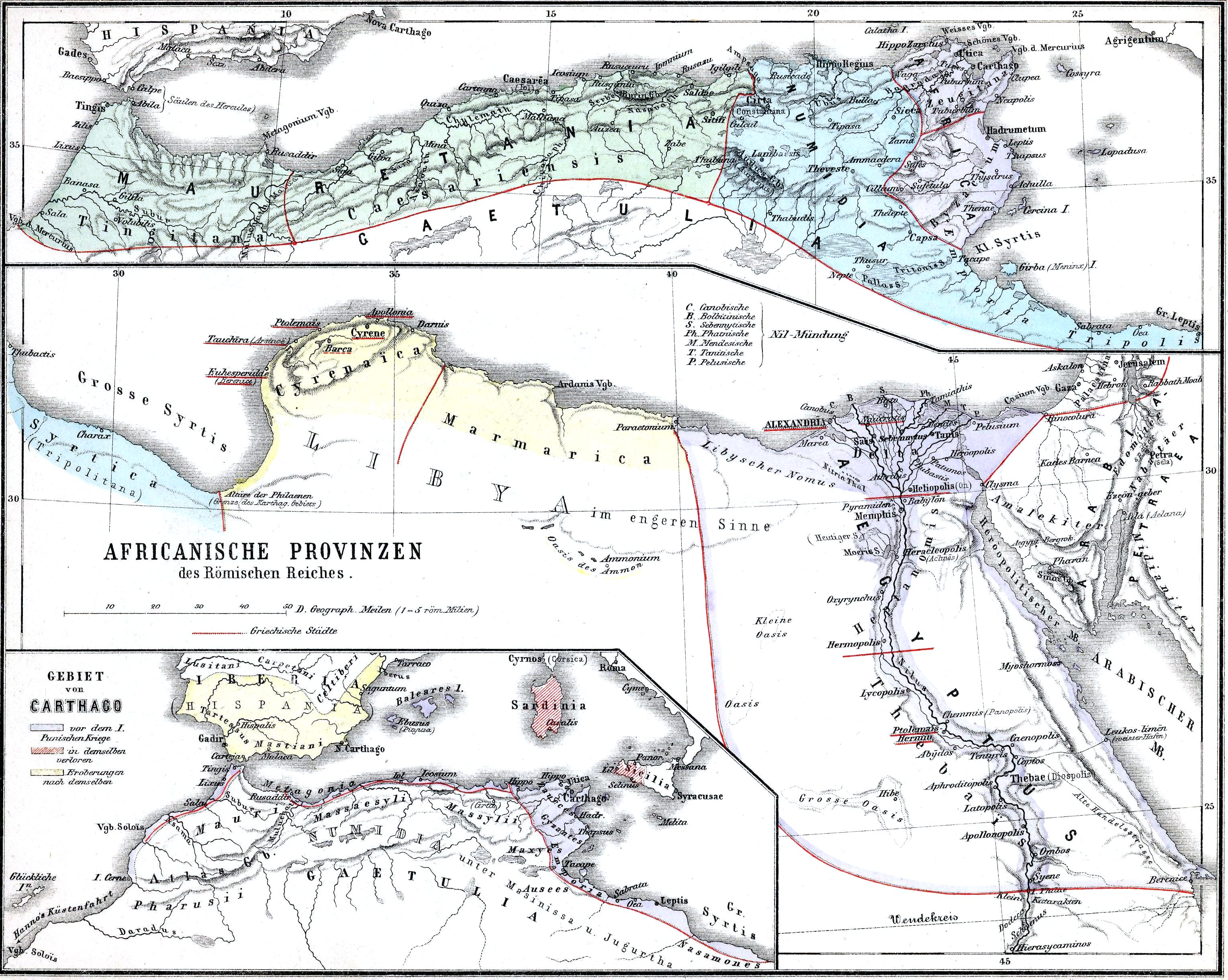
Map showing (top) the Roman province of Africa Vetus (mauve) and the Roman satellite-states of Numidia (blue) and Mauretania (green). In 25 BC, Numidia was divided into a northern part, which was annexed to Roman Africa, and a southern part, including Tripolitania (western Libya), which was added to Mauretania and placed under king Juba II, a reliable Roman client-king.

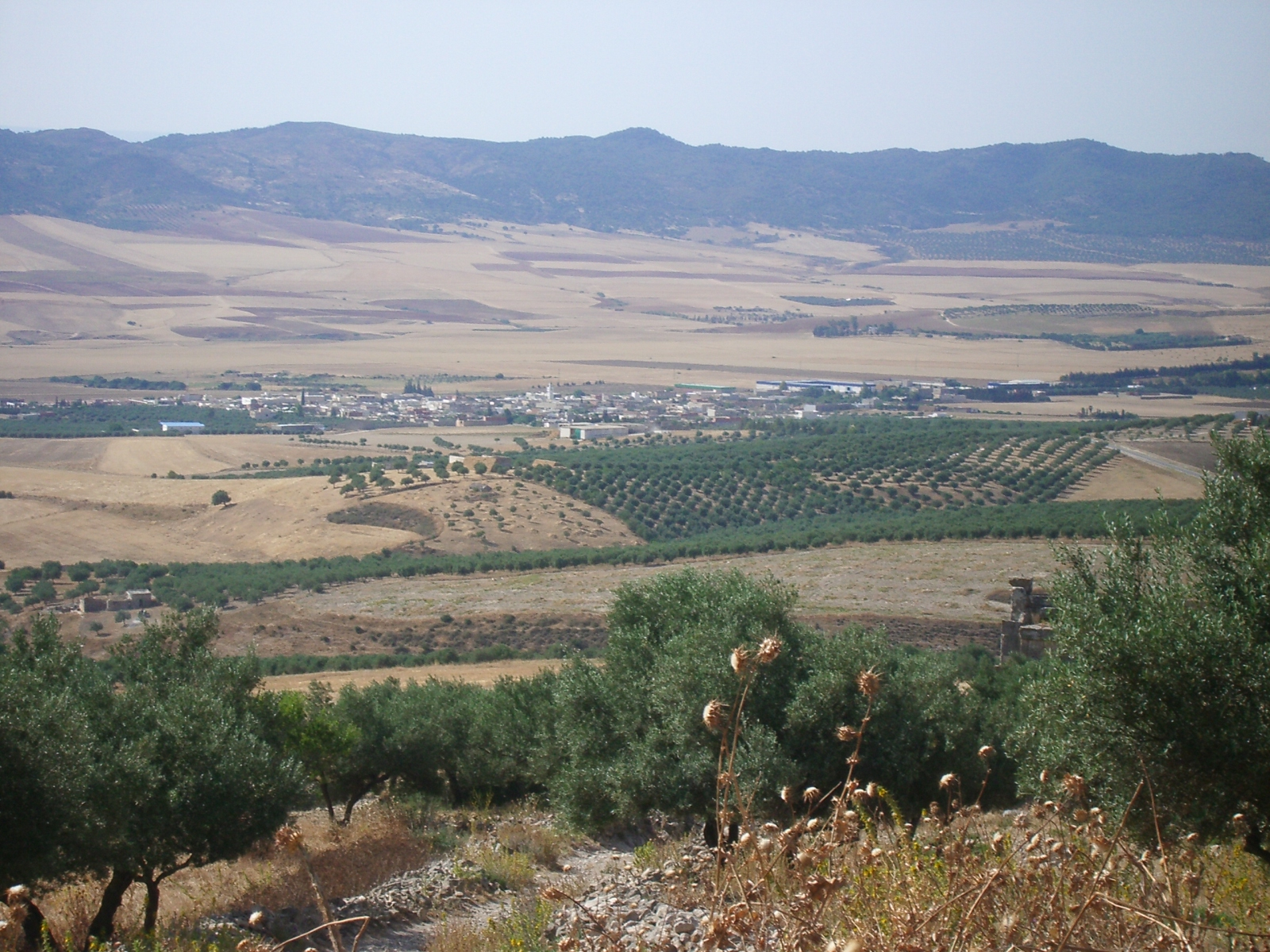
View of the central Tunisian plateau at Téboursouk, one possible location of the ancient Thubuscum, a Roman fort besieged by Tacfarinas in AD 24. This was prime wheat-growing country and supplied most of Rome's grain. It was the conflict between the demands of Roman agriculture and the traditional grazing rights of the Berber pastoralists that were the central cause of Tacfarinas' insurgency.

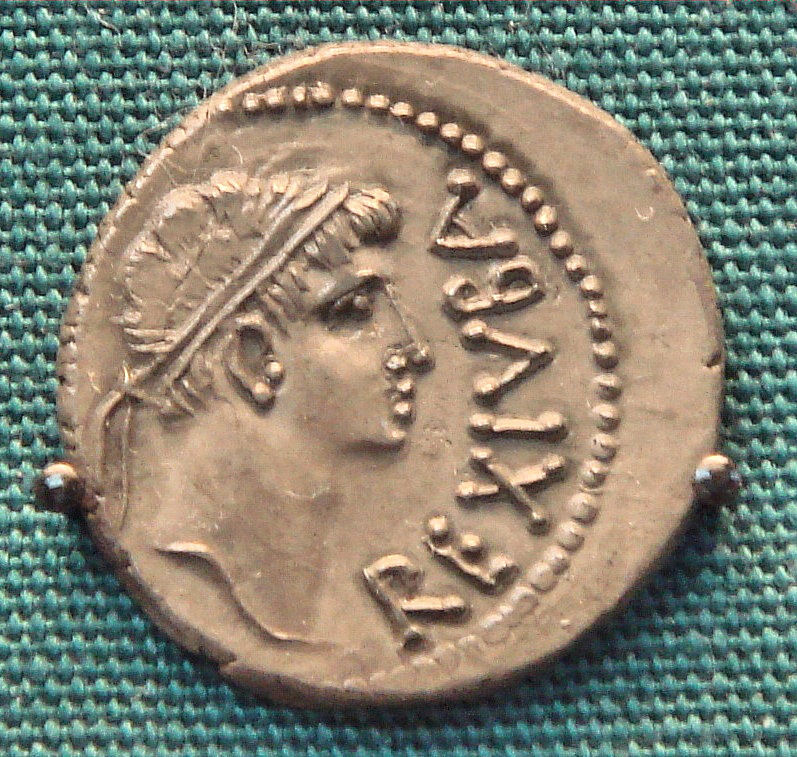
Coin of Juba II, king of Mauretania (ruled 25 BC – AD 23). Reverse: Idealised bust of Juba, with legend REXIUBA ("King Juba"). Educated in Rome, he was a personal friend of the emperor Augustus and a reliable Roman client-king.

=== Berber Africa ===
In Roman times, the indigenes of the Maghreb all belonged to peoples whom the Romans called, loosely east to west, the Libyae, the Afri (in what is now Tunisia and Algeria, from which the name Africa is probably derived), the Numidians (eastern Algeria), and Mauri (western Algeria and Morocco), from which the term "Moors" was derived.

North of the Atlas Mountains, the land was fertile and well-watered (there is evidence that rainfall was heavier than today and that the desert had not encroached as far north). The Berbers living inside the fertile zone were largely sedentary. In contrast, on the southern fringes existed tribes that led a semi-nomadic existence. They practised transhumance, living off herds of cattle, sheep, and goats. They spent the summers on the central plateau of Tunisia and the Aurès of northeast Algeria, where there was good grazing for the animals. In winter, they lived around the chotts (pronounced "shots") around Lake Tritonis, a string of large salt lakes on the desert southern fringes of the Roman province. In winter, this region contained plentiful freshwater in the form of seasonal torrents from the Aurès mountains to the North. These tribes included the Gaetuli, Musulamii, and Garamantes, as well as the nomadic elements of the Mauri.

=== Roman province of Africa ===
Africa Vetus ("Old Africa"), the land territory of Phoenician Carthage (roughly corresponding to modern northeastern Algeria and Tunisia), fell into Roman hands after the final defeat and destruction of Carthage at the end of the Third Punic War (146 BC). The fertility of its soil was proverbial among the Romans, far greater than it is today. The province was populous (c. 1.5 million inhabitants, roughly the same as contemporary Britain) and was, by 50 BC, the most important source of the City of Rome's grain supply. It was said that Africa fed the Roman populace for eight months of the year, while Egypt provided the remaining four months' supply. The province was a land of vast estates (latifundia) owned by absentee landlords. Pliny the Elder states that in the time of the emperor Nero (ruled 54–68), half of all arable land in the province was owned by just six Roman senators. Until 45 BC, the rest of northwest Africa was organised as two Berber Roman satellite-states, Numidia (Tripolitania, western Tunisia/eastern Algeria) and Mauretania (central/western Algeria and Morocco).

In 45 BC, Roman dictator perpetuus Julius Caesar defeated and killed king Juba I, and annexed his kingdom of Numidia to the Roman province, calling it Africa Nova ("New Africa"). This, however, dispossessed the ancient pro-Roman dynasty of Numidian kings founded by Massinissa, whose decision during the Second Punic War to switch allegiance from Carthage had been critical to the decisive Roman victory at the Battle of Zama 158 years earlier. The Numidian king's young son, Juba II, was brought up and educated at Rome, where he became a close friend of Caesar's grand-nephew Octavian, who assumed the title of Augustus after he became sole ruler of the Roman empire in 30 BC.

Caesar's settlement was modified in 25 BC by Augustus. He placed Juba II on the vacant throne of Mauretania, and added to it the southern and eastern parts of Africa Nova. Juba thus nominally ruled a vast realm stretching from the Strait of Gibraltar in the west to Cyrenaica in the east. Augustus' strategic conception was that Juba's native warriors would provide the Roman province's first line of defence against incursions by the nomadic desert tribes. But Juba proved unequal to the task, not least because the fiercely independent desert tribes refused to recognise his overlordship, despising him as a tool of Roman imperialism.

=== Conflict with nomadic tribes ===
The most fertile part of Numidia was retained in the Roman province. This part included Eastern Algeria and the central Tunisian plateau, land ideal for the cultivation of wheat, for which the Romans had an ever-increasing demand. The region, some 27,000 km^{2} in area, offered the prospect of doubling the province's grain production. At some point in the first half of Augustus' rule, it appears that the single legion deployed in the province (the III Augusta) was stationed at Theveste (modern Tébessa, Algeria), strategically placed on the western edge of the plateau so as to protect it from incursions from the Aurès mountains. (Later, during Tacfarinas' insurgency, the 3rd legion's base was moved to Ammaedara – modern Haïdra, Tunisia – right in the centre of the plateau). The road northeast to the provincial capital at Carthage bisected the plateau. In AD 14, Legio III is recorded as having built a new road southeast to Tacapae (Gabès) on the coast. Hand-in-hand with the Roman infrastructural expansion came the fencing off of land that was converted from pasture to wheat cultivation. The Romans also pursued a policy of deliberately restricting the transhumance movements of the nomads into the province.

The Tunisian plateau was also the traditional summer grazing region of the semi-nomadic Musulamii and Gaetuli. The result of Roman encroachment in this region was prolonged and bitter conflict between the nomads and Rome during Augustus' rule. His proconsuls in Africa fought a series of campaigns against the nomads: campaigns are recorded in 21 BC, 19 BC, c. 15 BC, c. AD 3, and AD 6, some large enough to gain triumphs for their generals, each of which implied the killing of at least 5,000 of the enemy. After AD 6, no major operations are recorded, but the conflict mutated into a chronic low-level guerrilla resistance to Roman rule. It was in this context of conflict that Tacfarinas grew up.

Still, the desert tribes' relationships with the Romans were not exclusively hostile. Many tribal nomads are known to have volunteered to serve in the Roman army, in both the regular auxilia and irregular native foederati (allied) units (although conscription was still common at this time, and was another cause of discontent). The army provided the prospect of a well-paid career that gave scope for the tribesmen's martial nature, which was highly regarded by the Romans. Numidian cavalry (equites Numidarum or Maurorum), which had played a prominent role in Roman armies since the Second Punic War (218–201 BC), were regarded as the best light cavalry in the Roman world. A Numidian cavalryman rode his small but agile and resilient desert mount without bridle, saddle, or stirrups, restraining it by a loose rope round its neck and directing it by leg movements and voice commands. Unarmoured, he was protected by just a small round leather shield. His weaponry consisted of several javelins. Exceptionally fast and manoeuvrable, Numidian cavalry would harass the enemy by hit-and-run attacks, riding up and loosing volleys of javelins, then scattering and retreating faster than any opposing cavalry could pursue. They were superbly suited to scouting, harassment, ambush, and pursuit. Numidian foot soldiers were also predominantly light infantry, relying on speed and manoeuvrability. However, both Numidian foot and mounted warriors were vulnerable in close-order combat with Roman troops, who mainly wore metal armour.

== Early life ==
Nothing is known about Tacfarinas' family background and early life, except that he was probably a member of the Musulamii tribe of Numidians and apparently not of royal or noble birth. Presumably, when he reached military age (i.e. around 20 years old), he enlisted in a Roman auxiliary regiment. It is unclear whether he volunteered or was conscripted, or whether he joined a cavalry or infantry regiment. He served for a number of years. (Note: Numidian auxiliary regiments: The Numidians were most noted for their light cavalry. But it appears that most Numidian cavalry in Roman service was at this time irregular, outside the regular auxilia. Only one Numidian ala is attested in the Augustan/Tiberian era (30 BC–37 AD), the ala Gaetulorum veterana. Five Numidian infantry cohorts are attested: cohors I Numidarum, I Gaetulorum, I Afrorum, Maurorum et Afrorum and I Musulamiorum.)

== Conflict with Rome ==
=== Camillus proconsul (AD 15–17) ===
At some point during his term of military service, Tacfarinas deserted. Gathering around him a band of marauders, he carried out many minor raids on Roman territory. Using his experience of the Roman military, he organised his ever-growing following into distinct units, to the point where he commanded an effective armed force. A political turning-point for Tacfarinas came when the disparate Musulamii clans accepted him as their paramount leader.

Thereafter, Tacfarinas rapidly gained the support of some of the Mauri, the western neighbours of the Musulamii, substantial numbers of whom were brought over by a leader called Mazippa, presumably a rebel against the Roman-installed king of Mauretania, Juba II. The Cinithii tribe who lived within Roman territory in southern Tunisia also joined him. While Tacfarinas trained a division of specially selected men into a Roman-style force, Mazippa led his traditional light-armed Mauri horsemen on devastating raids deep into Roman-occupied territory.

By AD 17, the Roman proconsul of Africa, Marcus Furius Camillus was in a quandary. The threat to his province was now far more serious than the usual border raiding by the desert tribes. But while Tacfarinas relied on hit-and-run raids, he had little effective response. Although Camillus' own forces (the 3rd legion and at least the same number of auxiliaries, totaling approximately 10,000 men) were now greatly outnumbered by Tacfarinas' followers, Camillus decided to capitalise on the Romans' advantages in armour and training by offering Tacfarinas a decisive pitched battle. To this end, he led out into the field most of his force. Tacfarinas felt confident that with superior numbers, his newly modelled army, combining the best elements of Roman and Numidian warfare, was equal to the challenge. His men joined battle with the Romans and were utterly routed. Tacitus gives no details on how this was accomplished, but later events suggest that the Numidian line was probably broken by the legionary infantry charge. Tacfarinas fled into the desert with the shattered remnants of his army and Camillus was awarded triumphal honours.

=== Apronius proconsul (AD 18–20) ===
But the Romans were much mistaken if they believed this battle to be the end of Tacfarinas. The latter proved a resilient and determined adversary. For the ensuing seven years, he waged a devastating war on the Roman province. But neither side was able to score a decisive victory. Tacfarinas could not defeat the Romans in conventional military operations such as pitched battles and sieges. The Romans, for their part, could not eradicate such a mobile enemy, despite inflicting severe defeats on him, as Tacfarinas enjoyed the ultimate resort of vanishing into the desert or the mountains, beyond the Romans' reach. In the meantime, Tacfarinas' raiding inflicted massive economic damage on the province. It is likely that the sky-high grain prices recorded at Rome during this period were caused by Tacfarinas' insurgency. These in turn threatened the emperor with civil disorder in the City of Rome itself: Tacitus records riots in protest at grain prices in AD 19.

In 18, Camillus was replaced by Lucius Apronius as proconsul of Africa. Tacfarinas launched a series of lightning raids on Roman territory, destroying the villages he had ransacked and disappearing into the desert before Roman forces could intervene. Emboldened by success, Tacfarinas attempted a conventional siege operation. His men surrounded a strategic Roman fort on the river Pagyda (location uncertain) held by a cohort of the 3rd legion. Its commander, one Decrius (presumably the cohort's most senior centurion - the pilus prior or "front spear" centurion), "considered it disgraceful that Roman legionaries should sit besieged by a rabble of deserters and tramps", Tacitus reports. (Note: Roman attitude to nomads: For the Romans, who harboured a lively contempt for "barbarians" (i.e. non- Greco-Romans), nomadic people, whom they termed inconditi ("tramps") or vagi ("drifters"), were the "lowest of the low". Hence, Tacitus' description of the Fenni (nomadic hunter-gatherers of NE Europe) as "astonishingly primitive and appallingly destitute" and of the Sarmatians, steppe horsemen of SE Europe, as of "repulsive appearance".) Decrius ordered a sortie. His troops tried to break through the besiegers, but were soon forced back by the far superior numbers of enemy. Decrius, cursing his standard-bearers for not standing their ground, shouted at his men to follow him. Although struck by arrows in one eye and in several other places, he rushed at the enemy. But his men retreated into the fort as their commander went down fighting. Roman soldiers were forbidden to retreat before an enemy unless ordered to do so by their commander. When Apronius was informed of the incident, he ordered the cohort to be decimated for cowardice. This ancient, extreme and rarely used form of military punishment required every tenth man in the unit (i.e. ca. 50 men in this case), chosen by lot, to be flogged to death in front of their comrades. The savage penalty "evidently had a salutary effect", according to Tacitus: at the next fort to come under attack by Tacfarinas, Thala (Thala, Tunisia, the site of a Roman victory over an earlier Numidian rebel leader, Jugurtha, some 120 years before), the garrison of 500 elderly veterans beat off the assailants.

The reverse at Thala impressed on Tacfarinas the difficulty of conducting conventional operations against the Romans. So he reverted to guerrilla tactics, retreating before the advancing Romans, then attacking their supply-lines in the rear. The Romans were soon exhausted and frustrated, unable to respond effectively. Eventually, however, the sheer volume of plunder that Tacfarinas had taken forced him to adopt a more stable base, near the Mediterranean coast in the puppet-state of Mauretania. Here he was surprised by a flying column of auxiliary cavalry and special light-armed legionaries under the proconsul's own son, Lucius Apronius Caesianus (presumably the 3rd legion's tribunus militum laticlavius - deputy commander). Tacfarinas was forced to flee into the Aurès mountains, abandoning most of his booty. For this result, Apronius (senior) was also awarded triumphal honours.

=== Blaesus proconsul (AD 21–23) ===
At this point, Tacfarinas sent envoys to Rome to offer peace in return for land in the province for himself and his followers. It is doubtful that this implied a desire by Tacfarinas' men to become sedentary farmers. More likely, they simply sought restored access to their traditional grazing grounds. If his demands were not met, Tacfarinas warned, he would wage a war without end on the Romans. Although this was probably a serious offer, Tiberius was outraged. He considered it the height of impudence that a man whom he regarded as a deserter and common brigand should be demanding terms like a foreign head of state. The offer was dismissed and Tacfarinas resumed hostilities. Tiberius now demanded that the Senate appoint an especially experienced general to command in Africa so that Tacfarinas could be dealt with once and for all. The man selected by Tiberius was Quintus Junius Blaesus, a veteran who as governor of Pannonia had narrowly escaped lynching by his troops in the great mutinies that broke out on Tiberius' accession in 14 AD. Blaesus owed his selection to his nephew, Sejanus, Tiberius' commander of the Praetorian Guard and trusted right-hand man. For the task, Tiberius gave Blaesus an additional legion (the IX Hispana, transferred from Pannonia on the Danube) and its attached auxiliary regiments, doubling the total force in Africa to around 20,000. He also authorised Blaesus to offer a general pardon to any of Tacfarinas' associates who surrendered - but not to Tacfarinas himself, who was to be captured or killed at all costs.

Installed in Africa, Blaesus issued his amnesty offer, which was successful in bringing over many of Tacfarinas' war-weary allies. The new proconsul also employed innovative tactics to deal with his elusive enemy. With a doubled contingent, he was able to cover Tacfarinas' various entry routes into the province more thoroughly, dividing his forces in three divisions covering the western, central and southern sectors respectively. He built a large number of new forts (castella), many very small, accommodating only a single century of troops (80 men). These were garrisoned year-round, as opposed to only in the campaigning season as previously. From these, small, highly mobile units of desert-trained troops would sally forth and keep Tacfarinas' bands under constant pressure. This system, similar to the blockhouses used by the British to suppress the Boer insurgency in the latter, guerilla phase of the South African War of 1899-1902, virtually extinguished Tacfarinas' raiding operations. Blaesus' campaign achieved its crowning success in AD 22, when his men captured Tacfarinas' brother. After this, Blaesus withdrew his troops to normal winter quarters in the province. Tiberius accepted this as marking the end of the war. He granted Blaesus the rare privilege of adopting the honorary title of imperator ("victorious general"), the last time this was accorded to a person outside the imperial house. When Blaesus returned to Rome at the end of his term in 23, he was also accorded triumphal honours, the third such award in the Tacfarinas War. The emperor now ordered the withdrawal of the 9th legion from Africa, confident that it was no longer needed. But Tacitus suggests that Blaesus and Tiberius were being over-optimistic about the situation, given that Tacfarinas himself was still at large with a substantial following.

=== Final defeat (AD 24) ===
In any event, the Romans were soon disabused of their complacency. The new proconsul, Publius Cornelius Dolabella, who arrived in 24, was faced by as grave a threat from the desert as had any of his predecessors. Tacfarinas' great strength was that there was an inexhaustible supply of would-be raiders among the desert tribes. So even if he lost many of his followers in encounters with the Romans, which he frequently did, he could rapidly reconstitute his raiding-bands. Moreover, Tacfarinas now started posing as the leader of a war of national liberation. He used the news of the withdrawal of half the Roman garrison to spread rumours that the empire was crumbling due to native revolts in its other regions, forcing the Romans to run down their forces in Africa. He claimed that the remaining garrison could be overcome, and Numidia permanently freed, by a concerted effort of all Numidians. His propaganda was highly effective. He was joined by large numbers of Mauri warriors who turned their backs on their young pro-Roman king, Ptolemy, who had recently succeeded his father, Juba II. In addition, many Libyphoenician peasants, the poorest stratum of African society, abandoned their fields and joined the insurgents. Tacfarinas also received "deniable" assistance from the king of the Garamantes, who, although officially allied with Rome, was making handsome profits as receiver of Tacfarinas' plunder and made little effort to prevent substantial numbers of his warriors from joining the insurgents. Given the emergency, Dolabella would have been justified in requesting the postponement of the 9th legion's imminent departure, but he did not dare to confront Tiberius with the grim reality of the situation in Africa.

By the start of the AD 24 campaign-season, Tacfarinas felt strong enough to lay siege to the Roman strongpoint of Thubursicum (Khamissa, Algeria or Teboursouk, Tunisia). Dolabella hurriedly assembled all his available troops and rushed to raise the siege. Once again, the Numidians proved unable to withstand the Roman infantry charge and were routed on first assault and fled westwards into Mauretania. Dolabella now embarked on an all-out effort to hunt down the ever-elusive Tacfarinas, as it was evident that, unless its leader was eliminated, the insurgency would never end. The proconsul summoned assistance from Ptolemy, in whose kingdom Tacfarinas had taken refuge, and who supplied large numbers of those Mauri horse who had remained loyal to him. Thus reinforced, Dolabella divided his force into four divisions advancing in parallel to cover as much territory as possible, with the allied cavalry acting as scouts, criss-crossing between the main columns. These tactics soon paid off, as the crucial intelligence was obtained that Tacfarinas had established a camp near the half-ruined fort of Auzea (Sour El-Ghozlane, SE of Algiers), which Tacfarinas' men had themselves previously burnt down. Well to the west of the Roman province, the site was surrounded by extensive forests and Tacfarinas evidently discounted the possibility that the Romans could discover his location, as he apparently failed to post a screen of sentries in the woods. In a repeat of Caesianus' raid four years earlier, Dolabella immediately despatched a flying strike-force of light-armed infantry and Numidian cavalry. They approached Tacfarinas' camp unobserved, under cover of the woods and the pre-dawn darkness. At the break of dawn, the Numidians, many of whom were still asleep and unarmed, and whose horses were grazing at a distance, were jolted awake by the clamour of Roman trumpets sounding the charge. The Romans attacked the camp in full battle-order as the disorganised Numidians scrambled to pick up their weapons and to find their horses. The complete surprise resulted in a massacre, made all the bloodier by the Romans' lust for revenge after years of hardship and humiliation. Acting on strict orders, the Roman centurions directed their men against Tacfarinas himself. The latter and his entourage were soon surrounded by overwhelming numbers, and in a fierce fight his bodyguards were killed and his son taken prisoner. Recognising that this time there was no possibility of escape, Tacfarinas impaled himself on the massed spears of his assailants.

== Aftermath ==
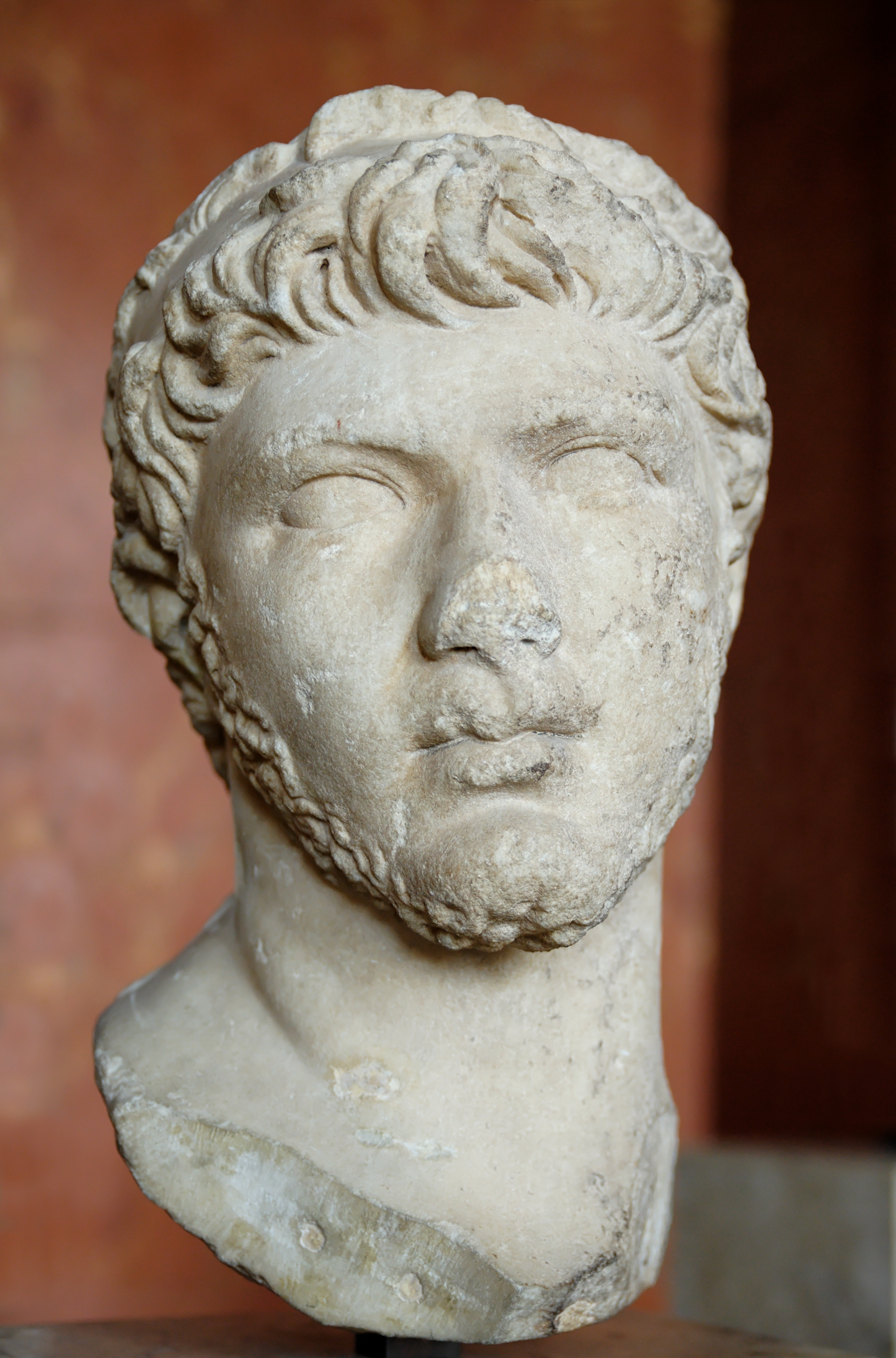
Bust of king Ptolemy of Mauretania, son of Juba II and last scion of the dynasty of pro-Roman Numidian kings founded by Massinissa in 201 BC. When he succeeded his elderly father as king of Mauretania in AD 23, thousands of his subjects joined the Numidian anti-Roman rebel Tacfarinas. But Ptolemy stood firm in his family's traditional support for Rome and his loyal warriors assisted the Romans in tracking down and killing Tacfarinas in AD 24. Thereafter, his popularity increased, and his arbitrary execution by the emperor Caligula in AD 40 sparked a violent anti-Roman uprising in Mauretania.

The death of Tacfarinas put an end to Musulamii hopes of halting the Roman takeover of their traditional grazing lands. The registration of the whole plateau for tax purposes was launched by Dolabella immediately after Tacfarinas' demise and completed in 29/30 AD, as evidenced by the stone markers laid down by the Roman surveyors, some of which survive to this day. They reach as far as the Chott el Jerid on the province's southern border. The region was largely turned to grain production and the Musulamii and other tribes were most likely permanently excluded from their former grazing areas.

Dolabella applied to the Senate for triumphal honours. But his motion was voted down at the behest of Tiberius, despite the fact that arguably Dolabella deserved the accolade more than any of his three predecessors, since unlike them, he had actually brought the war to an end by eliminating its instigator. Tacitus suggests that the reason was Sejanus' concern that his uncle's glory should not be diminished by comparison. Doubtless, Tiberius' embarrassment that the war had flared up again after he had declared it won also played a part.

The Garamantes, fearing that their own clandestine support for Tacfarinas may have been revealed to the Romans, despatched an embassy to Rome to protest their loyalty, although it is unknown how successfully. Ptolemy, king of Mauretania, was rewarded for his real loyalty by the title rex, socius et amicus populi Romani ("king, ally and friend of the Roman people" i.e. puppet-king). As a special token of esteem, the ancient ritual was revived, whereby the title was conferred in person by a Roman senator, who travelled to the king's capital with an accompanying gift of triumphal regalia: an ivory baton and a toga picta (all purple, with embroidered gold border).

Ironically, that same toga eventually caused Ptolemy's downfall, according to the Roman historian Suetonius. Many years later, in AD 40, the Mauretanian king wore it on a state visit to Rome as guest of the emperor Caligula (ruled 37–41). When the two leaders entered the amphitheatre together, the toga and its owner were accorded much admiration by the crowd. In an apparent fit of envy, the deranged emperor ordered Ptolemy's immediate execution. Beyond Suetonius' superficial explanation, it is likely that the Roman government was becoming concerned by Ptolemy's growing wealth and independence of action and that his removal from power, if not outright execution, was planned. Dio suggests that Ptolemy was executed because he had become too wealthy. Ptolemy had started issuing gold coins, which was the traditional prerogative of an independent head of state. Another likely factor was Ptolemy's distinguished pedigree, which gave him a dangerously broad appeal in north Africa. On his father's side, Ptolemy was the scion of the ancient Numidian dynasty founded by king Massinissa (ruled 201–148 BC), who was Ptolemy's direct ancestor in 5 generations. On his mother's side, he was the grandson of Mark Antony (the last Roman political rival to Augustus) and Cleopatra, the last pharaoh of an independent Egypt. It must have worried the Roman leadership that if Ptolemy ever turned against Rome, his pedigree, wealth and power could endanger the whole Roman position in north Africa.

Indeed, Ptolemy had by this time become a far more popular ruler than on his succession sixteen years earlier, when thousands of his Mauri subjects had defected to Tacfarinas. His execution sparked a massive anti-Roman revolt under one Aedemon, who is described as a freed slave in Roman sources but was more likely a Mauri prince. For the Roman military, the revolt proved as arduous as that of Tacfarinas and its suppression required the services of Gaius Suetonius Paulinus and Gnaeus Hosidius Geta, two of the finest generals of the Julio-Claudian era. After its end in 44, Caligula's successor Claudius decided to annex Ptolemy's kingdom, dividing it into two Roman provinces, Mauretania Caesariensis and Mauretania Tingitana. By this means, he brought the territory between Roman Africa and Roman Spain and the entire Berber nation under direct Roman rule.

== Bibliography ==
=== Ancient ===
- Cassius Dio Roman History (ca. 130 AD)
- Sallust De Bello Iugurthino (ca. 40 BC)
- Suetonius De Vita Caesarum (121 AD)
- Tacitus Annales (ca. 100 AD)

=== Modern ===
- Brett, Michael & Fentress, Elizabeth (1996): The Berbers
- Cambridge Ancient History (1996): Vol X Chapter 13(i): Roman Africa by C.R. Whittaker
- Grant, Michael (1996): Introduction to Penguin Classics translation of Tacitus' Annales
- Holder, Paul (2003): Auxiliary deployments in the Reign of Hadrian
- MacDonald, Eve (2012): Tacfarinas. The Encyclopedia of Ancient History (John Wiley & Sons, Inc.) doi:10.1002/9781444338386.wbeah18146
- Sidnell, Phillip (2006): Warhorse
- Smith's Dictionary of Greek and Roman Antiquities (1890)
- Vanacker, Wouter (2013): Conflicts and Instability in Mauretania and Gaius’ Realpolitik. Latomus 72 (3), 725-741

== See also ==
- Jugurtha
- Jugurthine War
- Juba II
- Ptolemy of Mauretania
