= Musulamii =

Confederation of the Berber Gaetulian tribes

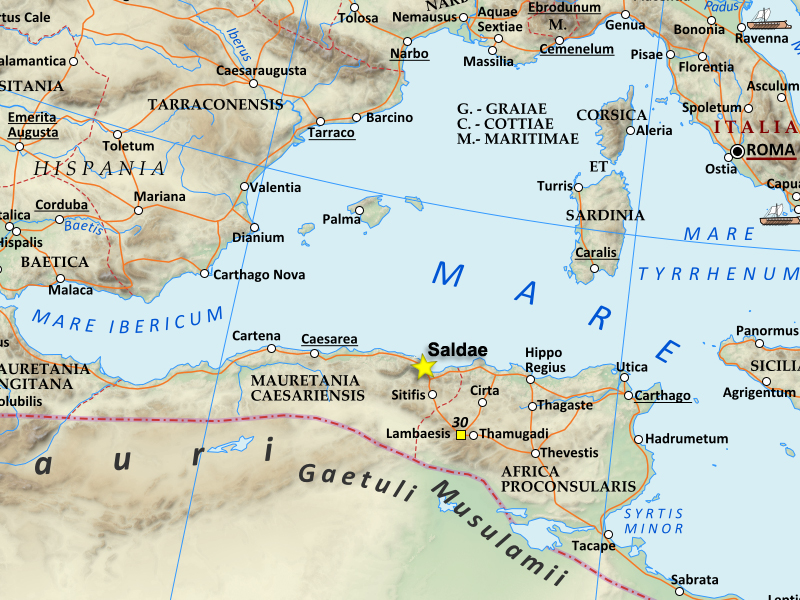
The Roman empire under Hadrian (ruled 117–138), showing the location of the Musulamii, then inhabiting the desert regions of modern Tunisia and Algeria

The Musulamii were a confederation of the Berber Gaetulian tribes, who inhabited the desert regions of what is today known as Chotts Regions in Tunisia and Algeria, as well as the Roman province of Mauretania Caesariensis, which was annexed to the Roman empire in 44 AD. They were indeed meant to be recognized as a member of these tribes and not separate, as Junius Blaesus the younger describes a war against Tacfarinas as a war against the Gaetulas Gentes ("Gaetulian Peoples").

== Region ==
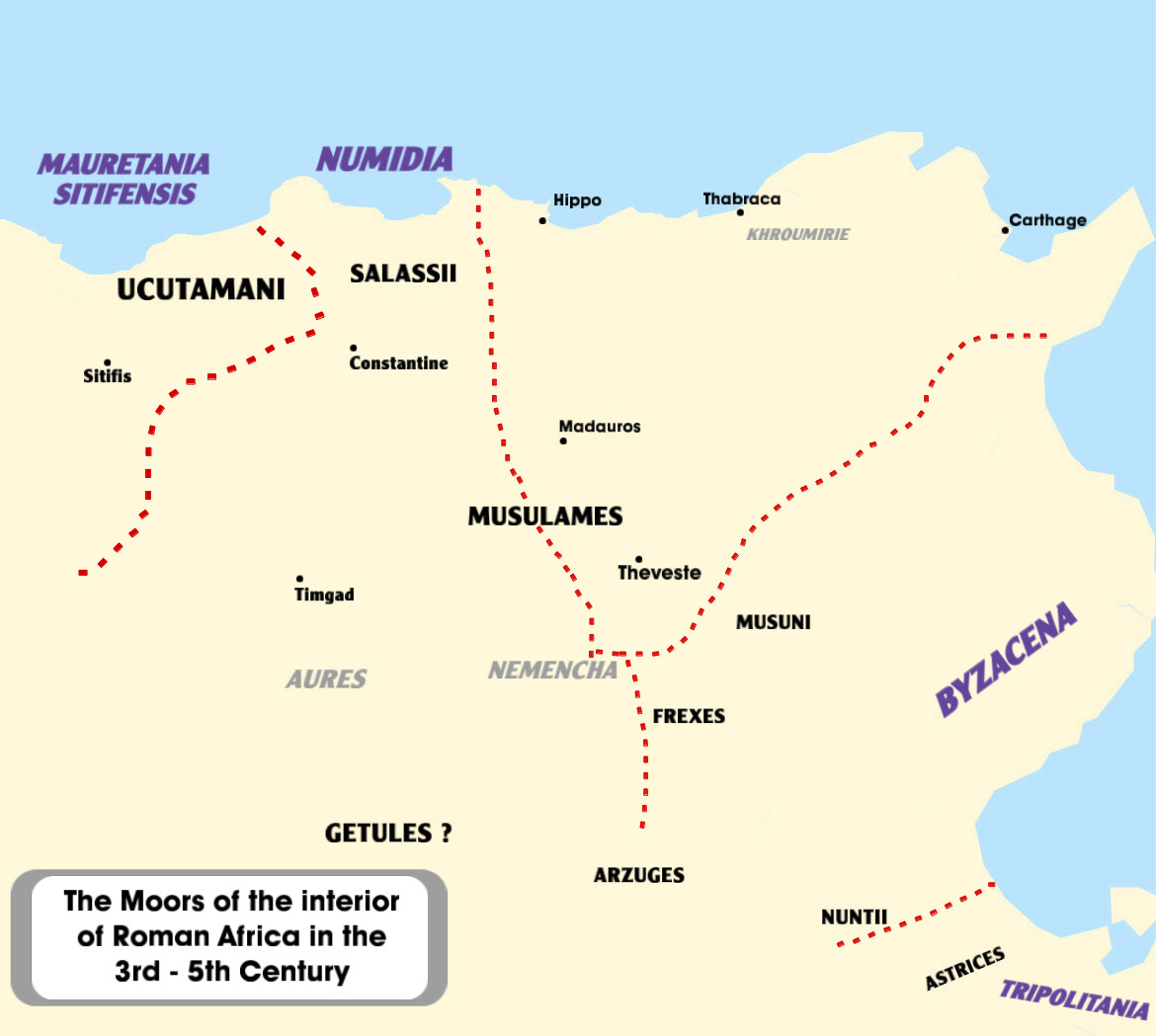
Map showing the Musulamii among the Moorish tribes of Roman Africa in the 3rd to 5th century

Originally noted to be located between Sicca and Theveste. They are also attested to have occupied the area between Thala and Madauros. Their capital was located in the Aures mountains. Two boundary stones that relate to the border between the Musulamii and the Roman imperial domains traced by Roman legate Minicius Natalis were discovered near Tebessa. It was felt that some control needed to be placed over the Musulamii due to the continuous and severe disturbances they created for Rome. So, the Musulamii were confined to a set plot of land defined by military colonies established for soldiers of Ammaedara, Madauros and Theveste where they were forced to learn sedentary farming on land not suitable for that. This area likely totaled around 80 kilometers. This meant that the best of their lands had been taken by the Romans for colonies or estates. Musulamii were nomads, so this greatly altered their lifestyle. However, there is some evidence that not all of the tribe of the Musulamii was there, but some remained nomads south of the Tebessa mountains.

== Military history ==
The Musulamii had their first major involvement with the Romans during the Gaetuli War. The wars lasted from AD 3 to AD 6 and the Musulamii played a relatively small role. In 17 AD the Musulamii tribe, led by Tacfarinas, rebelled against the Romans over the building of a road across Musulamii territory by the Third Augustan Legion. The Musulamii were joined in the conflict against the Romans by the Gaetuli and the neighboring Garamantes tribe. This was the largest war in the Algeria region of Roman North Africa in the history of Roman occupation. After their defeat in AD 24, the Musulamii ceased to appear in Roman military record.

== Bibliography ==
- Garnsey, Peter (1976). "Peasants in ancient Roman society". Journal of Peasant Studies 3: 221–235.
