= Capuan bust of Hannibal =

Ancient Roman bust

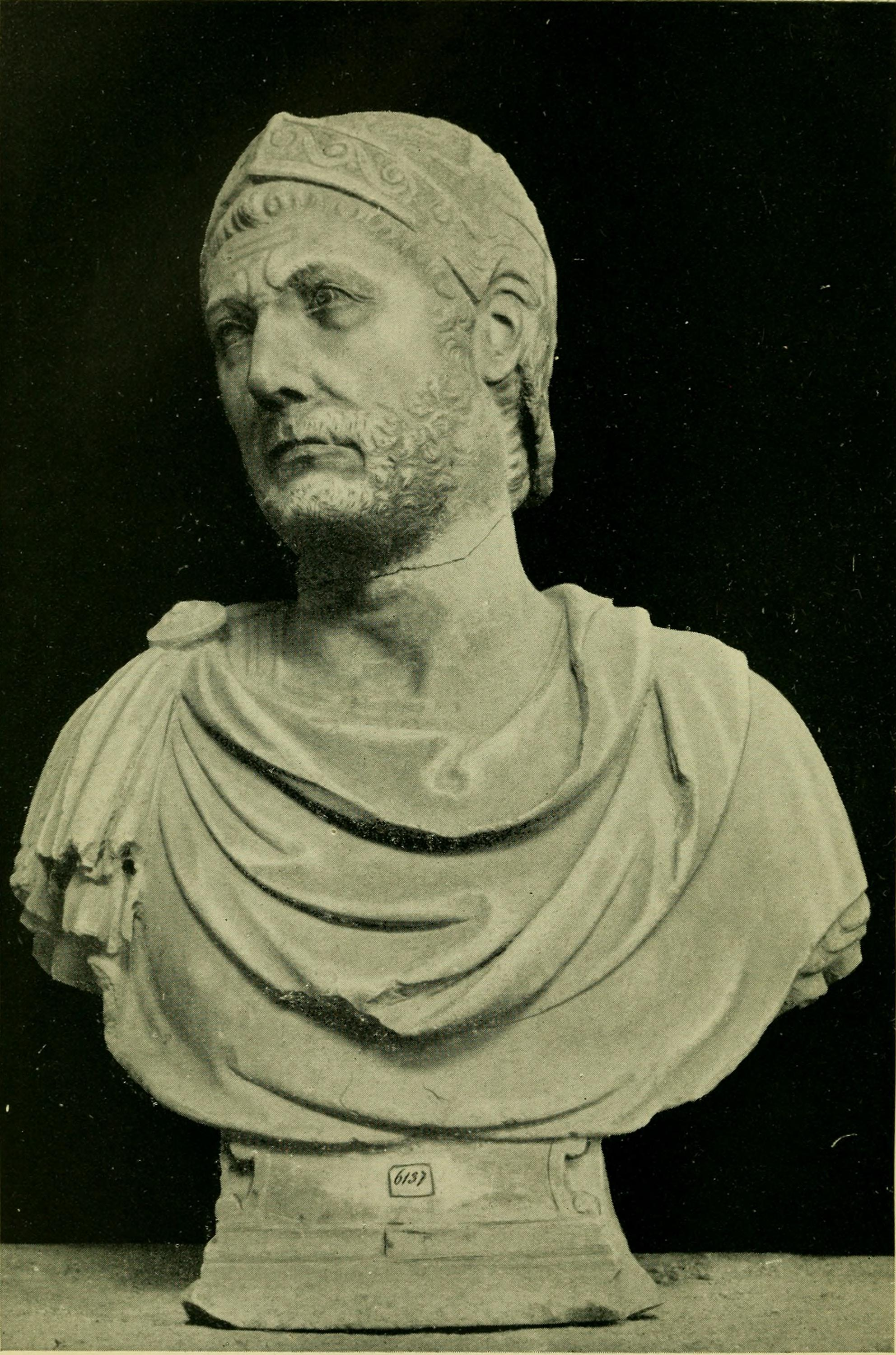
- Artist: Unknown
- Year: Unknown
- Medium: Marble sculpture
- Subject: Unknown, possibly Hannibal
- Location: National Archaeological Museum, Naples, Naples, Italy

The Capuan bust is a sculpture often identified as Carthaginian general Hannibal. Made of marble, it was discovered in the Italian city of Capua in 1667 and is housed in the Naples National Archaeological Museum. The bust is depicted on the five dinar banknote of Tunisia, 2013 series, the site of ancient Carthage.

== Identity ==
The bust's identity has been disputed. Naples Museum's catalogue of 1888 put a question mark in its attribution to Hannibal. According to Eve MacDonald, the bust features a cloak of a Roman commander (paludamentum). According to Australian historian Dexter Hoyos, there are "strong suspicions" that the bust is a Renaissance work rather than an ancient one.

19th-century iconographer Francis Pulzky believed the bust, instead of Hannibal, shows "the ideal representation of a hero" from the silver coins of Dernes of Phoenicia and Pharnabazus III.

British scholar W. H. D. Rouse defended the bust's identification as Hannibal. American historian Theodore Ayrault Dodge regarded the Capuan bust as the only portrait "which has any claim to authenticity".
