= Abdul Lateef Al Warari =

Moroccan poet and literary critic

- Born: 1972 (age 53–54)

Abdul Lateef Al Warari (Arabic: عبد اللطيف الوراري) is a Moroccan poet and literary critic.

== Biography ==
Abdul Lateef Al Warari was born in 1972 in the town of Awlad Amran, near the city of Jdeideh. After studying with the village Kuttab, he entered the school and continued his preparatory and secondary education in the city of Khemisset, to which he relocated with his family members after the death of his father, when he was seven years old.

He obtained a BA in Arabic Language and Literature from the Faculty of Arts and Humanities at Ibn Tofail University - Quneitra in 1996, on the topic “Rhythm of Arabic Poetry: Between Heritage and Modernity” under the supervision of Dr. Ibrahim Solami. And a certificate of in-depth studies in modern literature (specializing in poetry) from the Faculty of Letters and Human Sciences at Mohammed V University - Rabat in 1998, on the topic of “Accidental Adventure in Modern Arabic Poetry” under the supervision of Dr. Mohamed Bennis. He obtained a doctorate in Arts from the Faculty of Arts and Humanities at Ibn Zohr University - Agadir in 2018, on the topic “Autobiographical Discourse in Modern and Contemporary Arabic Poetry” under the supervision of Dr. Rashid Yahyaoui.

He graduated from the Higher School of Teachers in Rabat in 1997, and at that time completed a research on the topic: "From Education to Educational Technology" under the supervision of Dr. Muhammad Al-Harthy, and worked as a teacher of the Arabic language for the secondary preparatory departments in the city of Agadir, and organized workshops and poetry readings for the benefit of students.

He is currently working as a Professor of Modern and Contemporary Literature at the Faculty of Arts and Humanities Tetouan - Abdelmalek Essaâdi University.

He is a cultural correspondent for Al-Quds Al-Arabi newspaper and an article writer in it. For years, he has published regular articles that focus on critical and aesthetic issues and approach modern and contemporary literary texts.

He is a poet and member of the House of Poetry in Morocco. A number of critics wrote about his poetry, such as: Ali Jaafar Al-Alaq, Shawqi Bzei’, Alawi Al-Hashemi, Rashid Yahyaoui, Salah Faeq, Abdul Karim Yahya Al-Zibari, Abdul Rahman Al-Tamara, Muhammad Bujbeiri, Muhammad Budwick, Abdul Haq Mifrani, Abdul-Daim Al-Salami, Muhammad Al-Masoudi, Abd al-Razzaq Haidharani, Muhammad al-Dihaji, Rashid al-Khudiri, Saleh Laberini, Muhammad Benqadour al-Wahrani, Muhammad al-Asadi, Rashid Azroual, Abd al-Jabbar al-Gharraz, Muhammad al-Shekhawi, Rushdi al-Madhi and others. Samples of his poetry were selected within the files prepared by some Arab magazines on the new Moroccan poetry, such as: Thoughts and Criticism (Egypt), the Cultural Emirates (UAE), and Genius (Saudi Arabia). His critical research (transformations of meaning in Arabic poetry, criticism of rhythm) were also discussed in Moroccan and Arab university thesis.

The poet Nour al-Din al-Zwaitni translated texts into English for him on the poetry international web, and the poet Naser al-Din Bousheqif translated texts into French in his ontology prepared on Moroccan and French poetry under the title: (Poètes Français et Marocains) by Dar Polyglot - Paris 2013, then in issue N°76 of the literary magazine (Traversées), and the Al Habib Al Waai translated texts for him into English in the American magazine (Big Bridge), run by the poet Michael Rothenberg.

He is a researcher interested in issues of ancient and modern Arabic poetry; His texts, studies and dialogues have been published in a number of cultural and literary magazines: Nizwa, Doha, Al Rafed, Poetry House, Al Adab, Moroccan Culture, Palestinian Papers, Al Jasra, The Arab Magazine, Emirates Cultural, Dawat, Ibdaa, Tributaries, the poetic movement...etc. Or in Arab newspapers and cultural websites: As-Safir, Literature News, Poetry, Emperor, Middle East Online, Elaph, Diwan Al-Arab, Kika, Spaces, Culture Without Borders, the word...

He participated in poetry festivals, and in cultural symposiums inside and outside Morocco, with research papers, the most important of which are:

- "The Current Moroccan Poetry and Its New Sensitivities", a symposium on "Readings without Banks: The New Sensitivity and Its Creative Aesthetics", organized by the Al-Shula Association for Education and Culture (Tiznit, November 2007).
- "The Adventure of the Poem with Saadi Youssef", as part of the honor given by the Moroccan Ministry of Culture to the Iraqi poet in the activities of the fifteenth session of the International Book Fair (Casablanca, February 2009).
- "Lyricism in Arabic Poetry: An Attempt to Model", a creativity workshop organized by the Department of Culture and Information in the Government of Sharjah (Khor Fakkan - Sharjah, May 2009).
- "Moroccan Immigrant Poetry: Writing Exile and Questions of Experience", the academic session organized by the House of Poetry in Morocco on the topic: "New Sensitivities in Modern Moroccan Poetry" (Fez, May 2010).
- "Poetic Syntax Patterns in the Moroccan Prose Poem", the First International Forum for the Prose Poetry, organized by the Al-Hamra Center for Culture and Thought (Marrakesh, March 2011).

== Works ==
=== Poetry ===
- “Why did you bear witness to the promise of the clouds?” Dar Abi Regreg, in Rabat in 2005
- “What looks like a flute on its tracks”, the Merit Award from the Naji Noaman Literary Awards in 2007
- "Tariaq", issued by East West Publications, Beirut in 2009
- “A Memory for Another Day” Dar Al-Tawhidi, in Rabat in 2013
- “From the height of an abyss” House of Poetry in Morocco, Rabat in 2015

=== Criticism and Biography ===
- “Transformations of Meaning in Arabic Poetry” (first prize in criticism from the Sharjah Awards for Arab Creativity), issued by the Department of Culture and Information in Sharjah in 2009
- “Criticism of Rhythm: On the Concept of Rhythm and its Aesthetic Expressions and Mechanisms of Reception among Arabs” Dar Abi Regreg, Rabat in 2011.
- “Poetry and Prose in the Rhetorical and Critical Heritage” the book series of the Arab Journal, in Riyadh in 2013.
- “The current Moroccan poetry.. from generation to sensitivity” Dar Al-Tawhidi, Rabat in 2014
- “Ali Jaafar Al-Alaq: A Life in the Poem” Kanaan House - Damascus 2015

=== Creative Biography ===
- “My Story with Poetry” (digital version), issued by the Knowledge Upgrading Company in Riyadh, 2013

=== Joint Review Books ===
- “The Biography of the Self... The Biography of the Other”, within the book: The Different Voice.. Ali Jaafar Al-Alaq in his poetic, critical and human experience, prepared and presented by Dr. Ahmed Afifi, House of Spaces, 2012, Amman, p. 335-339.
- “Narrating the Self as Poetry: The Autobiography and the Poetics”, in the book: Autobiography in Contemporary Moroccan Poetry, the works of the seventh academic session of the House of Poetry in Morocco, Dar Al-Manahil, 2014, Rabat, pp.: 131-152.
- “In the Poetics of the Moroccan Diaspora in Europe: I Am Writing and the Demands of Otherness”, in the book: Migration in Contemporary Arabic Literature, under the supervision of Miloud Grafi, Publications of the Faculty of Letters and Human Sciences - University of Mohamed I of Oujda, Series of Seminars and Debates, i.1, 1438 AH-2016 AD, p. : 33-47.
- “The Moroccan Prose Poem: Biblical Awareness and Different Aesthetics”, Presenting the Anthology of the Prose Poem in Morocco: Poems that Light the Road from Morocco to Cairo, The Egyptian General Book Authority, Volume 1, Cairo 2016, pp. 5–21.
- “Reading poetry within cultural and aesthetic tension”, in the book: Benaissa Bouhamala Interpretation of the Eye and the Spirit, supervision and coordination: Abdel Razzaq Haidharani, Dar Al Aman, Rabat, vol. 1, 2017, pp.: 49-55.
- “The Metaphorical Path: From System to Operation”, in the book: Towards a New Interpretive Rhetoric (Research in the Efforts of Moroccan Academic Researcher Mohamed Bazi), Cordoba Press, Agadir, vol. 1, 2019, pp.: 37-57.

== Prizes ==
- The Merit Award from Naji Numan Literary Awards for the year 2007 AD, for his poetry collection: “What Looks Like a Flute on Its Effects.”
- Sharjah Prize in Literary Criticism for the year 2008, for his critical study: “Transformations of Meaning in Arabic Poetry.”
- Prize of the Diwan of Poetry in Berlin for the year 2008, for his poetry collection “Antide”
- The Arabic Poem Award in Morocco for his lengthy text entitled: “Muthanna in the plural form”, in 2016.
