= Gaetuli =

North African people in antiquity

Gaetuli was the Romanised name of an ancient Berber people inhabiting Getulia. The latter district covered the large desert region south of the Atlas Mountains, bordering the Sahara. Other documents place Gaetulia in pre-Roman times along the Mediterranean coasts of what is now Algeria and Tunisia, and north of the Atlas. During the Roman period, according to Pliny the Elder, the Autololes Gaetuli established themselves south of the province of Mauretania Tingitana, in modern-day Morocco. They inhabited the southern slopes of the Aures and Atlas Mountains and probably reached as far as the Atlantic coast. The name of the Godala is hypothesized to be derived from the word Gaetuli.

== Region ==
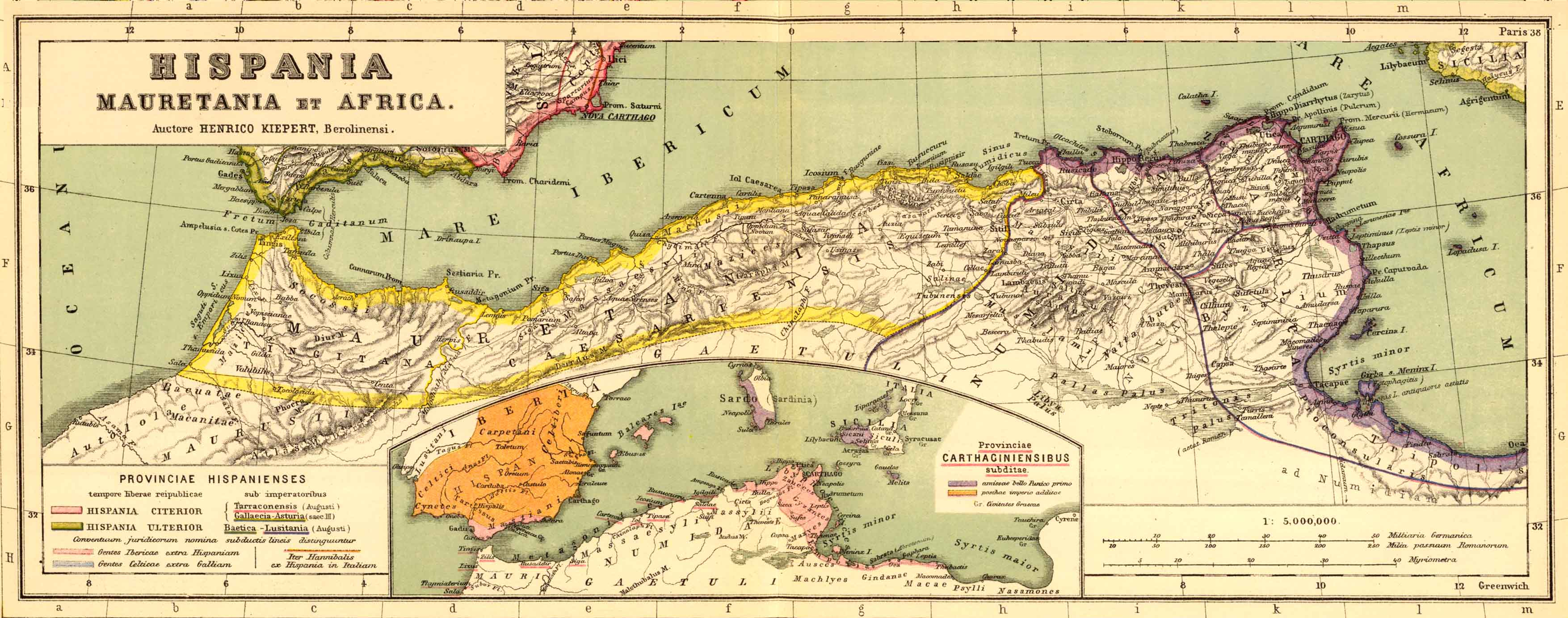
Map locating Getulia south of Mauretania

Getulia was the name given to an ancient district in the Maghreb, which in the usage of Roman writers comprised the nomadic Berber tribes of the southern slopes of the Aures Mountains and Atlas Mountains, as far as the Atlantic, and the oases in the northern part of the Sahara. The Gaetulian people were among the oldest inhabitants in northwestern Africa recorded in classical writings. They mainly occupied the area of modern-day Algeria as far north as Gigthis in the southwestern region of Tunisia and Southern Tripolitania. They were bordered by the Garamantes people to the east and were under the coastal Libyes people. The coastal region of Mauretania was above them, and, although they shared some similar characteristics, were distinct from the Mauri people who inhabited it. The Gaetulians were exposed to the conditions of the harsh interior near the Sahara and produced skillful hardened warriors. They were known for horse rearing, and according to Strabo, they had 100,000 foals in a single year. They were clad in skins, lived on meat and milk, and the manufacture connected with their name is that of the purple dye that became famous from the time of Augustus, and was made from the purple dye murex Bolinus brandaris found on the coast, both in the Syrtes and on the Atlantic.

== Roman perceptions ==
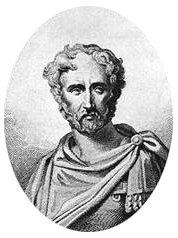
Pliny the Elder

The writings of several ancient Roman histories, most notably Sallust, depict the various indigenous North African tribes as a uniform state and refer to them collectively as the Libyans and Gaetuli. At the beginning of Roman colonization in Mediterranean North Africa, Sallust writes that the Gaetuli were ignarum nominis Romani (Iug. 80.1), ignorant of the Roman name. Sallust also, citing no-longer extant Punic historical documents, written by king Hiempsal, describes the Libyans and Gaetuli as "governed neither by institutions nor law, nor were they subject to anyone’s rule."

Later accounts contradict that description. Pliny the Elder claims that the Gaetuli were essentially different from other indigenous North African Numidian tribes despite sharing the same language. Contemporary historians acknowledge the significant ethnic divisions between the Berber tribes and the existence of individual kings and separate political spheres.

== History ==
Roman records of the Gaetuli first emerge during the Jugurthine War when the group of tribes served as an auxiliary force in Jugurtha’s army against the Romans. This was the first recorded contact between the Romans and the Gaetuli and is the earliest Roman record of the tribes. During the Jugurthine War the Gaetuli attacked and harassed Roman forces and possessed cavalry regiments that provided a significant challenge to the Roman legions. After a truce negotiated between the Numidians and the Romans led to the end of the war, the Gaetuli forces were disbanded.

Gaetulian forces next appear as forces loyal to Gaius Marius during the Bellum Octavianum, a civil war in 87 BC. Possibly in return for land, the Gaetulian forces fought for Marius against Gnaeus Octavius. After almost 90 years of documented peace between the Gaetuli and Rome, the tribes invaded the Roman occupied area in what became known as the "Gaetulian War" in 3 AD. Some historians describe the war more as an uprising that occurred as a result of possible land incursions and Roman mandated control of the movement of the semi-nomadic Gaetuli. In response to the attack, forces led by Cossus Cornelius Lentulus were dispatched to put down the invasion, which they successfully accomplished in 6 A.D. Cossus Cornelius Lentulus was given the surname Gaetulicus for his successful campaign.

In 17 AD the Musulamii tribe, a Gaetulian sub-tribe led by Tacfarinas, fought back against the Romans over the building of a road across Musulamii territory by the Legio III Augusta. This war had begun with sporadic raids and cattle thefts organized by Tacfarinas. These groups were later seen as much more organized. While these groups lacked the significant manpower posed by the Roman army, their ability to conduct sporadic attacks became difficult for Rome to squelch easily. Despite this, there is no evidence to show the Musulamii won any battles against the Roman army. The Musulamii were joined in the conflict against the Romans by the Gaetuli and the neighboring Garamantes. This was the largest war in the Algeria region of Roman Africa in the history of Roman occupation. After the defeat of the Musulamii the Gaetuli ceased to appear in Roman military records. Further records of the Gaetuli indicate that soldiers from the tribes served as auxiliary forces in the Roman army, while the tribes themselves provided the Empire with a range of exotic animals and purple dye, among other goods, through trade. Records indicate that many of the animals used in Roman games were acquired through trade connections with the Gaetuli.

== Culture ==
=== Lifestyle ===
The region of Gaetulia hosted a multitude of climates and thus forced the Gaetulian tribes to adopt several different means of habitation. They are documented living in huts, presumably in the more mountainous, inland portions of Gaetulia and also under the hulls of overturned ships in the coastal regions. The mobility and varying living styles likely contributed to the difficulty of Roman historians to accurately define the Gaetuli in both a political and cultural sense.

Sallust and Pliny the Elder both mention the warlike tendencies of the Gaetuli, which is supported by the frequent accounts of Gaetuli invasions. These accounts appear to demonstrate that the Gaetuli did not discriminate in their targets, as they are recorded to have invaded both Roman territories as well as other Numidian tribes.

The Gaetuli frequently intermarried with other tribes. Apuleius references his semi-Gaetulian, semi-Numidian heritage in his Apologia (c. 170 CE). Sallust also mentions that the Gaetuli intermarried with the Persians and gradually merged with them, becoming nomads.

=== Economy ===
Given their nomadic nature, the Gaetuli were largely self-sufficient. According to Sallust the Gaetuli would feed "on the flesh of wild animals and on the fruits of the earth." Following the Battle of Carthage (c. 149 BC), Roman merchants were able to increase contact with the indigenous Berber tribes and establish trade.

In Deipnosophistae, Athenaeus mentions several desired crops native to the Numidia and Gaetulia regions. The Gaetuli grew and traded asparagus which was "the thickness of a Cyprian reed, and twelve feet long".

Roman colonies in Gaetulia primarily exchanged goods with the Gaetuli for murex, an indigenous shellfish on the Gaetulia coastline (used to create purple dye) and for the exotic fauna native to the region, notably lions, gazelles and tigers. In Horace's Odes, the image of a Gaetulian lion is used to symbolize a great threat. The ferocity and great size of Gaetulian lions contributed to their status as a luxury commodity, and Rome is recorded to have imported many to Italy.

=== Religion ===
In Roman mythology, Iarbas was the son of a North African god, Jupiter Hammon, and a Garamantian nymph. Iarbas became the first king of Gaetuli. In Virgil's Aeneid, Iarbas falls in love with the Carthaginian queen Dido, but is rejected as Dido prefers the suitor Aeneas.

From the period of Late Antiquity until the Islamic conquests, it can be speculated that at least a portion of the Gaetuli converted to Nicene Christianity or heresies thereof, such as Donatism, like other Christian Berber tribes.

== See also ==
- Gaetulian lion

== Bibliography ==
- Cherry, David (1998). Frontier and Society in Roman North Africa. Oxford University Press.
- Fage, J. D., ed. (1979). The Cambridge History of Africa. Vol. 2 (1st ed.). Cambridge: Cambridge University Press.
- Fishwick, Duncan; Shaw, Brent D. (1976). "Ptolemy of Mauretania and the Conspiracy of Gaetulicus". Historia: Zeitschrift für Alte Geschichte. 25 (4): 491–494. JSTOR 4435530.
- Lee, Benjamin Todd; Finkelpearl, Ellen & Graverini, Luca, eds. (2014). Apuleius and Africa. Routledge Press.
- Pliny the Elder (1855). The Natural History. Translated by John Bostock; H.T. Riley. London: Taylor and Francis, Red Lion Court, Fleet Street – via Perseus.
- Sallust (1899). The Jugurthine War. Translated by Rev. John Selby Watson, M.A. New York and London: Harper & Brothers.
