= University of Kairouan =

Public university in Tunisia

Coordinates: 35.676730°N 10.105335°E

- Type: Public
- Established: 2 September 2004
- Affiliations: UNIMED
- Chancellor: Hedi Dhouibi
- Vice-Chancellor: Gandour Mhemmed
- Students: 13862
- Location: Kairouan, Tunisia
- Website: www.univ-k.rnu.tn

The University of Kairouan is a public research university located in Kairouan, Tunisia, and it was founded 2 September 2004.

== Organization ==
The university of Kairouan is formed by 12 higher education institutions, i.e., two research faculties and ten institutes:

=== Faculty of Sciences and Techniques of Sidi Bouzid ===
It was founded on 04 September 2012.

=== Faculty of Arts and Humanities of Kairouan ===
The faculty is a public research faculty located in Kairouan, Tunisia. It was founded on 31 December 1984. The core of the faculty is formed by five academic departments; Arabic, English, French, Philosophy and Archaeology Department.

=== Preparatory Institute for Engineering Studies of Kairouan ===
It was founded on 18 September 2013.

=== Higher Institute of Computer Science and Management of Kairouan ===
It was founded on 9 July 2002.

=== Higher Institute of Arts and Crafts of Kairouan ===
It was founded on 9 July 2002.

=== Higher Institute of Arts and Crafts of Sidi Bouzid ===
It was founded on 8 September 2008, and it is located in Sidi Bouzid.

=== Higher Institute of Applied Studies in Human Sciences of Sbeitla ===
It is a public institute located in Sbeitla. It was founded in 2007. In the academic year 2009–2010, the number of students of the institute reached 1200 students divided in two fields; literature and human sciences.

=== Higher Institute of Juridical and political Studies of Kairouan ===
It was founded on 14 July 2005.

=== Higher Institute of Applied Mathematics and Computer Science of Kairouan ===
It was founded on 6 June 2006.

=== Higher Institute of Applied Sciences and Technology of Kairouan ===
It was founded on 6 June 2006.

=== Higher Institute of Arts and Crafts of Kasserine ===
It was founded on 14 July 2005.

== Notable alumni and academics ==
- Bouraoui Agina, Tunisian author and researcher.
- Ahmed Jdey, Tunisian historian
- Seifeddine Rezgui, alleged perpetrator of the 2015 Sousse attacks.
