= Bacax =

Bacax is a local god from the Roman-North African region. Thought to have been a god of caves, Bacax is known from inscriptions at Cirta (Constantine, Algeria).
