= Ahmed Jdey =

Tunisian author, historian, and professor

- أحمد جدي
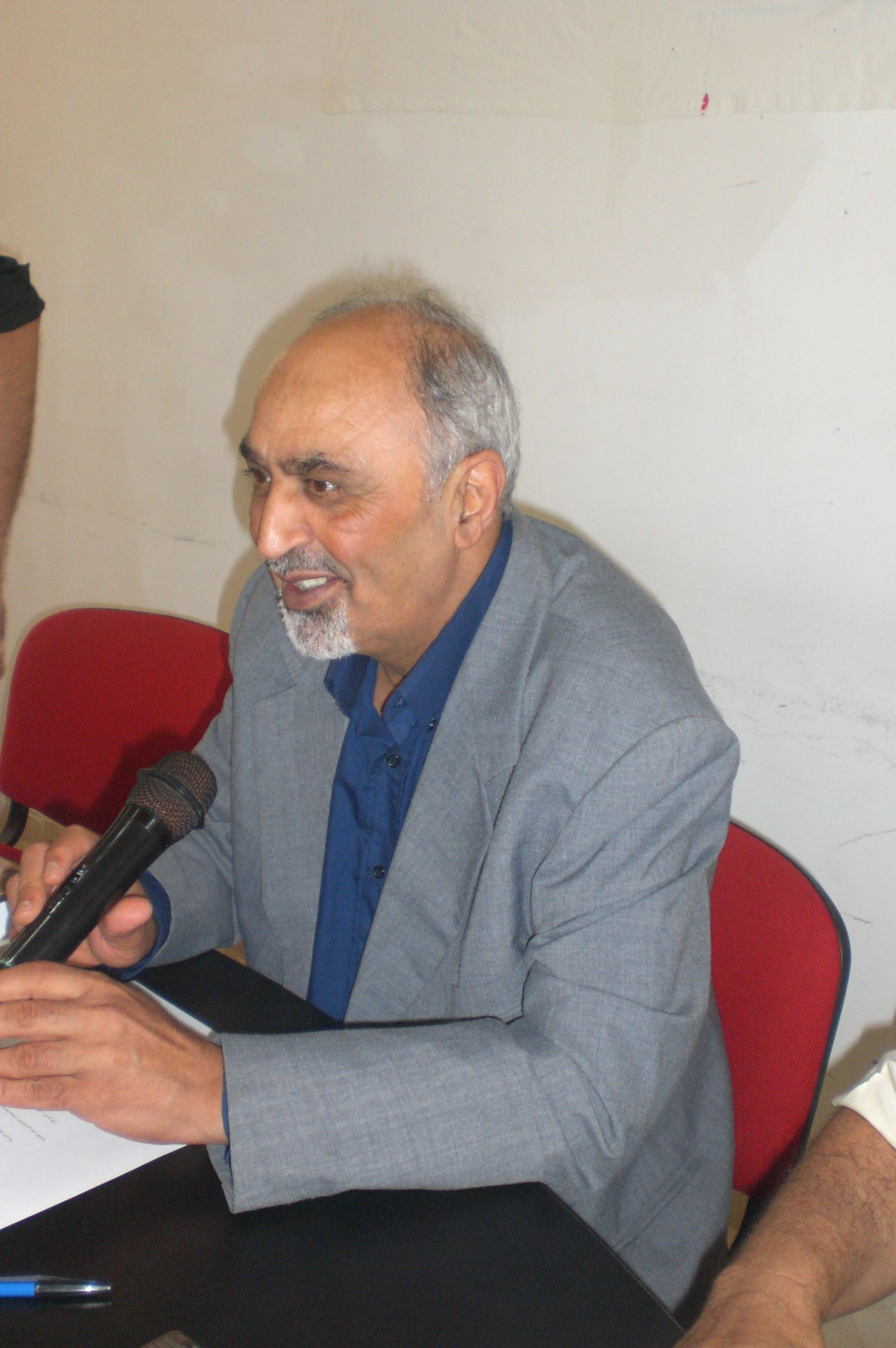
- Born: June 10, 1951 (age 74); Haïdra, Tunisia
- Died: July 20, 2012 (aged 61); Tunis, Tunisia
- Occupations: author, historian, professor
- Website: ahmedjdey.com

Ahmed Jdey (Arabic: أحمد جدي) (Haïdra, June 10, 1951 – July 20, 2012) was a Tunisian author, historian, and professor.

== Early life ==
Jdey was born on June 10, 1951, in Haidra. He finished his secondary studies in Manssoura in Kairouan by obtaining the baccalaureate Literature in 1972. He attended Nice University in France, where he earned a Doctorate degree in history in 1987. His thesis was entitled "ibn Abi Diyaf: his work and thought".

== Career ==
For four years, Jdey served as a member of the faculty of Tunis University, where he taught history. In 1987, he joined the faculty of Nice University.

== Published works ==
- Jdey, Ahmed (1977). Conflict
- Jdey, Ahmed (2000). Memory of the silence
