= Eve MacDonald =

Classicist and archaeologist

Eve MacDonald is a Canadian classicist and archaeologist who specialises in social history. She is a Senior Lecturer in Ancient History at Cardiff University. MacDonald previously worked at the Universities of Edinburgh and Reading. In 2015 she published Hannibal: A Hellenistic Life with Yale University Press.

== Education ==
MacDonald completed a degree in classics at the University of Alberta. For post-graduate study, MacDonald completed a Master of Arts at UCL Institute of Archaeology and then a Doctor of Philosophy at the University of Ottawa.

== Career ==
MacDonald worked as a teaching fellow at the University of Edinburgh between 2007 and 2011, and then the University of Reading from 2012 to 2017. While at the University of Reading, MacDonald published a biography of Hannibal, Hannibal: A Hellenistic Life with Yale University Press. The book presented Hannibal as part of Hellenistic culture. In a review published in The Classical Review, John R. Holton described MacDonald's book as "an excellent achievement, arguably the best of its kind to date". Writing in The Heythrop Journal, Patrick Madigan echoed these sentiments, calling it "the most complete life of Hannibal to date". MacDonald's expertise on Hannibal led her to appear in documentaries on Hannibal for PBS and Channel 4.

MacDonald joined Cardiff University in 2017 where she is a lecturer in ancient history.

== Selected publications ==
- MacDonald, Eve (2015). Hannibal: a Hellenistic Life. New Haven: Yale University Press. ISBN 978-0-300-21015-6.
- MacDonald, Eve; Bingham, Sandra (2019). "Piracy, plunder and the legacy of archaeological research in North Africa". In Evans, Richard; De Marre, Martine (eds.). Piracy, Pillage and Plunder in Antiquity: Appropriation and the Ancient World. Routledge Monographs in Classical Studies. Routledge. pp. 170–184. doi:10.4324/9780429440441-11. ISBN 978-0-429-44044-1. S2CID 211644374.
- MacDonald, Eve; Short, Ewen (2021), "Shirin in context: female agency and the wife of Sasanian King Khosrow Parvez", in Droß-Krüpe, Kerstin; Fink, Sebastian (eds.), Powerful Women in the Ancient World: Perception and (Self) Presentation, vol. 4, Zaphon, pp. 475–498, ISBN 9783963271380, ISSN 2698-8224
- MacDonald, Eve (2022), "The best of men: cross-cultural command in the 630s AD", in Tougher, Shaun; Evans, Richard (eds.), Generalship in Ancient Greece, Rome and Byzantium, Edinburgh: Edinburgh University Press, pp. 206–224, ISBN 9781474459945
- Priestman, Seth; al-Jahwari, Nasser; MacDonald, Eve; Kennet, Derek (2023), "Anglo-Omani excavations at Fulayj fort", The British Omani Society Review 2023, The British Omani Society, pp. 95–98
- MacDonald, Eve (2025). Carthage: A New History of an Ancient Empire. London: Ebury Publishing. ISBN 978-1-529-91170-1.
- Bingham, Sandra; MacDonald, Eve (2024). Carthage. London: Bloomsbury Academic. p. 168. ISBN 9781472529299.
