= Legio III Augusta =

Roman legion

- Map of the Roman Empire in CE 125, under emperor Hadrian, showing the Legio III Augusta, stationed at Lambaesis (Batna, Algeria), in Africa Proconsularis province, from CE 75 until the 4th century
- Country: Roman Republic and Roman Empire
- Type: Roman legion (Marian)
- Role: Infantry assault
- Size: 5000–6000
- Garrison/HQ: Lambaesis (128 – early 4th century)
- Engagements: Wars of the Second Triumvirate (43–42 BC); The Rebellion of Tacfarinas (14 BC–24 AD)

Commanders
- Notable commanders: Maximinus Thrax

Shield pattern of Tertio Augustani, Legio III Augusta, early 5th century

Legio III Augusta ("Third Augustan Legion") was a legion of the Imperial Roman army. Its origin may have been the Republican 3rd Legion which served the general Pompey during his civil war against Gaius Julius Caesar (49–45 BC). It supported the general Octavian (later emperor Augustus) in his civil war against Mark Antony (31–30 BC). It was officially refounded in 30 BC, when Octavian achieved sole mastery of the Roman Empire. In that year, it was deployed in the Roman province of Africa, where it remained until at least the late 4th century AD.

== History and troop movements ==
The Legio III Augusta was placed in Africa to ensure a steady grain supply to Rome. Under Augustus, the African Proconsul had command over it and several other legions. By the end of Tiberius's reign, it was the only legion in Africa. Under Caligula, command of the army was withdrawn from the proconsul and given to a Propraetorial legate who answered directly to the emperor. The Legio III Augusta first set up camp at Haidra before 14. The base at Haidra was not large enough to support an entire legion; this suggests that the legion was split up. Desert warfare required a small and highly mobile fighting force and it was not unheard of for the emperor to split a legion into several vexillations and place them at separate fortresses. For the most part, whole legions were not moved into Africa but rather, small vexillations were formed from the armies of Germany and Pannonia and sent to help when needed.

The Roman military presence in North Africa was not always accepted or welcomed. Most notably in opposition to the Roman institution was Tacfarinas, a former Roman soldier turned Musulamii guerrilla leader. Tacfarinas is an example of the multiple rebellions against the expansion of the Roman Empire through military establishment and geographical positioning as well as the adequate and tactful response by the Third Augustan Legion.

The Berber tribes attacked the Augustan Legion when they were particularly vulnerable. It is reported that the first attacks were in 14 AD when the Legion had just completed its first road building project. The timing suggests that the Third Augustan Legion had not yet established its roots or an approving reputation. This first revolt was swiftly put down.

However, just three years later Tacfarinas started his attacks against the Romans. The guerrilla warfare tactics combined with Tacfarinas' novel approach to attack from the rear, created additional difficulties for the Third Augustan Legion in their efforts to defeat Tacfarinas. The manner in which Tacfarinas led his rebellions was of particular concern to the Third Augustan Legion. At first, Tacfarinas did not appear to be a great threat; his initial band of fighters was composed mainly of robbers and rebels. However, Tacfarinas' band of robbers soon gained the expertise and precision of the Roman Army. Tacfarinas traveled through North Africa collecting Roman soldiers left behind by the Third Augustan Legion; Tacitus describes this process as a "cherry picking " of sorts, using soldiers who had already been trained by the Roman army and using their skills against their creator. Tacfarinas created a new coalition from the collected Roman soldiers and North African citizens looking to rebel against the expansion of the Roman Empire into the Musulamii people, under his sole command.

With the traditional tactics used by the Roman army, the enemy was expected to attack in formation, as the Roman legions did. With the rebellion of Tacfarinas, Roman commanders had to change their mode of attack. The general of the Third Augustan Legion split up the army into small units of men that took orders from a commanding officer. These units of men were constantly battle ready, mobile, and trained to fight in the desert, anticipating attacks from Tacfarinas and his rebels. With this change in traditional tactics, Tacfarinas was defeated in a matter of years.

Tacfarinas' army was ultimately defeated and Tacfarinas himself committed suicide, however his revolts and rebellious efforts should not go unnoticed. The Third Augustan Legion had to master the revolutionary techniques of Tacfarinas' band of robbers and ex-soldiers to succeed in conquering Tacfarinas. The guerrilla warfare strategies that Tacfarinas displays are one of the many ways the Third Augustan Legion had to alter its defense techniques in order to settle rebels throughout North Africa. The Musulamii gang under leadership and control of Tacfarinas was just one example of rebellions that the Legion had to settle, however no army of rebels proved as difficult, incessant, or resilient as the guerrilla army under Tacfarinas.

The Third Augustan Legion was responsible for multiple building projects and the enforced the presence of the Roman Empire against rebellions in North Africa for over three hundred years. However, they influenced the frontier in ways other than through expansion and urbanization. Militarily, they reformed the structure of the frontier through cultural changes and their mere presence throughout Africa.

However, the legion was self-sufficient in protecting the African provinces for the majority of the time. Most threats that required reinforcements arose in Mauretania, as this was where the Moors were the most dangerous. The Third Augustan had around 5000–6000 men with about 10,000–15,000 auxiliary men stationed close by. Almost half of these soldiers were stationed in Mauretania Tingitana; the rest were positioned based on the military needs of that time. The Emperor Vespasian reunited the legion in a single fortress at Theveste, most likely in 75. In 115 or 120, the Legio III Augusta established their camp at Lambaesis where it remained for two centuries apart from the period 238–253.

The legion was disbanded in 238 AD "because of its role in putting down an African-based revolt against the emperor Maximinus in favor of the provincial governor Gordianus." Capelianus was a legate in the legion and the officer who (mis)used his legion to attack Gordian. For this reason, Gordian III disbanded the legion.

In 252, Valerian reformed the legion to deal with the "five people groups", a dangerous coalition of Berber tribes. The legion prevailed in 260 but the threat remained, and fortifications of Lambaesis were expanded over the following years. In 289, the struggle began again and the emperor Maximianus took personal control of the legion. The war lasted until 297 at which point the legion was victorious.

In the early 4th century, Diocletian personally put down a rebellious governor and immediately afterward, transferred the Legio III Augusta from Lambaesis to another, unknown base within the region. Diocletian often worked with the legion during the period of military anarchy from 235 to 284. He was particularly prolific with his building projects, many of which were in Africa. Most of the projects were aimed at either replacing earlier works destroyed during the period of military anarchy or repairing public improvements, which had been allowed to fall into decay. The Legion was the main labor resource for these projects. The legion was still mentioned as late as the early 5th century but the actual date of its final disbandment is unknown.

== Urbanization ==
The Third Augustan Legion was not only a source of protection for the Roman Empire, but also largely responsible for the urbanization of the North African provinces. The Legion was initially stationed in Ammaedara (modern-day Haïdra) where they built their first military camp. From there. the legionaries invested part of their time in the construction of roads, bringing with it the expansion of the empire.

These new connections led to the development of new towns and cities for civilians, camps for the military and even colonies for the veterans. All three were usually distinct from each other, but as time progressed, civilian towns, military camps and veterants colonies tended to merge.

The Legion did not always build up an entire town. Often, civilians assisted in part of the building projects. The most common construction projects soldiers were requested to work on were aqueducts, fortifications and amphitheaters. Typically they were more involved with "monumental projects" rather than "pure architecture." The legion was therefore no solely a military force but also a corps of engineers and surveyors, which required an advanced mix of skills.

=== Roads ===
The first instance of military roads built by the Legio III Augusta happened in 14 AD: It connected their base in Ammaedara, through Thelepte, all the way to the Oasis of Gafsa. Further expansion occurred under the rule of Tiberius with a road from the Oasis of Gafsa to the Oasis of Gabes. Between these two cities, the Legion stopped for rest and created five stations.

The Legion sometimes followed the previously existing paved road or hard-packed dirt tracks between Punic or Berber towns, but they mainly created new roads. Their construction followed a distinct system. Since these roads were commonly built for the use of military movement, they needed to be kept as straight (for speed of movement) and as safe as possible (Therefore where possible built on higher ground, avoiding valleys). Due to the higher location, some roads were even built with a system to drain water. Calculations estimate that the total length of roads in North Africa during Roman rule reached about 19,300 kilometres.

Other important roads for the Legio III Augusta included the one linking Tebessa to the port of Hippo Regius. Its construction was imperative for more efficient delivery of supplies to the Legion and town. Another was the road from Tébessa (Tebessa) to Carthage; both roads were built during Vespasian's reign.

Finally, a road built under Trajan ran south across the mountains of the Gulf of Syrte. The strategic importance of the road is indicated by the number of forts built along it.

Some Emperors really encouraged building of roads. One in particular was Hadrian. He was deeply involved with the work of the Legio III Augusta and sought to make sure they were involved in building projects. the advantages of building roads was not restricted to military matters but provided economic incentives positive for the empire: For example, the long roads built in Leptis Magna helped open up the interior lands. Farmers seized this opportunity to plant more olive groves and therefore more oil was able to be exported to Rome.

Once towns began to take in close proximity to military camps, marks of separation were needed. Typically, arches were used to mark on roads (or above them) the distinction between the civilian area and the entrance into the Roman military camp. The Via Septimiana—a road built under the reign of Septimius Severus in the town of Lambaesis - illustrates this with the presence of a Triple Arch, marking the boundary where the Third Augustan Legion was within its military zone.

=== Aqueducts ===
The members of the Third Augustan Legion did not solely consist of military men. The Emperors made an effort to recruit some men that were experts in surveying and the mathematics of construction. There is good evidence of this from emperors Augustus, Hadrian and Trajan, who all held engineers responsible for both construction and the military. There were not always many of these talented men in Northern Africa so it was important to train other men for the job. Thus over time the army became a place to learn the technical skills of engineering and surveying. These men would become involved in the construction of the big duties like canals or aqueducts.

The construction of aqueducts was not an easy job. It was very difficult to make sure all the pipes were level and that the pressure was correct at both ends. The surveyor was responsible for calculating all these measurements beforehand and then leaving the directions with the procurator. They would most likely be handed off to an officer known as the mensor, whose position was comparable to that of a contractor, and he was in charge of overseeing the production. His main purpose was to assist in the layout of Roman camps and towns, and he directed the use of measuring instruments. One of the most commonly used devices was a groma which helped with the measurement of right angles.

However, the mensor and the legionaries were not always experts so the accuracy of the groma only helped to a certain extent. When this happened, surveyors had to be recalled for recalculations. There is a well-preserved inscription depicting this situation in Africa. The surveyor, Nonius Datus, wrote about his encounters with the Third Augustan Legion and how he had carefully surveyed, taken the measures of all the mountains and mapped out the axis for which the tunnel would need to be excavated. This he gave to the procurator. He even gave the information to the contractor to be sure everything was done correctly. As Datus' skills were so widely needed, he had to leave the Legion for four years expecting the construction would go along smoothly without him. The construction did not go according to plan. The legionaries were unable to dig the tunnels at the right measurement causing them to be completely off the intended line. It was up to Datus to fix the situation.

The surveyors knew how to properly construct these aqueducts. If they stayed to monitor the actual construction, the operation ran successfully. This can be witnessed by the vast number of aqueducts that stood hundreds of years, some of them even thousands. For example, the water springs from Jebel Zaghouan still bring water all the way to Tunis. Historian E. Lennox Manton says, "A large new pipeline takes it through those same conduits in the hills which were originally excavated by the legion." Although the pipping system was changed, the original layout is still used.

=== The Third Augustan Legion's camp bases ===
Augustus officially stationed his Third Legion in 30 BC at Ammaedara which was located in the Aures Mountains. There they protected the North African provinces for 105 years. Not much remains today, at the exception of ruins of theaters and churches that are quite recognizable. A large military cemetery has been found, most of the tombs being from legionaries. During their time stationed at Ammaedara, the Legion discovered the town of Sbeitla. Many soldiers were recruited from this town. Then in 75 AD the Legion's camp was moved to Theveste (present day Tebessa). However, many of the veterans stayed behind and were able to settle in town, several becoming farmers.

The move to Theveste in 75 AD was not very far—just a bit west of Ammaedara. They relocated for purely strategic reasons. It was believed that if they moved they would be closer to the enemy—the local tribes who had been uprising often. The Legion was dedicated to its protection so they wanted to make sure they were in the best place possible to do so. They settled the area and built their own town. This town was physically constructed according to the principle of Hippodamus, the grid layout. The few remains in modern time include just a few pieces of architecture: the arch to Caracalla, a temple to Minerva and ruins of an amphitheater. On the arch "medallions of Septimius Severus and Julia Domna still survive on its faces" and the temple is "…one of the three or four best-preserved temples of the Roman world," says John Ferguson, archaeologist, who explored the area. It is uncertain whether or not the Legion participated in the construction of these buildings, but it is clear that they were once in the town of their home base.

The Legion was moved a third and final time to station at Lambaesis in 128 AD. Once again this move was for strategic reasons as it was located in the Aures Mountains. This placement was the optimal location for control over the tribes. Originally they built their camp to be about 220 square yards following the same grid plan as they did at Theveste. As historian E. Lennox Manton describes the construction, he says it was built "to a rectangular plan with military precision." By the middle of the 2nd century, the town grew perhaps to four times its original size.

Throughout their stay at Lambaesis, columns, pillars with rounded niches and statues were all built around the town. They even paved a courtyard that was surrounded by porticos with rooms on three sides. Some of these rooms were just for the military guards and the Commander-in-chief. The fourth side consisted of a basilica. Probably one of the most "impressive" and "the most dominant memorials of Roman military might" was the praetorium built in Lambaesis. This praetorium served as the house of the commander — most likely the procurator. They also had baths and an amphitheater outside the camp. After some time civilians began to settle close by, but their area was marked off by an arch.

=== Veteran towns ===
One veteran town from the Third Augustan Legion (and actually other legions in the Empire) was Thuburbo Majus. Here colonies were arranged granting veterans with, at the most, ¾ an acre of land. Although they were considered retired, these veterans were still involved in the protection of the provinces. Therefore, their colonies were spread out according to the Legion's strategic plan, and members actually guarded the areas. They sometimes built towers or ditches to be even more secure. Regardless of the militaristic constructions in the town, there were still public buildings such as a forum, mosaic floors, baths, churches and temples.

Another town founded by Nerva especially for veterans was Cuicul (now Djémila), "the beautiful" in the 1st century. The Legion also helped protect this town just as in Thuburbo Majus. The town is located on a hill and the lower part was the original foundation. It was later extended up the hill as more and more commercial activity occurred. Originally, at the end of the 1st century, there was a forum built. This later became known as the North Forum because another was built in the 3rd century. The second forum included a temple to Septimius Severus. The staircase in the temple was wonderful, "…the most impressive flight of steps ever to be built to such an edifice in North Africa." There was a paved road that connected the two forums and upon walking, temples, buildings, homes and even the old market area could be seen. The wealthier veterans were able to construct baths and mosaics around the town. This made the area even more beauteous.

Thamugadi, or modern Timgad, was a town founded for the sole purpose of resettling veterans. Original inhabitants were given a small plot of land inside the city to build on and a small plot of land outside the city to farm. The city grew rapidly, fueled by the security provided by the nearby army camp and the economic prosperity of the mid-2nd century. Over the following generations, crops were sold to Rome and the economic status of the cities inhabitants shifted; some became wealthy while others remained in comparative poverty. The wealthy were not only able to build better homes for themselves, but also contributed to the town of Timgad by donating money for public monuments. The presence of a library within the town signifies a high standard of learning and indicates a high level of prosperity within this veteran settlement. Life after the military was apparently not as harsh as life in the military. The town's paved streets can still be walked on today, and it is possible to see the numerous public buildings as well. A library, a large theater (seating between 4000–5000 people) and most notably an amazing forum are all still standing. Trajan's arch is also visible. This was built to replace the Lambaesis Gate—a monument built on the street that led to Lambeasis. The town itself was most likely a very clean place. There are many baths throughout, probably close to 12–14.

== Lifestyle and culture ==
=== Composition of the legion ===
Originally, the Legion was composed mainly of Italian soldiers, but by the 3rd century AD the legion was almost entirely of Punic and Libyan origin. Italy and Gaul were hard-pressed to cope with the demand for troops during the 2nd century. As a result, the African Legions had to get manpower from eastern and local sources.

=== Daily life ===
The Legio III Augusta built the thirty-nine kilometers of the Lambaesis aqueduct in eight months, and the Legion or its temporary successor kept the roads in repair throughout the period of military anarchy. The Legion built and fortified Lambaesis and a military colony at Thamugadi, which was settled largely by veterans of the legion.

=== Marriage of soldiers ===
As was the case throughout the empire, soldiers of the Third Augustan Legion were forbidden to marry. A mobile army might have been in state of forced celibacy but this was not possible or practical for soldiers in fixed frontier posts. Inscriptions from Lambaesis often mention women companions of soldiers, which indicate that although they did not marry during active duty, they did form relationships with local women.

== See also ==
- List of Roman legions
