= Haïdra =

Haïdra حيدرة
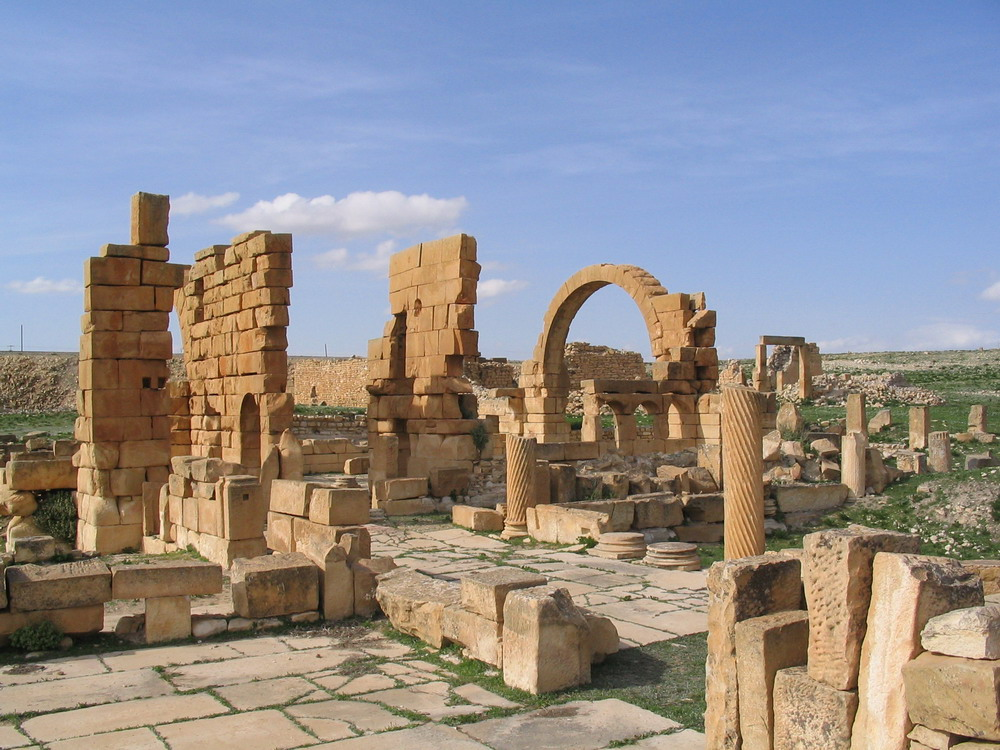
- Archaeology site of Haidra

- Location in Tunisia
- Coordinates: 35°34′N 8°28′E
- Country: Tunisia
- Governorate: Kasserine Governorate

Government
  - Mayor: Kamel Boudhiafi (Nidaa Tounes)
- Elevation: 2,760 ft (840 m)

Population (2014)
  - Total: 3,451
- Time zone: UTC1 (CET)
- Postal code: 1221

Haïdra (Arabic: حيدرة) is a municipality in western Tunisia, containing the ruins of Ammaedara, one of the oldest Roman cities in Africa. It was a diocese and is now a Roman Catholic titular see.

== History ==
Ammaedara was on the border between the valleys and the Berber tribes and was part of the Roman province of Byzacena.

The Third Augustan Legion (Legio III Augusta) was installed in Ammaedara in 30 BC where they built their first fortress. From here the legion was partly responsible for the urbanisation of the North African provinces, building roads and other infrastructure. Its ruins include mausoleums, Byzantine fortresses, underground baths and a church.

Archaeological excavations at the site have also uncovered several mosaic pavements, including the Mosaic of the islands and cities of the Mediterranean, a Late Roman work now held in the Bardo National Museum in Tunis.

== Ecclesiastical history ==
Excavation of what has been called the Church of Melleus in the centre of Ammaedara has brought to light the tombs of some bishops of the see. In addition, documentary records survive of Eugenius, a bishop of Ammaedara, who participated in the Council of Carthage (255), which discussed the question of the lapsi, and of Speratus and Crescentianus, representing respectively the Catholics and the Donatists of the city, who took part in the Council of Carthage (411) of 411. Later Catholic bishops were Hyacinthus and Melleus, both of the second half of the 6th century.

Given the Roman province, it must have been a suffragan of the Metropolitan archbishop of its capital Hadrumetum (modern Sousse, also in Tunisia).

=== Titular see ===
No longer a residential bishopric, Ammaedara is today listed by the Catholic Church as a titular see. The diocese was nominally restored as Ammædæra of Ammædera and renamed Ammædara in 1925.

It has had the following incumbents, all of the lowest (episcopal) rank :

- Mathieu Sislian (3 December 1909 – 30 August 1915)
- Joseph Raphael John Crimont, Jesuits (S.J.) (15 February 1917 – 20 May 1945)
- Joseph Gerald Holland, Society of African Missions (S.M.A.) (11 July 1946 – 18 April 1950)
- Jacob Abraham Theophilos Kalapurakal (25 July 1950 – 27 June 1956)
- Joseph-Rolland-Gustave Prévost-Godard (趙玉明), Société des Missions-Étrangères du Québec (Society of Foreign Missions; P.M.E.) (11 November 1956 – 13 November 2005)
- Pierre Nguyễn Văn Đệ, Salesians (S.D.B.) (29 November 2005 – 25 July 2009)
- Vincent Nguyen (Nguyễn Mạnh Hiếu) (6 November 2009 – present), Auxiliary Bishop of Toronto (Canada)

== Notable people ==
- Ahmed Jdey (10 June 1951 – 20 July 2012), author, historian and professor.

== Population ==
2014 Census (Municipal)
Homes	Families	Males	Females	Total
1080	929	1668	1783	3451

== Source and external links ==
- GigaCatholic with titular incumbents biography links
