= Chronological list of saints in the 3rd century =

A list of people, who died during the 3rd century, who have received recognition as Saints (through canonization) from the Catholic Church:

Name	Birth	Birthplace	Death	Place of death	Notes
Persecution under Septimus Severus (202–210) begins
Abaskhiron the Soldier		Qallin, Egypt		Asyut, Egypt	
Irenaeus	130	Smyrna	202	Lugdunum	Bishop of Lyons
Leonides of Alexandria			202	Alexandria, Egypt;	father of Origen
Plutarch, Potamiaena, and Companions			202	Alexandria, Egypt	
Charalampias	89	Magnesia, Greece	203	Antioch, Pisidia	
Gundenis			203	Carthage, Africa Province	
Perpetua and Felicity			203	Carthage, Africa Province	
Zoticus of Comana			204		Bishop of Comana
Abdon and Sennen			205		
Basilides and Potamiana			205	Alexandria, Egypt	
Andeolus		Smyrna	208	Viviers, Gaul	
Serapion of Antioch			211		Patriarch of Antioch
Felix, Fortunatus, and Achilleus			212	Valence, Gaul	introduced Christianity to Valence, Drôme
Ferreolus and Ferrutio			212		
Mavilus of Adrumetum			212	Adrumetum, Africa Province	killed by wild beasts
Narcissus of Jerusalem	100		212	Aelia Capitolina Syria Palaestina	Patriarch of Jerusalem
Urciscenus			216		Bishop of Pavia (183-216)
Asclepiades of Antioch			217		Patriarch of Antioch (211-217)
Clement of Alexandria	150	Athens, Greece	217		
Zephyrinus		Rome, Roman Empire	217	Rome, Roman Empire	Pope
Theodore, Philippa, and Companions			220	Pamphylia	
Callixtus I (Callistus)			222	Todi, Roman Empire	Pope
Asterius of Ostia			223	Ostia, Roman Empire	
Martina of Rome			228	Rome, Roman Empire	
Cecilia		Rome, Roman Empire	230	Sicily, Roman Empire	
Tatiana of Rome		Rome, Roman Empire	230	Rome, Roman Empire	
Thespesius			230	Cappadocia	
Urban I		Rome, Roman Empire	230	Rome, Roman Empire	Pope
Demetrius of Alexandria		Alexandria, Roman Empire	231		Pope of Alexandria
Calepodius			232		
Persecution under Maximinus Thrax (235-238) begins
Andrew of Trier			235		Bishop of Trier
Barbara		Nicomedia, Roman Empire	235	Nicomedia, Roman Empire	
Florentius and Felix			235	Furcona, Roman Empire	
Pontian			235	Sardinia, Roman Empire	Pope
Quiriacus			235		Bishop of Ostia
Anterus			236	Rome, Roman Empire	Pope
Hippolytus	170	Rome, Roman Empire	236	Sardinia, Roman Empire	
Orentius and Patientia		Osca, Hispania	240	Aragon, Hispania	
Heraclas			247		Patriarch of Alexandria
Apollonia			249	Alexandria, Egypt	
Cointha (Quinta)			249	Alexandria, Egypt	
Cyriaca (Dominica)	Rome, Roman Empire		249		
Monas			249		Bishop of Milan
Persecution under Decius (250-251) begins
Agabius			250		Bishop of Verona
Alexander of Fermo			250		Bishop of Fermo
Alexander			250		
Ammonaria (two women with the same name)			250		
Babylas of Antioch			250		Patriarch of Antioch
Barsimaeus			250		Bishop of Edessa
Bassus			250		Bishop of Nice
Cassian of Imola			250		
Castus and Emilius			250		
Christopher			250		
Cyril of Caesarea			250		
Denis, Rusticus and Eleutherius			250		
Epicharis			250		
Epimachus			250		
Fabian			250		Pope
Faustus, Abibus and Dionysius of Alexandria			250		
Felinus and Gratian			250		
Florentius			250		
Fusca and Marura			250		
Germanus			250		
Heliconis			250		
Heron			250		
Lucian and Marcian			250		
Macarius of Alexandria			250		
Macarius of Libya			250		
Maximus of Aquila			250		
Maximus of Nola			250		Bishop of Nola
Maximus of Ephesus			250		
Mercurius			250		
Metranus (Metras)			250		
Minias (Miniato)			250		
Moses (Moysetes)			250		
Moseus and Ammonius			250		
Myron			250		Bishop of Crete
Nemesion			250		
Papias			250		
Paramon and Companions			250		
Parasceva			250		
Parmenius			250		
Pionius			250		
Saturninus of Rome			250		
Saturninus (Sernin)			250		Bishop of Toulouse
Saturninus, Thrysus, and Victor			250		
Secundian			250		
Secundina			250		
Ten Martyrs of Crete			250		
The Seven Sleepers of Ephesus			250		
Troadius			250		
Venatius of Camerino			250		
Vissa			250		
Agatha			251		
Agatho			251		
Alexander			251		Bishop of Jerusalem
Alphius			251		
Caerealis and Sallustia			251		
Callinica and Basilissa			251		
Conon the Gardener			251		martyr
Galation (Galacteon) and Episteme			251		
Maximus and Olympiades (Olympias)			251		
Maximus			251		
Menignus			251		
Moses			251		
Myrope			251		
Nestor			251		Bishop of Magydos
Pergentinus and Laurentinus			251		
Peter of Lampsacus, Andrew, Paul, and Denise (Dionysia)			251		
Quintus, Simplicius, and companions			251		
Thyrsus, Leucius, and Callinicus			251		
Trypho (Tryphon)			251		
Serapion			252		
Cornelius			253		Pope
Victoria of Tivoli			253		
Felician	160		254		
Lucius I			254		Pope
Messalina of Foligno			254		
Martyrs of Saragossa			254	Zaragoza	
Maximus			255		
Paternus			255		
Restituta			255		
Tarsicius			255		
Venantius			255		Bishop of Dalmatia
Rogatian			256		
Persecution under Valerian (257-259) begins
Anastasia II and Cyril			257		
Athanasius			257		Bishop of Tarsus
Basilla of Rome		Rome	257	Rome	
Dionysius, Faustus, Gaius, Peter, Paul and companions			257		
Eugenia			257		
Protus and Hyacinthus			257		
Quadratus of Herbipolis			257		
Rufina and Secunda			257		
Stephen I			257		Pope
Tertullinus			257		
Agapitus			258		
Codratus of Corinth, Dionysius, Cyprian, Anectus, Paul, and Crescens			258		
Crescentian			258		
Curomotus			258		Bishop of Iconium
Cyprian			258		Bishop of Carthage
Jovinus and Basileus			258		
Lawrence of Rome	225		258		
Romanus Ostiarius			258		
Sixtus II, Pope and martyr, and Companions			258		
Twelve Holy Brothers			258		
Saint Agapius of Spain			259		
Candidus			259		
Digna and Emerita			259		
Fructuosus, Augurius and Eulogius			259		
Justin			259		
Marian, James, and companions			259		
Montanus, Flavian, Julian, Lucius, Victoricus, and 5 Companions			259		
Patroclus			259		
Polyeuctus			259		
Pontian			259		
Alexander, Malchus and Priscus			260		
Felix of Nola			260		
Leo and Paregorius			260		
Lucilla, Antoninus, Eugene, Flora, Theodore, Aucejas, and 18 Companions			260		
Martyrs of Utica			260		
Peter, Julian, and Companions			260		
Priscus, Malchus, and Alexander			260		
Regulus (Rieul, Rule)			260		Bishop of Civitas Silvanectium
Martyrs of Alexandria			261		
Peregrine			261		Bishop of Auxerre
Agrippina			262		
Asterius			262	Caesarea Palaestina	
Marinus, Roman soldier and martyr,			262	Caesarea Palaestina	
Heraclius and Zosimus			263		
Cassius			264		
Antholian (Anatolianus)			265		
Antidius (Tude)			265		Bishop of Besançon
Dionysius			265		Patriarch of Antioch
Dionysius			268		Pope
Zama			268		Bishop of Bologna
Athenodorus			269		
Theodosius			269		
Valentine			269		
Persecution under Aurelian (270-275) begins
Aurea			270		
Gregory Thaumaturgus (the wonderworker)			270		Bishop of Neocaesarea
Heliodorus			270		
Hermes			270		
Honestus			270		
Martha			270		
Paul and Juliana			270		
Philip			270		Bishop of Fermo
Prisca			270		
Theodotus			270		
Restituta of Sora			271		
Agapitus			272		
Julia of Troyes			272		
Priscus (Prix) and Companions			272		
Reverianus			272		
Sabas (the Goth)			272		
Agpae (Agape)			273		
Lucillian, Paula, Claudius, Dionysius, Hypatius, and Paul			273		
Saturninus, Castulus, Magnus, and Lucius			273		
Anastasius Cornicularius			274		
Columba of Sens			274		
Felix I			274		Pope
Alexander the Charcoal-Burner			275		Bishop of Comana
Basilides and 22 Companions			275		
Conon and Conon			275		
Mamas			275		
Philomenus			275		
Trophimus			280		Bishop of Arles
Maximus			282		
Anatolius			283		Bishop of Laodicea in Syria
Cosmas and Damian			283		
Diodorus and Marianus			283		
Justus and Abundius			283		
Pelagius			283		
Ariston			284		
Chrysanthus and Daria			284		
Claudius			284		
Hilarius of Aquileia (Hilary of Panonia)			284		Bishop of Aquileia, Italy. Beheaded in the persecutions of Numerian
Maximilian			284		Bishop of Lorch
Thalelaeus			284		
Theopemptus (Theopompus), Bishop of Nicomedia and martyr, and Theonas			284		
Victorinus and Companions			284		
Castulus			286		
Crispin and Crispian			286		
Marcus and Marcellianus (Mark and Marcellian), deacons			286		
Piatus (Piat or Piaton)			286		
Regina (Reine)			286		
Tranquillinus			286		
Ursus			286		
Victor of Xanten			286		
Zoe			286		
Alban			287		
Boniface of Tarsus			287		
Crescentian			287		
Faith (Foy, Fides)			287		
Maurice and Companions			287		
Maxentius			287		
Palmatius			287		
Quentin (Quintinius)			287		
Sabinus			287		
Valerius and Rufinus			287		
Victoricus, Fuscian, and Gentian			287		
Sebastian	257		288		
Donatian and Rogatian			289		
Apollinaris			290		
Firmus and Rusticus			290		
Hermes and Adrian			290		
Justin			290		
Lucian of Beauvais			290		
Paul			290		Bishop of Narbonne
Pompeius			290		Bishop of Pavia
Rhipsime, Gaiana, and Companions			290		
Serena			290		
Victor of Marseilles			290		
Vincent of Agen			292		
Aquilina			293		
Archelais, Thecla, and Susanna			293		
Carpophorus			295		
Domnio			295		
Maximilian of Tebessa	273		295		
Maximus, Alexander, Claudius, Cutias, and Praepedigna			295		
Meletius			295		Bishop of Pontus
Rufus and Carpophorus			295		
Tiburtius and Susanna			295		
Urpasian			295		
Felix and Fortunatus			296		
Gabinus			296		
Pope Caius			296		Pope
Octavius			297		
Primus and Felician			297		
Romanus of Samosata			297	Samosata, Syria	
Ananias III			298		
Cassian			298		
Marcellus the Centurion			298		
Timothy and Maura (Martha)			298		
Restitutus			299		
Agileus			300		
Agrippinus			300		Bishop of Naples
Alexandra, Claudia, Euphrasia, Matrona, Juliana, Euphemia, Theodosia, Derphuta and her sister			300		
Amandus, Alexander, Lucius and Audaldus			300		
Andrew the Tribune			300		
Ardalion			300		
Autonomous			300		
Callistratus			300		
Candida			300		
Carpophorus and Abundius			300		
Cindeus			300		
Clerus			300		
Crescentius of Perugia			300		
Dasius			300		
Epicharis			300		
Flavius			300		Bishop of Nicomedia
Hermes			300		
Hieron			300		
Hieronides			300		
Jovinian			300		
Leontius			300		
Lucy and Geminian			300		
Lupercus (Luperculus)			300		
Marciana			300		
Mary the Slave or Rome			300		
Memmius (Menge, Meinge)			300		Bishop of Châlons-sur-Marne
Mercurius			300		
Montanus			300		
Papas			300		
Papulus			300		
Sanctinus			300		Bishop of Meaux
Severinus			300		Bishop of Trier
Theonas			300		Patriarch of Alexandria
Theophilus Scholasticus (the Lawyer)			300		
Trophimus and Thalus			300		
Zeno			300		

== See also ==
- Christianity in the 3rd century
- List of Church Fathers
