= June 1 (Eastern Orthodox liturgics) =

Day in the Eastern Orthodox liturgical calendar

Eastern Orthodox liturgical calendar
May 31	June 1	June 2
June 1 O.S. ≍ June 14 N.S. June 1 N.S ≍ May 19 O.S.

June 1 in Eastern Orthodox liturgical calendars is a feast day and a day of commemoration of saints and martyrs. Although some Orthodox churches use the Revised Julian Calendar and others use the traditional Julian calendar, the fixed commemorations for their respective June 1 are broadly the same, no matter which calendar is used. (Note: Despite the dates being the same, the days to which they refer typically differ by 13 days. The notation Old Style or O.S. is sometimes used to indicate a date in the traditional Julian Calendar (the "Old Calendar"). The notation New Style or N.S. indicates a date in the Revised Julian calendar (the "New Calendar").)

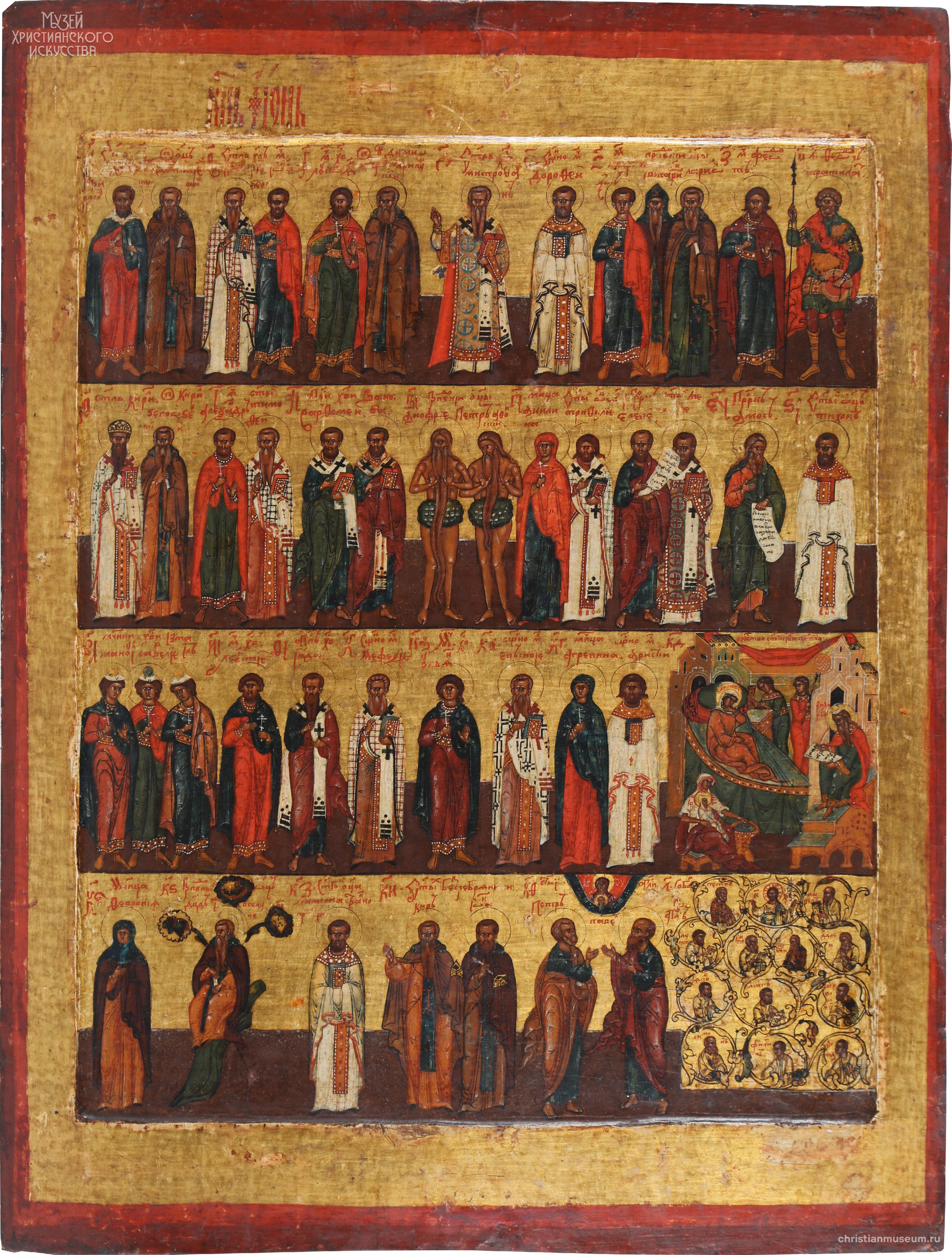
Menaion calendar icon - June: one day, one saint

== Saints ==
- Martyrs Justin the Philosopher (Justin Martyr), Chariton, Charita, Euelpistus, Hierax, Peonus, Valerian (Liberianus), and Justus at Rome (166)
- Martyr Neon, by beheading
- Saint Pyrrus, Bishop, reposed in peace (Note: Name days celebrated today include: Pyrros, Pyros (Πύρρος).)
- Martyr Thespesius of Cappadocia (222) (Note: "In Cappadocia, in the time of the emperor Alexander and the prefect Simplicius, the holy martyr Thespesius, who, after undergoing many torments, was beheaded.")
- Martyrs Ischyrion, a military officer, and five other soldiers, in Egypt (250) (Note: "In Egypt, under the emperor Diocletian, the holy martyrs Ischyrion, military officer, and five other soldiers, who were put to death in different manners for the faith of Christ.")
- The holy Ten thousand Martyrs, in Antiochia (249-251)
- Martyr Firmus, under the eparch Magus (299) (Note: "Also, St. Firmus, martyr, who was scourged most severely, struck with stones, and finally decapitated during the persecution of Maximian.")
- Martyr Gerasimos (Note: Martyr Gerasimos is unknown in the Synaxarium. His memory is recorded in a Codex of the Moni Vlatadon (which was founded c. 1351 in Thessaloniki).)
- Saint Metrius the Farmer of Myra in Lycia (912)

== Pre-Schism Western saints ==
- Martyrs Felinus and Gratinianus (250) (Note: Soldiers in the imperial army martyred in Perugia in Italy under Decius. Their relics were translated to Arona near Milan in 979.) (Note: "At Perugia, the holy martyrs Felinus and Gratinian, soldiers under Decius, who were variously tortured, and thus by a glorious death won the palm of martyrdom.")
- Hieromartyrs Reverianus (Bishop) and Paul (priest), with ten others, at Autun (272) (Note: Born in Italy, Reverianus, a bishop, and Paul, a priest, went to France. They enlightened Autun and the surrounding area and were martyred with several companions under Aurelian.) (Note: "At Autun, the Saints Reverian, bishop, and Paul, priest, with ten others, who were crowned with martyrdom under the emperor Aurelian.")
- Martyr Crescentian, in Saldo near Città di Castello in Italy (287) (Note: "At Citta-di-Castello, in Umbria, St. Crescentian, a Eoman soldier, crowned with martyrdom under the same emperor.")
- Martyr Juventius, in Rome
- Martyr Proclus, at Bologna (304)
- Martyr Secundus, at Amelia in Umbria, when thrown into the Tiber (304) (Note: "At Amelia, in the reign of Diocletian, St. Secundus, martyr, who consummated his martyrdom by being thrown into the Tiber.")
- Martyr Clarus of Acquitaine, a Bishop believed to have been sent to evangelize Aquitaine, France
- Saint Fortunatus of Spoleto the Wonderworker (400) (Note: At Montefalco in Umbria, St. Fortunatus, a priest renowned for his virtues and his miracles.)
- Saint Caprasius of Lérins, Abbot (430) (Note: Born in France, he went to live as a hermit to the island of Lérins. He was followed by Sts Honoratus and Venantius. Together they went to the East to learn from the monasteries there. Venantius reposed in Greece; the other two returned to Lérins, where St. Honoratus founded the monastery of Lérins. Later he became Bishop of Arles and was succeeded by Caprasius as abbot.)
- Saint Ronan of Locronan (Ronan of Cornouaille (Cornwall)), an early bishop who preached in Cornouaille in Brittany (6th century) (Note: [Venerated in Brittany, and especially at Quimper. There was another S. Ronan, first abbot of Drumshallon, in Ireland, who died of the great plague in the year 665. Another S. Ronan was brother of S. Carnech, who died in 530. Another S. Ronan was a monk, who having learned abroad the right lime for celebrating Easter, endeavoured to force S. Finan, the successor of S. Aidan in the see of Lindisfarne, to give up the Keltic rite for the Roman one. Ronan, says Bede III., c. 28, "nequaquam Finanum emendare potuit; quia potius, quod esset homo ferocis animi, acerbiorem castigando et apertum veritatis adversarium reddidit." It is not easy at first sight to determine whether by the "man of ferocious or rough mind" Bede meant Finan or Ronan; but the phrase "castigando," used by him to denote Ronan's mode of arguing, a mode very unbecoming towards a bishop, inclines one to think that he alluded to Ronan, who appears to have been a bitter (acerrimus) disputant. Colgan says that this S. Ronan was venerated in Brittany, and he has printed the Acts of the Brittany saint on Jan. 8th, the day on which the Ronan mentioned by Bede is venerated. But he made a mistake, the two saints are quite distinct. Authority: — The life of S. Ronan in the Quimper Breviary. In France S. Ronan is called S. Renan.] "S. Ronan, an Irish bishop, left his native island at the end of the 5th century, and came to Leon in Brittany, where he retired into a hermitage in the forest of Nevet. He received Grallo, king of Brittany, in his little cell on many occasions, as the king loved to spend long hours with him, hearing him speak and asking him questions. The story told in the Quimper Breviary is that the wife of the king, whose name was Queban, one day put her little daughter, aged five, in a box with bread and milk, whilst she devoted her time to more agreeable pursuits than looking after the children. But the little girl got a crust down her throat and choked. The queen, in a great fright, shut up the box and rushed screaming about in quest of her child, who, she pretended, had strayed. She found her way to the hermits' cell, where her husband was conversing on theology with the Irish saint. The woman at once began to storm at the hermit for detaining the king so long from home. "But for you!" exclaimed she, with truly feminine rapidity of arriving at a conclusion, "my daughter would not have been lost." "Fie, bold woman," said S. Ronan; "tell no more falsehoods, the child is in a box with a bowl of milk and some bread at home." And he rose up, and followed by the king and the queen, sought the palace, where he found the damsel, in the box, as he had said. Then Queban was stoned with stones till she died, and Ronan, casting himself on his knees, restored the dead girl to life.")
- Saint Wite, a female Dorset saint martyred by the Danes, buried at Whitchurch Canonicorum (c. 831) (Note: An Anglo-Saxon holy woman, martyred by the Danes in Dorset in England. Her relics still exist in their shrine at Whitchurch Canonicorum: the only ones to have survive in a parish church in England. Pilgrims still honour her at the shrine and there is a holy well at Morcombe Lake nearby. (See also: Saint Wite's Cross).)
- Saint Wigstan (Wystan, Wistan, Winston), of the royal house of Mercia in England (849) (Note: "ST. WISTAN, King and Martyr, was the son of Alfleda, descended from the ancient royal race of Mercia, and Wimund, son of Wiglaf, actually reigning under the suzerainty of the kings of Wessex. For withstanding the marriage, in contempt of the laws of the Church, of Bertferth his godfather (son of Bertwulf, the successor of Wiglaf on the throne of Mercia) with his widowed mother Alfleda, the innocent youth was cruelly slain, and secretly buried by Bertferth, at a place in Leicestershire, since called, from the Martyr, Wistanstow, now Wistow. Over this spot a pillar of heavenly light was seen for the space of thirty days. St. Wistan's body, thus revealed, was taken up and carried to the Abbey of Repton in Derbyshire, the place of sepulture of his grandfather Wiglaf, where his relics were held in veneration until the eleventh century, when they were translated to the Abbey of Evesham.")
- Saint Gaudentius, Bishop of Ossero, Istria (1044)
- Saint Atto, a monk at Oña, Spain with Saint Íñigo (Enneco), who later became Bishop of Oca-Valpuesta (c. 1044)
- Saint Íñigo (Enneco) of Oña, Spain (1057)

== Post-Schism Orthodox saints ==
- Venerable Agapetus, Unmercenary Physician of the Kiev Near Caves (1095)
- Venerable Dionysius, Abbot of Glushitsa (Glushetsk), Vologda, Wonderworker (1437)
- Synaxis of the Holy Martyrs of Georgia: Shio the New, David, Gabriel, and Paul of Akhalkalaki (Akhakalakhi) and Saint David Gareji Monastery (1696-1700)
- Saint Justin Popović, Archimandrite of Ćelije Monastery in Serbia (1979) (Note: "The liturgical commemoration of Venerable Justin will be celebrated on June 1 according to the old calendar (June 14 according to the new calendar).")

=== New martyrs and confessors ===
- New Hieromartyr Onuphrius (Gagalyuk), Bishop of Kharkov (1938) (Note: He was canonized by the Ukrainian Orthodox Church on June 22, 1993. And in August 2000, he was numbered among the New Martyrs and Confessors of Russia.)
- New Hieromartyr Basil, priest, Virgin-martyr Vera Samsonov (1940)

== Other commemorations ==
- Commemoration of the deliverance of the island of Lefkada from the plague through the intercession of Saint Bessarion (†1540), Archbishop of Larissa (c. 1743) (Note: In August of 1743 the Hieromonk Matthew came to the island of Lefkada from the monastery of Doukisou near Trikala, bringing with him the holy relic (skull) of Saint Bessarion (†1540), Archbishop of Larissa (September 15). With the Saints' intercession they were delivered from the terrible disease, and erected a church in his honour. Today the area is called "St Kara" (Greek: «Ἁγία Κάρα»).)
- Repose of Elder Philaret of Kapsala, Mount Athos (1975)
- Glorification (1990) of Righteous John of Kronstadt (1908)

== Icon gallery ==
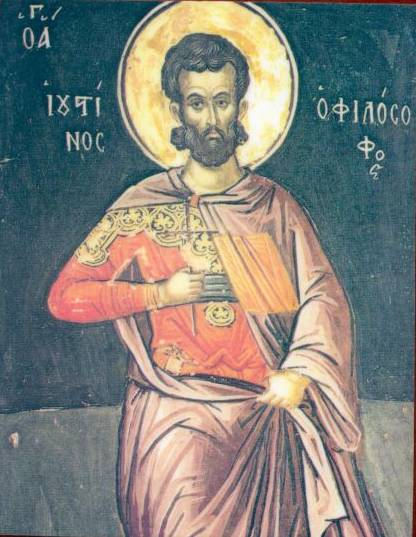
St. Justin Martyr.

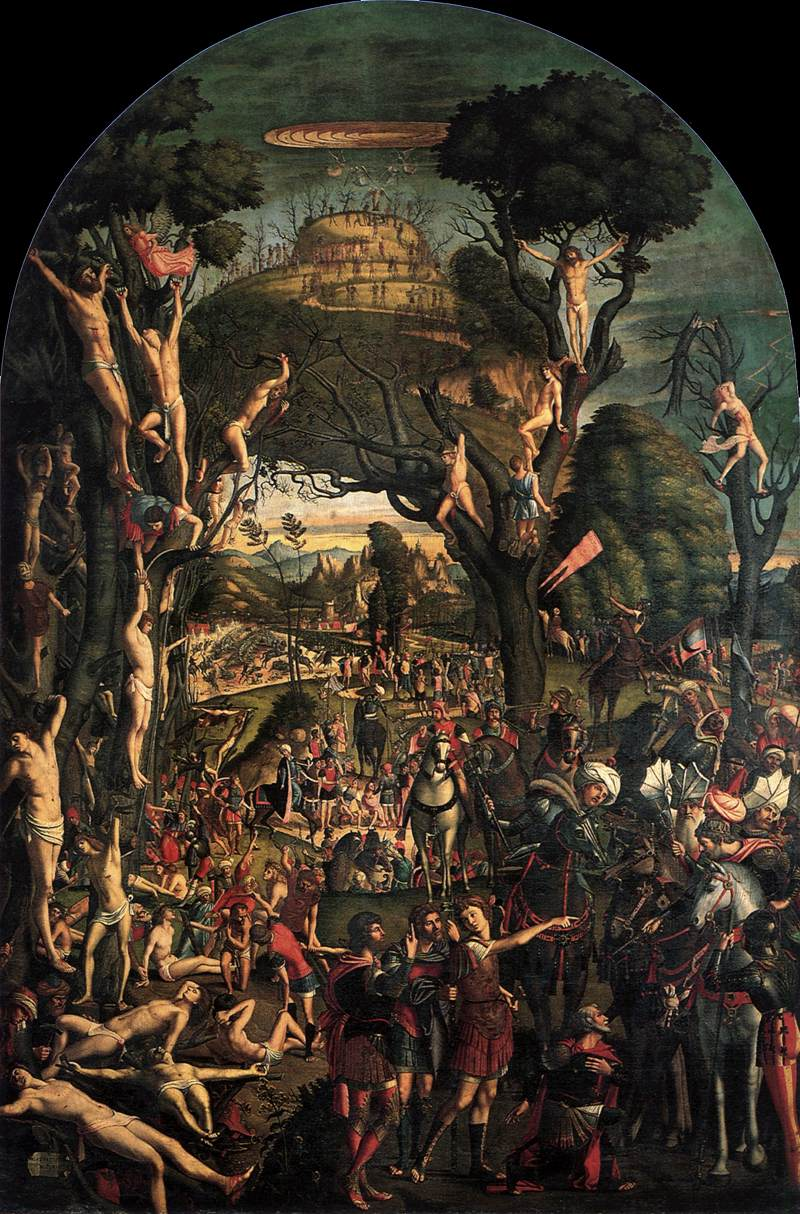
Crucifixion and Apotheosis of the Ten Thousand Martyrs. By Vittore Carpaccio, 1515.

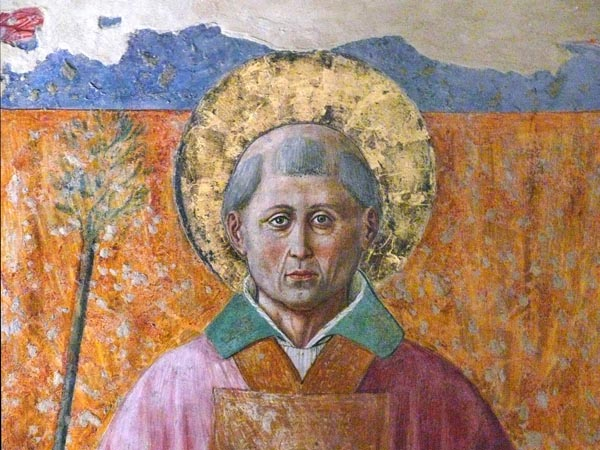
Fresco of St. Fortunatus of Spoleto.

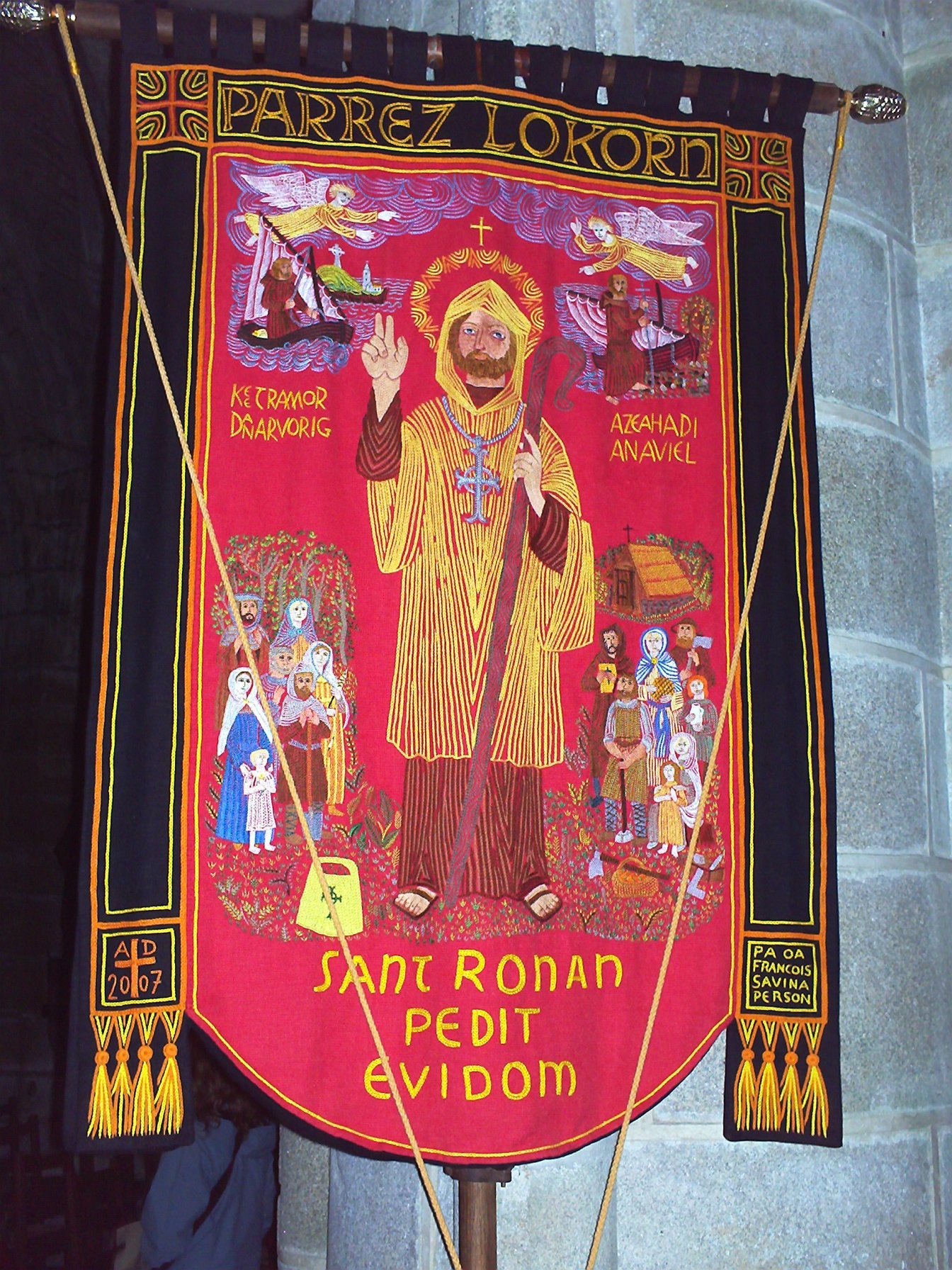
Standard of St. Ronan of Locronan.

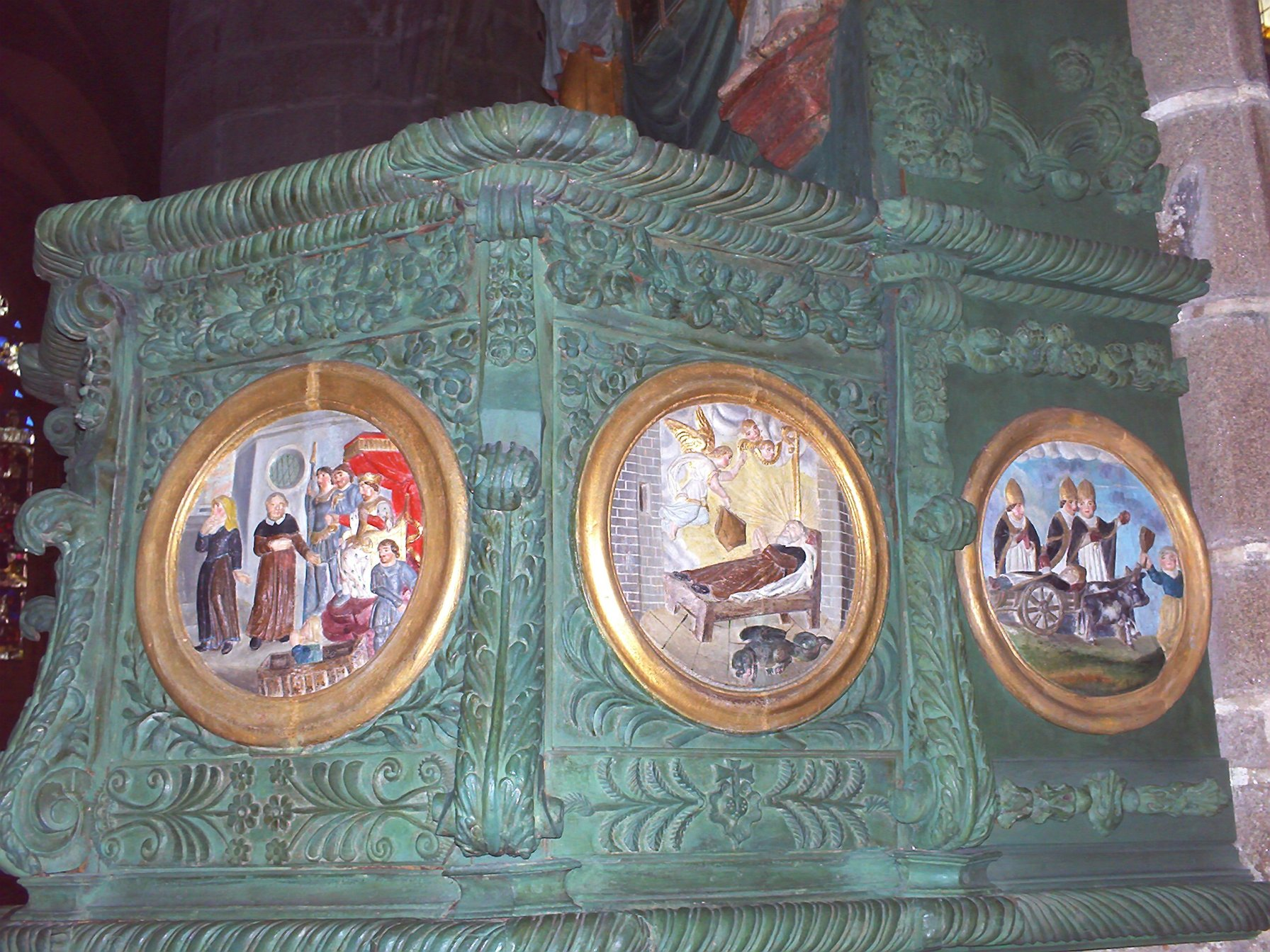
Scenes from the life of St. Ronan of Locronan on the polychrome pulpit at the Locronan parish church.

St. Wite's Cross (the flag of Dorset).

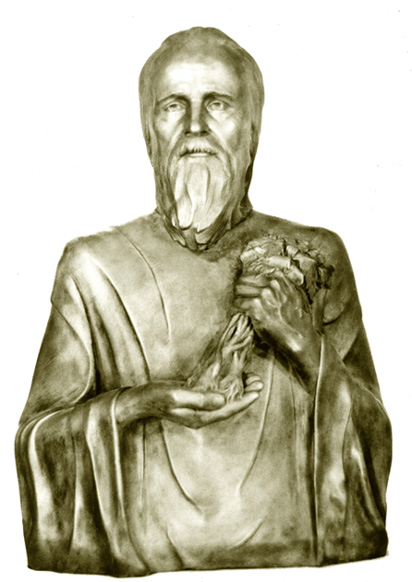
St. Agapetus of the Kiev Caves.

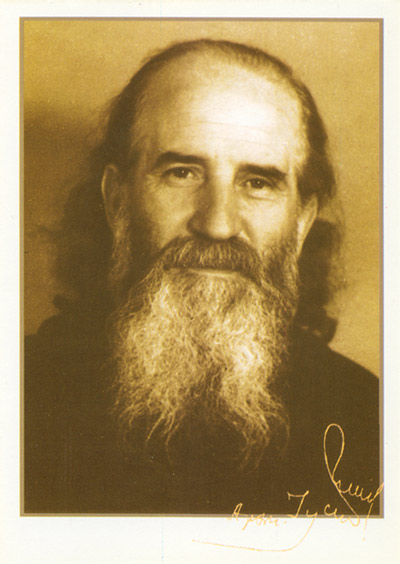
St. Justin Popović.

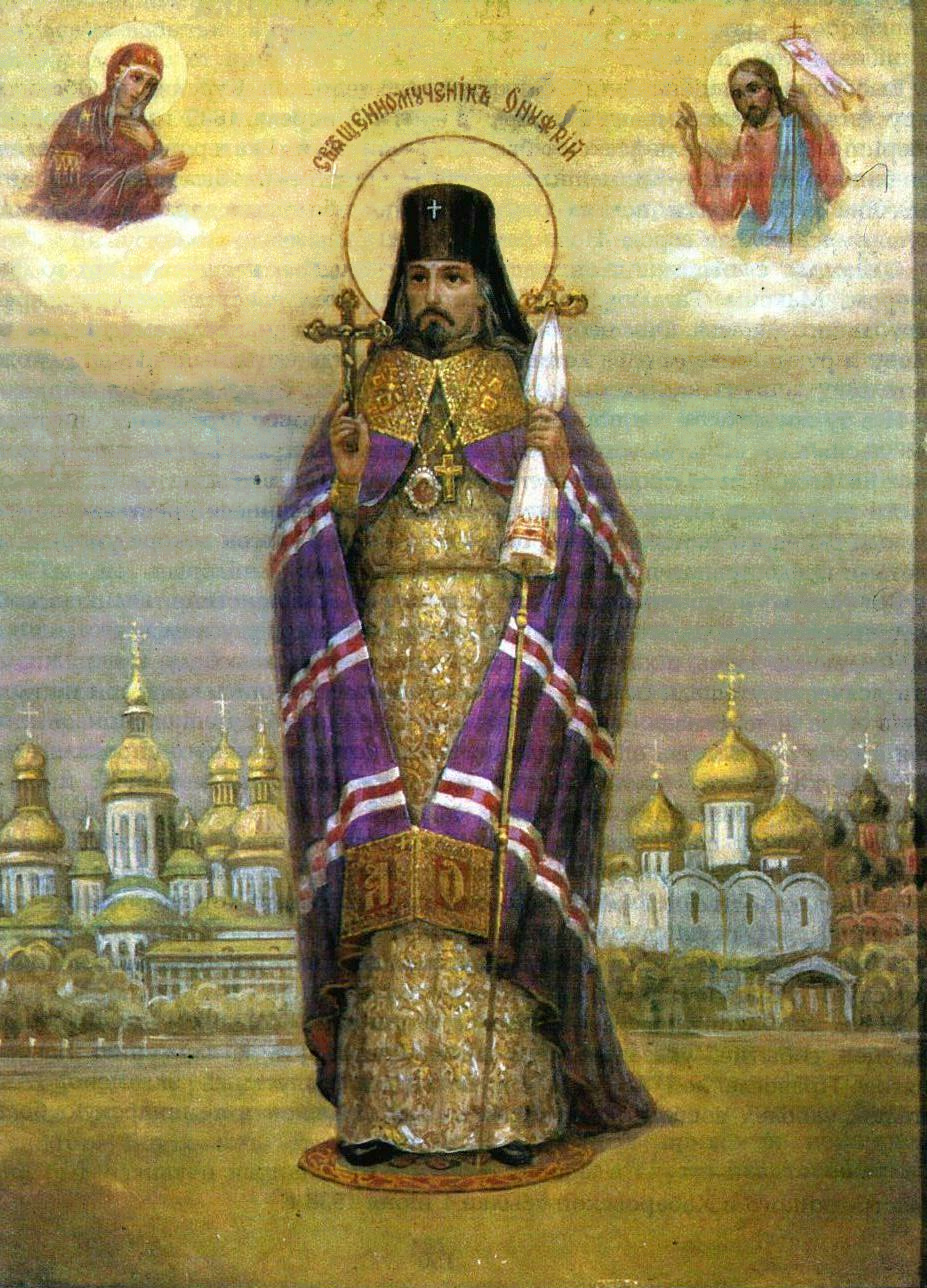
New Hieromartyr Onuphrius (Gagalyuk), Bishop of Kharkov.

== Sources ==
- June 1/14. Orthodox Calendar (PRAVOSLAVIE.RU).
- June 14 / June 1. HOLY TRINITY RUSSIAN ORTHODOX CHURCH (A parish of the Patriarchate of Moscow).
- June 1. OCA - The Lives of the Saints.
- The Autonomous Orthodox Metropolia of Western Europe and the Americas (ROCOR). St. Hilarion Calendar of Saints for the year of our Lord 2004. St. Hilarion Press (Austin, TX). p. 40.
- The First Day of the Month of June. Orthodoxy in China.
- June 1. Latin Saints of the Orthodox Patriarchate of Rome.
- The Roman Martyrology. Transl. by the Archbishop of Baltimore. Last Edition, According to the Copy Printed at Rome in 1914. Revised Edition, with the Imprimatur of His Eminence Cardinal Gibbons. Baltimore: John Murphy Company, 1916. pp. 159–160.
- Rev. Richard Stanton. A Menology of England and Wales, or, Brief Memorials of the Ancient British and English Saints Arranged According to the Calendar, Together with the Martyrs of the 16th and 17th Centuries. London: Burns & Oates, 1892. pp. 249–250.

Greek Sources

- Great Synaxaristes: (in Greek) 1 ΙΟΥΝΙΟΥ. ΜΕΓΑΣ ΣΥΝΑΞΑΡΙΣΤΗΣ.
- (in Greek) Συναξαριστής. 1 Ιουνίου. ECCLESIA.GR. (H ΕΚΚΛΗΣΙΑ ΤΗΣ ΕΛΛΑΔΟΣ).
- (in Greek) June 1. Ορθόδοξος Συναξαριστής.

Russian Sources

- (in Russian) 14 июня (1 июня). Православная Энциклопедия под редакцией Патриарха Московского и всея Руси Кирилла (электронная версия). (Orthodox Encyclopedia - Pravenc.ru).
- (in Russian) 1 июня (ст.ст.) 14 июня 2013 (нов. ст.). Русская Православная Церковь Отдел внешних церковных связей. (DECR).
- (in Russian) 1 июня по старому стилю / 14 июня по новому стилю. Русская Православная Церковь - Православный церковный календарь на 2026 год.
