= El Kenissia =

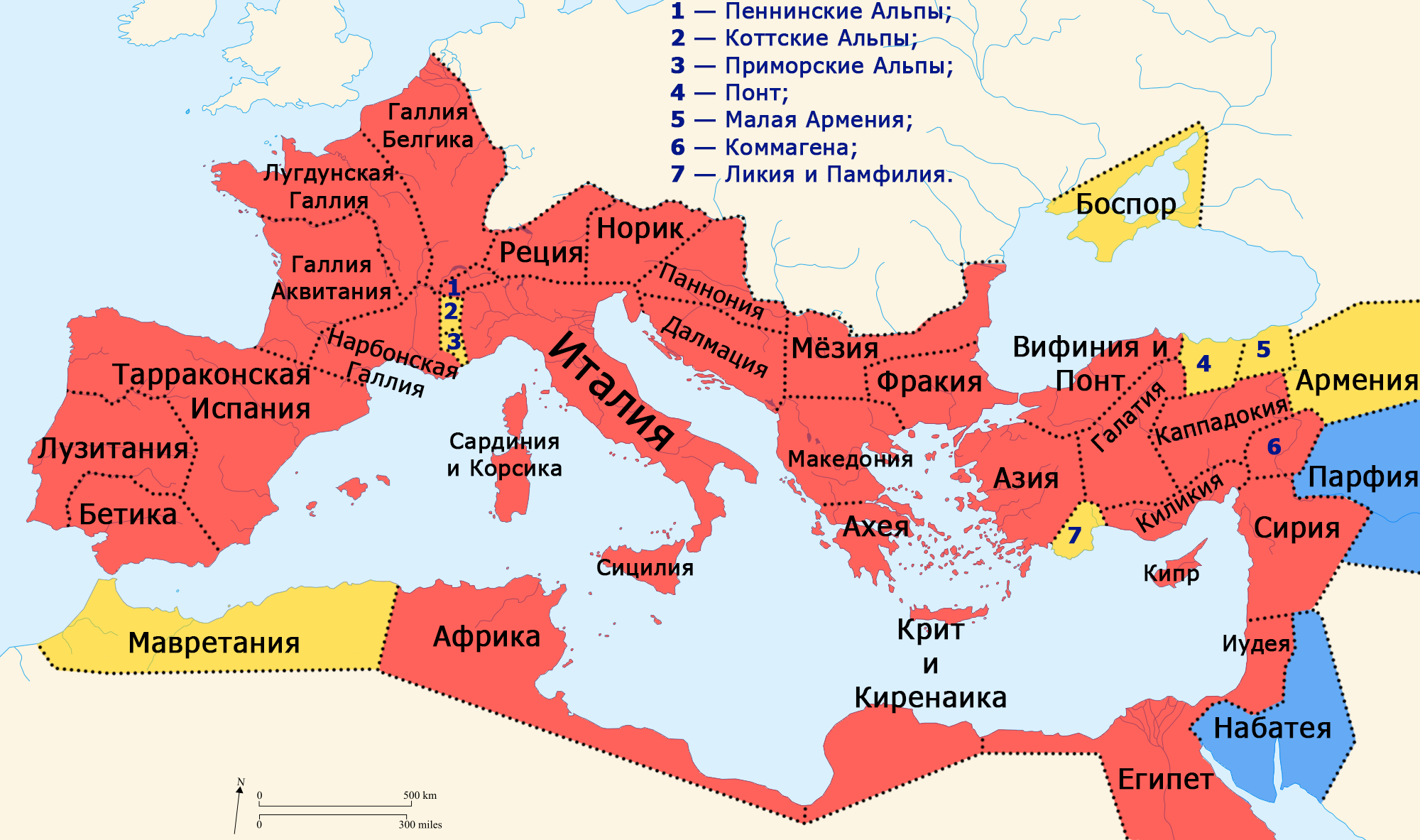
Roman Empire 37 AD

El Kenissia is a locality in Tunisia, North Africa.

El Kenissia is 6 kilometres (3.7 mi) south of Hadrumetum and is notable for the ruins of Civitas Pophtensis, a civitas of Roman North Africa, which include a Punic era temple complex, which was excavated by the French, and a Roman Era theater.

== See also ==
- Louis Carton
