= Saint Conon =

Saint Conon may refer to:

- Conon of Perga or Conon the Gardener (died c. 250), a martyr saint of the Roman Empire
- Saint Conan (died 684), a bishop of the Isle of Man and an Irish missionary
- Conon of Naso (1139–1236), a Basilian abbot at Naso, Sicily
