= Felicissima =

Felicissima is a Latin female name meaning "most happy". It may refer to:

- Saint Felicissima, a 3rd-century saint of Umbria, often linked with Saint Firmina
- ancient Roman martyr, possibly a misspelling of Saint Felinus (died c. 250), another Roman martyr
