= Saint Valerius =

Saint Valerius is the name of:

- Valerius of Saragossa (died 315), patron saint of Zaragoza
- Valerius of Trèves (died 320), semi-legendary bishop of Trier
- Valerius and Rufinus (died 287), martyrs
