= Rictius Varus =

Prefect in Roman Gaul

Rictius Varus (Rictiovarus, Rixius Varus, Rexius Vicarius) was a Vicarius in Roman Gaul at the end of the 3rd century, around the time of the Diocletianic Persecution. The Roman Martyrology contains many references to the prefect Rixius Varus, who is said to have persecuted hundreds of Christians. In Christian hagiography he later repented and became a Christian martyr himself, and is regarded a Saint in the Eastern Orthodox and Roman Catholic Churches, with his feast day on July 6.

Modern scholars, however, question his existence and reject the story of his conversion.

== Roman Prefect and Persecutor ==
He was appointed by the Emperor Maximian, and severely persecuted Christians. He is mentioned in Christian martyrologies with his name occurring in the stories of:

- Valerius and Rufinus (287) (Note: "After Emperor Maximian Herculius defeated the Bagaude near Paris, he left Rictius Varus behind as praefectus-praetorii in Gaul and ordered him to extirpate all Christians. Once Rictius Varus had cleansed the region near Rheims, he went to Soissons, and ordered Rufinus and Valerius to be brought before him. They had hidden themselves in a wood at word of the persecution. Unfortunately, they were discovered, tortured, and beheaded on the high road leading to Soissons (Benedictines, Encyclopedia, Husenbeth).")
- Saint Quentin (287) (Note: "...At all hours of the day he invoked his God in fervent supplications. But this apostolate could not escape the notice of Rictiovarus, the Roman prosecutor who at that time represented Maximian in Gaul. Saint Quentin was seized at Amiens, thrown into prison, and loaded with chains. Rictiovarus asked him: "How does it happen that you, of such high nobility and the son of so distinguished a father, have given yourself up to so superstitious a religion, a folly, and that you adore an unfortunate man crucified by other men?" Saint Quentin replied: "It is sovereign nobility to adore the Creator of heaven and earth, and to obey willingly His divine commandments. What you call folly is supreme wisdom. What is there that is wiser than to recognize the unique true God, and to reject with disdain the counterfeits, which are mute, false and deceiving?"...")
- Crispin and Crispinian (286)
- Gentian, Fulcian and Victorice (287 or 303).
- Donatian and Rogatian (c. 288–290).
- Martyrs Maxentius, Constantius, Crescentius, Justinus and their Companions, martyrs in Trier in Germany in the reign of Diocletian, under the governor Rictiovarus (c. 287) (Note: "At Treves, the holy martyrs Maxentius, Constantius, Crescentius, Justinus, and their companions, who suffered in the persecution of Diocletian, under the governor Rictiovarus.")
- Palmatius and Companions, martyrs in Trier in Germany under Maximian (c. 287) (Note: "At Treves, the holy martyrs Palmatius and his companions, who suffered martyrdom in the persecution of Diocletian, under the governor Rictiovarus.")
- Alexander of Trier, "the 12th bishop of Trier, was martyred by the Roman prefect Rictiovarus during the Diocletian persecution" (3rd century) (Note: "Alexander (Oct 5) - 3rd cent. One of the 'innumerable multitude' martyred in Trier in Germany under Diocletian.")

According to the Catholic Encyclopedia, he tried to kill himself in despair after failing to kill Crispin and Crispinian. (Note: "...When Maximianus saw that his efforts were of no avail, he gave Crispin and Crispinian into the hands of the governor Rictiovarus (Rictius Varus), a most cruel persecutor of the Christians. Under the order of Rictiovarus they were stretched on the rack, thongs were cut from their flesh, and awls were driven under their finger-nails. A millstone was then fastened about the neck of each, and they were thrown into the Aisne, but they were able to swim to the opposite bank of the river. In the same manner they suffered no harm from a great fire in which Rictiovarus, in despair, sought death himself. Afterwards the two saints were beheaded at the command of Maximianus...")

== Christian Martyr ==
In Christian hagiography he repented and became a Christian martyr himself. The Roman Martyrology has his feast day on July 6, and states:

The same day, St. Lucia, martyr, a native of Campania. Being arrested and severely tortured by the lieutenant-governor Rictiovarus, she converted him to Christ. To them were added Antoninus, Severinus, Diodorus, Dion, and seventeen others, who shared their sufferings and their crowns.

Rexius also appears on July 6 in the calendar of the Eastern Orthodox Church, being martyred by beheading together with Virgin-martyr Lucy and several other martyrs, due to their courageous witness for Christ:

The Holy Martyrs Lucy (Lucia) the Virgin, Rexius, Antoninus, Lucian, Isidore, Dion, Diodorus, Cutonius, Arnosus, Capicus and Satyrus:

St Lucy, a native of the Italian district of Campania, from the time of her youth dedicated herself to God and lived in an austere and chaste manner. While still quite young, she was taken captive and carried off into a foreign land by Rexius, who had the title of Vicarius (a substitute for a dead or absent provincial governor). Rexius at first tried to compel St Lucy to sacrifice to idols but, she remained firm in her faith and was ready to accept torture for the sake of Christ. Rexius was inspired with profound respect for her and even permitted her and her servants the use of a separate house, where they lived in solitude, spending their time in unceasing prayer. Whenever he left to go on military campaigns, Rexius reverently asked for St Lucy's prayers, and he returned victorious.

After 20 years St Lucy, having learned that the emperor Diocletian had begun a persecution against Christians, entreated Rexius to send her back to Italy. She wanted to glorify the Lord together with her fellow countrymen. Rexius, under the influence of St Lucy, had already accepted Christianity by this time, and even longed for martyrdom. Leaving behind his retinue and family, he went to Rome with St Lucy. The Roman prefect Aelius sentenced them to be beheaded with a sword. After them the holy martyrs Antoninus, Lucian, Isidore, Dion, Diodorus, Cutonis, Arnosus, Capicus and Satyrus were also beheaded. In all, twenty-four martyrs suffered with Sts Lucy and Rexius. (Note: His hagiography in the Great Synaxaristes is as follows (in Greek): "Ἡ Ἁγία Λούκια, συνελήφθη ἀπὸ τὸν Ρῆξο Βικάριο, ποὺ τὴν ἀνάγκαζε νὰ θυσιάσει στὰ εἴδωλα καὶ νὰ ἀρνηθεῖ τὸν Χριστό. Ἡ Λούκια ὄχι μόνο δὲν πείστηκε, ἀλλὰ ὁδήγησε στὴν πίστη τοῦ Χριστοῦ τὸν Ρῆξο, ἀπὸ τὸν ὁποῖο, ἀξιώθηκε μεγάλων τιμῶν καὶ ἐγκαταστάθηκε σὲ ἕνα ἥσυχο σπίτι, ὅπου καταγινόταν μὲ τὴν προσευχὴ καὶ τὴ νηστεία. Παρακάλεσε δὲ τὸν Ρῆξο νὰ πάει στὴν Κομπανία τῆς Ἰταλίας καὶ νὰ μαρτυρήσει ἐκεῖ γιὰ τὸν Χριστό. Ὁ δὲ Ρῆξος, ἀφοῦ ἐγκατέλειψε γυναῖκα, παιδιά, πλοῦτο καὶ ὅλη τὴν κοσμικὴ δόξα, ἀναχώρησε μὲ τὴν Ἁγία. Στὴν πόλη αὐτὴ συνελήφθησαν καὶ οἱ δυό. Μπροστὰ στὸν ἡγεμόνα ὁμολόγησαν μὲ θάρρος τὸν Χριστὸ καὶ γι' αὐτὸ ἀποκεφαλίστηκαν. Μαζί τους ἀποκεφαλίστηκαν καὶ πολλοὶ ἄλλοι Ἅγιοι Μάρτυρες.")

== In German Legend ==
A very different fate is attributed to "Rixius Varus" by the peasantry of the German Saarland. According to the art-historian and mythographer Karl Lohmeyer, it was believed that after his death the persecutor could not rest in his tomb, and haunts the Varuswald forest near the town of Tholey as a Wild Huntsman, flying through the air with a ghostly band and threatening punishment to transgressors.
