= Fidelis of Como =

Saint Fidelis of Como
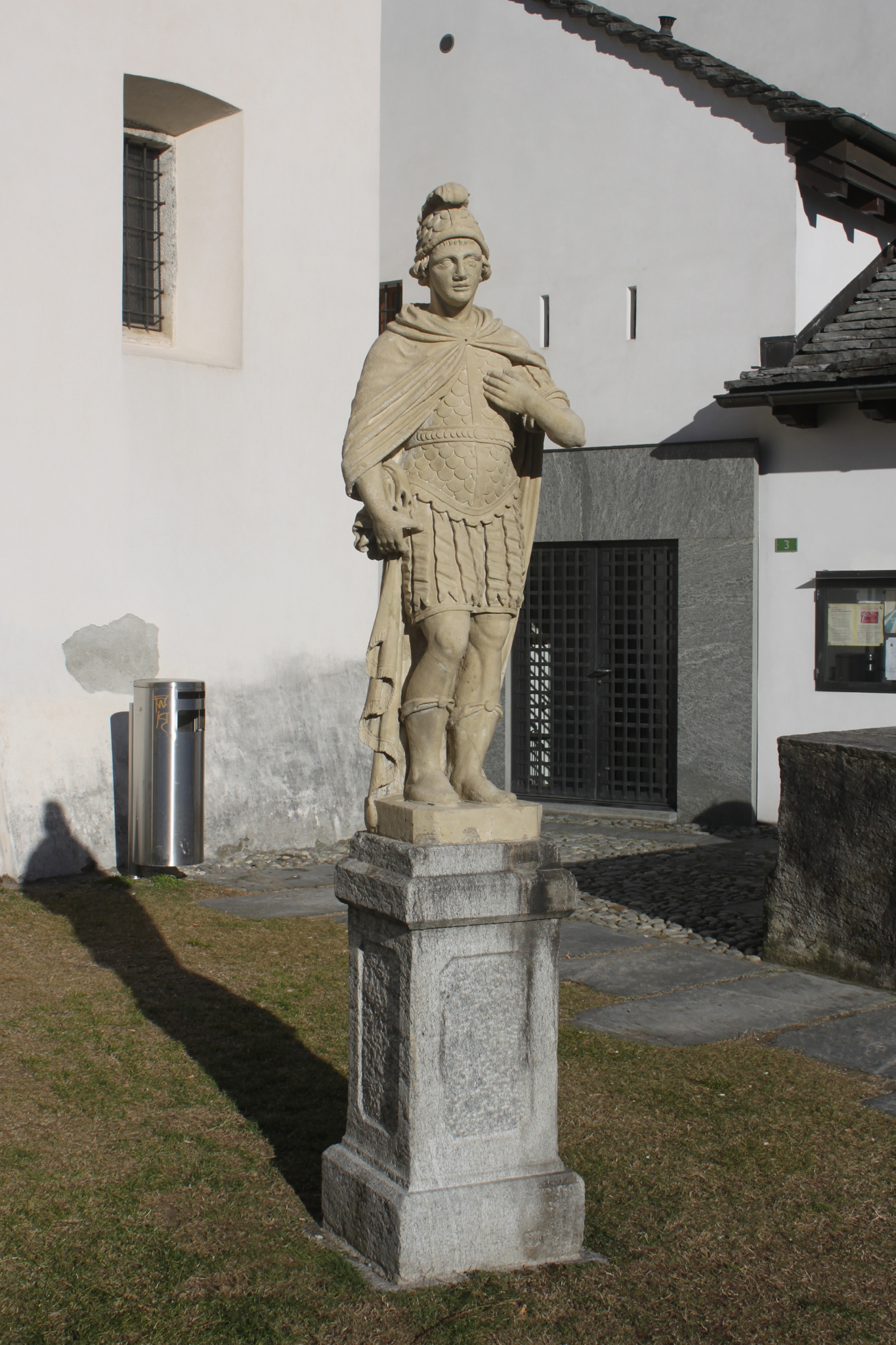
- S. Fedele at Verscio
- Died: c. 304 north side of Lake Como
- Venerated in: Roman Catholic Church
- Major shrine: Relics claimed by Milan, Como, and Arona
- Feast: October 28; March 13 (With Felinus and Gratian, and Carpophorus)
- Attributes: Military attire

Fidelis of Como (died c. 304) was an Italian military saint, according to Christian tradition.

== Legends ==
Fidelis' cult is associated with Carpophorus and Exanthus, two other soldier-saints. Variations on their legend are applied to Fidelis. The first says that he, with Carpophorus and Exanthus, were Roman soldiers, members of the legendary Theban Legion, who deserted during the persecution of Christians by Maximian. The three split up at Como, with Carpophorus and Exanthus going into hiding, while Fidelis took a boat across the lake to Samolaco. All were eventually caught and beheaded.

The second says that Fidelis was an army officer who was guarding Christian prisoners at Milan, including Alexander of Bergamo. He managed to procure the freedom of five of these prisoners. With Carpophorus and Exanthus, he and these five attempted to make their way to the Alps, but were executed at Como.

More likely, he was a Christian missionary sent by Maternus (bishop of Milan) to convert the still pagan area around Lake Como, and there met his death.

== Veneration ==
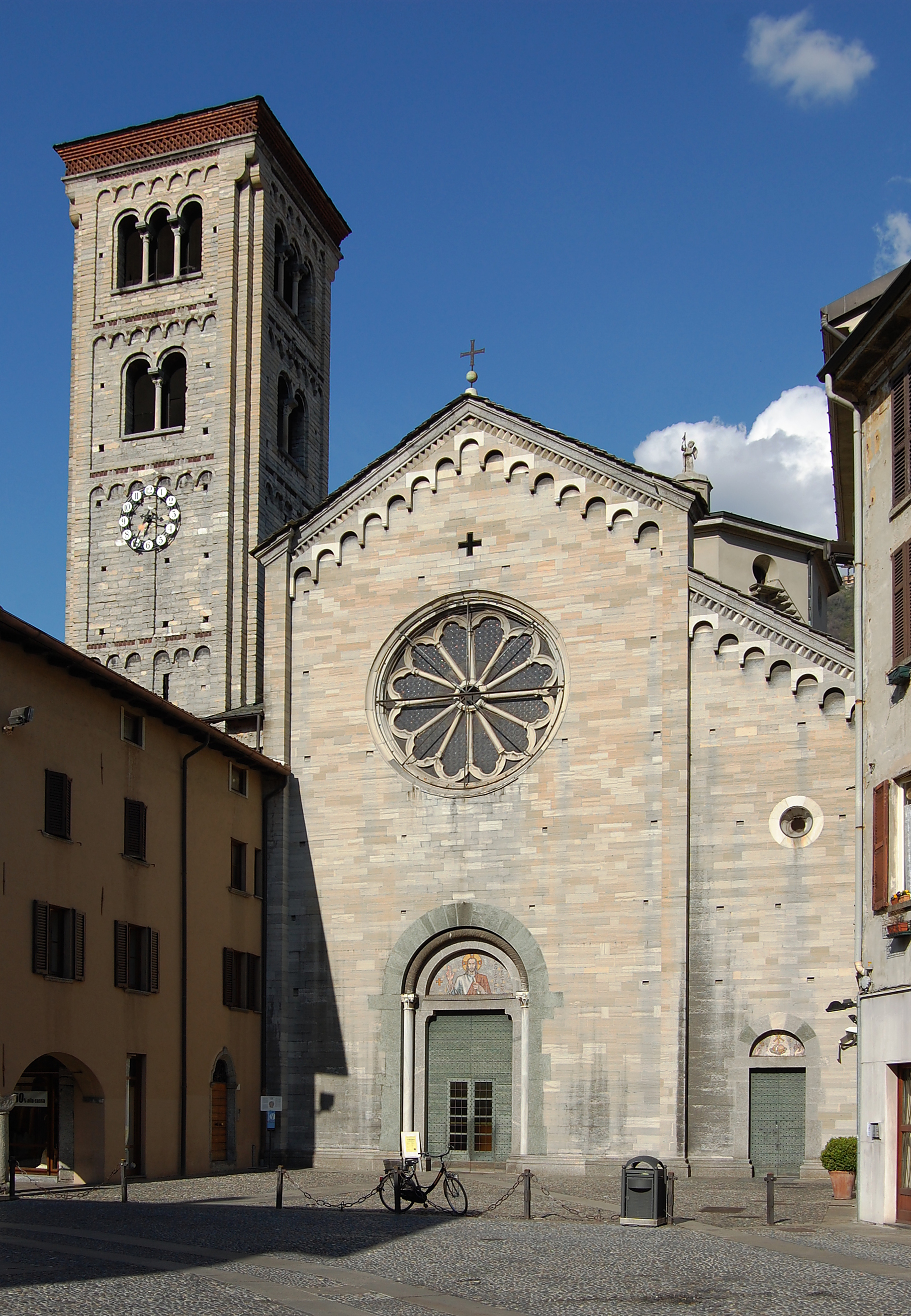
The Basilica of San Fedele in Como

The cult of Fidelis at Como is ancient. Milan, Como, and Arona claim the relics of Fidelis.

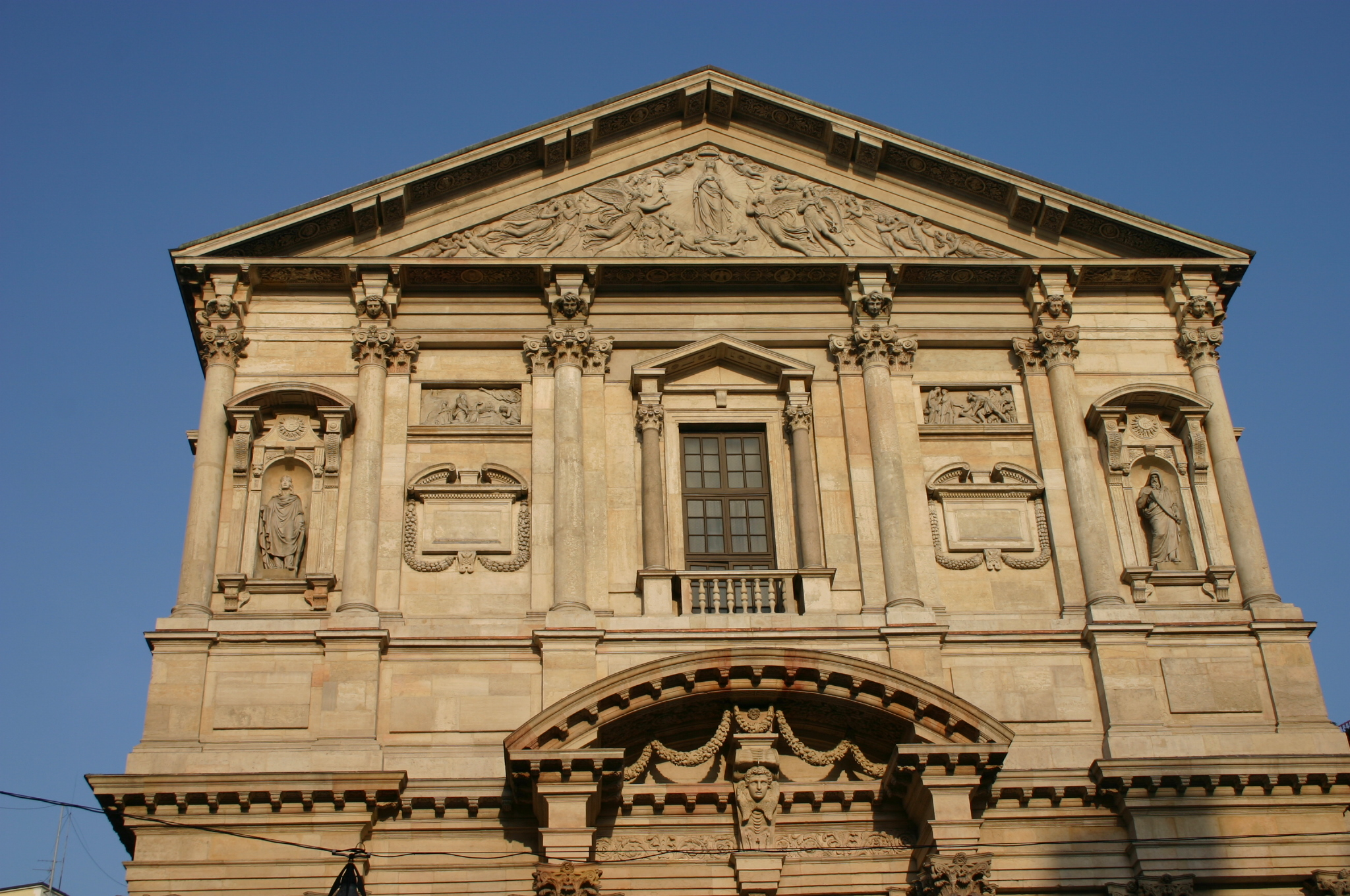
The church of San Fedele in Milan

Magnus Felix Ennodius describes, in the early sixth century, a tomb at Como containing the relics of the martyr. Reports of miracles at the tomb fomented the popularity of his cult. Como's claim is based on an account of 964 that describes the translation of Fidelis' relics from the spot where he was killed to Como in that year. Sometime before 1000, the church of Sanfedelino, which was dedicated to him, was built on the site of a much earlier simple chapel, from around the fourth century, previously dedicated to Saint Euphemia.

Relics are said to have been transferred to Arona during a time of war between Milan and Como. In Arona, the presence of the relics of Fidelis and Carpophrous is attested in documents dating back to 1259 and 1321.

In 1576, Charles Borromeo transferred to Milan relics of Carpophorus and Fidelis. Though until then their veneration in Arona was minimal, Borromeo's proposed transfer angered the people of the city. As a compromise, Borromeo brought back to Arona the two left forearms of the saints. This occurred on March 13. The city council, which had been pressured by the populace to bring back the relics, decreed that an annual festival occur on that day, which in succeeding centuries has increased in importance. The purpose of the festival was extended to include the celebration for the martyrs Felinus and Gratian, thereby uniting their cult to that of Carpophorus and Fidelis.

At Milan, Borromeo commissioned the church of San Fedele to Pellegrino Tibaldi (1559).
