= Saint-Révérien =

- Commune
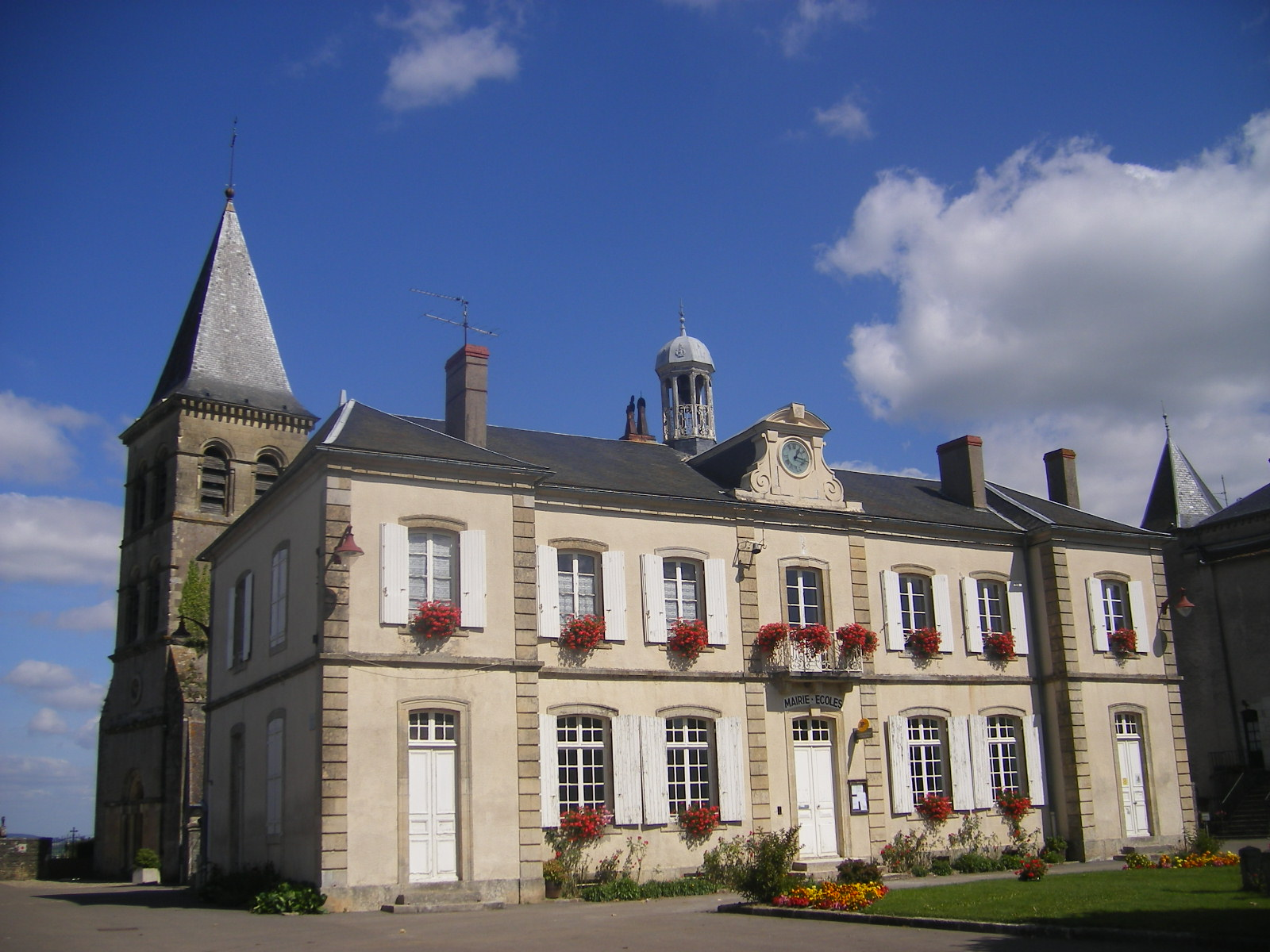
- The town hall in Saint-Révérien

- Coat of arms
- Location of Saint-Révérien
- Location within France Location within Bourgogne-Franche-Comté
- Coordinates: 47°12′39″N 3°30′03″E
- Country: France
- Region: Bourgogne-Franche-Comté
- Department: Nièvre
- Arrondissement: Clamecy
- Canton: Corbigny
- Intercommunality: Tannay-Brinon-Corbigny

Government
  - Mayor (2020–2026): Dominique Maupou
- Area^{1}: 18.48 km^{2} (7.14 sq mi)
- Highest elevation: 382 m (1,253 ft)
- Lowest elevation: 229 m (751 ft)
- Population (2023): 191
  - Density: 10.3/km^{2} (26.8/sq mi)
- Time zone: UTC+01:00 (CET)
  - Summer (DST): UTC+02:00 (CEST)
- INSEE/Postal code: 58266 /58420
- ^{1} French Land Register data, which excludes lakes, ponds, glaciers > 1 km^{2} (0.386 sq mi or 247 acres) and river estuaries.

Saint-Révérien (French pronunciation: [sɛ̃ ʁeveʁjɛ̃]) is a commune in the Nièvre department in central France. It takes its name from St. Reverianus.

== See also ==
- Communes of the Nièvre department
