= Louis Carton =

French physician and archeologist (1861–1924)

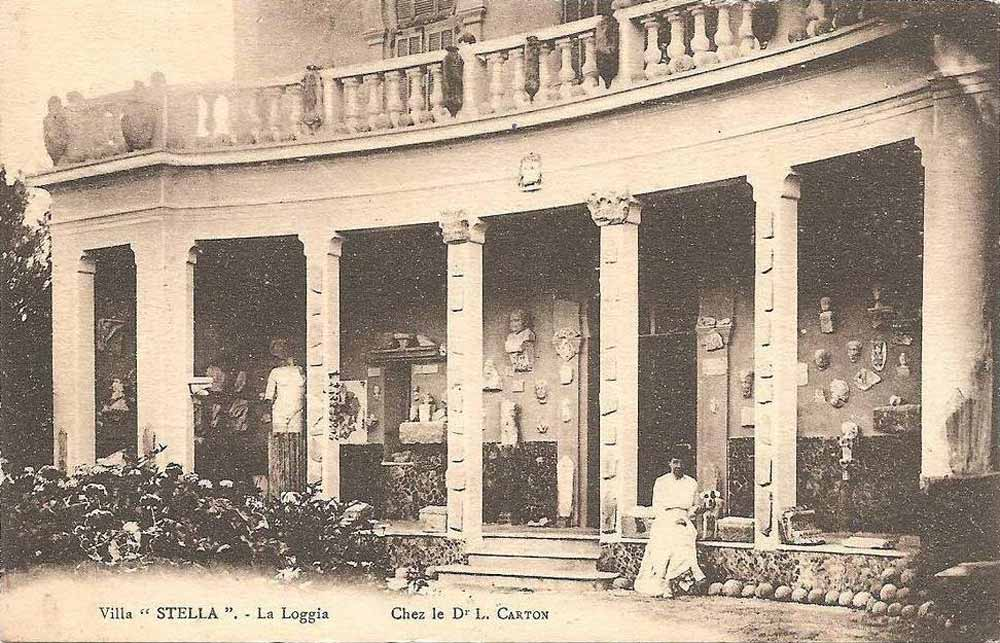
The Villa Stella of Louis Carton in Khereddine near La Goulette.

Louis Carton (born 16 June 1861 in Saint Omer, France ) was a French physician and archaeologist who was active in Tunisia.

== Biography ==
Louis Carton studied medicine at the University of Lille after attending the Lycée in Lille and earned his doctorate in 1883. He then joined the French army as a military doctor and was transferred to Tunisia in 1886. In addition to his work as a physician, he developed a strong interest in archeology. He was first employed in Gabès, then from 1888 in Souk-el-Arba. Here he began to study Bulla Regia. From 1891 he was stationed in Téboursouk, he turned to the archaeological investigation of Thugga. He returned to France for a short time, and In 1902 he was employed in Sousse, where he again turned his attention to his archaeological interests. He founded the Société archéologique de Sousse, studied the catacombs of the ancient Hadrumetum and the sanctuary of the Tanit in El Kenissia. In 1904 he moved to La Goulette, a suburb of Tunis, from where he devoted himself to archaeological researches in Carthage.

In 1901 he became knight of the honorary legion, 1918 officer of the honorary legion, 1910 corresponding member of the Académie des Inscriptions et Belles-Lettres.
