= Victorian, Frumentius and Companions =

Martyrs of Hadrumetum and Carthage, 484

Saints Victorian, Frumentius and Companions

Martyrs
- Died: March 23, 484 AD; Hadrumetum, North Africa
- Venerated in: Roman Catholic Church, Orthodox Church
- Feast: March 23

Victorian, Frumentius and Companions are venerated as Christian martyrs of the Roman Catholic Church and the Orthodox Church, as pre-Great Schism of 1054 martyrs. Prior to 1054 the term Catholic was more commonly in use, and is used below.They were killed at Hadrumetum in 484 by the Arian Vandals. Accounts of their martyrdom state that Huneric, King of the Vandals, began persecuting Catholic priests and virgins in 480, and by 484 began persecuting simple believers as well. Victorian was a wealthy Catholic of Hadrumetum who had been appointed proconsul by Hunneric. He served as an obedient administrator to the king until he was asked to convert to Arianism. Victorian refused and was tortured and killed.

The Roman Martyrology states that four other wealthy merchants were martyred on the same day as Victorian's death. Two were named Frumentius; they were merchants of Carthage. The other two were brothers of the city of Aquae Regiae, Byzacena, who were killed at Tabaia.
