= Leonides of Alexandria =

Christian martyr and father of Origen (died 202)

Saint Leonides
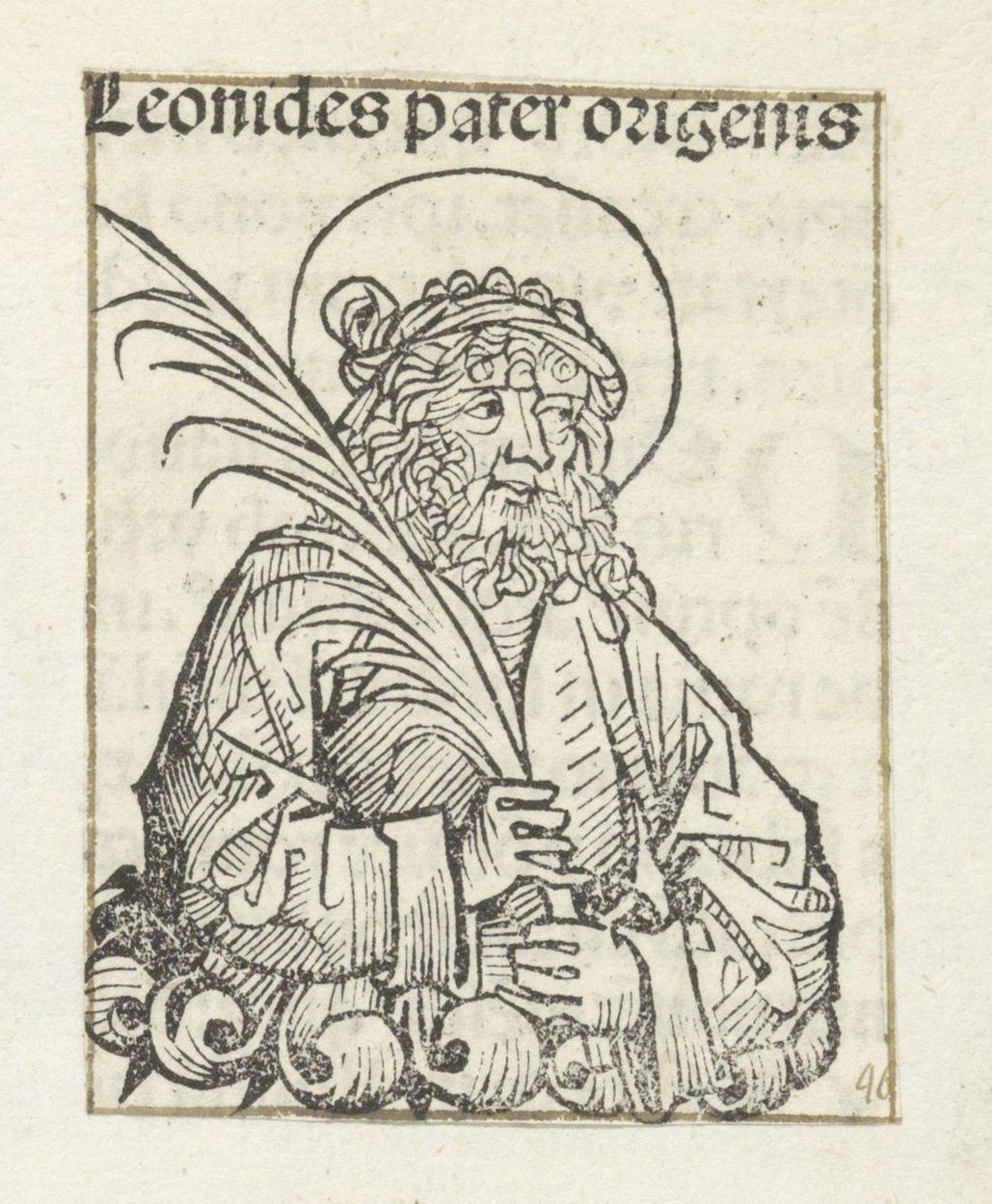

Martyr
- Died: 202; Alexandria, Province of Egypt, Roman Empire
- Venerated in: Roman Catholic Church; Eastern Orthodox Church
- Canonized: Pre-congregation
- Feast: 22 April
- Patronage: Large families

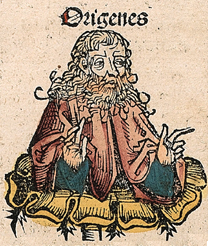
Origen, son of Leonides

Leonides of Alexandria (Greek: Λεωνίδης) was a Greek early Christian martyr who lived in the second and early third centuries AD.

== Biography ==
According to the Christian historian Eusebius, Leonides' son was the early Church father Origen. Eusebius also says that he was of Greek nationality. In the same passage Eusebius tells us that Leonides was martyred during the persecution of the Roman emperor Septimius Severus in the year 202 AD. Condemned to death by the Egyptian prefect Lactus, he was beheaded, and his property seized.

== Family ==
The name of Leonides' wife is unknown, but she bore at least six children after Origen.

Porphyry, a Neoplatonist, claims Origen's parents were pagans.

Leonides catechized his children well. Origen attempted to follow his father in martyrdom, but he was detained by his mother - it is said that she hid his clothes so that Origen could not leave the house.

== Feast ==
The Catholic feast of Leonides is celebrated on April 22.

== See also ==
- Chronological list of saints in the 3rd century
