= Palmatius =

Christian saint

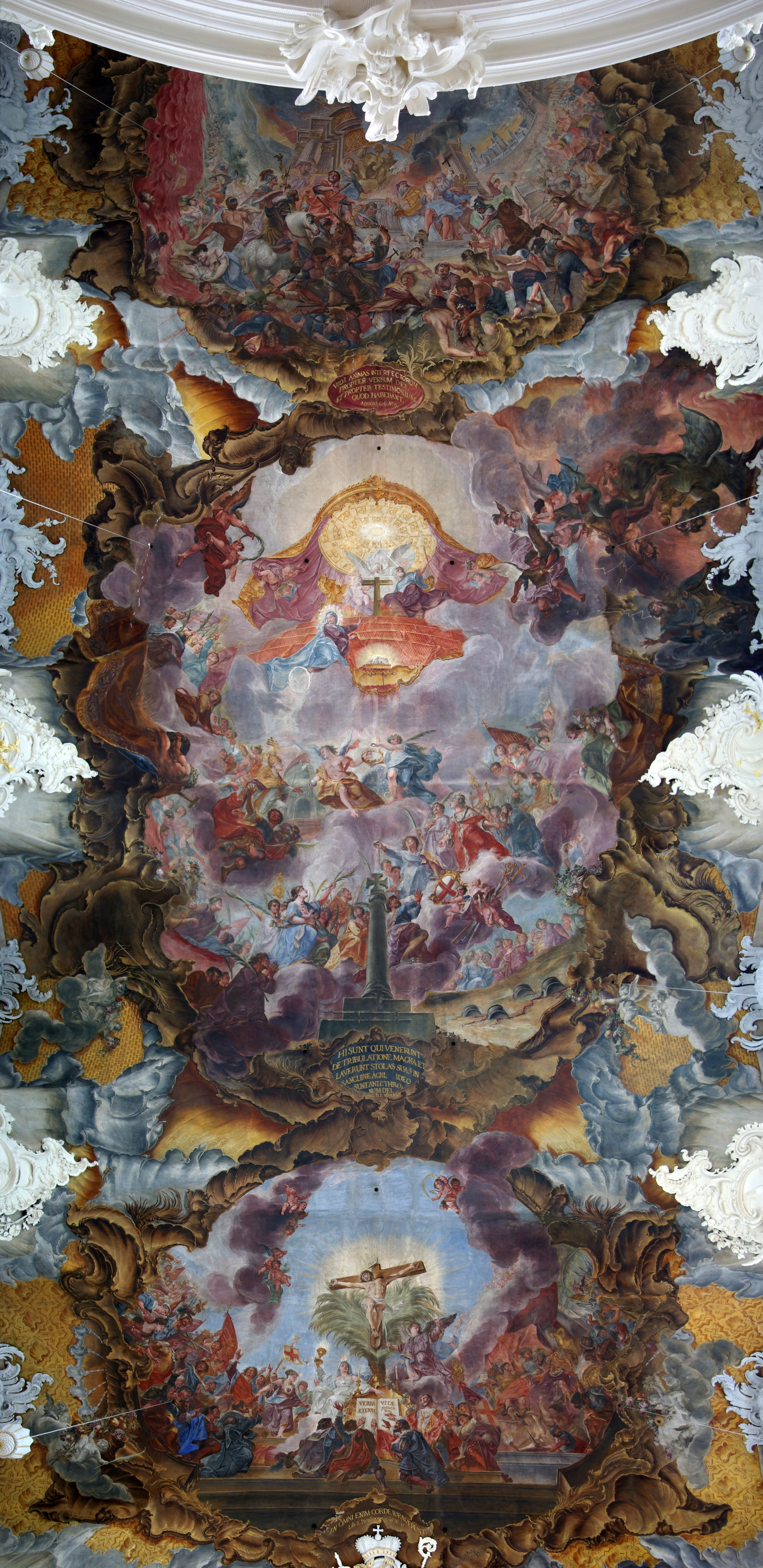
- Baroque fresco depicting the Martyrs of Trier, of which Palmatius was part
- Died: 287; Trier
- Venerated in: Roman Catholic Church; Eastern Orthodox Church
- Feast: May 10
- Attributes: Soldier, Martyr

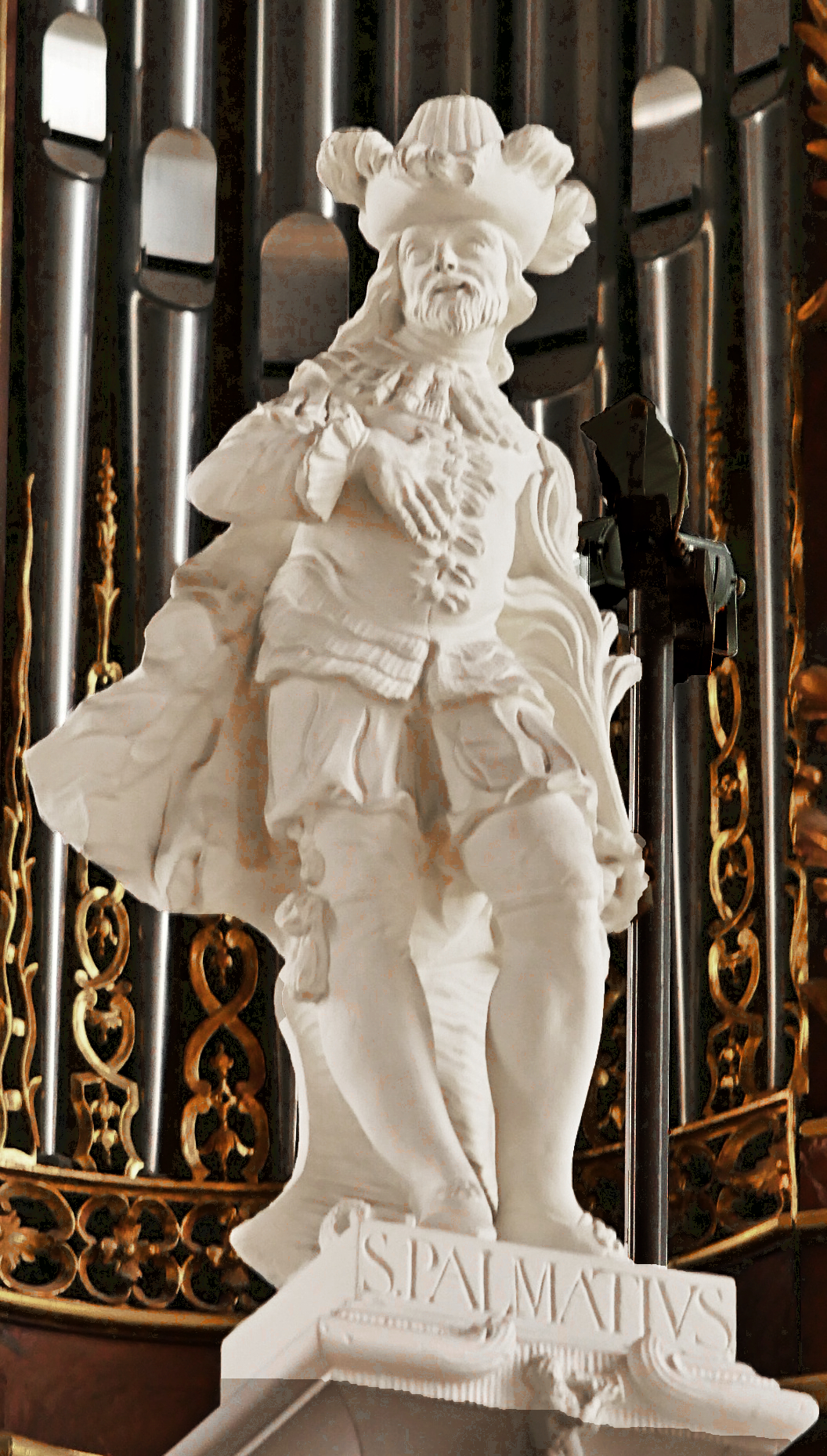
Statue of Saint Palmatius Basilica of St. Paulinus, Trier

Palmatius was a Christian saint martyred with 11 companions in Trier in around 287. They were among many killed under the Emperor Maximian by Rictius Varus, the vicarius in Roman Gaul.

His feast day is May 10.

== Martyrs of Trier ==
The 11 companions of Palmatius, who were martyred with him in Trier, are collectively known as the Martyrs of Trier. Their feast day is October 6, separate from the feast day of Palmatius.
