= Alexander of Comana =

Bishop of Comana in Pontus(died c. 251)

Saint Alexander of Comana
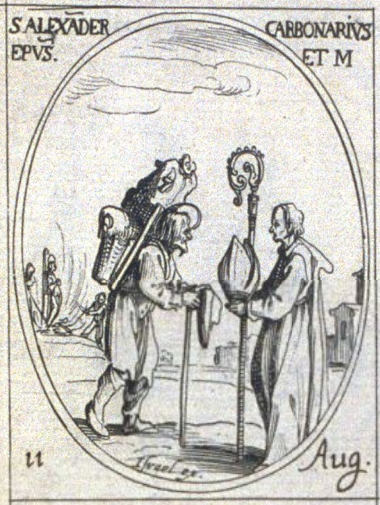
- An engraving of Saint Alexander of Comana by Jacques Callot

Bishop and Martyr The Charcoal Burner
- Born: unknown
- Died: c. 250; Comana in Pontus (modern-day Gümenek, Tokat, Turkey)
- Venerated in: Catholic Church; Eastern Orthodox Churches
- Feast: Roman Catholicism 11 August; Maronite Catholicism 12 February; Orthodox 12 August
- Patronage: charcoal burners

Saint Alexander of Comana (Greek: Ἀλέξανδρος Κομάνων); died c. 251, known as Alexander Carbonarius (Greek: Ἀλέξανδρος ὁ Ἀνθρακεὺς), meaning "the charcoal burner", was Bishop of Comana in Pontus. Whether he was the first to occupy that seat is unknown. The saint's curious name comes from the fact that he had, out of humility, taken up the work of burning charcoal, so as to escape worldly honors. He was noted for being exceptionally dirty in consequence.

He was called a philosopher, but it is not certain that the term can be taken literally. His philosophy consisted rather in his preference for heavenly rather than earthly things. The discovery of his virtues was accidental and due to the contempt with which he was widely regarded. St. Gregory Thaumaturgus had been asked to come to Comana to help select a bishop for that place. As he rejected all the candidates someone suggested derisively that he might accept Alexander, the charcoal-burner. Gregory took the suggestion seriously, summoned Alexander, and found that he had to do with a saintly man of great capabilities. Alexander was made bishop of the see, and administered it with wisdom. He was burned to death in the persecution carried out by Decius.

Alexander would have been unknown were it not for a discourse by St. Gregory of Nyssa, on the life of St. Gregory Thaumaturgus, in which the election of Alexander is incidentally described.

His feast day is kept on August 11 by Roman Catholics, and on August 12 among Orthodox Christians.
