= Carpophorus, Exanthus, Cassius, Severinus, Secundus, and Licinius =

Christian martyrs (d. ca. 295 AD)

Saints Carpophorus, Exanthus, Cassius, Severinus, Secundus, and Licinius
- Died: c. 295 AD; Como
- Venerated in: Roman Catholic Church; Eastern Orthodox Church
- Feast: August 7; (Carpophorus, with Fidelis of Como, and Felinus and Gratian) March 13
- Attributes: Military attire

Carpophorus, Exanthus, Cassius, Severinus, Secundus and Licinius (all died c. 295 AD) were Christian soldiers who, according to tradition, were martyred at Como during the reign of Maximian.

== Legends ==
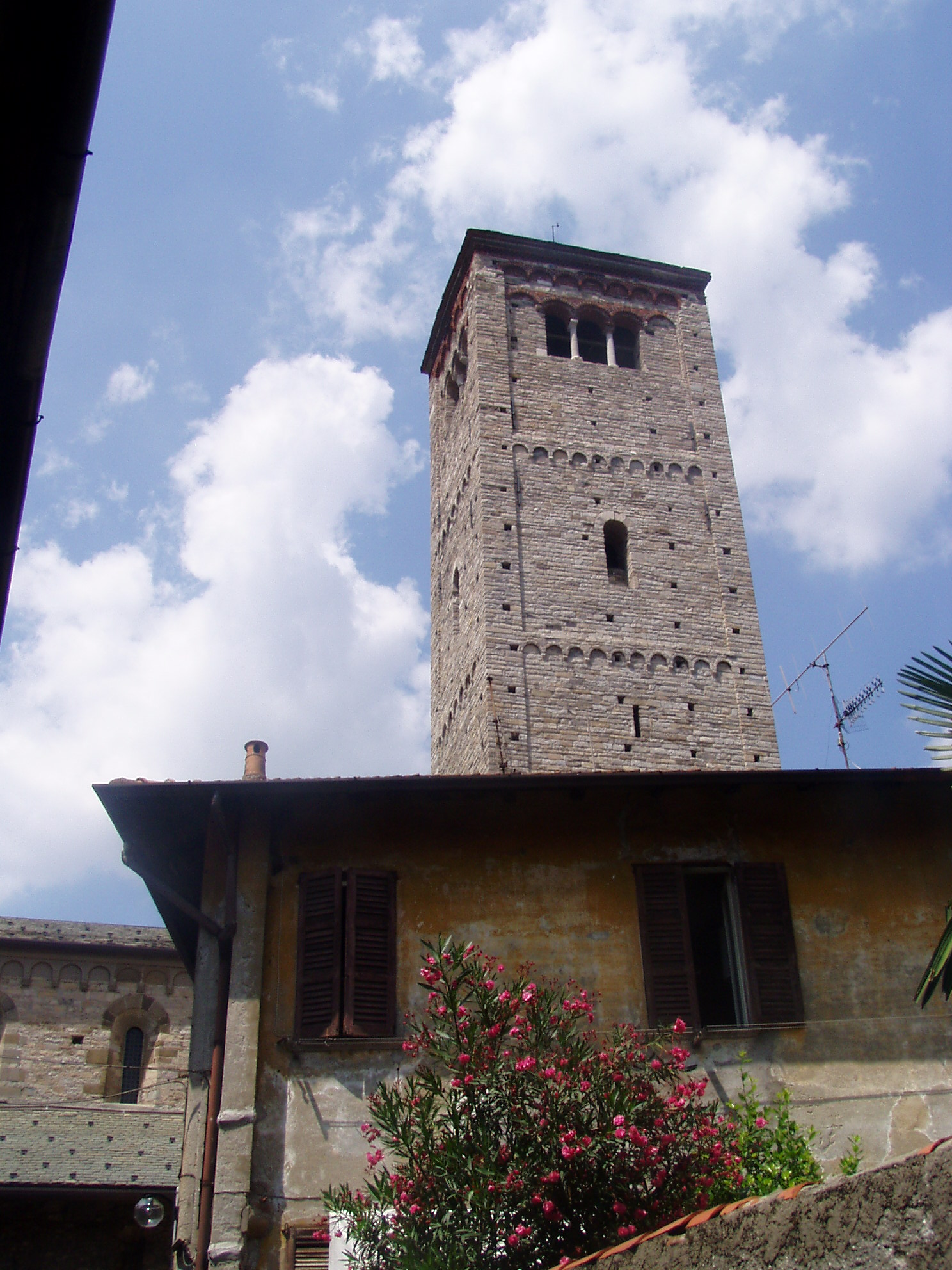
The church of San Carpoforo in Como.

The cult of Fidelis of Como is associated with these saints. Variations on more or less the same legend concern them. The first says that he, with Carpophorus and Exanthus, were Roman soldiers (members of the famed Theban Legion) who deserted during the persecution of Christians by Maximian. They were caught and executed at Como.

The second says that Fidelis was an army officer who was guarding Christian prisoners at Milan, including Saint Alexander of Bergamo. He managed to procure the freedom of five of these prisoners. With Carpophorus and Exanthus, he and these five attempted to make their way to the Alps, but were executed at Como. The martyrdom is considered to have occurred on the north side of Lake Como, near Samolaco.

Their feast day is August 7. The church of San Carpoforo at Como, was, according to tradition, founded reusing a former temple of Mercury to house the remains of Carpophorus and other local martyrs.

Just Carpophorus was often venerated with Fidelis of Como, and both saints were in turn venerated at Arona with two other soldier saints, Felinus and Gratian, on a joint feast day of March 13.
