= Secundian, Marcellian and Verian =

Saints Secundian, Marcellian and Verian
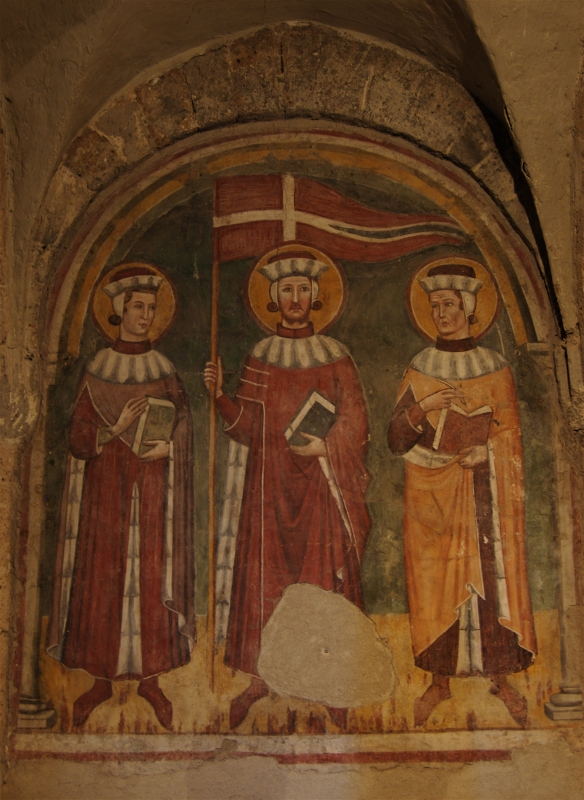
- 14th-century fresco of Secundian, Marcellian and Verian in the basilica of San Pietro, in Tuscania.

Martyrs
- Died: ~250 AD near Civitavecchia or Santa Marinella, Italy
- Venerated in: Roman Catholic Church
- Feast: August 9
- Patronage: Tuscania

Saints Secundian, Marcellian and Verian (also known as Secondianus, Marcellianus, and Verianus) (Italian: Secondino, Marcelliano, e Veriano) are venerated as Christian saints. They were martyred in 250 AD near Civitavecchia or Santa Marinella during the persecutions of Decius. Secundian was a senator or some sort of prominent official; Marcellian and Verian were scholars or students. Their feast day is August 9.

== Narrative ==
A fifteenth century account relates that under Emperor Decius, the three were zealous persecutors of Christians. However, upon reading Virgil's Eclogue 4, they, like Statius in the Divine Comedy, became Christians.

According to one version, they were baptized by a priest named Timotheus (Timothy) and confirmed by Pope Sixtus II. By order of Decius, they were arrested by the prefect Valerian and decapitated at Civitavecchia and then their bodies were thrown into the sea.

In a second account, the place of their martyrdom was appellatur Coloniacum, qui dicitur Colonia ("called Coloniacum, that is to say, Colonia"), which may be Colonia Iulia Castrumnovurn. Their bodies were collected by a man named Deodatus and buried in that place.

According to a third account, their cult was localized in the basilica of San Pietro, Tuscania.

The Acts of Felinus and Gratian were based on those of Secundian and his companions. Sabine Baring-Gould writes that "the so-called Acts of SS. Gratian and Felinus, used as lections in the Arona Passionale, are extracted from the Acts of SS. Florentinus and Companions, martyrs at Perugia commemorated the same day. But these Acts are in their turn not genuine; they are, in fact, the Acts of SS. Secundianus and Comp. (August 9)."

== Sources ==
The names of these saints appear in Jerome's martyrology under August 9. The Codex Epternacense indicates that the place of their death was Tuscia; the Codex Wissemburgense lists the place of death as "Colonia" (not necessarily Cologne); and the Codex Bernense finally specifies the place of death as in Colon(n)i Tusciae via miliario Aureliax XV. One scholar has identified this as Colonia Iulia Castrumnovurn, a town in Tuscia, situated on the Aurelian Way, situated near the present-day Santa Marinella (which is near Civitavecchia).
