= Andrew of Trier =

Roman Catholic saint

Saint Andrew of Trier
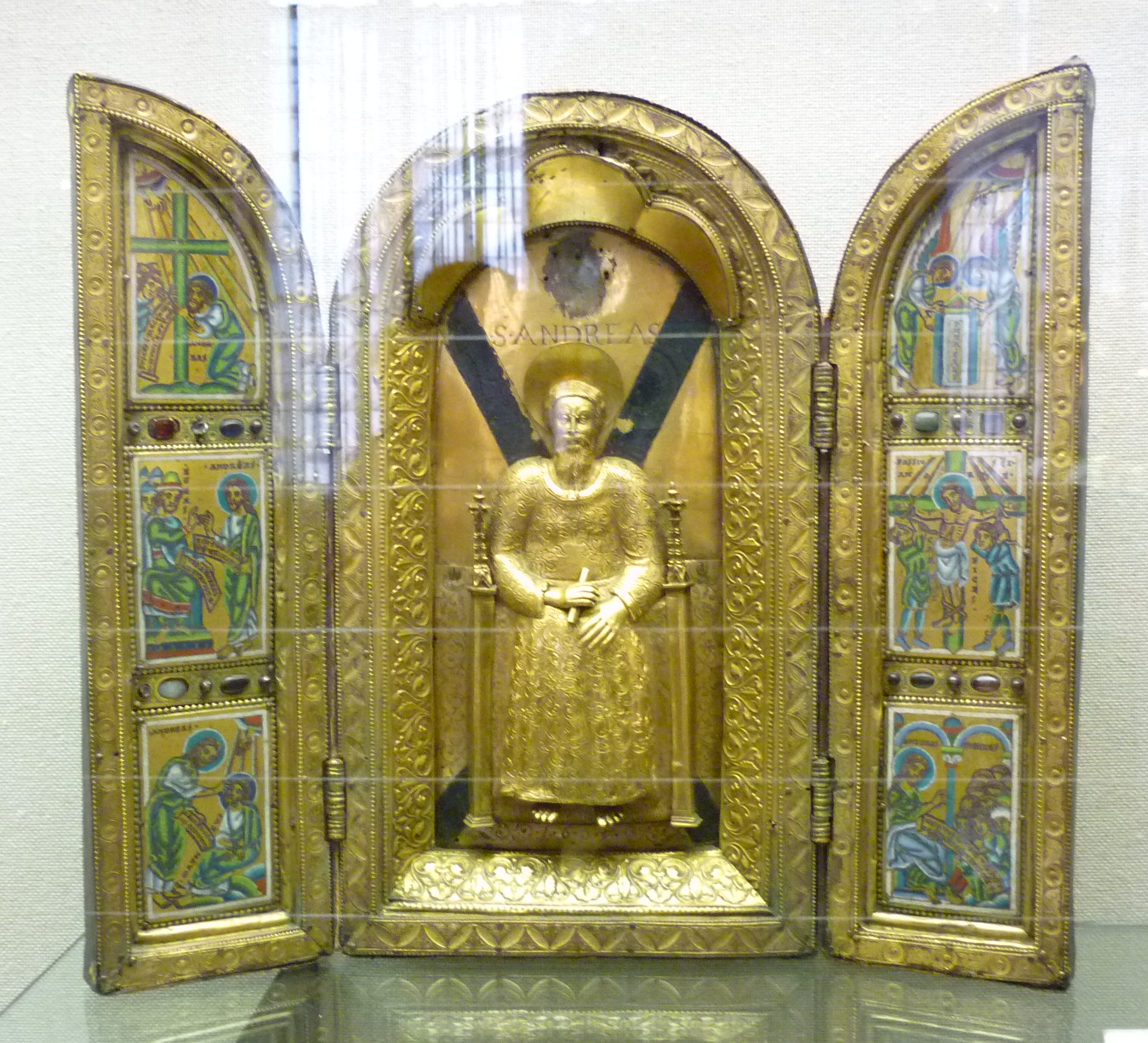
- Triptych of Saint Andrew in Cathedral of Trier (1150)

Bishop of Trier
- Died: 235
- Venerated in: Catholic Church: Anglican Communion; Lutheranism; Church of East; Eastern Orthodox Church
- Canonized: Pre-congregation
- Feast: 13 January

Andrew of Trier is recorded as the twelfth Bishop of Trier. He is a pre-congregational saint, sometimes listed as a martyr. Very little is known of his life, but he is one of a number of bishops of Trier from the time.

He is considered a saint and is venerated in Trier with a feast day on 13 January.
