= Mavilus =

Saint Mavilus

Martyr
- Died: 212; Hadrumetum, Africa Province
- Venerated in: Roman Catholic Church
- Canonized: Pre-congregation
- Feast: 4 January

Mavilus, distinguished as Mavilus of Hadrumetum, was an early Christian martyr during the persecutions of Caracalla. He suffered martyrdom at Hadrumetum, in 212, by being thrown to wild beasts, by order of Governor Scapula.

His feast day is 4 January.
