= Felix of Hadrumetum =

North African Catholic bishop

Saint Felix of Hadrumetum (died c. 434) was a North African Catholic bishop. He was bishop of Hadrumetum, the current Sousse in Tunisia. and died as a martyr during the persecution by the king of the Vandals, Genseric, who was supporter of Arianism. His feast day is February 21.
