= Saint Ischyrion =

Egyptian officer in the Roman army

- Born: Egypt
- Died: c. 250; Alexandria, Egypt
- Canonized: Pre-Congregation
- Feast: 22 December

Saint Ischyrion (or Ischirione; died c. 250) was an Egyptian officer in the Roman army who was martyred in Alexandria during the persecution of the Emperor Decius (r. 249–251). His feast day is 22 December

== Monks of Ramsgate account ==
The monks of St Augustine's Abbey, Ramsgate, gave two accounts in their Book of Saints (1921), which may be for the same person,

Ischyrion and Others (SS.) MM. (June 1)
(3rd cent.) An Egyptian and an officer in the Roman army, commonly reputed to have suffered with five others in the persecution under Diocletian (A.D. 300 about). But the Bollandists and other moderns conjecturally identify him with the Saint Ischyrion (December 22), victim, half a century earlier, of the persecution under Decius.

Ischyrion (St.) M. (Dec. 22)
(3rd century) An Egyptian Christian, employed either in the civil or in the military administration of the province. He gave his life for his Faith in the Decian persecution (A.D. 250).

== Roman Martyrology account ==
The Roman Martyrology of 1846 states under December 22,

At Alexandria, St. Isychyrion, martyr, who, despising the injuries with which they once loaded him, to oblige him to sacrifice to idols, was pierced in the entrails with a sharp stake, and died in this torment, in 253.

== Butler's account ==
The hagiographer Alban Butler (1710–1773) wrote in his Lives of the Fathers, Martyrs, and Other Principal Saints, under December 22,

Saint Ischyrion, M.

A.D. 253

Ischyrion was an inferior officer who attended on a magistrate of a certain city in Egypt, which Saint Dionysius has not named. His master commanded him to offer sacrifice to the idols; and because he refused to commit that sacrilege, reproached him with the most contumelious and threatening speeches. By giving way to his passion and superstition, he at length worked himself up to that degree of frenzy, as to run a stake into the bowels of the meek servant of Christ, who, by his patient constancy attained to the glory of martyrdom.

== Sources ==
- Butler, Alban (1846), The Lives of the Fathers, Martyrs, and Other Principal Saints, D. & J. Sadlier This article incorporates text from this source, which is in the public domain.
- St. Augustine's Abbey, Ramsgate (1921), The Book of saints : a dictionary of servants of God canonized by the Catholic Church, London: A. & C. Black, ltd. This article incorporates text from this source, which is in the public domain.
- The Roman and British Martyrology: Now First Translated, Literally, from the Latin Ed, O'Neill and Duggan, 1846 This article incorporates text from this source, which is in the public domain.
