= Cointha =

Egyptian saint and martyr

Saint Cointha
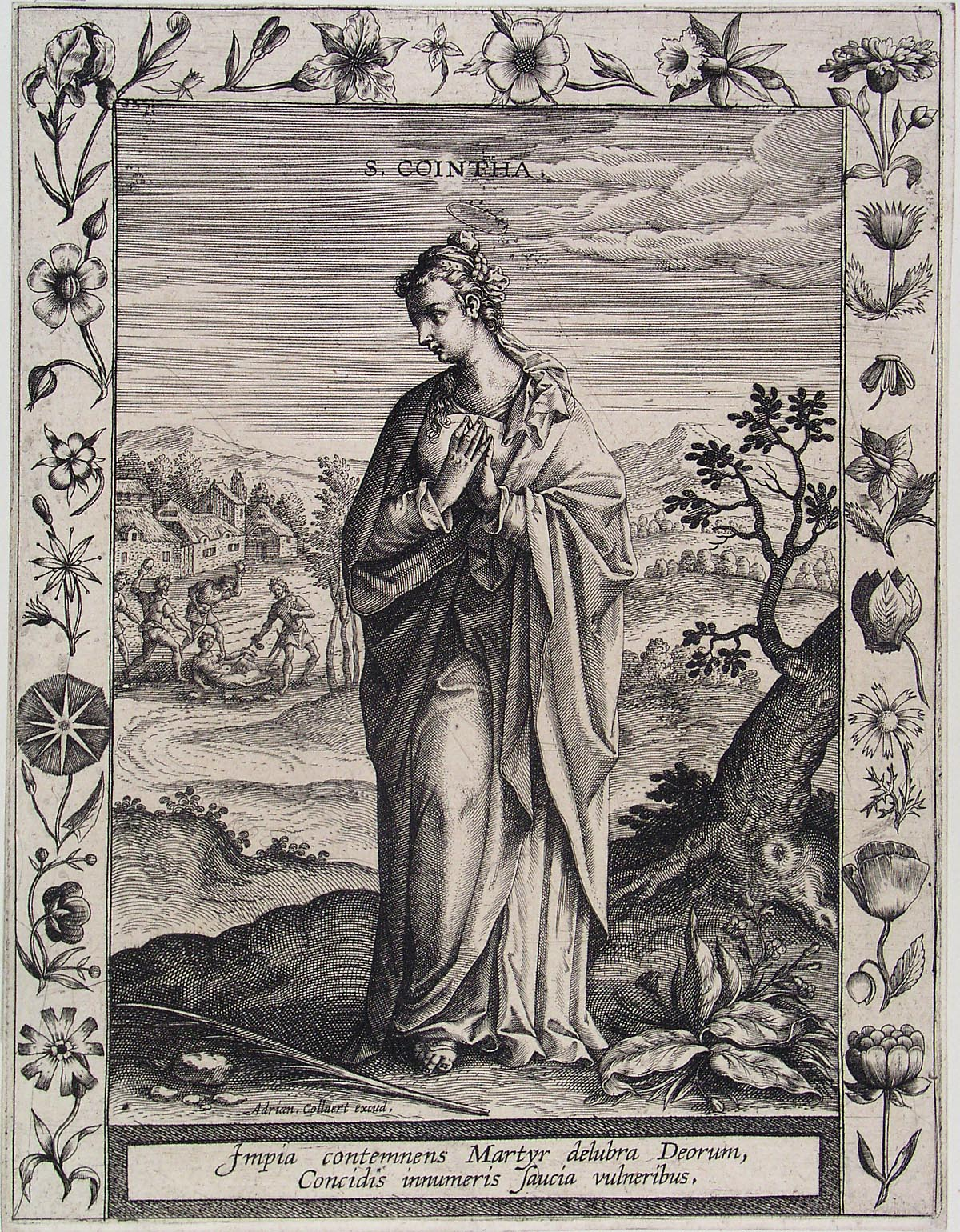

Martyr
- Died: 249; Alexandria, Egypt
- Venerated in: Roman Catholic Church
- Canonized: Pre-congregation
- Feast: 8 February

Cointha, also known as Quinta or "Cynthia", was an Egyptian saint and martyr who suffered martyrdom during the persecutions of Emperor Trajanus Decius. Cointha was martyred by having her feet tied to a horse then being dragged through the streets of Alexandria.
