= Thespesius of Cappadocia =

Saint Thespesius

Martyr
- Died: 230; Cappadocia (modern-day Central Anatolia, Turkey)
- Venerated in: Roman Catholic Church, Eastern Orthodox Church
- Canonized: Pre-congregation
- Feast: 1 June

Thespesius was a Christian martyr, who supposedly died during the reign of Emperor Severus Alexander. His name is Greek for "Wondrous One".
