= Conon of Perga =

Martyr saint of the Roman Empire

Conon of Perga (born in the 3rd century in Nazareth, died about 250 in Magydas, Pamphylia) was a martyr saint of the Roman Empire.

The Orthodox church refers to him as Conon the gardener, and has a feast day for him on March 5. In the Catholic church, Conon's feast day is on February 4. It is possible that these are actually two different persons.

Conon came from a Greek Christian family in Nazareth and who was put to death in the year 250 during the reign of the Emperor Decius, because of his refusal to sacrifice to the pagan gods. He was put to death in Perga, Phrygia or Pisidia, in Asia Minor (modern Turkey). His method of execution was having spikes driven through his feet and then being made to run in front of his own chariot.

Richard Bauckham has suggested Conon to be the last known relative (desposyni) of Jesus Christ, on the basis of this passage from the Martyrdom of Conon: "'I am of the city of Nazareth in Galilee, I am of the family (συγγένεια) of Christ, whose worship I have inherited from my ancestors, and whom I recognize as God over all things.'"

When the Byzantine Emperor Constans II entered the city of Rome through the Porta Appia (the gate by which the Appian Way entered the city of Rome) during his Italian campaign against the Lombards, a stone with an incised cross stood over the gate that had the names of St George and St Conon written at the bottom of it in Greek, with the phrase 'thanks be to God' at the top.

== See also ==
- Christian martyrs
- Desposyni
