= Crescentian =

Saint Crescentian

Martyr
- Died: 130; Sardinia
- Venerated in: Roman Catholic Church; Eastern Orthodox Church
- Canonized: Pre-congregation
- Feast: 31 May

Saint Crescentian (died 130 AD) was a 2nd-century Christian martyr killed at Sassyr, on Sardinia. Saints Gavinus and Crispulus were killed at the same time.

He is venerated in the Eastern Orthodox Church with a feast day of 31 May.
