= Reverianus =

3rd century bishop

Saint Reverianus of Autun
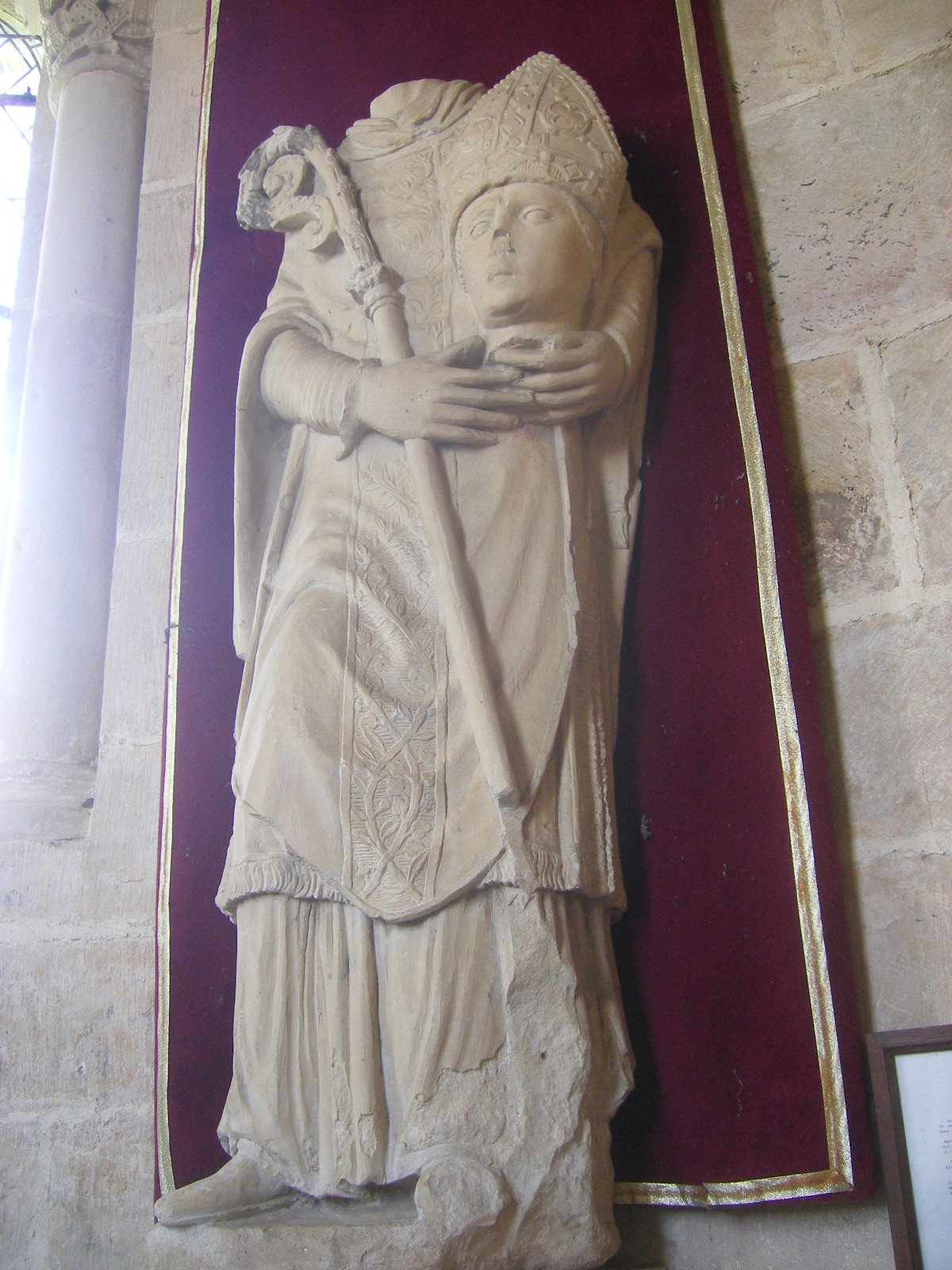
- A statue of St. Reverianus holding his head

Martyr
- Born: Italy
- Died: June 1, 273 AD; Gaul
- Venerated in: Roman Catholic Church
- Major shrine: Villy-le-Moutier (Canton of Nuits-Saint-Georges), France
- Feast: June 1
- Attributes: Bishop's attire, head in his hands

Saint Reverianus of Autun (French: Révérien, Rirand, also Revenerius, Rivianus, Reverentianus, Reveriano, Reverie) (died June 1, 273 AD) was a 3rd-century bishop of Autun and martyr. He is venerated as a saint by the Roman Catholic Church. According to tradition, Reverianus was of Italian origin, he was sent by Pope Felix I to evangelize the Aedui, a Gallic people of Gallia Lugdunensis and is considered the "apostle of the Morvan".

== Life ==
According to Usuard, Reverianus was persecuted during the reign of the Emperor Aurelian. According to tradition, Reverianus' preaching and conversions came to the attention of Emperor Aurelian, who was visiting the province of Sens at the time. Also executed with Reverianus were his companion, Paulus of Autun, along with 10 other followers.

According to one source, "the name [Reverianus] is not mentioned by earlier writers, and the first bishop of Autun seems to have been Reticius, who was present at the Synod of Rome A.D. 313, and at Arles in the following year". Reverianus may have been revered as a bishop because he was the leader of this group of preachers. He may not have been executed at Autun itself but at the site of Saint-Révérien, the town named after him. According to a tradition at Nevers, Reverianus was executed outside of the city walls of that city.

== Veneration ==
In the 4th century, with freedom of worship granted to Christians by the Edict of Milan (313 AD), a monastic cell was built over the graves of these martyrs.

This monastic cell became in 866 the oratory of St. Révérien, which was granted by Charles the Fat to the chapter of Nevers. It had been previously under the jurisdiction of the Benedictines of the Abbey of Saint Martin d'Autun. In 1076, this monastery became affiliated with Abbey of Cluny. In the 13th century, the church of St. Révérien was built according to the Cluniac style.

Another tradition celebrated by the Abbey of Notre-Dame de Nevers held that Reverianus died with his companions near this site, near the spring that still bears his name.

Of his relics, only a piece of Reverianus' head have been preserved. The relic was kept at Villy-le-Moutier (in the Canton of Nuits-Saint-Georges), a village to the east of the city of Beaune. Until 1836, Reverianus' head was carried in procession to the church of Saint-Nicolas de Beaune during times of great drought. Crowds from the city and the surrounding areas would pray for rain.

== Sources ==
- Jacques Baudoin: Grand livre des Saints, culte et iconographie Ed Créer. 2006. 519.p. fiche n°484, p. 419.
- François Adolphe Chauve-Bertrand: L'église romane de Saint Révérien in Bulletin de la Société scientifique et artistique de Clamecy 74e année 3e sem n°26. 1950; p. 88–110 – idem 85e année 3e sem n°36. 1961: Sanctus Reverianus – et n°3 . série 37 de 1962. p. 68–83.
- Monks of St. Augustine’s Abbey, Ramsgate, compilers. The Book of Saints: A Dictionary of Servants of God Canonised by the Catholic Church. 7th ed., A & C Black, 2002. (ISBN 0713653000)
