= Valerius and Rufinus =

Saints Valerius and Rufinus
- Died: 287 AD; Soissons
- Venerated in: Roman Catholic Church
- Feast: June 14

Valerius and Rufinus (died 287 AD) are venerated as Christian saints and martyrs. Their legend states that they were imperial tax collectors in Soissons who were pious Christians. They were ordered to be arrested by Rictius Varus, the praefectus-praetorii in Gaul. The two saints hid themselves (tradition holds in a cave in a forest near Soissons) but were eventually caught, and then tortured and beheaded on the high road leading to Soissons.

Rufinus is one of the 140 Colonnade saints which adorn St. Peter's Square.

== Darenth bowl ==
The Darenth bowl (dedicated to Saint Rufinus of Soissons c.450) was found in an ancient Saxon burial ground (5th century) on the site of the former Darenth Park Hospital, now demolished. The glass bowl was found with 12 Saxon graves as well as a spearhead and brooches. These are now in Dartford Borough Museum.
