= Felinus and Gratian =

Saints and martyrs

Saints Felinus and Gratian
- Died: ~250 AD; Perugia
- Venerated in: Roman Catholic Church, Eastern Orthodox Church
- Major shrine: Santi Martiri Church, Arona
- Feast: 1 June; (Joint local feast day with Carpophorus and Fidelis) 13 March
- Attributes: Military attire
- Patronage: Arona

Saints Felinus and Gratian(us) (sometimes Gratinian[us]) (d. 250 AD) are venerated as martyrs by the Catholic and Eastern Orthodox churches. They are patron saints of Arona, near Milan, where their relics were enshrined.

The city of Arona celebrates two groups of martyrs on 13 March: Felinus and Gratian, as well as Carpophorus and Fidelis. The festival of Tredicino is celebrated on the shores of Lago Maggiore.

== Historicity ==
Baronius inserted the names of Felinus and Gratian names into the Roman Martyrology, quoting as his authority the Acts preserved at Perugia. Sabine Baring-Gould writes, however, that "the so-called Acts of SS. Gratian and Felinus, used as lections in the Arona Passionale, are extracted from the Acts of SS. Florentinus and Companions, martyrs at Perugia commemorated the same day. But these Acts are in their turn not genuine; they are, in fact, the Acts of SS. Secundianus and Comp. (Aug. 9th)."

The cult of Gratian and Felinus, therefore, rests on a shaky historical foundation. The garbling of lives and cults may have been purposeful, consisting of a mere alteration of the names of persons and places so as to make the Acts of Secundianus serve for Felinus and Gratian, and thus in the interests of Perugia.

The oldest document concerning Felinus and Gratian dates from the tenth century. The manuscript is made up of 249 sheets in parchment and is written in Gothic script and in medieval Latin. According to the text, Felinus and Gratian were two soldiers of Perugia, who were converted to Christianity by the bishop of the city. During the persecution of Decius, they were martyred for their faith. Felinus and Gratian have been identified as being identical to two other martyrs: Gratilianus and Felicissima, with "Felinus and Gratian" being a simple misreading for the names of two actual saints

== Carpophorus and Fidelis ==
Legend holds that the associated pair of martyrs, Carpophorus and Fidelis, were members of the Theban Legion, whose relics were transferred to Arona during a time of war between Milan and Como. Both Como and Arona claim the relics of Fidelis. The martyrdom of Fidelis is considered to have occurred on the north side of Lake Como, near Samolaco. His relics are considered to have been carried to Como in 964. In Arona, the presence of the relics of Fidelis and Carpophrous is attested in documents dating back to 1259 and 1321.

Goffredo da Bussero (1220–1289 ca.), discussing a group of martyrs of the Theban Legion killed in Lombard territory, states: sed horum duo corpora ad monasterium de Arona dati sunt. This group has been identified as Carpophorus, Exanthus, Cassius, Severinus, Secundus, and Licinius.

== Veneration ==
In 979, the Count of Seprio, Amitto (Amizzone), captain of Otto I, transferred Felinus' and Gratian's relics, with the permission of the bishop, to Arona, and built a monastery dedicated to them. Amitto's foundation has been interpreted as a form of penance, since his soldiers had set fire to the portico of the basilica of Basilica of Saint Paul Outside the Walls.

Charles Borromeo became abbot commendatario of San Felino e San Graziano abbey in Arona on 20 November 1547. In 1576, Borromeo transferred the relics of Carpophorus and Fidelisto to Milan. Even though their veneration in Arona had been minimal, Borromeo's proposed transfer angered the people of the city. On 13 March as a compromise, Borromeo brought the two left forearms of the saints back to Arona. The city council, which had been pressured by the populace to bring back the relics, decreed that an annual festival should occur on that day. The day has increased in importance in succeeding centuries. The purpose of the festival was extended to include the celebration for the martyrs Felinus and Gratian, thereby unifying their veneration to that of Carpophorus and Fidelis.

Relics of all four saints are conserved in the church of Santi Martiri, also known as San Graziano, in Arona.

There is a statue of Felinus on the South transept spire of the Duomo di Milano.
