= June 13 =

June 13 this year in various calendars
- Saturday, 13 June 2026
Akan	Kurumemene
Armenian	28 Margach 1475
Aztec	Teotleco 14, 12 Ehēcatl
Babylonian	26 Ayaru, 2337 SE
Balinese pawukon	Menga, Pasah, Laba, Umanis, Paniron, Saniscara of Sungsang, Brahma, Nohan, Sri
Bengali	30 Joishtho, BS 1433
Chinese	Yang Earth Horse・Stomach Mansion; Fire Horse Year, Month 4, Day 28 (Mangzhong, 8 days until Xiazhi)
Common Era	13 June 2026 CE
Coptic	6 Paoni, AM 1742
Egyptian	28 Phaophi, 2775 NE
Ethiopian	6 Sanē, 2018 Amätä Məhrät
French Republican	Décade III, Quintidi de Prairial de l'Année 234 de la République
Gregorian	13 June, AD 2026
Hebrew	28 Sivan, AM 5786
Hindu	Kṛttikā・Sukarman; Solar: 30 Jyeṣṭha, 1948 SE; Lunisolar: Trayodaśī, Kṛishna pakṣa of Adhika Jyeṣṭha, 2083 VE; Rāudra・5127 KY・1,872,739
Icelandic	Laugardagur, 22 Skerpla 2026
Islamic	27 Dhu al-Hijjah, AH 1447 (using tabular method)
ISO week date	2026-W24-6
Japanese	28 Uzuki, Reiwa 8 (Bōshu, 8 days until Geshi)
Julian	31 May, AD 2026 (AM 7534)
Julian day	2461205
Korean	28 Baemdal, 4359 DE
Maya	13.0.13.12.2; 15 Zotz, 12 Ik
Roman	Pridie Kalendas Iunias, MMDCCLXXIX AUC
Solar Hijri	23 Khordad, SH 1405
Tibetan	28 sa ga, me pho rta 2153 or 1772 or 1000

<<	June					>>
Su	Mo	Tu	We	Th	Fr	Sa
	1	2	3	4	5	6
7	8	9	10	11	12	13
14	15	16	17	18	19	20
21	22	23	24	25	26	27
28	29	30
2026

June 13 in recent years
2026 (Saturday)
2025 (Friday)
2024 (Thursday)
2023 (Tuesday)
2022 (Monday)
2021 (Sunday)
2020 (Saturday)
2019 (Thursday)
2018 (Wednesday)
2017 (Tuesday)

June 13 is the 164th day of the year (165th in leap years) in the Gregorian calendar; 201 days remain until the end of the year.

== Events ==
=== Pre-1600 ===
- 313 – The decisions of the Edict of Milan, signed by Constantine the Great and co-emperor Valerius Licinius, granting religious freedom throughout the Roman Empire, are published in Nicomedia.
- 1325 – Ibn Battuta begins his travels, leaving his home in Tangiers to travel to Mecca (gone 24 years).
- 1381 – In England, the Peasants' Revolt, led by Wat Tyler, comes to a head, as rebels set fire to the Savoy Palace.
- 1514 – Henry Grace à Dieu, at over 1,000 tons the largest warship in the world at this time, built at the new Woolwich Dockyard in England, is dedicated.
- 1525 – Martin Luther marries Katharina von Bora, against the celibacy rule decreed by the Roman Catholic Church for priests and nuns.

=== 1601–1900 ===
- 1625 – King Charles I of England marries Catholic princess Henrietta Maria of France and Navarre, at Canterbury.
- 1740 – Georgia provincial governor James Oglethorpe begins an unsuccessful attempt to take Spanish Florida during the Siege of St. Augustine.
- 1774 – Rhode Island becomes the first of Britain's North American colonies to ban the importation of slaves.
- 1777 – American Revolutionary War: Gilbert du Motier, Marquis de Lafayette lands near Charleston, South Carolina, in order to help the Continental Congress to train its army.
- 1805 – Lewis and Clark Expedition: Scouting ahead of the expedition, Meriwether Lewis and four companions sight the Great Falls of the Missouri River.
- 1850 – The American League of Colored Laborers, the first African American labor union in the United States, is established in New York City.
- 1855 – Twentieth opera of Giuseppe Verdi, Les vêpres siciliennes ("The Sicilian Vespers"), is premiered in Paris.
- 1878 – Start of the Congress of Berlin in which the major powers of Europe revise the Treaty of San Stefano, signed on March 3 the same year, that Russia had imposed on a defeated Ottoman Empire.
- 1881 – The USS Jeannette is crushed in an Arctic Ocean ice pack.
- 1886 – A fire devastates much of Vancouver, British Columbia.
- 1893 – Grover Cleveland notices a rough spot in his mouth and on July 1 undergoes secret, successful surgery to remove a large, cancerous portion of his jaw; the operation was not revealed to the public until 1917, nine years after the president's death.
- 1895 – Émile Levassor wins the world's first real automobile race. Levassor completed the 732-mile course, from Paris to Bordeaux and back, in just under 49 hours, at a then-impressive speed of about fifteen miles per hour (24 km/h).
- 1898 – Yukon Territory is formed, with Dawson chosen as its capital.

=== 1901–present ===
- 1907 – The Workers' Federation of Chile declares a general strike in solidarity with a rail workers' strike.
- 1917 – World War I: The deadliest German air raid on London of the war is carried out by Gotha G.IV bombers and results in 162 deaths, including 46 children, and 432 injuries.
- 1927 – Aviator Charles Lindbergh receives a ticker tape parade up 5th Avenue in New York City.
- 1944 – World War II: The Battle of Villers-Bocage: German tank ace Michael Wittmann ambushes elements of the British 7th Armoured Division, destroying up to fourteen tanks, fifteen personnel carriers and two anti-tank guns in a Tiger I tank.
- 1944 – World War II: German combat elements, reinforced by the 17th SS Panzergrenadier Division, launch a counterattack on American forces near Carentan.
- 1944 – World War II: Germany launches the first V1 Flying Bomb attack on England. Only four of the eleven bombs strike their targets.
- 1952 – Catalina affair: A Swedish Douglas DC-3 is shot down by a Soviet MiG-15 fighter.
- 1956 – Spanish football club Real Madrid CF wins the inaugural European Cup, UEFA's premier club competition, by winning 4–3 against French club Stade de Reims in the final.
- 1966 – The United States Supreme Court rules in Miranda v. Arizona that the police must inform suspects of their Fifth Amendment rights before questioning them (colloquially known as "Mirandizing").
- 1967 – U.S. President Lyndon B. Johnson nominates Solicitor-General Thurgood Marshall to become the first black justice on the U.S. Supreme Court.
- 1971 – Vietnam War: The New York Times begins publication of the Pentagon Papers.
- 1973 – In a game versus the Philadelphia Phillies at Veterans Stadium, Los Angeles Dodgers teammates Steve Garvey, Davey Lopes, Ron Cey and Bill Russell play together as an infield for the first time, going on to set the Major League Baseball record of staying together for 8 1/2 years.
- 1977 – Convicted Martin Luther King Jr. assassin James Earl Ray is recaptured after escaping from prison three days before.
- 1981 – At the Trooping the Colour ceremony in London, a teenager, Marcus Sarjeant, fires six blank shots at Queen Elizabeth II.
- 1982 – Fahd becomes King of Saudi Arabia upon the death of his brother, Khalid.
- 1982 – Battles of Tumbledown and Wireless Ridge, during the Falklands War.
- 1983 – Pioneer 10 becomes the first man-made object to leave the central Solar System when it passes beyond the orbit of Neptune.
- 1990 – First day of the June 1990 Mineriad in Romania. At least 240 strikers and students are arrested or killed in the chaos ensuing from the first post-Ceaușescu elections.
- 1994 – A jury in Anchorage, Alaska, blames recklessness by Exxon and Captain Joseph Hazelwood for the Exxon Valdez disaster, allowing victims of the oil spill to seek $15 billion in damages.
- 1996 – The Montana Freemen surrender after an 81-day standoff with FBI agents.
- 1996 – Garuda Indonesia flight 865 crashes during takeoff from Fukuoka Airport, killing three people and injuring 170.
- 1997 – A jury sentences Timothy McVeigh to death for his part in the 1995 Oklahoma City bombing.
- 1997 – The Uphaar Cinema Fire takes place at Green Park, Delhi, resulting in the deaths of 59 people and seriously injuring 103 others.
- 1999 – BMW win 1999 24 Hours of Le Mans.
- 2000 – President Kim Dae-jung of South Korea meets Kim Jong-il, leader of North Korea, for the beginning of the first ever inter-Korea summit, in the northern capital of Pyongyang.
- 2000 – Italy pardons Mehmet Ali Ağca, the Turkish gunman who tried to kill Pope John Paul II in 1981.
- 2002 – The United States withdraws from the Anti-Ballistic Missile Treaty.
- 2005 – The jury acquits pop singer Michael Jackson of all charges for allegedly sexually abusing a child in 2003.
- 2007 – The Al Askari Mosque is bombed for a second time.
- 2010 – A capsule of the Japanese spacecraft Hayabusa, containing particles of the asteroid 25143 Itokawa, returns to Earth by landing in the Australian Outback.
- 2012 – A series of bombings across Iraq, including Baghdad, Hillah and Kirkuk, kills at least 93 people and wounds over 300 others.
- 2018 – Volkswagen is fined one billion euros over the emissions scandal.
- 2021 – A gas explosion in Zhangwan district of Shiyan city, in Hubei province of China, kills at least 12 people and wounds over 138 others.
- 2023 – At least 100 people are killed when a wedding boat capsizes on the Niger River in Kwara State, Nigeria.
- 2023 – Three people are killed and another three injured in an early morning stabbing and van ramming attack in Nottingham, England.
- 2025 – Israel initiates air strikes against Iran, initiating the Twelve Day War.

== Births ==
=== Pre-1600 ===
- AD 40 – Gnaeus Julius Agricola, Roman general (died 93)
- 823 – Charles the Bald, Holy Roman Emperor (died 877)
- 839 – Charles the Fat, Holy Roman Emperor (died 888)
- 1367 – Taejong of Joseon, third monarch of the Joseon dynasty of Korea (died 1422)
- 1500 – Ernest of Bavaria, pledge lord of the County of Glatz (died 1560)
- 1508 – Alessandro Piccolomini, Italian astronomer and philosopher (died 1579)
- 1539 – Jost Amman, Swiss printmaker (died 1591)
- 1555 – Giovanni Antonio Magini, Italian mathematician, cartographer and astronomer (died 1617)
- 1580 – Willebrord Snell, Dutch astronomer and mathematician (died 1626)
- 1595 – Jan Marek Marci, Czech medical doctor and scientist (died 1667)

=== 1601–1900 ===
- 1617 – Sir Vincent Corbet, 1st Baronet, English politician (died 1656)
- 1649 – Adrien Baillet, French scholar and critic (died 1706)
- 1711 – Sir Richard Glyn, 1st Baronet, of Ewell, English banker and politician, Lord Mayor of London (died 1773)
- 1752 – Frances Burney, English novelist and playwright (died 1840)
- 1761 – Antonín Vranický, Czech violinist and composer (died 1820)
- 1763 – José Bonifácio de Andrada, Brazilian poet, academic, and politician (died 1838)
- 1773 – Thomas Young, English physicist and physiologist (died 1829)
- 1775 – Antoni Radziwiłł, Polish-Lithuanian composer and politician (died 1833)
- 1786 – Winfield Scott, American general (died 1866)
- 1790 – José Antonio Páez, Venezuelan general and politician, President of Venezuela (died 1873)
- 1809 – Heinrich Hoffmann, German psychiatrist and author (died 1894)
- 1822 – Carl Schmidt, Latvian-German chemist and academic (died 1894)
- 1827 – Alberto Henschel, German-Brazilian photographer and businessman (died 1882)
- 1831 – James Clerk Maxwell, Scottish physicist and mathematician (died 1879)
- 1840 – Augusta Lundin, the first international Swedish fashion designer (died 1919)
- 1854 – Charles Algernon Parsons, English engineer, founded C. A. Parsons and Company (died 1931)
- 1863 – Lucy, Lady Duff-Gordon, English fashion designer (died 1935)
- 1864 – Rudolf Kjellén, Swedish political scientist and academic (died 1922)
- 1864 – Dwight B. Waldo, American historian and academic (died 1939)
- 1865 – Karl Blossfeldt, German photographer (died 1932)
- 1865 – W. B. Yeats, Irish poet and playwright, Nobel Prize laureate (died 1939)
- 1868 – Wallace Clement Sabine, American physicist and academic (died 1919)
- 1870 – Jules Bordet, Belgian immunologist and microbiologist, Nobel Prize laureate (died 1961)
- 1872 – Thomas N. Heffron, American actor, director, and screenwriter (died 1951)
- 1873 – Karin Swanström, Swedish actress, director, and producer (died 1942)
- 1875 – Paul Neumann, Austrian swimmer and medical doctor (died 1932)
- 1876 – William Sealy Gosset, English chemist and statistician (died 1937)
- 1879 – Heinrich Gutkin, Estonian businessman and politician (died 1941)
- 1879 – Charalambos Tseroulis, Greek general and politician, Greek Minister for Military Affairs (died 1929)
- 1884 – Leon Chwistek, Polish painter, philosopher, and mathematician (died 1944)
- 1884 – Étienne Gilson, French philosopher and academic (died 1978)
- 1885 – Henry George Lamond, Australian farmer and author (died 1969)
- 1887 – André François-Poncet, French politician and diplomat (died 1978)
- 1887 – Bruno Frank, German-American author, poet, and playwright (died 1945)
- 1888 – Fernando Pessoa, Portuguese poet and critic (died 1935)
- 1889 – Gao Qifeng, Chinese painter (died 1933)
- 1892 – Basil Rathbone, South African-born British-American actor (died 1967)
- 1893 – Alan Arnold Griffith, English engineer (died 1963)
- 1893 – Dorothy L. Sayers, English author and poet (died 1957)
- 1894 – Leo Kanner, Ukrainian-American psychiatrist and medical doctor (died 1981)
- 1894 – Jacques Henri Lartigue, French photographer and painter (died 1986)
- 1897 – Paavo Nurmi, Finnish runner and coach (died 1973)
- 1899 – Carlos Chávez, Mexican composer, conductor, and journalist, founded the Mexican Symphonic Orchestra (died 1978)
- 1900 – Ian Hunter, British Cape Colony actor of stage and film (died 1975)

=== 1901–present ===
- 1901 – Tage Erlander, Swedish lieutenant and politician, 25th Prime Minister of Sweden (died 1985)
- 1902 – Carolyn Eisele, American mathematician and historian (died 2000)
- 1903 – Willard Harrison Bennett, American physicist and chemist (died 1987)
- 1905 – Doc Cheatham, American jazz trumpeter (died 1997)
- 1905 – James T. Rutnam, Sri Lankan historian and author (died 1988)
- 1906 – Bruno de Finetti, Austrian-Italian mathematician and statistician (died 1985)
- 1909 – E. M. S. Namboodiripad, Indian theorist and politician, 1st Chief Minister of Kerala (died 1998)
- 1910 – Gonzalo Torrente Ballester, Spanish journalist, author, and playwright (died 1999)
- 1910 – Mary Wickes, American actress (died 1995)
- 1910 – Mary Whitehouse, English activist, founded the National Viewers' and Listeners' Association (died 2001)
- 1911 – Luis Walter Alvarez, American physicist and academic, Nobel Prize laureate (died 1988)
- 1911 – Maurice Copeland, American actor (died 1985)
- 1911 – Erwin Wilhelm Müller, German physicist and academic (died 1977)
- 1912 – Hector de Saint-Denys Garneau, Canadian poet and painter (died 1943)
- 1913 – Ralph Edwards, American radio and television host (died 2005)
- 1913 – Yitzhak Pundak, Israeli general, diplomat and politician (died 2017)
- 1914 – Frederic Franklin, English-American ballet dancer and director (died 2013)
- 1915 – Don Budge, American tennis player and coach (died 2000)
- 1916 – Wu Zhengyi, Chinese botanist and academic (died 2013)
- 1917 – Teddy Turner, English actor (died 1992)
- 1917 – Augusto Roa Bastos, Paraguayan novelist (died 2005)
- 1918 – Ben Johnson, American actor and stuntman (died 1996)
- 1918 – Helmut Lent, German soldier and pilot (died 1944)
- 1918 – Percy Rodriguez, Canadian-American actor (died 2007)
- 1920 – Rolf Huisgen, German chemist and academic (died 2020)
- 1920 – Iosif Vorovich, Russian mathematician and engineer (died 2001)
- 1921 – Lennart Strand, Swedish runner (died 2004)
- 1922 – Etienne Leroux, South African author (died 1989)
- 1923 – Lloyd Conover, American chemist and inventor (died 2017)
- 1925 – Kristine Miller, American actress (died 2015)
- 1926 – Jérôme Lejeune, French pediatrician and geneticist (died 1994)
- 1926 – Paul Lynde, American actor and comedian (died 1982)
- 1927 – Slim Dusty, Australian singer-songwriter and guitarist (died 2003)
- 1928 – Giacomo Biffi, Italian cardinal (died 2015)
- 1928 – Renée Morisset, Canadian pianist (died 2009)
- 1928 – John Forbes Nash, Jr., American mathematician and academic, Nobel Prize laureate (died 2015)
- 1929 – Alan Civil, British French horn player (died 1989)
- 1929 – Ralph McQuarrie, American illustrator (died 2012)
- 1929 – Robert W. Scott, American farmer and politician, 67th Governor of North Carolina (died 2009)
- 1930 – Gotthard Graubner, German painter and educator (died 2013)
- 1930 – Ryszard Kukliński, Polish colonel and spy (died 2004)
- 1930 – Paul Veyne, French archaeologist, historian, and academic (died 2022)
- 1931 – Nora Kovach, Hungarian-American ballerina (died 2009)
- 1931 – Reed Scowen, Canadian politician (died 2020)
- 1931 – Irvin D. Yalom, American psychotherapist and academic
- 1932 – Raymond Jolliffe, 5th Baron Hylton, English politician
- 1932 – Bob McGrath, American singer and actor (died 2022)
- 1932 – Billy Williams, American baseball player and coach (died 2013)
- 1933 – Tom King, Baron King of Bridgwater, English soldier and politician, Secretary of State for Defence
- 1933 – Norman Lloyd-Edwards, Welsh lawyer and politician, Lord Lieutenant of South Glamorgan
- 1934 – Bill Blakeley, American basketball player and coach (died 2010)
- 1934 – Lucjan Brychczy, Polish footballer and coach (died 2024)
- 1934 – Manuel Clouthier, Mexican businessman and politician (died 1989)
- 1934 – James Anthony Griffin, American bishop
- 1934 – Uriel Jones, American drummer (died 2009)
- 1934 – Leonard Kleinrock, American computer scientist and engineer
- 1935 – Christo, Bulgarian-French sculptor and painter (died 2020)
- 1935 – Jeanne-Claude, Moroccan sculptor and painter (died 2009)
- 1935 – Samak Sundaravej, Thai politician, 25th Prime Minister of Thailand (died 2009)
- 1936 – Peter H. Raven, American botanist and environmentalist (died 2026)
- 1937 – Eleanor Holmes Norton, American lawyer and politician
- 1937 – Erich Ribbeck, German footballer and manager
- 1937 – Andreas Whittam Smith, English journalist and publisher, co-founded The Independent (died 2025)
- 1940 – Bobby Freeman, American singer-songwriter, pianist, and producer (died 2017)
- 1940 – Gil Gomes, Brazilian journalist and lawyer (died 2018)
- 1940 – Dallas Long, American shot putter and medical doctor (died 2024)
- 1941 – Marcel Lachemann, American baseball player, coach and manager
- 1941 – Serge Lemoyne, Canadian painter (died 1998)
- 1941 – Marv Tarplin, American guitarist and songwriter (died 2011)
- 1942 – Yiannis Boutaris, Greek businessman and politician, Mayor of Thessaloniki (died 2024)
- 1943 – Harry Collins, English sociologist, author and academic
- 1943 – Malcolm McDowell, English actor and producer
- 1943 – Jim Guy Tucker, American lawyer and politician, 43rd Governor of Arkansas (died 2025)
- 1944 – Christine Beasley, English nursing administrator
- 1944 – David Curry, English journalist and politician, Secretary of State for Communities and Local Government
- 1944 – Ban Ki-moon, South Korean politician and diplomat, 8th Secretary-General of the United Nations
- 1945 – Whitley Strieber, American author
- 1946 – Sher Bahadur Deuba, Nepalese politician, 32nd Prime Minister of Nepal
- 1946 – Paul L. Modrich, American biochemist and academic, Nobel Prize laureate
- 1946 – Gabriel of Komana, Belgian-Dutch archbishop (died 2013)
- 1947 – Jerry Nadler, American attorney and politician
- 1948 – Garnet Bailey, Canadian-American ice hockey player and scout (died 2001)
- 1948 – Joe Roth, American director and producer, co-founded Morgan Creek Productions
- 1949 – Ann Druyan, American popular science writer
- 1949 – Dennis Locorriere, American singer and musician (died 2026)
- 1949 – Ulla Schmidt, German educator and politician, German Federal Minister of Health
- 1949 – Red Symons, English-Australian musician, television, and radio personality
- 1950 – Nick Brown, English politician, Minister of Agriculture, Fisheries and Food
- 1950 – Gerd Zewe, German footballer and manager
- 1951 – Howard Leese, American guitarist and producer
- 1951 – Richard Thomas, American actor, director, and producer
- 1951 – Stellan Skarsgård, Swedish actor
- 1952 – Jean-Marie Dedecker, Belgian martial artist and politician
- 1953 – Tim Allen, American actor, comedian, and producer
- 1954 – Andrzej Lepper, Polish politician, Deputy Prime Minister of the Republic of Poland (died 2011)
- 1954 – Ngozi Okonjo-Iweala, Nigerian economist and politician, Minister of Foreign Affairs for Nigeria
- 1955 – Alan Hansen, Scottish footballer and sportscaster
- 1955 – Leah Ward Sears, German-American lawyer and jurist
- 1956 – Blair Chapman, Canadian ice hockey player
- 1956 – Sal Paolantonio, American lieutenant and journalist
- 1957 – Ron Areshenkoff, Canadian ice hockey player (died 2019)
- 1957 – Roy Cooper, American lawyer and politician, 75th Governor of North Carolina
- 1957 – Bruce Flowers, American basketball player
- 1957 – Andrzej Morozowski, Polish journalist and author
- 1957 – Dicky Thompson, American golfer
- 1959 – Boyko Borissov, Bulgarian footballer and politician, 50th Prime Minister of Bulgaria
- 1959 – Maurice G. Dantec, French-born Canadian science fiction writer (died 2016)
- 1959 – Steve Georganas, Australian politician
- 1959 – Klaus Iohannis, Romanian educator and politician, 5th President of Romania
- 1960 – Jacques Rougeau, Canadian wrestler
- 1960 – Doug Crossman, Canadian ice hockey player
- 1962 – Davey Hamilton, American race car driver
- 1962 – Glenn Michibata, Canadian-American tennis player and coach
- 1962 – Ally Sheedy, American actress and author
- 1962 – Hannah Storm, American journalist and author
- 1963 – Bettina Bunge, Swiss-German tennis player
- 1963 – Sarah Connolly, English soprano and actress
- 1963 – Audrey Niffenegger, American author and academic
- 1964 – Christian Wilhelm Berger, Romanian organist, composer and educator
- 1964 – Kathy Burke, English actress, director and playwright
- 1964 – Piyush Goyal, Indian politician, Minister of Railways
- 1964 – Šarūnas Marčiulionis, Lithuanian basketball player
- 1965 – Sunny Balwani, Pakistani-American businessman and criminal
- 1965 – Infanta Cristina Federica of Spain
- 1965 – Vassilis Karapialis, Greek footballer
- 1965 – Lukas Ligeti, Austrian-American drummer and composer
- 1965 – Maninder Singh, Indian cricketer
- 1966 – Henry Bond, English photographer and curator
- 1966 – Grigori Perelman, Russian mathematician
- 1966 – Naoki Hattori, Japanese race car driver
- 1967 – Taşkın Aksoy, German-Turkish footballer and manager
- 1968 – Fabio Baldato, Italian cyclist
- 1968 – Peter DeBoer, Canadian ice hockey player and coach
- 1968 – Darren Dreger, Canadian sportscaster
- 1968 – David Gray, English-Welsh singer-songwriter, guitarist and producer
- 1968 – Denise Pearson, English singer-songwriter
- 1968 – Marcel Theroux, Ugandan-English journalist and author
- 1969 – Cayetana Guillén Cuervo, Spanish actress, director and screenwriter
- 1969 – Virginie Despentes, French author, screenwriter and director
- 1969 – Laura Kightlinger, American actress, comedian, producer and screenwriter
- 1969 – Svetlana Krivelyova, Russian shot putter
- 1969 – Søren Rasted, Danish singer-songwriter, guitarist and producer
- 1970 – Chris Cairns, New Zealand cricketer
- 1970 – Rivers Cuomo, American rock musician
- 1970 – Shaun Young, Australian cricketer
- 1971 – Nóra Köves, Hungarian tennis player
- 1972 – Natalie MacMaster, Canadian fiddler
- 1972 – Maria Minakowska, Polish philosopher, historian, genealogist
- 1973 – Sam Adams, American football player
- 1973 – Tanner Foust, American race car driver and television host
- 1973 – Mattias Hellberg, Swedish singer-songwriter
- 1973 – Stuart Karppinen, Australian cricketer and coach
- 1973 – Ville Laihiala, Finnish singer-songwriter and guitarist
- 1974 – Valeri Bure, Russian-American ice hockey player
- 1974 – Steve-O, American stunt performer
- 1975 – Ante Covic, Australian footballer
- 1975 – Jeff Davis, American screenwriter and producer
- 1975 – Jennifer Nicole Lee, American model, actress and author
- 1975 – Jaan Pehk, Estonian singer-songwriter and guitarist
- 1975 – Riccardo Scimeca, English footballer
- 1976 – Kym Marsh, English singer-songwriter and actress
- 1977 – Romain Mesnil, French pole vaulter
- 1977 – Earthwind Moreland, American football player
- 1977 – Riikka Purra, Finnish politician
- 1978 – Ethan Embry, American actor
- 1978 – Vishwananda, Hindu guru
- 1978 - Brian Dowling, Presenter
- 1979 – Esther Anderson, Australian actress
- 1979 – Nila Håkedal, Norwegian volleyball player
- 1979 – Miguel Pate, American long jumper
- 1979 – Ryan Pickett, American director, producer and screenwriter
- 1980 – Florent Malouda, French footballer
- 1980 – Diego Mendieta, Paraguayan footballer (died 2012)
- 1980 – Jamario Moon, American basketball player
- 1980 – Juan Carlos Navarro, Spanish basketball player
- 1980 – Darius Vassell, English footballer
- 1980 – Markus Winkelhock, German racing driver
- 1981 – Chris Evans, American actor and producer
- 1981 – David Madden, founder and executive director of the National History Bee and the National History Bowl
- 1981 – Radim Vrbata, Czech ice hockey player
- 1982 – Kenenisa Bekele, Ethiopian runner
- 1982 – Krzysztof Bosak, Polish politician
- 1982 – Nate Jones, American football player
- 1983 – Steve Novak, American basketball player
- 1983 – Jason Spezza, Canadian ice hockey player
- 1983 – Rachel Taylor, Welsh rugby union player
- 1984 – Nery Castillo, Mexican-Uruguayan footballer
- 1984 – Kaori Icho, Japanese wrestler
- 1984 – Antje Möldner-Schmidt, German runner
- 1984 – Luke James, American singer and actor
- 1985 – Filipe Albuquerque, Portuguese racing driver
- 1985 – Silvio Bankert, German footballer
- 1985 – Pedro Strop, Dominican baseball player
- 1985 – Danny Syvret, Canadian ice hockey player
- 1986 – Kat Dennings, American actress and comedian
- 1986 – Keisuke Honda, Japanese footballer
- 1986 – Jonathan Lucroy, American baseball catcher
- 1986 – Ashley Olsen, American child actress, fashion designer and businesswoman
- 1986 – Mary-Kate Olsen, American child actress, fashion designer and businesswoman
- 1986 – DJ Snake, French DJ and record producer
- 1986 – Lea Verou, Greek computer scientist and author
- 1986 – Måns Zelmerlöw, Swedish singer
- 1987 – Marko Grgić, Croatian footballer
- 1988 – Gabe Carimi, American football player
- 1988 – Kerttu Niskanen, Finnish cross-country skier
- 1988 – Reece Noi, British actor
- 1988 – Cody Walker, American actor
- 1989 – Ben Barba, Australian rugby league player
- 1989 – James Calado, English racing driver
- 1989 – Ryan McDonagh, American ice hockey player
- 1989 – Daniel Mortimer, Australian rugby league player
- 1989 – Andreas Samaris, Greek footballer
- 1989 – Tommy Searle, English motocross racer
- 1989 – Hassan Whiteside, American basketball player
- 1989 – Erica Wiebe, Canadian wrestler
- 1990 – James McCann, American baseball player
- 1990 – Nicole Riner, Swiss tennis player
- 1990 – Aaron Taylor-Johnson, English actor
- 1991 – Will Claye, American jumper
- 1991 – Ryan Mason, English footballer
- 1991 – Kang Si-ra, South Korean singer
- 1992 – Semi Radradra, Fijian rugby league player
- 1993 – Cansin Köktürk, German politician
- 1993 – Simona Senoner, Italian ski jumper (died 2011)
- 1993 – Denis Ten, Kazakhstani figure skater (died 2018)
- 1994 – Deepika Kumari, Indian archer
- 1994 – Atsuhiro Inukai, Japanese actor
- 1995 – Emily Fanning, New Zealand tennis player
- 1995 – Laura Ucrós, Colombian tennis player
- 1996 – Kocchi no Kento (Born Kento Sugō), Japanese musician
- 2000 – Penny Oleksiak, Canadian swimmer
- 2001 – Bowen Byram, Canadian ice hockey player
- 2001 – Sung Han-bin, South Korean singer
- 2006 – Macklin Celebrini, Canadian ice hockey player
- 2006 – Pablo García, Spanish footballer

== Deaths ==
=== Pre-1600 ===
- 220 – Xiahou Dun, Chinese general
- 976 – Mansur I, Samanid emir
- 995 – Fujiwara no Michikane, Japanese nobleman (born 961)
- 1036 – Ali az-Zahir, Fatimid caliph (born 1005)
- 1231 – Anthony of Padua, Portuguese priest and saint (born 1195)
- 1256 – Tankei, Japanese sculptor (born 1173)
- 1348 – Juan Manuel, Spanish prince (born 1282)
- 1432 – Uko Fockena, Frisian chieftain (born c. 1408)
- 1550 – Veronica Gambara, Italian poet (born 1485)

=== 1601–1900 ===
- 1636 – George Gordon, 1st Marquess of Huntly, Scottish politician (born 1562)
- 1645 – Miyamoto Musashi, Japanese samurai (born 1584)
- 1661 – Henry Carey, 2nd Earl of Monmouth, English politician (born 1595)
- 1665 – Egbert Bartholomeusz Kortenaer, Dutch admiral (born 1604)
- 1762 – Dorothea Erxleben, first German female doctor (born 1715)
- 1784 – Henry Middleton, American farmer and politician, 2nd President of the Continental Congress (born 1717)
- 1846 – Jean-Baptiste Benoît Eyriès, French geographer and author (born 1767)
- 1861 – Henry Gray, English anatomist and surgeon (born 1827)
- 1881 – Joseph Škoda, Czech medical doctor and dermatologist (born 1805)
- 1886 – Ludwig II, king of Bavaria (born 1845)
- 1894 – John Cox Bray, Australian politician, 15th Premier of South Australia (born 1842)
- 1898 – Joseph-Adolphe Chapleau, Canadian lawyer and politician, 5th Premier of Quebec (born 1840)

=== 1901–present ===
- 1904 – Nikiforos Lytras, Greek painter and educator (born 1832)
- 1917 – Louis-Philippe Hébert, Canadian sculptor (born 1850)
- 1918 – Michael Alexandrovich, Russian Grand Duke (born 1878)
- 1930 – Henry Segrave, American-English racing driver (born 1896)
- 1931 – Kitasato Shibasaburō, Japanese medical doctor and bacteriologist (born 1851)
- 1939 – Arthur Coningham, Australian cricketer (born 1863)
- 1943 – Kočo Racin, Macedonian author and activist (born 1908)
- 1943 – Sava Kovačević, Yugoslav Partisan divisional commander and People's Hero of Yugoslavia (born 1905)
- 1948 – Osamu Dazai, Japanese author (born 1909)
- 1951 – Ben Chifley, Australian engineer and politician, 16th Prime Minister of Australia (born 1885)
- 1957 – Irving Baxter, American high jumper and pole vaulter (born 1876)
- 1958 – Edwin Keppel Bennett, English poet and academic (born 1887)
- 1965 – Martin Buber, Austrian-Israeli philosopher and theologian (born 1878)
- 1965 – David Drummond, Australian farmer and politician (born 1890)
- 1969 – Pralhad Keshav Atre, Indian journalist, director and producer (born 1898)
- 1972 – Georg von Békésy, Hungarian biophysicist and academic, Nobel Prize laureate (born 1899)
- 1972 – Stephanie von Hohenlohe, Austrian-German spy (born 1891)
- 1979 – Demetrio Stratos, Egyptian-Italian singer-songwriter and pianist (born 1945)
- 1980 – Walter Rodney, Guyanese historian and activist (born 1942)
- 1981 – Olivério Pinto, Brazilian zoologist and medical doctor (born 1896)
- 1984 – António Variações, Portuguese singer-songwriter (born 1944)
- 1986 – Benny Goodman, American clarinet player, songwriter and bandleader (born 1909)
- 1987 – Geraldine Page, American actress (born 1924)
- 1989 – Fran Allison, American television personality and puppeteer (born 1907)
- 1993 – Gérard Côté, Canadian runner (born 1913)
- 1993 – Deke Slayton, American soldier, pilot and astronaut (born 1924)
- 1994 – Nadia Gray, Romanian-French actress (born 1923)
- 1997 – Nguyen Manh Tuong, Vietnamese lawyer and academic (born 1909)
- 1998 – Alfred Gerrard, English sculptor and academic (born 1899)
- 1998 – Birger Ruud, Norwegian ski jumper (born 1911)
- 1998 – Reg Smythe, English cartoonist (born 1917)
- 2002 – John Hope, American navigator and meteorologist (born 1919)
- 2002 – Maia Wojciechowska, Polish-American author (born 1927)
- 2003 – Malik Meraj Khalid, Pakistani lawyer and politician, Prime Minister of Pakistan (born 1916)
- 2004 – Ralph Wiley, American journalist and author (born 1952)
- 2005 – Álvaro Cunhal, Portuguese academic and politician (born 1913)
- 2005 – David Diamond, American pianist and composer (born 1915)
- 2006 – Charles Haughey, Irish lawyer and politician, 7th Taoiseach of Ireland (born 1925)
- 2007 – Walid Eido, Lebanese judge and politician (born 1942)
- 2008 – Tim Russert, American journalist and lawyer (born 1950)
- 2009 – Mitsuharu Misawa, Japanese professional wrestler (born 1962)
- 2009 – Fathi Yakan, Lebanese scholar and politician (born 1933)
- 2010 – Jimmy Dean, American singer and businessman, founded Jimmy Dean Foods (born 1928)
- 2012 – Sam Beddingfield, American pilot and engineer (born 1933)
- 2012 – Graeme Bell, Australian pianist, composer and bandleader (born 1914)
- 2012 – Roger Garaudy, French philosopher and author (born 1913)
- 2012 – Jože Humer, Slovenian composer and translator (born 1934)
- 2012 – Mehdi Hassan, Pakistani ghazal singer and playback singer for Lollywood (born 1927)
- 2013 – David Deutsch, American businessman, founded Deutsch Inc. (born 1929)
- 2013 – Sam Most, American flute player and saxophonist (born 1930)
- 2013 – Albert White Hat, American educator and activist (born 1938)
- 2014 – Mahdi Elmandjra, Moroccan economist and sociologist (born 1933)
- 2014 – Gyula Grosics, Hungarian footballer and manager (born 1926)
- 2014 – Jim Keays, Scottish-Australian singer-songwriter and guitarist (born 1946)
- 2014 – Chuck Noll, American football player and coach (born 1932)
- 2014 – Robert Peters, American poet, playwright and critic (born 1924)
- 2015 – Buddy Boudreaux, American saxophonist and clarinet player (born 1917)
- 2015 – Sergio Renán, Argentinian actor, director and screenwriter (born 1933)
- 2015 – Mike Shrimpton, New Zealand cricketer and coach (born 1940)
- 2021 – Ned Beatty, American actor (born 1937)
- 2023 – Cormac McCarthy, American author (born 1933)
- 2024 – Angela Bofill, American R&B singer (born 1954)
- 2024 – Benji Gregory, American child actor (born 1978)
- 2026 – Roger Cook, New Zealand-born British investigative journalist (born 1943)

== Holidays and observances ==
- Christian feast day:
  - Anthony of Padua, Doctor of the Church
  - Aquilina
  - Cetteus (Peregrinus)
  - Eulogius of Alexandria
  - Felicula
  - G. K. Chesterton (Episcopal Church (USA))
  - Gerard of Clairvaux
  - Blessed Marianna Biernacka
  - Psalmodius
  - Ragnebert (Rambert)
  - Blessed Thomas Woodhouse
  - Triphyllius
  - June 13 (Eastern Orthodox liturgics)
- Inventors' Day (Hungary)
- Suleimaniah City Fallen and Martyrs Day (Iraqi Kurdistan)
- International Albinism Awareness Day (international)
