= June 13 (Eastern Orthodox liturgics) =

Day in the Eastern Orthodox liturgical calendar

Eastern Orthodox liturgical calendar
June 12	June 13	June 14
June 13 O.S. ≍ June 26 N.S. June 13 N.S ≍ May 31 O.S.

An Eastern Orthodox cross

June 13 in Eastern Orthodox liturgical calendars is a feast day and a day of commemoration of saints and martyrs. Although some Orthodox churches use the Revised Julian Calendar and others use the traditional Julian calendar, the fixed commemorations for their respective June 13 are broadly the same, no matter which calendar is used. (Note: Despite the dates being the same, the days to which they refer typically differ by 13 days. The notation Old Style or O.S. is sometimes used to indicate a date in the traditional Julian Calendar (the "Old Calendar"). The notation New Style or N.S. indicates a date in the Revised Julian calendar (the "New Calendar").)

== Saints ==
- Martyr Aquilina of Byblos in Lebanon (293) (Note: "At Byblos, in Palestine, St. Aquilina, virgin and martyr, at the age of twelve years, under the emperor Diocletian and the judge Volusian. For the confession of the faith she was buffeted, scourged, pierced with red-hot bodkins, and being struck with the sword, consecrated her virginity by martyrdom.")
- Martyr Antonina of Nicaea (c. 284–305)
- Martyr Diodorus of Emesus, who was crucified.
- The Myriad Holy Martyrs, by the sword.
- Saint Triphyllius, Bishop of Ledra (Leucosia, Nicosia) in Cyprus (c. 370)
- Saint Antipater of Bostra, Bishop of Bostra in Arabia Petraea (458)
- Saint Eulogius of Alexandria, Patriarch of Alexandria (607) (Note: Sophronios Eustratiadis and others believe that this refers most likely to Eulogius, Patriarch of Antioch, since the memory of the Venerable Eulogius of Alexandria is observed on February 13. However the Patriarchal Lists of the Church of Antioch do not mention the name Eulogios.)
- Saint Anna of Larissa in Thessaly (826) and her son John (9th century)
- Saint Jacob the Ascetic (James), who was demonically deceived and worshipped antichrist, but later repented.

== Pre-Schism Western saints ==
- Saint Felicula, a virgin-martyr in Rome under Domitian (c. 90) (Note: She was left for a fortnight in prison without food or drink and was thrown into a ditch to die. Her body was recovered by St Nicomedes.) (Note: "At Rome, on the Ardeatine road, the birthday of St. Felicula, virgin and martyr, who was delivered to the judge for refusing to marry Flaccus and to sacrifice to idols. As she persevered in the confession of Christ, he confined her in a dark dungeon without food, and afterwards caused her to be racked until she expired. She was then cast into a sewer; but St. Nicomedes buried her on the road just mentioned.")
- Saints Fortunatus and Lucian, martyrs in North Africa.
- Saint Damhnade, a holy virgin in Ireland who was greatly venerated in County Cavan and County Fermanagh.
- Saint Damnat, a nun who seems to have lived and died at Sliabh Beagh, County Monaghan, Ireland, possibly the same as Damhnade.
- Saint Peregrinus (Cetheus, Cetteus, Cetteo di Amiterno), Bishop of L'Aquila in the Abruzzi in Italy (c. 600) (Note: He was drowned in the River Aterno by the Arian Lombards for asking for mercy for a condemned prisoner.) (Note: "In Abruzzo, St. Peregrinus, bishop and martyr. For the Catholic faith he was thrown into the river Pescara by the Lombards.")
- Saint Rambert (Ragnebert, Ragnobert), a courtier in Austrasia in the east of France, he was murdered by the tyrant Ebroin in the Jura mountains (c. 680) (Note: "[Gallican Martyrologies. Authority:—The Breviary lessons of the abbey of S. Rembert]: S. Ragnbert, or Rembert, was the son of Radbert, duke of the provinces between the Seine and Loire. He was brought up in the love and fear of God. Ebroin, mayor of the palace under King Thierri, out of jealousy of his rank, power, and influence, determined to free himself of Ragnbert, as he had freed himself from other great nobles whom he dreaded. He hired a couple of assassins to murder him. They drew him on some excuse into a lonely spot at Brou, near Ambournay, and there ran him through with a lance.") (Note: See: (in French) Ragnebert. Wikipédia. (French Wikipedia).)
- Saint Fandilas, a priest and Abbot of Peñamelaria near Cordoba in Spain, beheaded in Cordoba by order of the Emir Mohammed (853) (Note: "At Cordova, in the persecution of the Arabs, St. Fandila, a priest and monk, who underwent martyrdom by decapitation for the faith of Christ.")

== Post-Schism Orthodox saints ==
- Venerable Andronicus, disciple of Saint Sergius of Radonezh, Abbot (1395) (Note: See: (in Russian) Андроник Московский. Википе́дия. (Russian Wikipedia).)
- Venerable Sabbas of Moscow, Abbot (1410) (Note: See: (in Russian) Савва Московский. Википе́дия. (Russian Wikipedia).)
- Saint Niphon Kausokalybites, monk, of Kapsokalyvia, Mount Athos (1411) (see also: June 14 )
- Saint Philotheos of Sklataina, second founder of the Monastery of St. Stephen at Meteora (1550)
- New Hieromartyr Anthimus the Iberian, Metropolitan of Wallachia (1716)
- Venerable Alexandra (Melgunova) of Diveyevo, foundress of Diveyevo Convent (1789) (Note: See: (in Russian) Александра (Мельгунова). Википе́дия. (Russian Wikipedia).)
- Saint John Triantaphyllides, the New Chrysostom and Merciful, of Chaldia in Asia Minor (1903) (Note: The Uncovering of the Relics (in 1906) is celebrated on October 7.)

=== New martyrs and confessors ===
- New Hieromartyr Alexei Archangelsky, Priest (1918)
- New Hieromartyr Demetrius, Priest (1940)
- Virgin-Martyr Pelagea Zidko (1944)

== Other commemorations ==
- Finding of the relics (1960) of Hieromartyr Nicholas of Lesvos, Deacon (1463)
- Synaxis of New Martyrs and Confessors of Zaporizhzhia, Ukraine.
- Repose of Archimandrite Dimitry (Egorov) of Santa Rosa, California (1992)

== Icon gallery ==
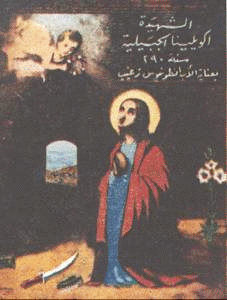
St. Aquilina.

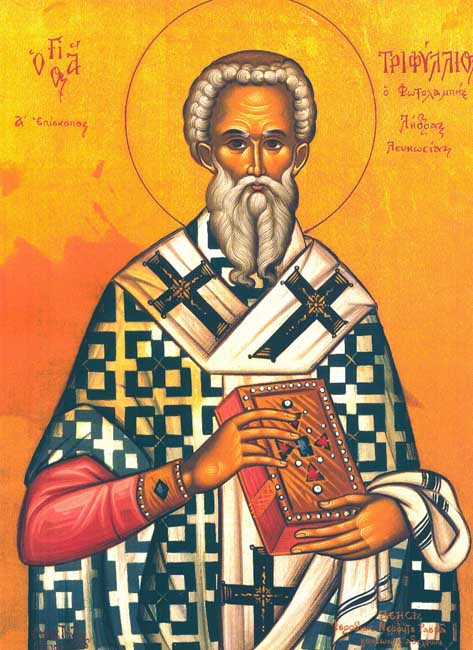
St. Triphyllius, Bishop of Ledra (Leucosia).

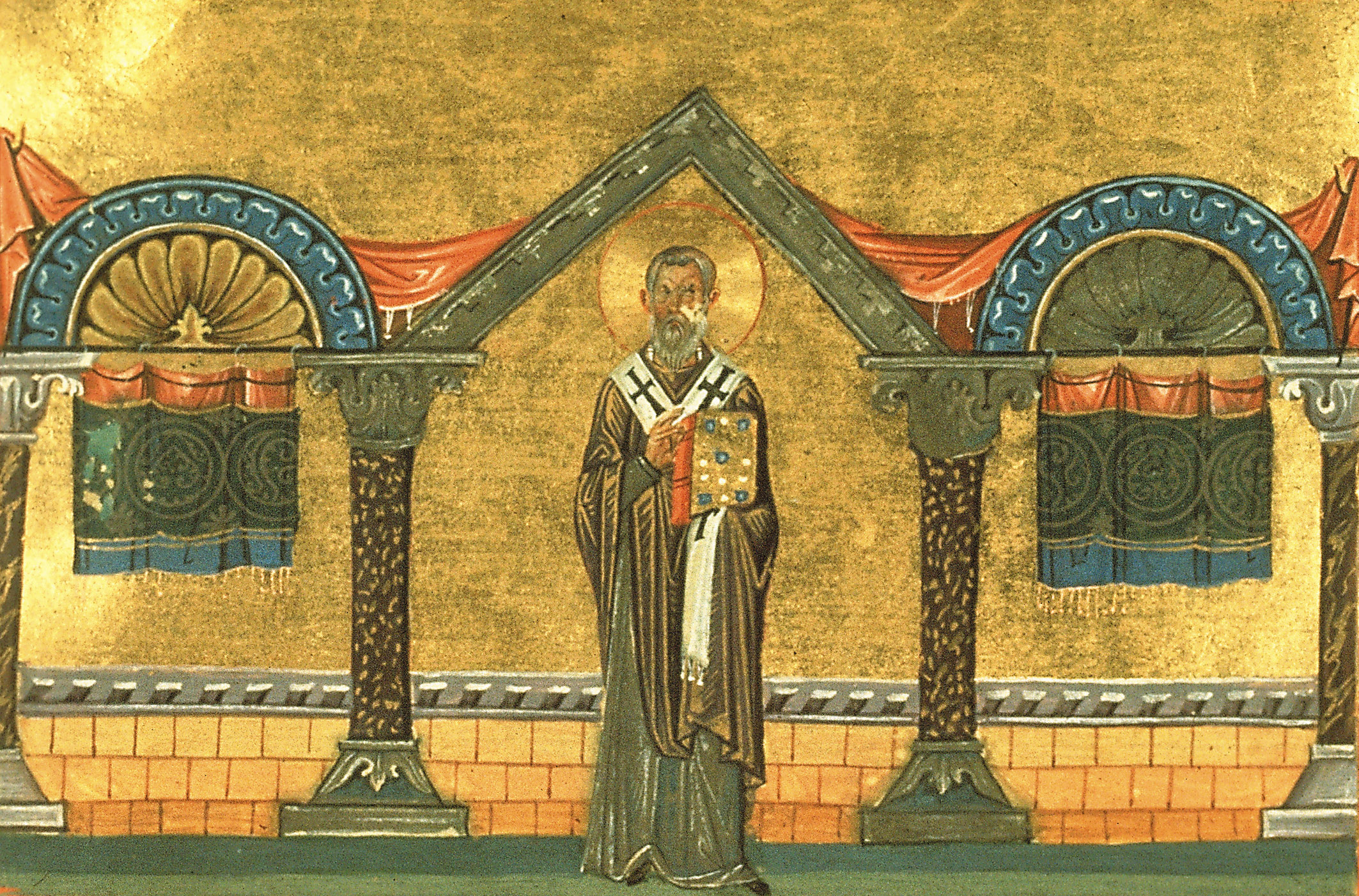
St. Eulogius of Alexandria.

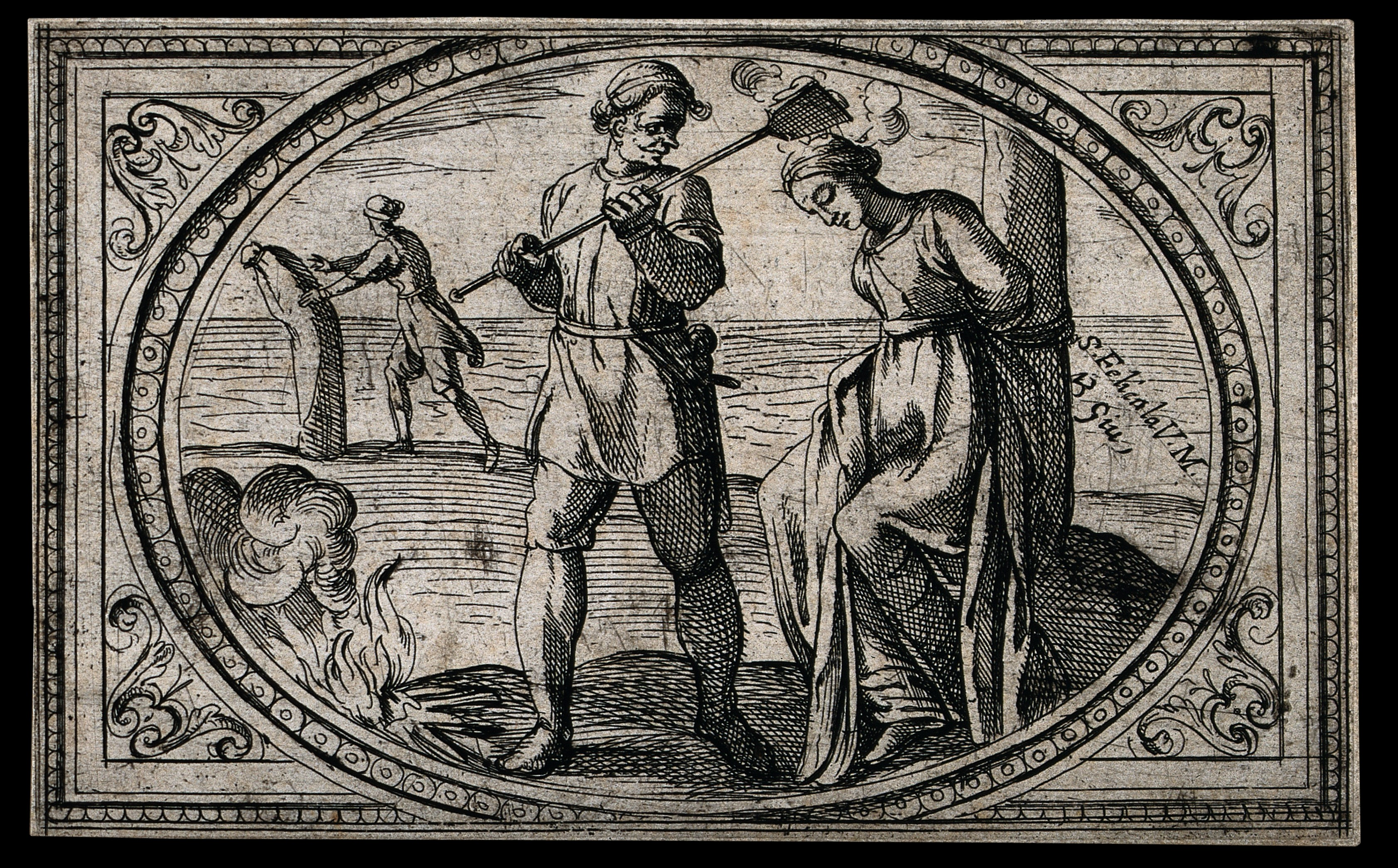
Martyrdom of St. Felicula.

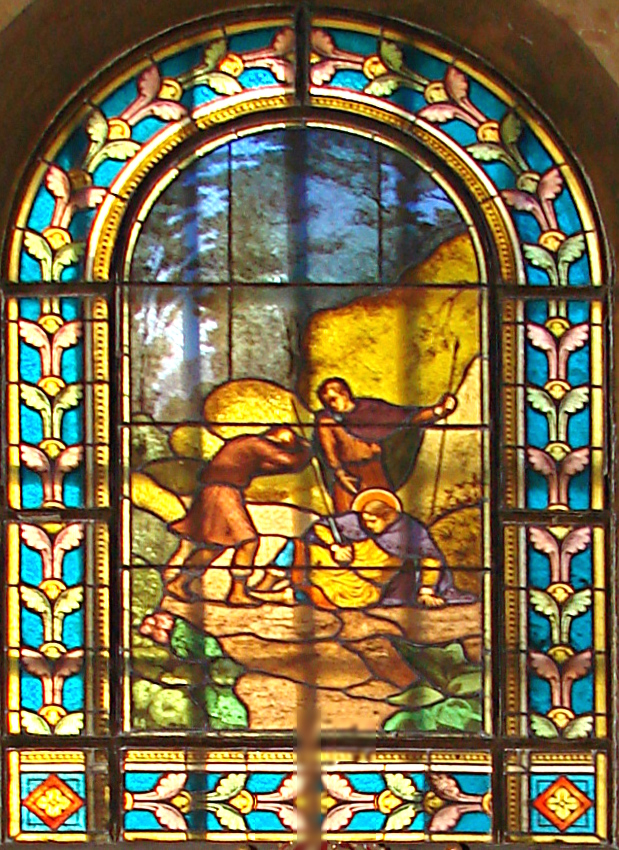
Martyrdom of St. Ragnebert.

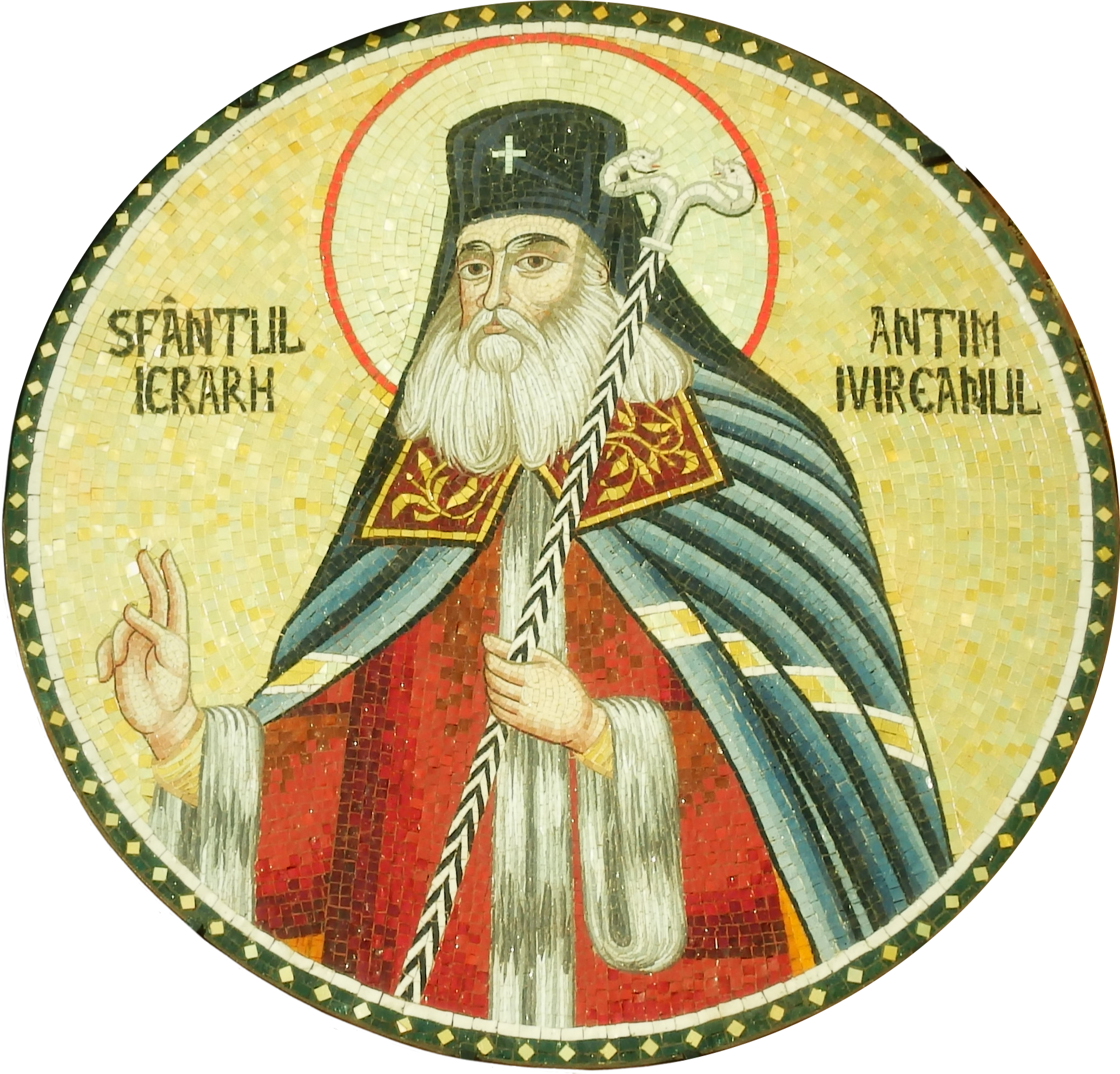
New Hieromartyr Anthimus the Iberian, Metropolitan of Wallachia.

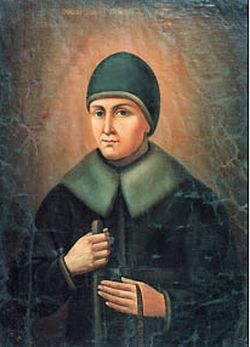
Venerable Alexandra (Melgunova) of Diveyevo Convent.

== Sources ==
- June 13/26. Orthodox Calendar (PRAVOSLAVIE.RU).
- June 26 / June 13. HOLY TRINITY RUSSIAN ORTHODOX CHURCH (A parish of the Patriarchate of Moscow).
- June 13. OCA - The Lives of the Saints.
- The Autonomous Orthodox Metropolia of Western Europe and the Americas (ROCOR). St. Hilarion Calendar of Saints for the year of our Lord 2004. St. Hilarion Press (Austin, TX). pp. 43–44.
- The Thirteenth Day of the Month of June. Orthodoxy in China.
- June 13. Latin Saints of the Orthodox Patriarchate of Rome.
- The Roman Martyrology. Transl. by the Archbishop of Baltimore. Last Edition, According to the Copy Printed at Rome in 1914. Revised Edition, with the Imprimatur of His Eminence Cardinal Gibbons. Baltimore: John Murphy Company, 1916. p. 172.
- Rev. Richard Stanton. A Menology of England and Wales, or, Brief Memorials of the Ancient British and English Saints Arranged According to the Calendar, Together with the Martyrs of the 16th and 17th Centuries. London: Burns & Oates, 1892. pp. 267–268.

Greek Sources

- Great Synaxaristes: (in Greek) 13 ΙΟΥΝΙΟΥ. ΜΕΓΑΣ ΣΥΝΑΞΑΡΙΣΤΗΣ.
- (in Greek) Συναξαριστής. 13 Ιουνίου. ECCLESIA.GR. (H ΕΚΚΛΗΣΙΑ ΤΗΣ ΕΛΛΑΔΟΣ).
- (in Greek) 13 Ιουνίου. Αποστολική Διακονία της Εκκλησίας της Ελλάδος (Apostoliki Diakonia of the Church of Greece).
- (in Greek) 13/06/2017. Ορθόδοξος Συναξαριστής.

Russian Sources

- (in Russian) 26 июня (13 июня). Православная Энциклопедия под редакцией Патриарха Московского и всея Руси Кирилла (электронная версия). (Orthodox Encyclopedia - Pravenc.ru).
- (in Russian) 13 июня по старому стилю / 26 июня по новому стилю. Русская Православная Церковь - Православный церковный календарь на 2017 год.
- (in Russian) 13 июня (ст.ст.) 26 июня 2014 (нов. ст.). Русская Православная Церковь Отдел внешних церковных связей. (DECR).
