= June 14 (Eastern Orthodox liturgics) =

Day in the Eastern Orthodox liturgical calendar

Eastern Orthodox liturgical calendar
| June 13 | June 14 | June 15 |
June 14 O.S. ≍ June 27 N.S. June 14 N.S ≍ June 1 O.S.

An Eastern Orthodox cross

June 14 in Eastern Orthodox liturgical calendars is a feast day and a day of commemoration of saints and martyrs. Although some Orthodox churches use the Revised Julian Calendar and others use the traditional Julian calendar, the fixed commemorations for their respective June 14 are broadly the same, no matter which calendar is used. (Note: Despite the dates being the same, the days to which they refer typically differ by 13 days. The notation Old Style or O.S. is sometimes used to indicate a date in the traditional Julian Calendar (the "Old Calendar"). The notation New Style or N.S. indicates a date in the Revised Julian calendar (the "New Calendar").)

== Saints ==
- Prophet Elisha (9th century BC) (Note: "At Samaria, in Palestine, the holy prophet Eliseus, whose grave, says St. Jerome, makes the demons tremble. With him rests also the prophet Abdias.")
- Hieromartyr Cyril, Bishop of Gortyna on Crete (c. 303) (see also: September 6, July 9)
- Venerable Julitta (Julia) of Tabennisi in Egypt (4th century)
- Saint Methodius the Confessor, Patriarch of Constantinople (846)

== Pre-Schism Western saints ==
- Saint Marcian of Syracuse, Bishop of Syracuse (c. 255) (Note: According to Sicilian tradition he was the first 'Bishop of the West' , sent to Syracuse in Sicily by the Apostle Peter. It is more likely that Marcian was sent to Sicily in the third century. He was martyred by Jews who threw him from a tower. If he was indeed made bishop by Saint Peter, he probably is the same St Marcellus of Sicily commemorated with Sts Philagrius and Pancratius under February 9.) (Note: "At Syracuse, St. Marcian, bishop, who was made bishop by blessed Peter, and killed by the Jews after he had preached the Gospel.") (Note: See: (in Italian) Marciano di Siracusa. Wikipedia. (Italian Wikipedia).)
- Saints Valerius and Rufinus, martyrs in Soissons in France (c. 287) (Note: "At Soissons, the holy martyrs Valerius and Rufinus, who, after enduring many torments, were condemned to be beheaded by the governor Rictiovarus, in the persecution of Diocletian.")
- Saint Protus of Aquileia, martyr (290-304)
- Saint Mark of Lucera, a bishop venerated locally in the south of Italy (c. 328) (Note: See: (in Italian) Marco di Eca. Wikipedia. (Italian Wikipedia).)
- Saint Fortunatus of Naples, bishop (4th century)
- Saint Dogmael, a monk who lived in Dyfed and Anglesey in Wales and also in Brittany (5th-6th centuries) (Note: St Dogmaels Abbey is an abbey in St Dogmaels in Pembrokeshire, Wales, on the banks of the River Teifi and close to Cardigan and Poppit Sands. It is named after Dogmael, a 6th-century saint said to have been the son of Ithel ap Ceredig ap Cunedda Wledig, and also reputedly the cousin of Saint David.)
- Saint Quintian of Rodez, a bishop in France (c. 525)
- Saint Ætherius (Éthére), Bishop of Vienne in France (c. 6th century)
- Saint Nennus (Nem Moccu Birn, Nenus, Nehemias), successor of St Enda as abbot of the monasteries of the Isles of Arran and Bute in Ireland (7th century)
- Saint Psalmodius, a hermit near Limoges (7th century) (Note: "At the 14th June, in the Rev. Alban Butler's work, and in the Circle of the Seasons, we find a St. Psalmodius, Hermit of Ireland. At this date, likewise, the Bollandists have an entry of Psalmodius, whom they make a Hermit, in the country of the Lemovices, or Limosin. However, they refer his festival to the 13th of June.")
- Saint Lotharius (Loyer), Bishop of Séez (c. 756) (Note: Founder of a monastery in the forest of Argentan in France which was later called Saint-Loyer-des-Champs after him. He then became Bishop of Séez for thirty-two years.)
- Saint Gerold (Gervold), a monk of Fontenelle and from 787 Bishop of Evreux in France (806)
- Saints Anastasius, Felix and Digna, Martyrs of Córdoba (853) (Note: Anastasius was a deacon of the church of St Acisclus in Cordoba in Spain, who became a monk at Tábanos near the same town. Felix was born in Alcalá of a Berber family, became a monk in Asturias but joined the monastery at Tábanos, hoping for martyrdom. Digna belonged to the convent there. The three were among the first to confess Christ in Cordoba and were beheaded by order of the Caliph.) (Note: "At Cordova, the holy martyrs Anastasius, priest, Felix, monk, and Digna, virgin.")
- Saint Ciarán of Dissert-Kieran (Cearan), Abbot of Bellach-Duin, now Castle Kerrant, in Ireland, he was called the devout (870)
- Saint Hartwig, twenty-first Archbishop of Salzburg in Austria (1023)
- Saint Richard of St Vannes (Richard of Verdun), called 'Gratia Dei' ('Thanks be to God'), from a phrase he often said; monk at St Vannes in Verdun (1046)

== Post-Schism Orthodox saints ==
- Saint John (Mavropos), Metropolitan of Euchaita (1100)
- Saint Mstislav-George, Prince of Novgorod (1180)
- Saint Methodius of Peshnosha, founder of Peshnosha Monastery, disciple of St. Sergius of Radonezh (1392) (Note: See: (in Russian) Мефодий Пешношский. Википе́дия. (Russian Wikipedia).)
- Venerable Niphon Kausokalybites of Mount Athos, proponent of hesychastic theology (1411) (Note: Name days celebrated today include: Niphon (Νήφων).)
- Venerable Elisha of Sumsk, monk of Suma (Solovki) (15th-16th centuries) (Note: See: (in Russian) Елисей Сумский. Википе́дия. (Russian Wikipedia).)

=== New martyrs and confessors ===
- New Hieromartyr Joseph Sikov, Priest (1918)
- New Hieromartyrs Alexander Parusnikov and Paul Ivanov, Priests, and Nicholas Zapolsky, Deacon (1938)
- 11 New Hieromartyrs and Martyrs of Estonia, under the Soviet occupation (1940s): (Note: "On February 22, 2012, the Holy Synod of the Patriarchate of Constantinople canonized 11 clergy and laity of the Estonian Church who suffered for their faith during the first Soviet occupation in 1940-1941. They are celebrated on June 14." See also August 20 for another group of Estonian Martys, glorified in 2019 by the Ecumenical Patriarchate.)

- New Hieromartyrs Vassili Ristkok (1942), (Note: See: (in Estonian) Vassili Ristkok. Vikipeedia. (Estonian Wikipedia).) Johannes Kraav (1941), Joann Sergejev, Arteemi Vapper (1944) and Nikolai Leisman (1943), (Note: See: (in Estonian) Nikolai Leisman (1902–1943). Vikipeedia. (Estonian Wikipedia).) Priests;
- New Hieromartyrs Vassili Astanin and Peeter Koslov, Deacons;
- New Martyr Presvytera Marta Leisman (1943);
- New Martyrs Joann Lagovski (1941), Theodor Petai (1942) (Note: See: (in Estonian) Theodor Petai. Vikipeedia. (Estonian Wikipedia).) and Anna Petai (1948)

== Other commemorations ==
- Synaxis of the Saints of Diveyevo. (Note: See: (in Russian) Собор Дивеевских святых. Википе́дия. (Russian Wikipedia).)
- Finding of the relics (1992) of New Hieromartyr Vladimir, Metropolitan of Kiev (1918) (see also: January 25 - feast)

== Icon gallery ==
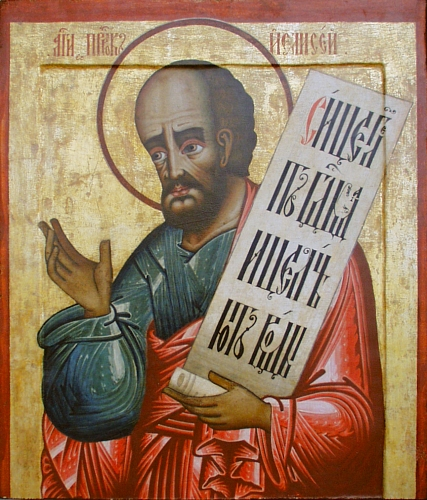
Prophet Elisha.

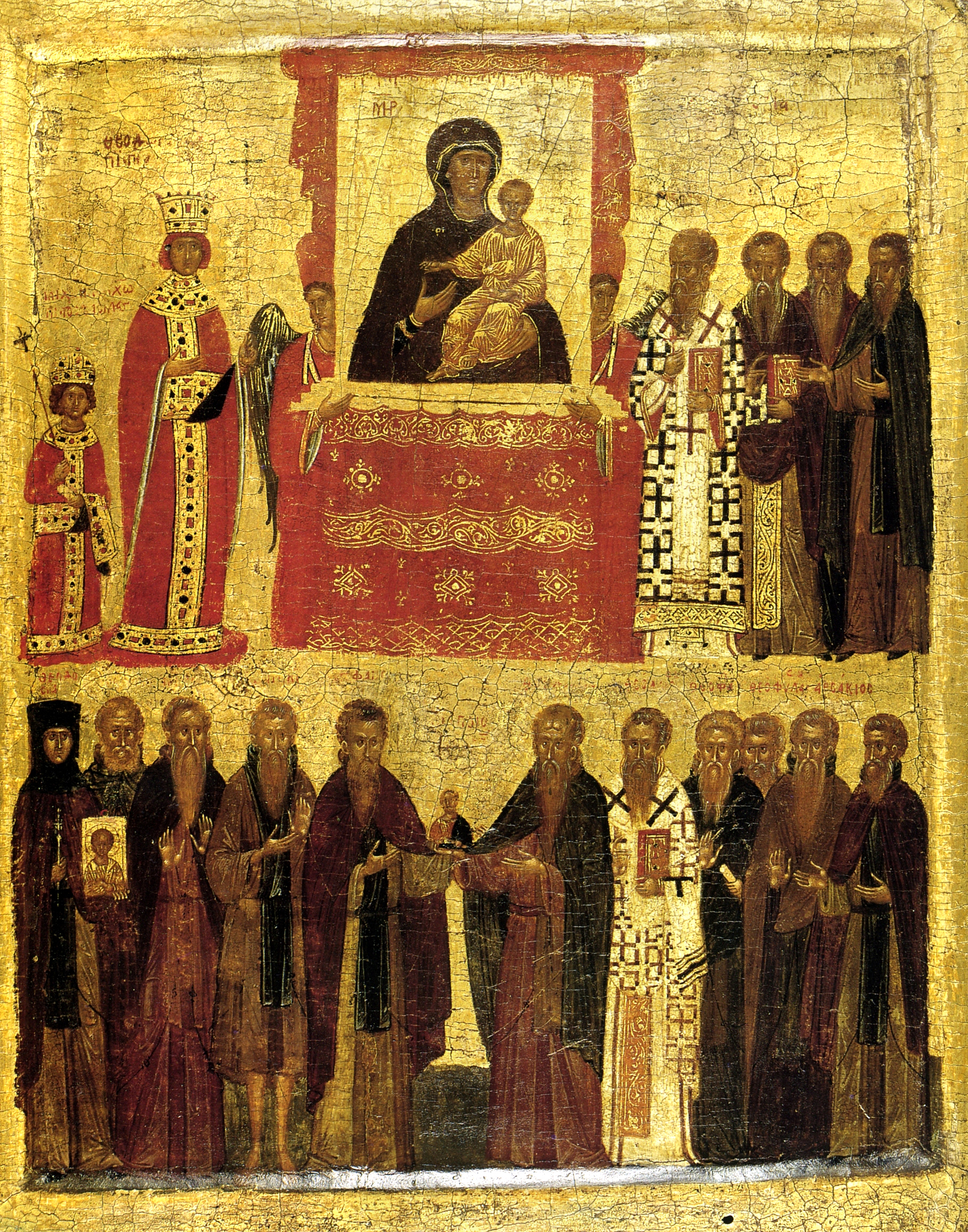
The "Triumph of Orthodoxy" in 843. St. Methodius is depicted in the upper register, to the right of the icon.

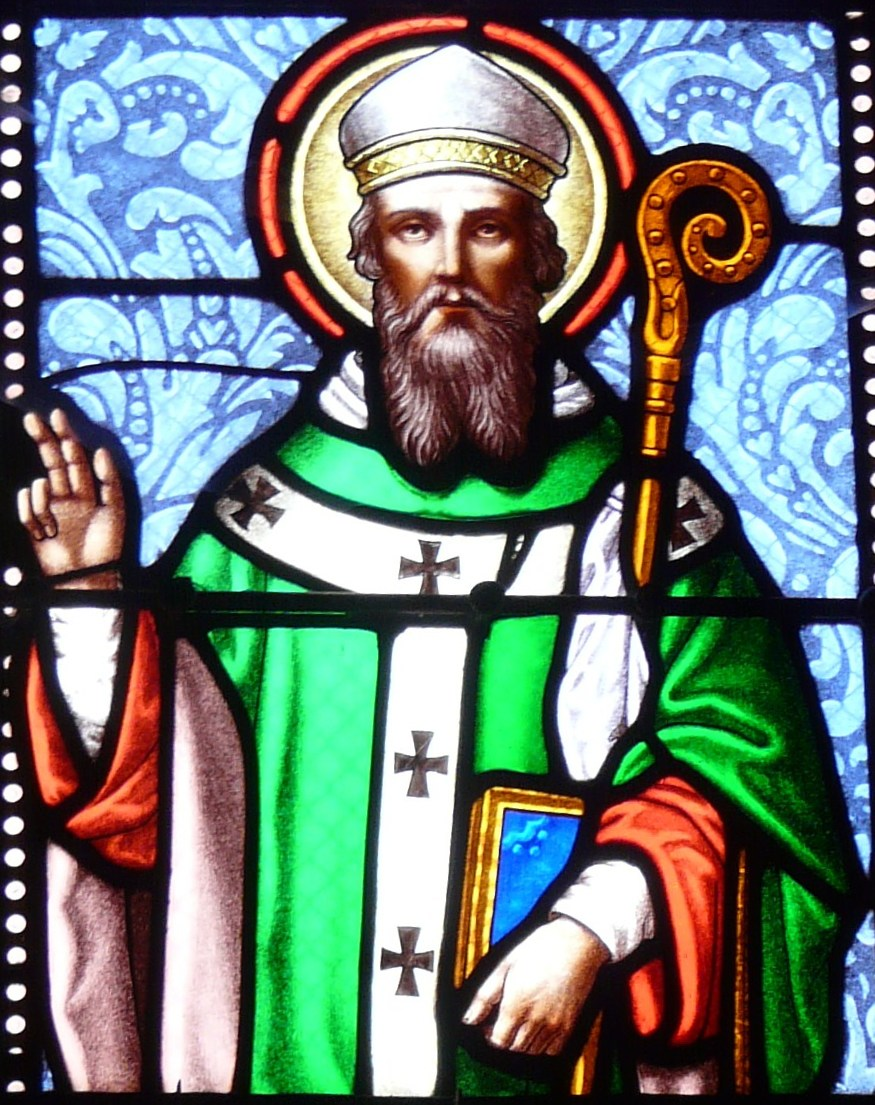
St. Quintian of Rodez.

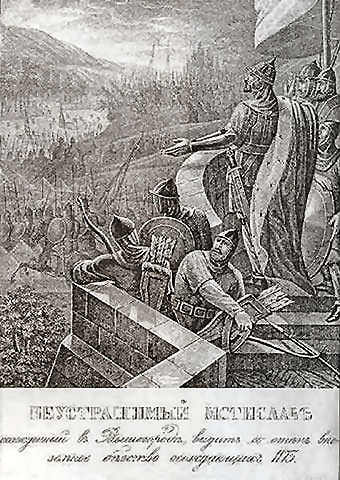
St. Mstislav-George, Prince of Novgorod.

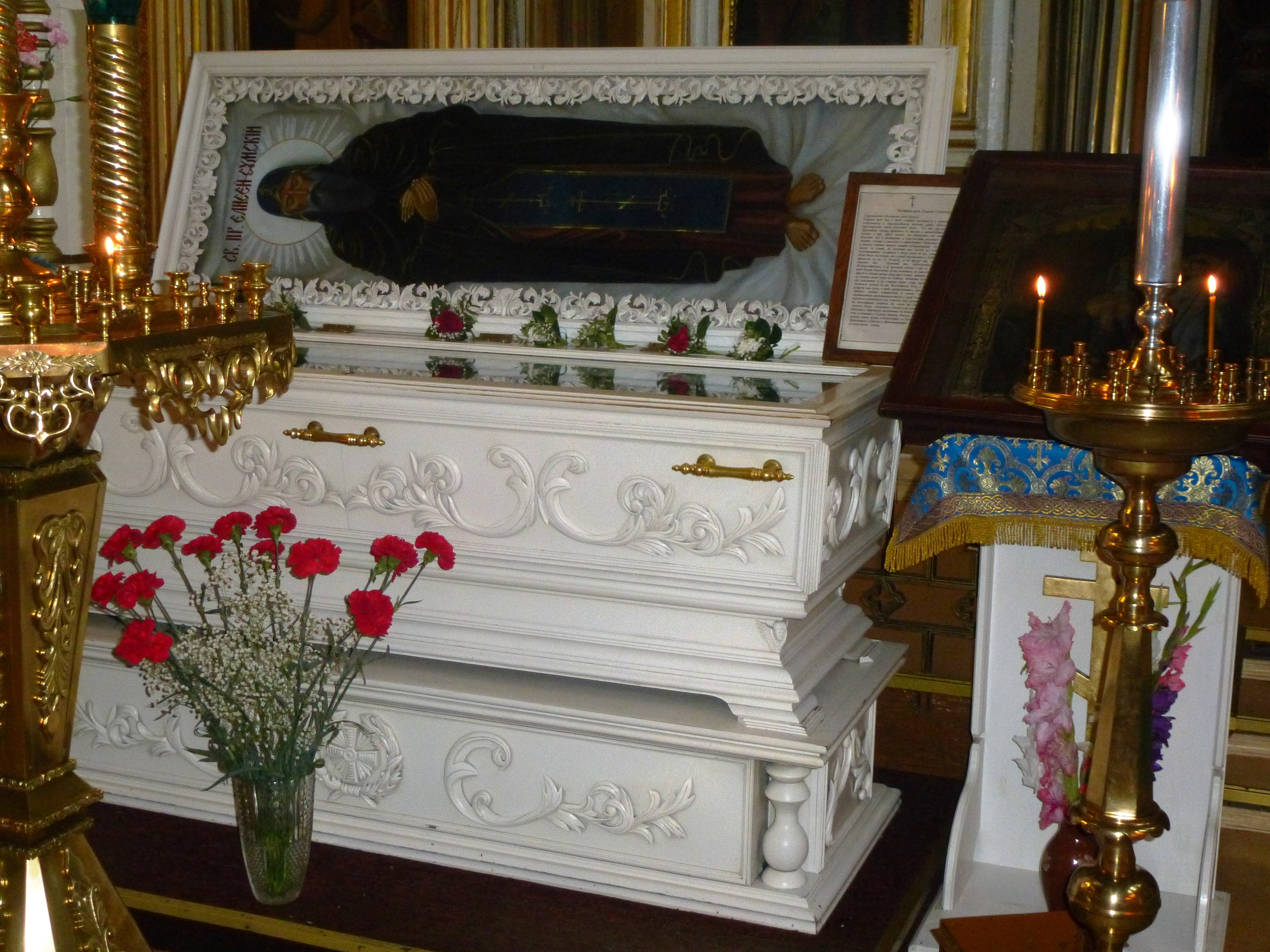
Relics of St. Elisha of Sumsk.

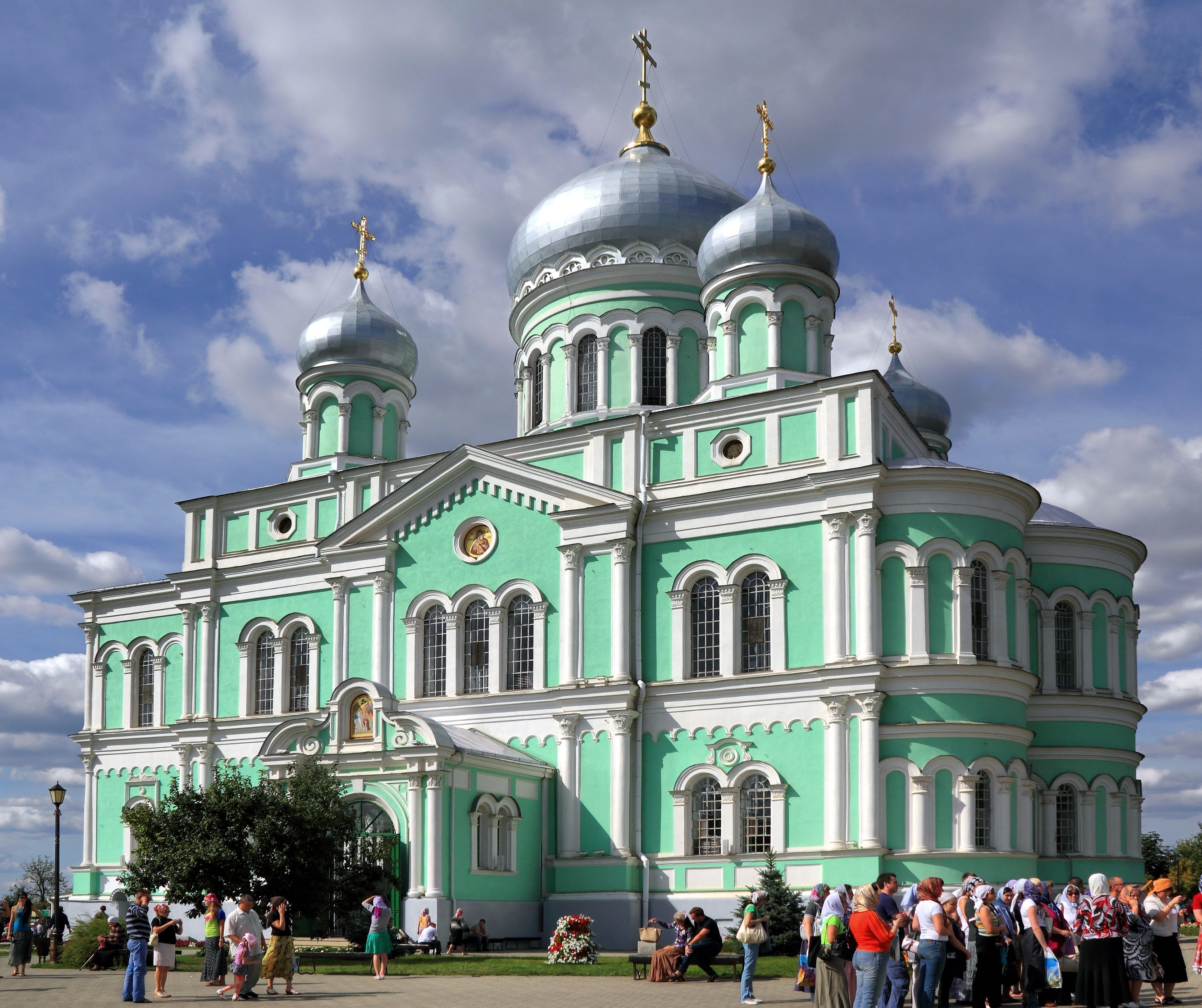
The Katholikon of Diveyevo Convent.

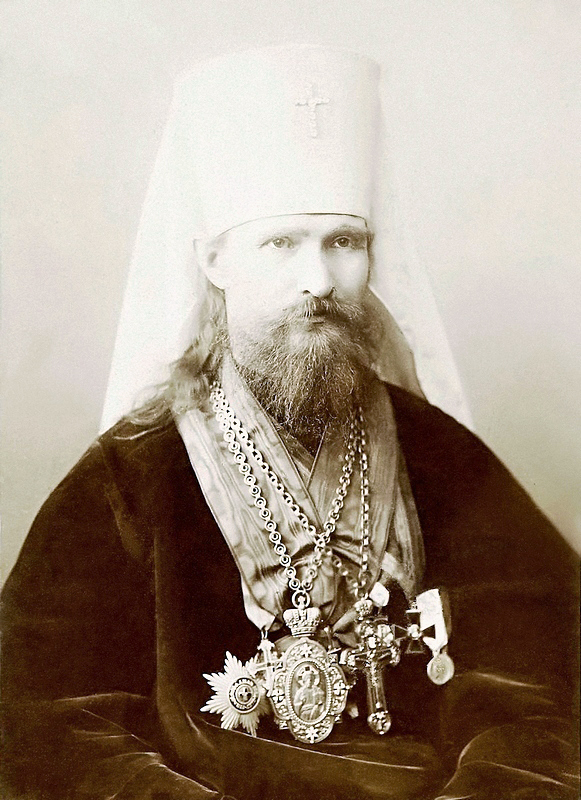
St. Vladimir Bogoyavlensky.

== Sources ==
- June 14/27. Orthodox Calendar (PRAVOSLAVIE.RU).
- June 27 / June 14. HOLY TRINITY RUSSIAN ORTHODOX CHURCH (A parish of the Patriarchate of Moscow).
- June 14. OCA - The Lives of the Saints.
- The Autonomous Orthodox Metropolia of Western Europe and the Americas (ROCOR). St. Hilarion Calendar of Saints for the year of our Lord 2004. St. Hilarion Press (Austin, TX). p. 44.
- The Fourteenth Day of the Month of June. Orthodoxy in China.
- June 14. Latin Saints of the Orthodox Patriarchate of Rome.
- The Roman Martyrology. Transl. by the Archbishop of Baltimore. Last Edition, According to the Copy Printed at Rome in 1914. Revised Edition, with the Imprimatur of His Eminence Cardinal Gibbons. Baltimore: John Murphy Company, 1916. p. 173.
- Rev. Richard Stanton. A Menology of England and Wales, or, Brief Memorials of the Ancient British and English Saints Arranged According to the Calendar, Together with the Martyrs of the 16th and 17th Centuries. London: Burns & Oates, 1892. pp. 268–269.

Greek Sources

- Great Synaxaristes: (in Greek) 14 ΙΟΥΝΙΟΥ. ΜΕΓΑΣ ΣΥΝΑΞΑΡΙΣΤΗΣ.
- (in Greek) Συναξαριστής. 14 Ιουνίου. ECCLESIA.GR. (H ΕΚΚΛΗΣΙΑ ΤΗΣ ΕΛΛΑΔΟΣ).
- (in Greek) 14 Ιουνίου. Αποστολική Διακονία της Εκκλησίας της Ελλάδος (Apostoliki Diakonia of the Church of Greece).
- (in Greek) 14/06/2017. Ορθόδοξος Συναξαριστής.

Russian Sources

- (in Russian) 27 июня (14 июня). Православная Энциклопедия под редакцией Патриарха Московского и всея Руси Кирилла (электронная версия). (Orthodox Encyclopedia - Pravenc.ru).
- (in Russian) 14 июня по старому стилю / 27 июня по новому стилю. Русская Православная Церковь - Православный церковный календарь на 2017 год.
- (in Russian) 14 июня (ст.ст.) 27 июня 2014 (нов. ст.). Русская Православная Церковь Отдел внешних церковных связей. (DECR).
