= Damhnade =

Irish virgin and apparent miracle maker

Saint Damhnade
- Born: Ireland
- Died: Ireland
- Feast: 13 June

Saint Damhnade was an Irish virgin who was known for working miracles. She is sometimes confused with Saint Dymphna. Her feast day is 13 June. Very little else is known of her.

== Monks of Ramsgate's account ==
The monks of St Augustine's Abbey, Ramsgate wrote in their Book of Saints (1921),

DAMHNADE (St.) V. (June 13)

(Date uncertain) An Irish Virgin famed for miracles and greatly venerated in Cavan, Fermanagh, etc. Colgan identifies her with Saint Dympna, the Martyr of Gael in Belgium, but he can scarcely be right, as neither can be Ængus, who makes her out to have been sister to Saint Fursey. Nothing is really known of her life or date.

== Butler's account ==
The hagiographer Alban Butler wrote in his Lives of the Irish Saints (1823),

JUNE 13

Damhnade, V.

The eminent spirit of sanctity which the glorious Saint Patrick bequeathed as it were to a great number of heroic imitators of his virtue, was most conspicuous in the wonderful life of this holy virgin, famed in Ireland for an extraordinary gift of miracles. She is honoured with singular devotion as titular saint of the counties of Fermanagh, Cavan, and others.

== O'Hanlon's research ==
John O'Hanlon (1821–1905) in his Lives of the Irish Saints (1875) discusses Saint Damnat or Damhnat, Virgin, of Sliabh Betha (fifth or sixth century). He notes that the Irish Calendar of the Irish Ordnance Survey says St. Damhnat's festival is on the 13th of June, the Martyrology of Donegal has Damhnat, virgin of Sliabh Betha celebrated on 13 June, and Alban Butler has St. Damhnade on the same date.

== Sources ==
- Butler, Alban (1823), The Lives of the Irish Saints, Extracted from the Writings of the Rev. Alban Butler, and Now Placed in Order, with a Prefixed Callender; to which is Added, an Office and Litany in Their Honour, with a Defence of the Monastic Institute. By a Cistercian Monk, J. Coyne This article incorporates text from this source, which is in the public domain.
- O'Hanlon, John (1875), Lives of the Irish Saints : with special festivals, and the commemorations of holy persons, Dublin: J. Duffy
- St. Augustine's Abbey, Ramsgate (1921), The Book of saints : a dictionary of servants of God canonized by the Catholic Church, London: A. & C. Black, ltd. This article incorporates text from this source, which is in the public domain.
