= Romedius =

Austrian saint

Saint Romedius
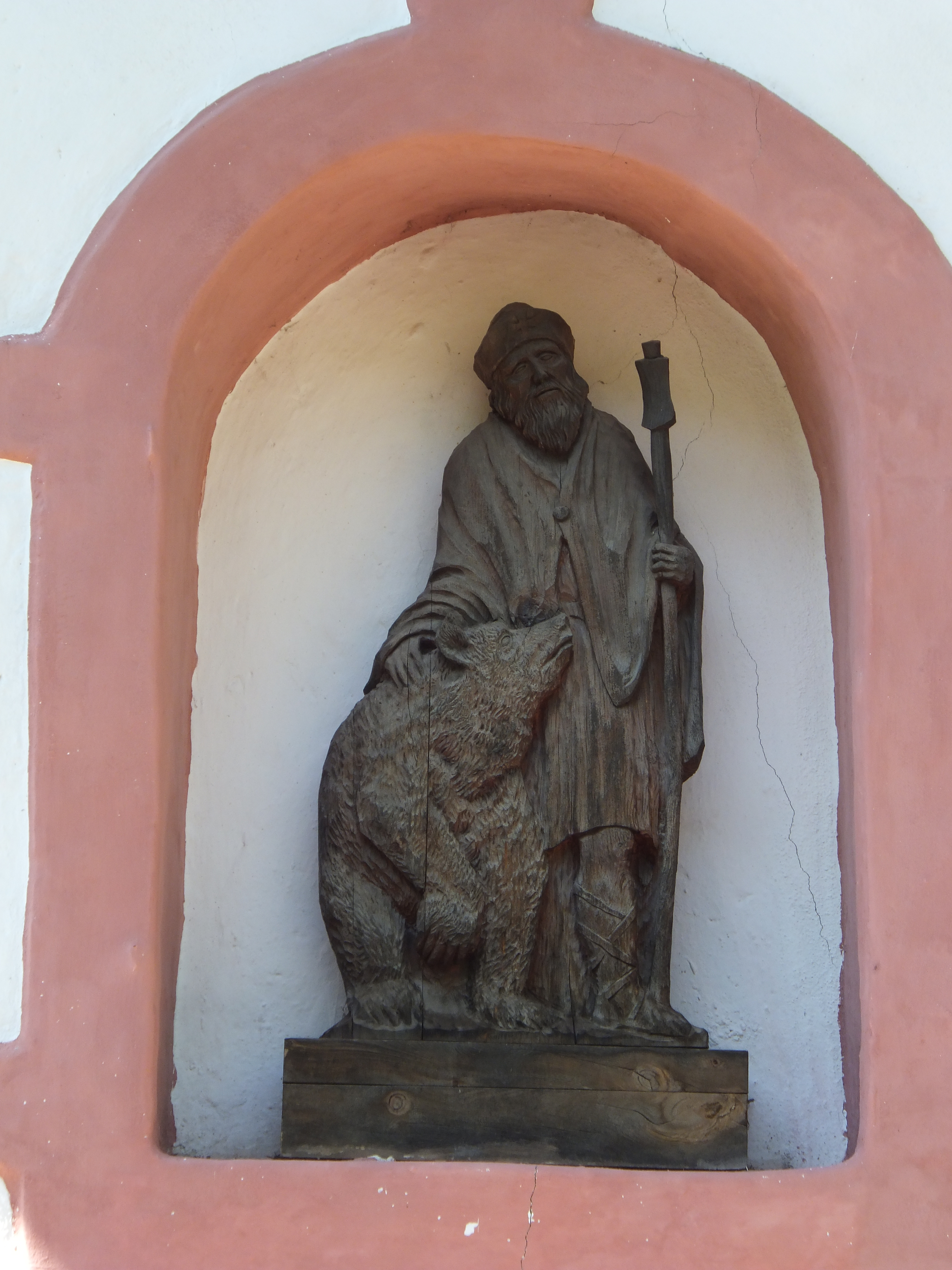
- Statue of the saint in the dedicated church in Barco di Sopra (Albiano, Italy)
- Born: Thaur, Raetia Secunda, Italy, Roman Empire (today Austria)
- Died: c. 4th century Val di Non, Italy
- Venerated in: Roman Catholic Church
- Feast: January 15
- Attributes: depicted riding a bear; alongside a bear; tamed bear

Saint Romedius (Italian: San Romedio). Though the son of a nobleman, as a young man he withdrew to a rock cave in order to meditate. After the death of his parents, he gave away all of his possessions and established himself in the Val di Non (German: Nonstal) in Trentino.

== History ==
Romedius was the son of a noble family, born in the area of a Roman military station, near Innsbruck, in what is now Thaur, Austria. After a pilgrimage to Rome, Romedius gave all his possessions to the Church, withdrawing into a hermitage in some grottoes in the Val di Non. he was accompanied by two companions, Abraham and David. Although the legend says that Romedius died c. 4th century, some think that he was born in the first decades of the 11th century.

== Legend ==
Romedius is often depicted alongside or astride a bear. According to his hagiography he wanted to visit the friend of his youth, St. Vigilius, Bishop of Trento (who died in 405), but his horse was torn to pieces by a wild bear. Romedius, however, had the bear bridled by his disciple David (Davide). The bear became docile and carried Romedius on its back to Trento.

A similar tale is told of Saint Psalmodius and of Lucanus of Sabiona. The tamed bear is a motif also of Saint Corbinian, bishop of Freising.

== Veneration ==
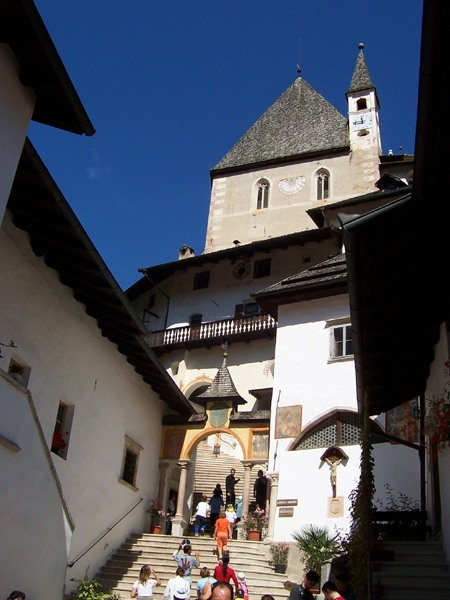
Sanctuary of San Romedio, Sanzeno, Italy

Upon Romedius' death, his disciples carved his burial place into the rock by the grotto where he had lived, a site that was soon visited by pilgrims. The Sanctuary of San Romedio grew from the little church that was built to venerate him to a popular pilgrimage shrine. The Santuario di San Romedio is across the lake from Cles at the head of the Val di Non, above the village of Sanzeno. The sanctuary where Romedio lived with his bear companion is a complex of several churches, from the Romanesque period to the 20th century beyond a gateway in the forested slopes. Votive offerings of crutches line the walls of the narrow stone stairwell up to the highest chapel, said to mark the site of the saint's retreat.

His local cult, which consolidated itself in the course of the 11th century, was officially recognized in the twelfth by the Bishop of Trento. In 1795, permission was given to read masses in his name in the diocese of Brixen, which at that time included the Northern Tyrol. His cult remains popular in Trentino, South Tyrol, Bavaria, and the Austrian Tyrol.

== Romedius' Bear ==
In remembrance of this legend, in 1958 Italian Senator G. G. Gallarati Scotti, honorary member of the committee for the foundation of the World Wildlife Fund in Italy, purchased Charlie, a bear intended to be killed, and donated it to the Sanctuary of San Romedio, in the Valle di Non.

Today, the Province of Trentino protects the last brown bears of the Alps in the Adamello-Brenta National Park, and, near the Sanctuary, takes care of young bears born in captivity in Trentino.

In the work known as Illustrissimi, a collection of letters written by Pope John Paul I when he was Patriarch of Venice, Romedius' bear is one of the "recipients" of the letters.
