= Sanctuary of San Romedio =

Church in Trentino-Alto Adige, Italy

Coordinates: 46.36902°N 11.10635°E

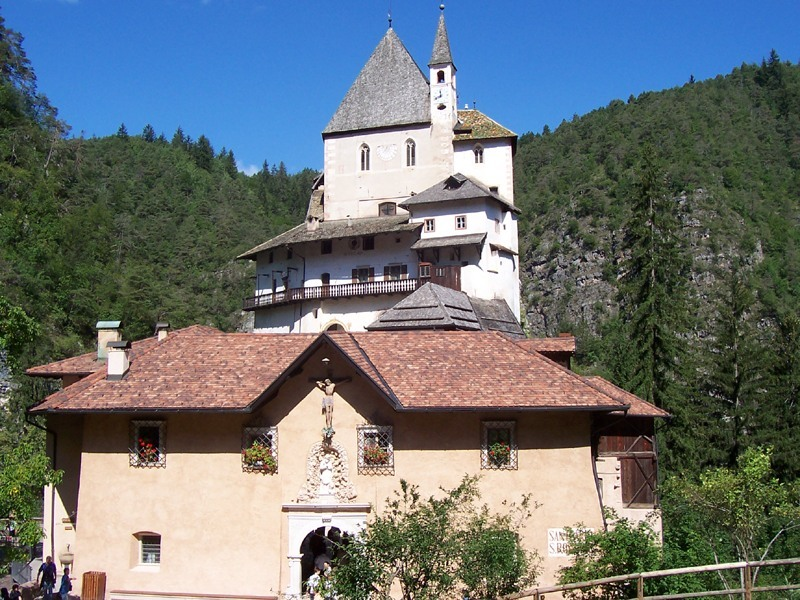
Sanctuary from below

The Sanctuary of San Romedio (Italian: Santuario di San Romedio) is a sanctuary dedicated to Saint Romedius ("San Romedio") situated on a steep rocky spur in the natural scenery of the Val di Non, on the borders of the comuni of Sanzeno and Coredo, Trentino-Alto Adige, Italy.

The sanctuary consists of five churches or chapels built over a period of some 900 years between 1000 and 1918. The five are built close to a steep rock wall and are connected by a spectacular flight of 130 steps. The site is visited by around 200,000 pilgrims every year, and is attended as custodians by two Franciscan friars.

== History ==
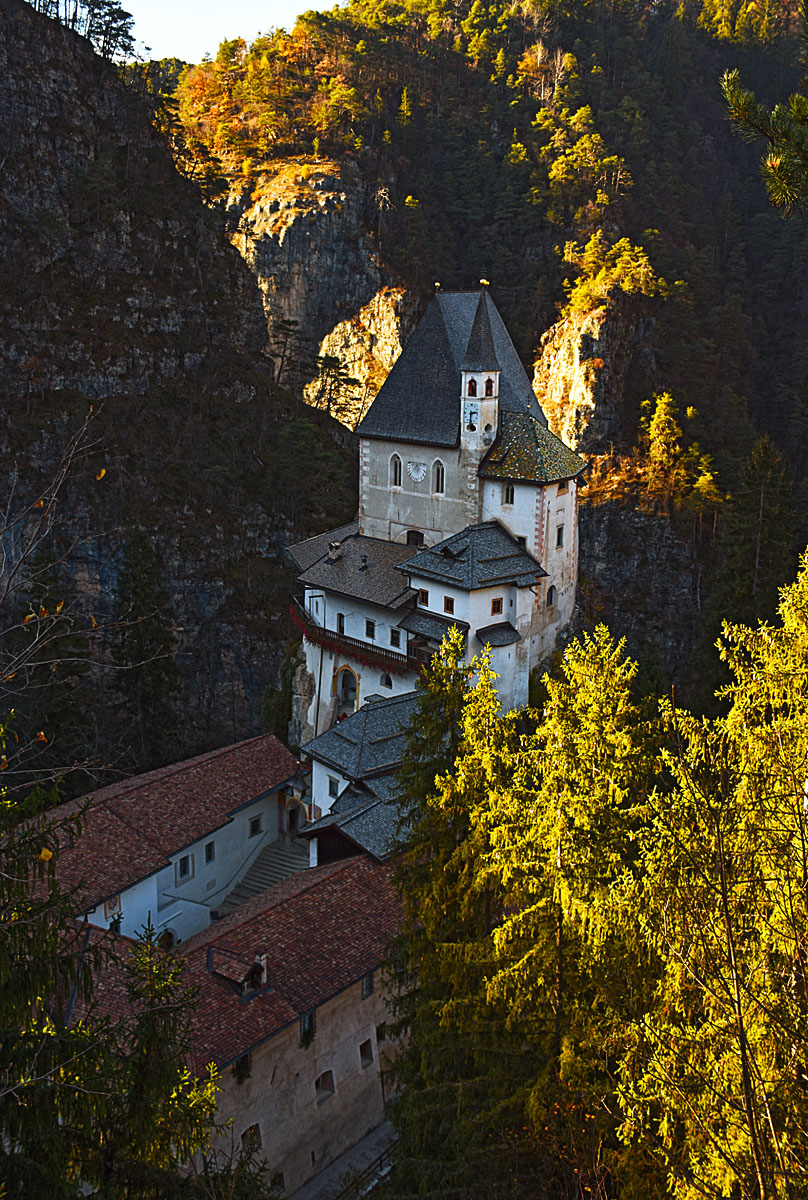
San Romedio from above

According to legend, Romedius lived in the 4th and 5th centuries, the heir of a rich Bavarian family, son of the Count of Thaur, the lord of a castle near Innsbruck and owner of salt pans in the valley of the River Inn. After a pilgrimage to Rome, he gave all his possessions to the Church, withdrawing into a hermitage in the Val di Non in some grottoes which still exist near the sanctuary. Two companions followed him, Abraham and David. The legend is that one day Romedius, wishing to go to Trento to greet Vigilius, then bishop of that city, asked David to saddle the horse. The disciple returned with the news that the horse had been savaged by a bear, whereupon Romedio ordered him to saddle the bear, which not only allowed this to be done but also let Romedio ride it all the way to Trento. It later lived with him at the hermitage. This episode is commemorated by a wooden statue placed next to a triumphal arch at the entrance to the sanctuary. The existence of the hermit, a member of an aristocratic Bavarian family, can be dated to the first decades of the 11th century, about the same time as the development of his cultus.

== Description ==
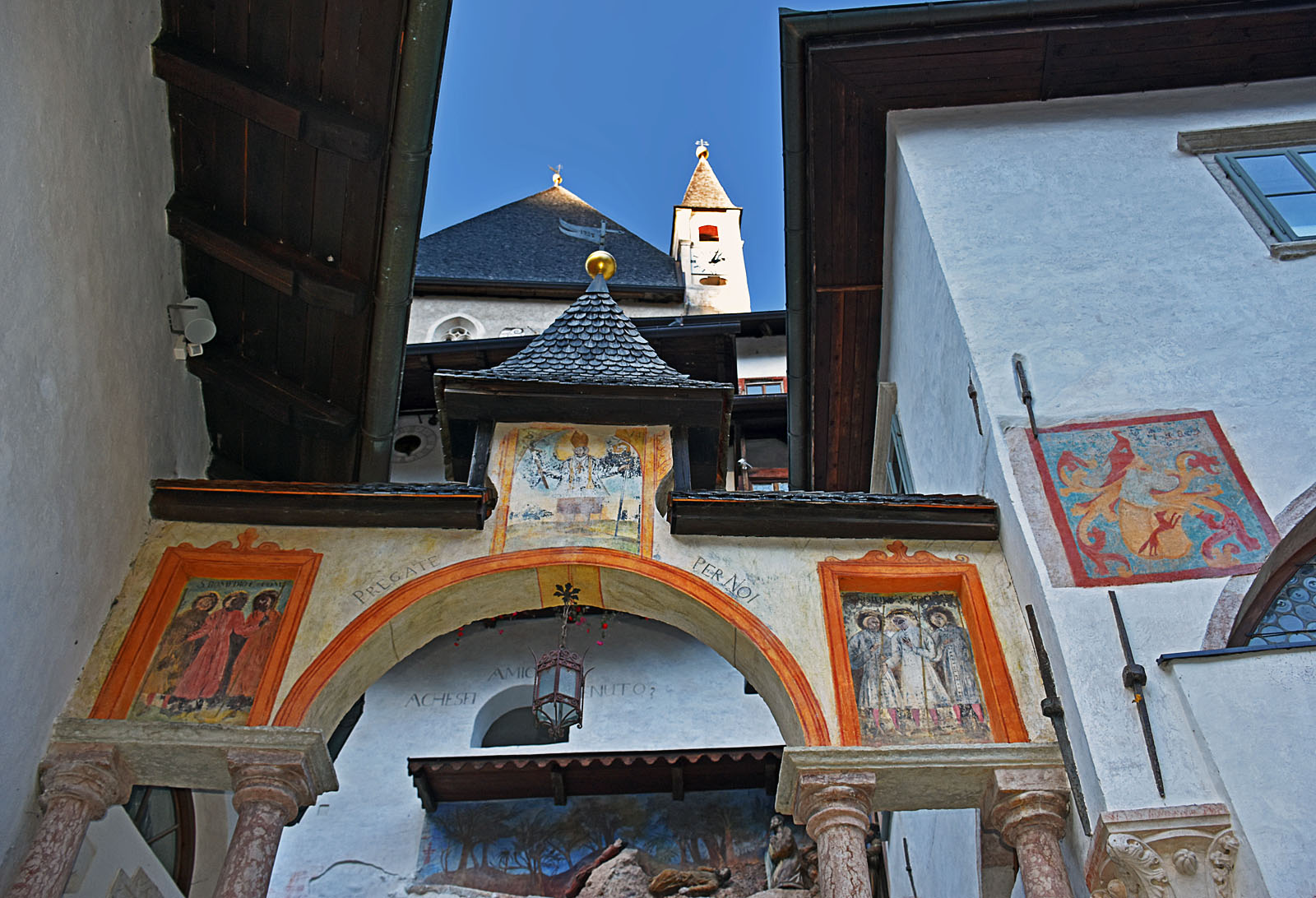
The hermitage entrance

The rock which bore the old sanctuary remained bare for another 500 years or so, with an open flight of steps and a few small huts long since gone. At its base were the stables, the shelters for the pilgrims and the lodging of the custodians.

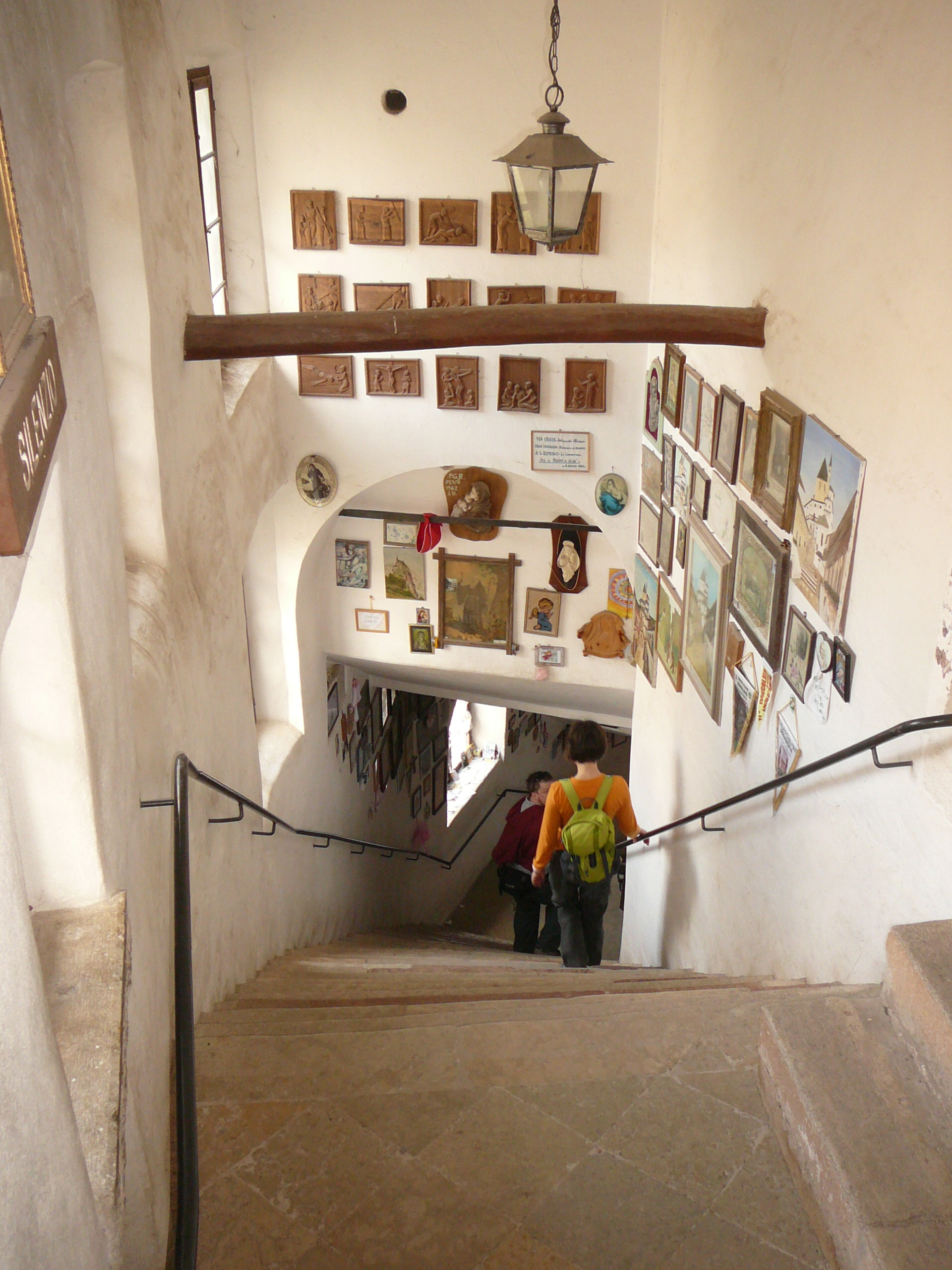
View of the 130 steps from inside the sanctuary

The original church, built at the highest point of the rock, the oldest of the present churches, is dedicated to San Nicolò, and was built around the year 1000 over the tomb of Saint Romedius, with stones carried all the way up by generations of pilgrims. This church also features a colossal Romanesque portal and a Madonna and child giving a blessing (12th century). The relics are preserved in a shrine of 1120. The cult of Saint Romedius was officially recognised by the Church in 1300. Devotion to the saint increased greatly in the 15th century, when the sanctuary was crowded by many pilgrims bringing ex voto's.

In 1487 the construction began of another chapel, this one dedicated to Saint George by the Clesio family; it was much altered in the 18th century. Then in 1514 the church or chapel of Saint Michael was built. This is a typical comital or baronial chapel of the region, still in Clesian Gothic style despite the late date, with a barrel vault. It was built in 1513 by the Counts of Thun-Hohenstein and painted by Adriano Mair in 1584. It contains a Baroque altar of 1713.

In 1536 the Counts of Thun-Hohenstein also built the larger church of Saint Romedius in front of the ancient church to accommodate pilgrims as they drew close to the heart of the sanctuary. It contains a painting on canvas of the Deposition from the Cross of the Veronese School (1695), and one of Saint Romedius as a hermit by G. B. Chiocchetti (1905).

The campanile was also built in the 16th century, using the Clesian Gothic style of the other structures.

In 1700 the sanctuary celebrated the visit of the last pilgrim to the threshold of the tomb of Saint Romedius before it was closed for extensive renovations. The buildings on the lower level used for the hospitality towards the pilgrims, the stables and the barns were entirely reconstructed. The churches were altered for the construction of the "appartamento dei Conti" and of the gallery (1725), the sacristy and the upper library. The second part of the staircase was covered, and then enlivened by the dioramas of the mysteries of the Passion of Christ. The chapel of Saint George was particularly altered to allow for the addition above it of living quarters for two people. Finally the arch at the entrance to the sanctuary was erected, in 1770.

In 1918 construction began on the most recent church, the Church of Our Lady of Sorrows (Chiesa dell'Addolorata), intended as an ex voto for the return of veterans of World War I and of peace. It was dedicated on 1 October 1923.

Also during the 20th century were added the park with the hut of Saint Romedius (1907) and the bear enclosure (1990). The bears were later transferred to the Parco faunistico di Spormaggiore. However, in early 2013 a bear called Bruno from the Parco Nazionale d'Abruzzo was moved close to the sanctuary.

Inside the sanctuary are kept many ex voto's of artistic interest of the 15th, 16th and 17th centuries. The oldest church has frescoes of the Madonna and Child, the Last Supper and a series of angels and saints. The chapel of St. George has frescoes in the vault depicting the Doctors of the Church and the symbols of the Four Evangelists. In the church of St. Michael above the altar is a 16th-century altarpiece showing the Archangel Michael driving Lucifer back to Hell. In the larger church of Saint Romedius the altarpiece shows the hermit himself with the bear on a leash, while the frescoes on the walls depict the Twelve Apostles, the Annunciation and the Assumption.

The feast of Saint Romedius is celebrated on 15 January.

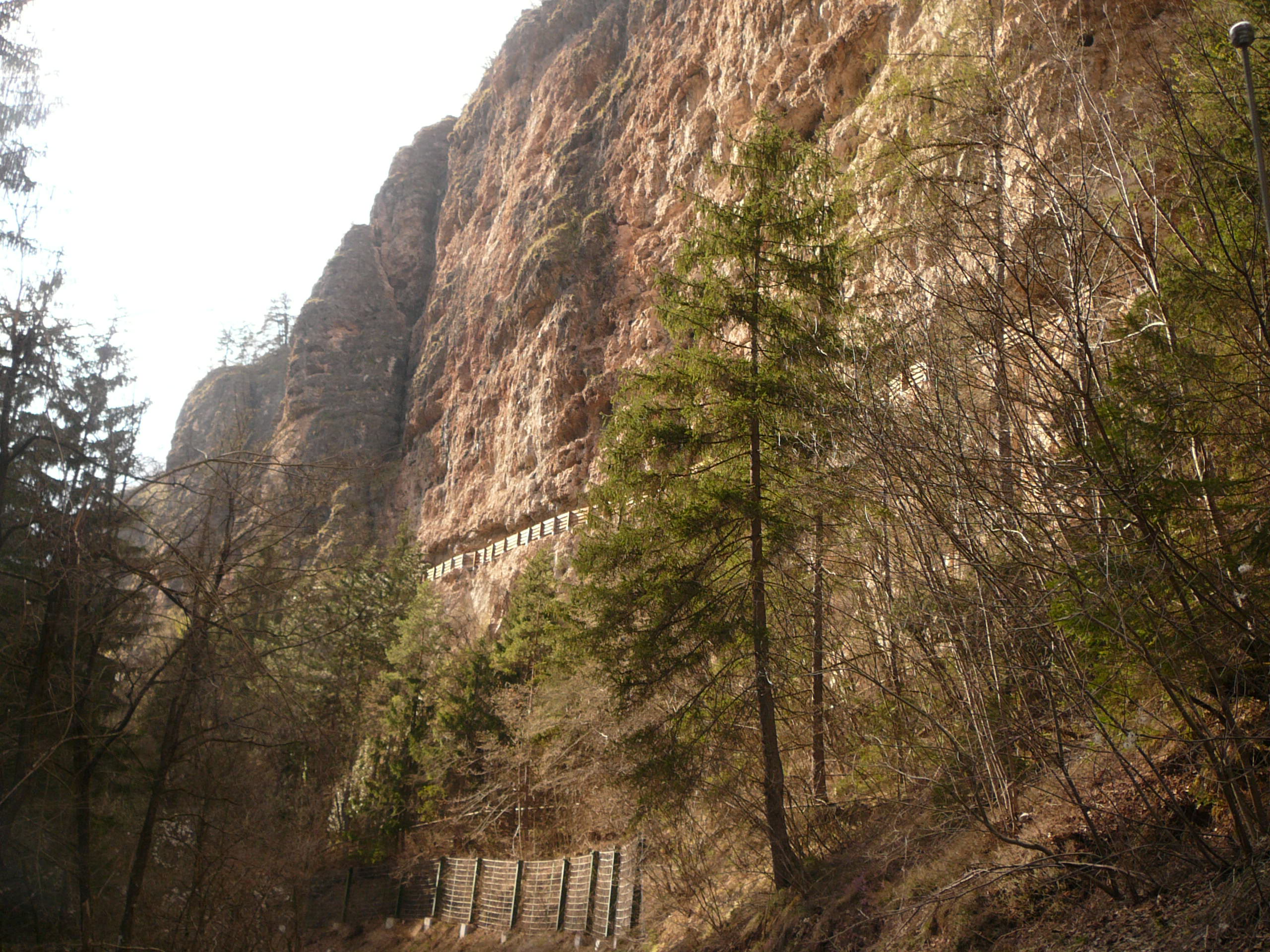
The steep cliff-face footpath to the sanctuary

Various cultural events are held here during the summer.

== Access ==
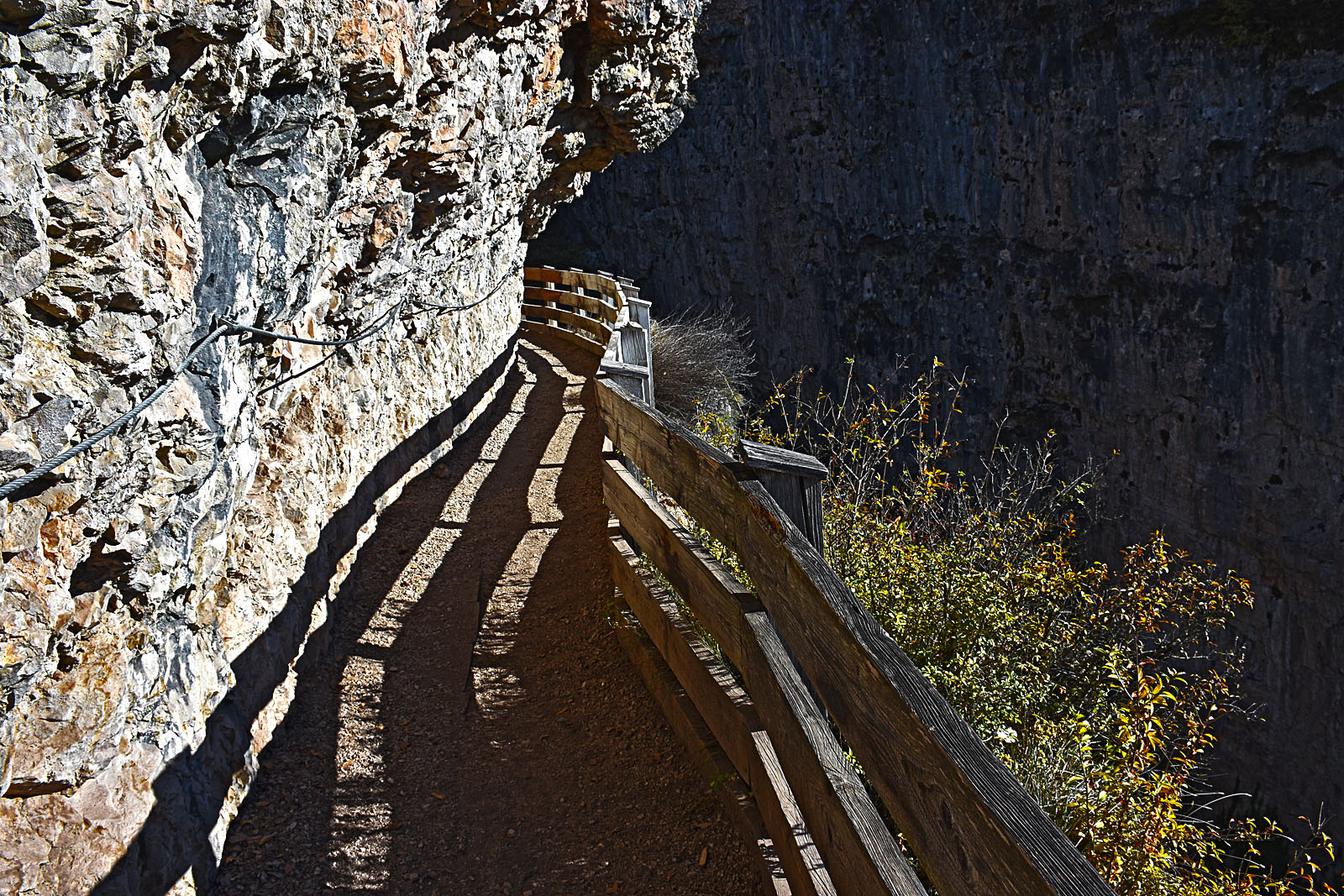
Sentiero delle forre di San Romedio

The sanctuary is accessible by car via Sanzeno, or on foot along the sentiero delle forre di San Romedio, an arduous route along a former aqueduct constructed in the mid-19th century for irrigation, recently converted into a very steep footpath over the sheer ravine wall.
