= Paralithaioi =

Paralithaioi Παραληθαίοι
- Municipal unit
- Location within the regional unit

- Location within Greece
- Coordinates: 39°40′N 21°44′E
- Country: Greece
- Administrative region: Thessaly
- Regional unit: Trikala
- Municipality: Trikala

Area
  - Municipal unit: 98.1 km^{2} (37.9 sq mi)

Population (2021)
  - Municipal unit: 2,202
  - Municipal unit density: 22.4/km^{2} (58.1/sq mi)
- Time zone: UTC+2 (EET)
  - Summer (DST): UTC+3 (EEST)
- Vehicle registration: ΤΚ

Paralithaioi (Greek: Παραληθαίοι) is a former municipality in the Trikala regional unit, Thessaly, Greece. Since the 2011 local government reform it is part of the municipality Trikala, of which it is a municipal unit. The municipal unit has an area of 98.052 km^{2}. Population 2,202 (2021). The seat of the municipality was in Rizoma. The name of the municipality comes from its geographical position, para, παρά + Lithaeos river (meaning "the people around the Lithaeos river).
