= Quintian of Rodez =

French Roman Catholic saint

Saint Quintian
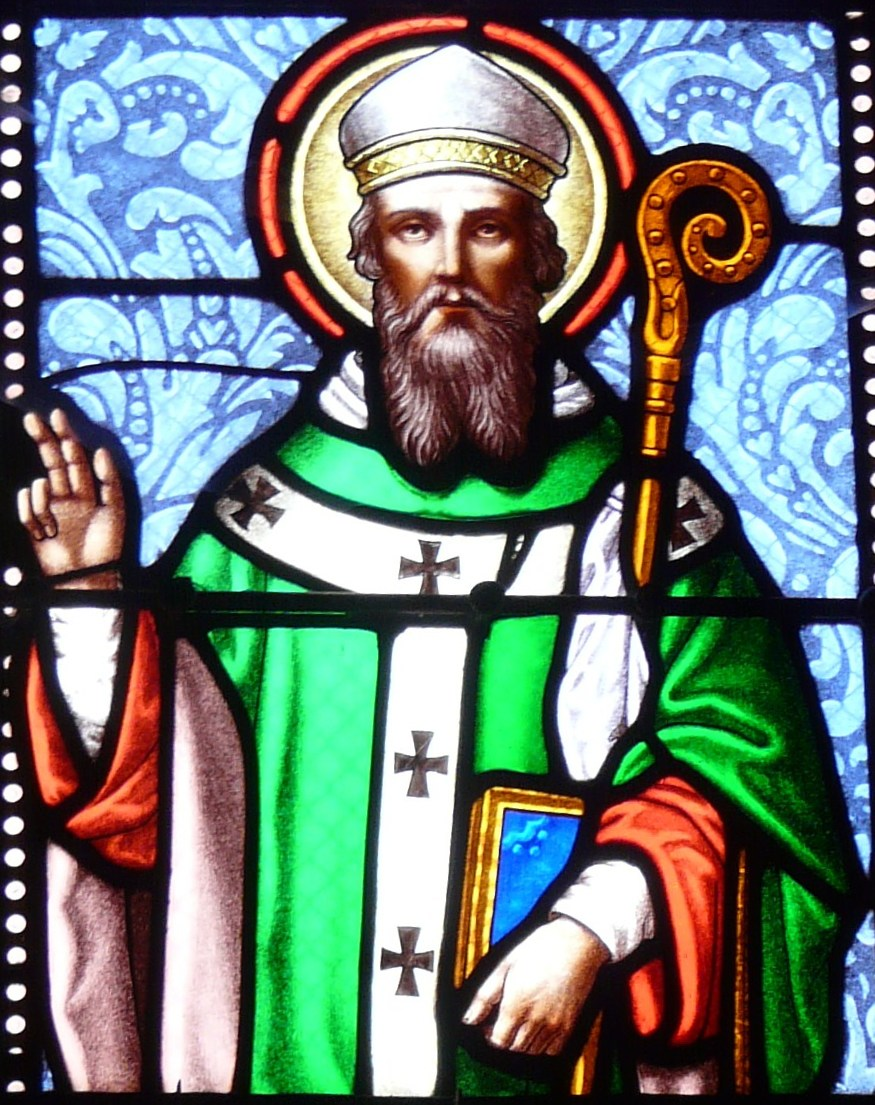

Bishop
- Born: 5th century Africa
- Died: ~525; France
- Venerated in: Roman Catholic Church; Eastern Orthodox Church; Anglican Communion
- Feast: November 13; June 14

Saint Quintian (Quintianus, Quinctianus, Quintien) (died ca. 525) was a bishop of Rodez and a bishop of Clermont-Ferrand (Arvernes) in the sixth century, and participated in the Councils of Agde (508) and Orleans (511).

== Life ==
Tradition makes him a native of Africa and a priest of Carthage who fled to France due to the persecutions of the Vandals. At the death of Saint Amantius (Amans) in 487, Quintian succeeded him as bishop of Rodez. During the war between the Franks and the West Goths, he was a zealous supporter of Clovis I. To avoid the persecutions of the Arian Visigoths, he fled Rodez and proceeded to Auvergne, where he was hospitably received by Bishop Euphrasius (Eufrèse). King Theodoric I appointed Quinctianus successor to Sidonius Apollinaris (grandson of the famous Sidonius Apollinaris), Bishop of Clermont. On the death of the latter, Quinctianus succeeded to the See of Clermont, which he occupied until his death on November 13, 525 or 526

== Veneration ==
His feast is celebrated on November 13, except at Rodez, where it is kept on June 14. In the "Roman Martyrology" his name stands under both dates.
