= Rizoma =

Rizoma Ρίζωμα
- Community
- Location within Greece
- Coordinates: 39°39′54″N 21°44′02″E
- Country: Greece
- Administrative region: Thessaly
- Regional unit: Trikala
- Municipality: Trikala
- Municipal unit: Paralithaioi

Population (2021)
  - Community: 790
- Time zone: UTC+2 (EET)
  - Summer (DST): UTC+3 (EEST)

Rizoma (Greek: Ρίζωμα, before 1927: Σκλάταινα - Sklataina) is a village in the Trikala regional unit, Thessaly, Greece. In the 2021 census it reported 790 residents. It lies at 160 meters above sea level, 12 km north of the city of Trikala. It has an agricultural economy with tobacco being the main product.

The village is the seat of the Paralithaioi municipal unit and it is inhabited by Karagounides, the most commonly used name for the residents of the Thessalian plain. According to local legend this name was given to them by Alexander the Great when he passed through the region in 335 BC on his way to Thebes. A more likely etymology, based on the prevalence of Slavic toponyms in the area, would be from slatina, meaning "marsh", with the /k/ added to break up the /sl/ consonant cluster, which is not native to the Greek language. See Σκλάβος

The most prominent figure that was born there was the priest-monk Saint Theophilus (mid-16th century) who is recorded as the founder of the Saint Stephen Monastery in Meteora.

To the north of the town, there is a low hill called Tzougza, where trenches dug in WW2 can still be seen.

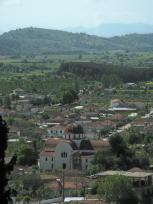
Rizoma in May 2008 showing its main church St Paraskevi.

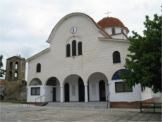
St Paraskevi

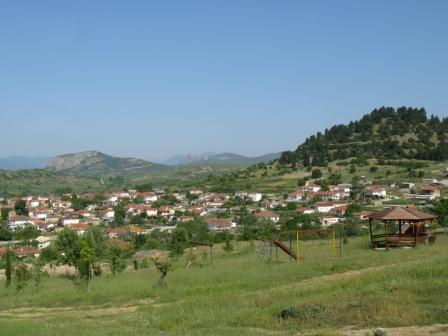
View of Rizoma looking North West from Bordovoullo hill. Tzougza hill visible at right of photo; Theopetra visible in the background; Meteora in the distance.

== Economy ==
Rizoma's economy has traditionally been agricultural. Villagers originally raised livestock alongside farming grain, legumes, vineyards, and garlic. Following a land redistribution in 1929, they specialized in tobacco cultivation, which became the area's main crop for decades. After European Union Common Agricultural Policy reforms restricted tobacco production, most tobacco fields were converted into olive groves, which are now the area's primary crop."
