= Stuart Karppinen =

Australian cricketer

Personal information
- Full name: Stuart James Karppinen
- Born: 13 June 1973 (age 53); Townsville, Queensland, Australia
- Batting: Right-handed
- Bowling: Right-arm medium
- Role: Bowler

Domestic team information
- Years: Team
- 1997/98: Australian Capital Territory
- 1999/00–2002/03: Western Australia

Career statistics
Competition	First-class	List A
Matches	3	18
Runs scored	22	101
Batting average	5.50	12.62
100s/50s	0/0	0/0
Top score	17	23
Balls bowled	558	806
Wickets	11	14
Bowling average	29.45	44.85
5 wickets in innings	0	0
10 wickets in match	0	0
Best bowling	4/110	2/35
Catches/stumpings	0/–	7/–
- Source: CricketArchive, 31 December 2012

Stuart James Karppinen (born 13 June 1973) is a former Australian cricketer who is also the former strength and conditioning coach of the Australian national cricket team. Born in Townsville, Karppinen moved to Canberra with his family at a young age. He played for the Australian Capital Territory Under-19s at the 1991–92 Barclays Bank Australian Under-19 Championships, taking one wicket in his only match. He was first selected for the Australian Capital Territory senior side during the 1993–94 season, although the ACT did not at the time have either first-class or List A status, and thus only played state teams' Second XIs and other sides touring Canberra. Karppinen was also the recipient of an Australian Institute of Sport scholarship in 1997. The Australian Capital Territory was admitted to the Australian domestic limited-overs competition for the 1997–98 season, playing as the "Canberra Comets". Karppinen played six matches for the team in their inaugural season, taking nine wickets with a best of 2/35. Karppinen did not play any matches the following season, and transferred to Western Australia for the 1999–2000 season.

Karppinen made his List A debut for Western Australia against South Australia during the 1999–2000 Mercantile Mutual Cup. He played 11 further matches for Western Australia, the last of which during the 2002–03 season, taking five wickets at an average of 78.00. Karppinen made his first-class debut for Western Australia against Victoria at the WACA Ground during the 2000–01 Pura Cup. He took 2/34 and 3/34 on debut, and made 1 and 17 batting. He did not play another first-class match that season, and only played two further first-class matches, both against touring international sides: against South Africa during the 2001–02 season, against whom he recorded his best bowling analysis of 4/110 off 26 overs; and against England during the 2002–03 season. He retired at the end of the 2002–03 season due to stress fractures in his back, and returned to Canberra. Karppinen subsequently studied sports science at the Cricket Australia Centre of Excellence and Charles Sturt University. He served as fitness coach for the Bangladesh national team between 2004 and 2006, before being recruited by New South Wales where he served as strength and conditioning coach. He was appointed strength and conditioning coach of the Australian national team from 2007 to 2011 and c.
