= Gil Gomes (journalist) =

Brazilian journalist (1940–2018)

- Gil Gomes in the 1990s
- Born: Cândido Gil Gomes Júnior; 13 June 1940; Sorocaba, São Paulo, Brazil
- Died: 16 October 2018 (aged 78); São Paulo, Brazil
- Occupations: Journalist, lawyer

Cândido Gil Gomes Júnior (13 June 1940 – 16 October 2018) was a Brazilian journalist and lawyer known for his dramatic crime reporting on radio and television. He worked on major radio networks such as Bandeirantes, Record, and Tupi, and later gained national prominence as a reporter for SBT's Aqui Agora, a newscast that pioneered a more informal and accessible journalistic style. His work helped establish the foundations of popular crime journalism in Brazil, a format that remains influential in the country's media to this day.

== Biography ==
Cândido Gil Gomes Júnior was born on June 13, 1940, in Sorocaba and raised in the Mooca neighborhood of São Paulo, the son of Portuguese immigrants. Gomes would listen to and imitate sports broadcasters on the radio as a means of overcoming his stutter, a childhood trauma. He discovered his vocation for communication when he was invited to serve as an announcer at church festivals. At the age of 18, he became a sports broadcaster at Rádio Progresso, and during the 1960s, he rose to the position of head of the journalism department at Rádio Marconi.

His career as a crime reporter commenced with his live coverage of a sexual assault case at the building housing his radio station. The prevailing military dictatorship, however, was intolerant of any criticism directed at police officers, and his station was viewed as hostile to the regime. Gomes later recounted that he and his team were arrested several times, though he was consistently able to secure their release owing to his personal connections with members of the police. In addition to facing pressure from the authorities, he was also threatened by criminals.

Following his tenure at Rádio Bandeirantes, Record, and Tupi, Gomes joined the reporting team of SBT's Aqui Agora. On the program, he was recognizable by his brightly colored shirts, his right hand gripping the microphone, and his left hand making a horizontal sweeping gesture. With his slow, deep voice, which intensified in dramatic moments, he reported directly from crime scenes using short, often incomplete sentences. He frequently grew emotional when interviewing victims and expressed outrage at perpetrators. His distinctive style led him to be hired by Record to play the role of one of the "teachers" on the comedy program Escolinha do Barulho and to make a special guest appearance on Chico Total, a program headlined by the comedian Chico Anysio.

After Aqui Agora went off the air in 1997 due to the emergence of competitors that caused it to lose its audience, he was hired by TV Gazeta the following year to work as a reporter for the program Mulheres. Between 2004 and 2005, he served as a reporter and presenter for the program Repórter Cidadão on RedeTV!. In 2005, he was diagnosed with Parkinson's disease, briefly returning to television on TV Ultrafarma. He passed away at Hospital São Paulo on October 16, 2018, after having battled liver cancer since 2015.
