= Aquilina =

Christian child martyr and saint (died 293)

Saint Aquilina of Byblos
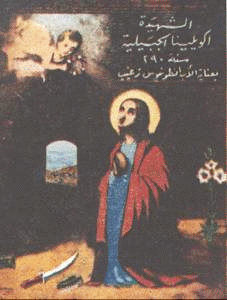

Child Martyr
- Born: 281; Byblos
- Died: June 13, 293
- Venerated in: Roman Catholic Church; Eastern Orthodox Church
- Feast: June 13

Aquilina (281–293) was a Christian child from Byblos who suffered martyrdom under Emperor Diocletian in the third century.

== Introduction ==
Between 63 BC and AD 330, Byblos was under Roman rule, and although Christianity existed in Byblos from the time of the Apostles, Christians were a minority among the majority of pagans. During their rule, the Romans not only strengthened the worship of idols, but some of their governors actively persecuted the Christians.

== Life ==
St. Aquilina, a native of the Phoenician city of Byblos. Her father's name was Eutolmius. She was raised in Christian piety by her parents. She received her catechism from Evthalios, Bishop of Byblos. When she was only twelve years old, she persuaded a pagan friend to convert to Christ through her example and teachings.

One of the servants of Governor Volusian accused her of teaching others to reject paganism. She was taken before the governor where she firmly confessed her belief in Christ and said that she would not renounce Him. Volusian tried to influence her through persuasion and flattery, but seeing her confidence, he ordered her to be tortured.

She was struck upon the face, then stripped and flogged. Heated metal rods were then drilled through her ears, and St. Aquilina fell down as if dead. The torturers thought that she had actually died, and gave orders that her body be thrown outside the city to be eaten by dogs. However, later that night, an angel appeared to Aquilina, roused her and said, “Arise and be healed. Go and denounce Volusian, so that he and his plans may come to nothing.”

Aquilina regained consciousness and went before the magistrate, who sentenced her to be decapitated in the morning, saying that she was a sorceress who refused his imperial decrees. Before the executioner could carry out the sentence, the martyr gave up her spirit. The Christians buried her body outside the city where her tomb became a site for pilgrimage and cures.

Later her holy relics were transported to Constantinople where a great basilica was built in her honor near the Forum of Constantine in the Philoxene quarter. This basilica was later destroyed in a fire.
