= Felicula =

4th century Christian martyr and saint

Saint Felicula
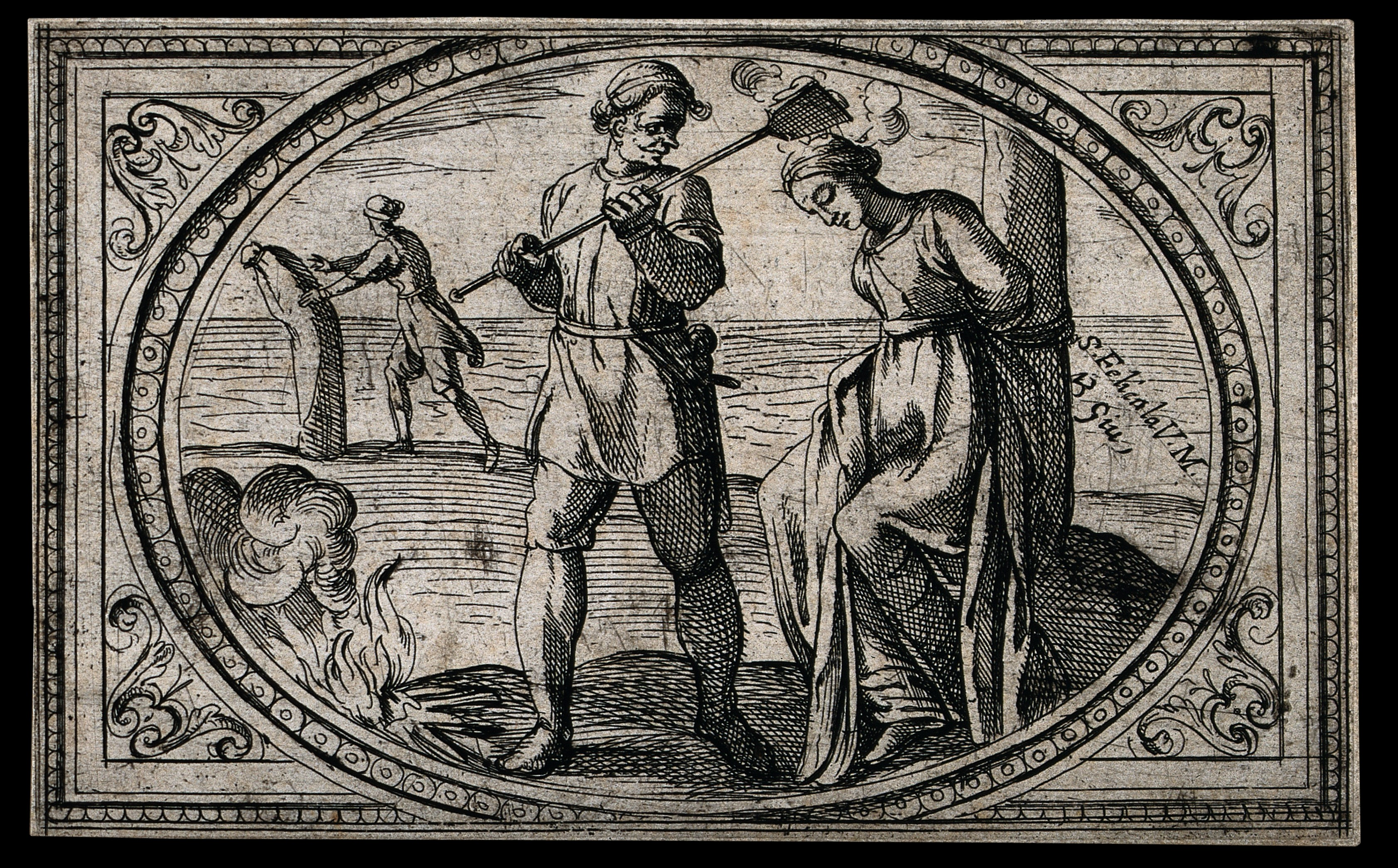

Martyr
- Venerated in: Roman Catholic Church, Orthodox Church, True Orthodox Church
- Feast: 13 June

Felicula was a probably fourth-century Roman martyr whose relics Pope Gregory I gave to Bishop John of Ravenna in about 592. She is mentioned in the Roman Martyrology on 13 June: "On the seventh milestone from the city of Rome on the Via Ardeatina, Saint Felicula, martyr".

The heavily romanticized Acts of Saints Nereus and Achilleus make of Felicula one of the first virgin martyrs and assign her death to about 90 AD. In this legend she was the foster sister of Saint Petronilla and was arrested after Petronilla refused to marry a Roman official. After Petronilla's death, Felicula had no food and water in prison. She was thrown into a sewer, where she eventually died. Saint Nicomedes recovered her body.
