= Damnat =

6th-century Irish saint

Saint Damnat

Virgin
- Residence: Tydavnet, Ireland
- Died: Tydavnet, Ireland
- Attributes: staff

Saint Damnat (Irish: Damhnait; also known as Davnet or Dymphna) was a nun who seems to have lived and died at Tydavnet (from Tech nDamnat, meaning "House of Damnat") at Sliabh Beagh, County Monaghan, Ireland. Tradition speaks of Saint Damnat as a virgin and the founder of a church or monastery, which is generally considered to have been located in the graveyard of the current village Catholic church. A bachall (staff) said to have belonged to her has been preserved; in the past, it was used as a lie detector. It is now in the National Museum of Ireland in Dublin.

She is sometimes confused with Dymphna, the saint of Geel in Flanders, since John Colgan identified them as the same person in the mid-seventeenth century. Both George Petrie and John O'Donovan of the antiquities division of the Ordnance Survey c.1830/40s doubted the link between the two names.
