= Psalmodius =

7th-century Christian hermit

Saint Psalmodius
- Born: Scotia (Ireland or Scotland)
- Died: ~690; France
- Venerated in: Roman Catholic Church
- Feast: 8 March; 13 June; 14 June; 15 June; 6 August; 24 November; 6 October
- Patronage: Eymoutiers

Saint Psalmodius, also known as Psalmet, Sauman, Saumay, was a 7th-century Christian hermit. Assumed to have been born to a noble family of Scotia, he became a disciple of Saint Brendan as a young boy. Psalmodius, whose original Celtic name is unknown, is said to have been lost at sea (perhaps the Atlantic Ocean) for three days as a young boy.

According to the legend, Psalmodius had fallen asleep on the beach, and was resting on a small raft during a day in which he had been playing with his friends. He was swept out to sea, and, encircled by large waves, he prayed for divine assistance; God raised an island in the ocean to prevent the young boy from drowning.

Gaufredus (Geoffroi), a cenobite of the Abbey of Saint Martial, Limoges, wrote an account of Psalmodius’ life, and writes that Psalmodius was a contemporary of St. Gregory the Great.

According to this account of Psalmodius' life, St. Brendan convinced Psalmodius to journey with him to Gaul, and around 630 AD, they arrived at Saintonge, where they were received by Saint Leontius, bishop of Saintes. Psalmodius became a student of Leontius. Leontius subsequently advised Psalmodius to take up a life of solitude and contemplation.

Psalmodius became a hermit in a small cell in the forest of Grigeas or Grie, in the Limousin near Eymoutiers. He acquired the name of Psalmodius (his original Celtic name is unknown) because he loved to sing psalms.

Numerous miracles were attributed to Psalmodius. As a hermit with a reputation for sanctity, Psalmodius is said to have had power over wild beasts and demons. He restored a blind woman to sight and healed the Duke of Aquitaine's daughter, who had been bitten by a viper. Once, a wolf ate the donkey that Psalmodius used to carry burdens; Psalmodius ordered the wolf to replace the donkey as his beast of burden (a similar tale is told of Saint Romedius). He also rescued a man who had been swallowed up by a snake.

It is said that Psalmodius died on the Ides of June (i.e. the middle of June), but the actual year is unknown.

== Veneration ==
When Psalmodius died, he was buried on the banks of the Vienne River. A church was built over his tomb; later a monastery was attached to it. The monastery was at the foot of the hill (“ayen-moutiers”), a description that turned into the place-name of Eymoutiers.

Psalmodius’ relics were placed in a silver shrine at the collegiate church associated with the monastery of Eymoutiers.

An ancient Breviary associated with the diocese of Limoges includes the feast days of Psalmodius and Anthony of Padua, listed on 13 June. Psalmodius’ Office was celebrated under a Double Rite, and the saint’s name appears in the Kalendar of Limoges, in the Menology of David Camerarius, in the Martyrology of Andrew Saussay, in the work of Ferrarius, in the work of Simon Martin, in the work of the Bollandists, and in the work of the Petits Bollandistes.
