= May 31 =

May 31 this year in various calendars
- Sunday, 31 May 2026
| Akan | Nkyikwasi |
| Armenian | 15 Margach 1475 |
| Aztec | Teotleco 1, 12 Ātl |
| Babylonian | 13 Ayaru, 2337 SE |
| Balinese pawukon | Menga, Kajeng, Sri, Pon, Urukung, Redite of Julungwangi, Sri, Dadi, Suka |
| Bengali | 17 Joishtho, BS 1433 |
| Chinese | Yin Wood Snake・Room Mansion; Fire Horse Year, Month 4, Day 15 (Xiaoman, 5 days until Mangzhong) |
| Common Era | 31 May 2026 CE |
| Coptic | 23 Pashons, AM 1742 |
| Egyptian | 15 Phaophi, 2775 NE |
| Ethiopian | 23 Genbot, 2018 Amätä Məhrät |
| French Republican | Décade II, Duodi de Prairial de l'Année 234 de la République |
| Gregorian | 31 May, AD 2026 |
| Hebrew | 15 Sivan, AM 5786 |
| Hindu | Anurādhā・Śiva; Solar: 17 Jyeṣṭha, 1948 SE; Lunisolar: Pūrṇimā, Śukla pakṣa of Adhika Jyeṣṭha, 2083 VE; Rāudra・5127 KY・1,872,726 |
| Icelandic | Sunnudagur, 9 Skerpla 2026 |
| Islamic | 14 Dhu al-Hijjah, AH 1447 (using tabular method) |
| ISO week date | 2026-W22-7 |
| Japanese | 15 Uzuki, Reiwa 8 (Shōman, 6 days until Bōshu) |
| Julian | 18 May, AD 2026 (AM 7534) |
| Julian day | 2461192 |
| Korean | 15 Baemdal, 4359 DE |
| Maya | 13.0.13.11.9; 2 Zotz, 12 Muluc |
| Roman | ante diem XV Kalendas Iunias, MMDCCLXXIX AUC |
| Solar Hijri | 10 Khordad, SH 1405 |
| Tibetan | 15 sa ga, me pho rta 2153 or 1772 or 1000 |

| << | May | | | | | >> |
| Su | Mo | Tu | We | Th | Fr | Sa |
| | | | | | 1 | 2 |
| 3 | 4 | 5 | 6 | 7 | 8 | 9 |
| 10 | 11 | 12 | 13 | 14 | 15 | 16 |
| 17 | 18 | 19 | 20 | 21 | 22 | 23 |
| 24 | 25 | 26 | 27 | 28 | 29 | 30 |
| 31 |
2026

May 31 in recent years
2026 (Sunday)
2025 (Saturday)
2024 (Friday)
2023 (Wednesday)
2022 (Tuesday)
2021 (Monday)
2020 (Sunday)
2019 (Friday)
2018 (Thursday)
2017 (Wednesday)

May 31 is the 151st day of the year (152nd in leap years) in the Gregorian calendar; 214 days remain until the end of the year.

== Events ==
=== Pre-1600 ===
- 455 – Emperor Petronius Maximus is stoned to death by an angry mob while fleeing Rome.
- 1215 – Zhongdu (now Beijing), then under the control of the Jurchen ruler Emperor Xuanzong of Jin, is captured by the Mongols under Genghis Khan, ending the Battle of Zhongdu.
- 1223 – Mongol invasion of the Cumans: Battle of the Kalka River: Mongol armies of Genghis Khan led by Subutai defeat Kievan Rus' and Cumans.
- 1293 – Mongols depart Java after the failed Mongol invasion against King Kertanegara of Singhasari.
- 1578 – King Henry III lays the first stone of the Pont Neuf (New Bridge), the oldest bridge of Paris, France.

=== 1601–1900 ===
- 1610 – The pageant London's Love to Prince Henry on the River Thames celebrates the creation of Prince Henry as Prince of Wales.
- 1669 – Citing poor eyesight as a reason, Samuel Pepys records the last event in his diary.
- 1775 – American Revolution: The Mecklenburg Resolves are adopted in the Province of North Carolina.
- 1790 – Manuel Quimper explores the Strait of Juan de Fuca.
- 1790 – The United States enacts its first copyright statute, the Copyright Act of 1790.
- 1795 – French Revolution: The Revolutionary Tribunal is suppressed.
- 1805 – French and Spanish forces begin the assault against British forces occupying Diamond Rock, Martinique.
- 1813 – In Australia, William Lawson, Gregory Blaxland and William Wentworth reach Mount Blaxland, effectively marking the end of a route across the Blue Mountains.
- 1847 – Qajar Iran and the Ottoman Empire determine their international boundary in the second treaty of Erzurum.
- 1859 – The Great Clock at the Houses of Parliament (now known as the Elizabeth Tower) starts keeping time.
- 1862 – American Civil War: Peninsula Campaign: Confederate forces under Joseph E. Johnston and G.W. Smith engage Union forces under George B. McClellan outside the Confederate capital of Richmond, Virginia.
- 1864 – American Civil War: Overland Campaign: Battle of Cold Harbor: The Army of Northern Virginia engages the Army of the Potomac.
- 1879 – Gilmore's Garden in New York City is renamed Madison Square Garden by William Henry Vanderbilt and is opened to the public at 26th Street and Madison Avenue.
- 1884 – The arrival at Plymouth of Tāwhiao, King of Maoris, to claim the protection of Queen Victoria.
- 1889 – Johnstown Flood: Over 2,200 people die after a dam fails and sends a 60-foot (18-meter) wall of water over the town of Johnstown, Pennsylvania.

=== 1901–present ===
- 1902 – Second Boer War: The Treaty of Vereeniging ends the war and ensures British control of South Africa.
- 1906 – The attempted regicide of Spanish King Alfonso XIII and Queen Victoria Eugenie on their wedding day instead kills 24.
- 1909 – The National Negro Committee, forerunner to the National Association for the Advancement of Colored People (NAACP), convenes for the first time.
- 1910 – The South Africa Act comes into force, establishing the Union of South Africa.
- 1911 – The RMS Titanic is launched in Belfast, Northern Ireland.
- 1911 – The President of Mexico Porfirio Díaz flees the country during the Mexican Revolution.
- 1916 – World War I: Battle of Jutland: The British Grand Fleet engages the High Seas Fleet in the largest naval battle of the war, which proves indecisive.
- 1921 – The Tulsa race massacre kills at least 39, but other estimates of black fatalities vary from 55 to about 300.
- 1924 – Hope Development School fire kills 24 people, mostly disabled children.
- 1935 – A 7.7 M_{w} earthquake destroys Quetta in modern-day Pakistan killing 40,000.
- 1941 – Anglo-Iraqi War: The United Kingdom completes the re-occupation of Iraq and returns 'Abd al-Ilah to power as regent for Faisal II.
- 1942 – World War II: Imperial Japanese Navy midget submarines begin a series of attacks on Sydney, Australia.
- 1947 – Ferenc Nagy, the democratically elected Prime Minister of Hungary, resigns from office after blackmail from the Hungarian Communist Party accusing him of being part of a plot against the state. This grants the Communists effective control of the Hungarian government.
- 1951 – The Uniform Code of Military Justice takes effect as the legal system of the United States Armed Forces.
- 1955 – The U.S. Supreme Court expands on its Brown v. Board of Education decision by ordering district courts and school districts to enforce educational desegregation "at all deliberate speed."
- 1961 – The South African Constitution of 1961 becomes effective, thus creating the Republic of South Africa, which remains outside the Commonwealth of Nations until 1 June 1994, when South Africa is returned to Commonwealth membership.
- 1961 – In Moscow City Court, the Rokotov–Faibishenko show trial begins, despite the Khrushchev Thaw to reverse Stalinist elements in Soviet society.
- 1962 – The West Indies Federation dissolves.
- 1970 – The 7.9 M_{w} Ancash earthquake shakes Peru with a maximum Mercalli intensity of VIII (Severe) and a landslide buries the town of Yungay, Peru. Between 66,794 and 70,000 were killed and 50,000 were injured.
- 1971 – In accordance with the Uniform Monday Holiday Act passed by the U.S. Congress in 1968, observation of Memorial Day occurs on the last Monday in May for the first time, rather than on the traditional Memorial Day of May 30.
- 1973 – The United States Senate votes to cut off funding for the bombing of Khmer Rouge targets within Cambodia, hastening the end of the Cambodian Civil War.
- 1973 – Indian Airlines Flight 440 crashes near Palam Airport in Delhi, killing 48.
- 1977 – The Trans-Alaska Pipeline System is completed.
- 1985 – United States–Canada tornado outbreak: Forty-one tornadoes hit Ohio, Pennsylvania, New York, and Ontario, leaving 76 dead.
- 1986 – The Ariane 2 rocket is launched on its maiden flight, carrying Intelsat VA F-14, but the mission ends in failure.
- 1991 – Bicesse Accords in Angola lay out a transition to multi-party democracy under the supervision of the United Nations' UNAVEM II peacekeeping mission.
- 1997 – The Confederation Bridge opens, linking Prince Edward Island with mainland New Brunswick.
- 2003 – Air France retires its fleet of Concorde aircraft.
- 2005 – Vanity Fair reveals that Mark Felt was "Deep Throat".
- 2008 – Usain Bolt breaks the world record in the 100m sprint, with a wind-legal (+1.7 m/s) 9.72 seconds.
- 2008 – Space Shuttle Discovery launches on STS-124 carrying the second portion of the Japanese Kibō module to the International Space Station.
- 2010 – Israeli Shayetet 13 commandos board the Gaza Freedom Flotilla while still in international waters trying to break the ongoing blockade of the Gaza Strip; nine Turkish citizens on the flotilla were killed in the ensuing violent affray.
- 2013 – The asteroid 1998 QE2 and its moon make their closest approach to Earth for the next two centuries.
- 2013 – A record breaking 2.6 mile wide tornado strikes near El Reno, Oklahoma, United States, causing eight fatalities (including three storm chasers) and over 150 injuries.
- 2016 – Syrian civil war: The Syrian Democratic Forces (SDF) launch the Manbij offensive, in order to capture the city of Manbij from the Islamic State of Iraq and the Levant (ISIL).
- 2017 – A car bomb explodes in a crowded intersection in Kabul near the German embassy during rush hour, killing over 90 and injuring 463.
- 2019 – A shooting occurs inside a municipal building at Virginia Beach, Virginia, leaving 13 people dead, including the shooter, and four others injured.
- 2026 – An explosion at a Ta'ang National Liberation Army base kills 46 people.

== Births ==
=== Pre-1600 ===
- 1443 (or 1441) – Margaret Beaufort, Countess of Richmond and Derby (died 1509)
- 1462 – Philipp II, Count of Hanau-Lichtenberg (died 1504)
- 1469 – Manuel I of Portugal (died 1521)
- 1535 – Alessandro Allori, Italian painter (died 1607)
- 1556 – Jerzy Radziwiłł, Catholic cardinal (died 1600)
- 1577 – Nur Jahan, Empress consort of the Mughal Empire (died 1645)

=== 1601–1900 ===
- 1613 – John George II, Elector of Saxony (died 1680)
- 1640 – Michał Korybut Wiśniowiecki, King of Poland (died 1673)
- 1641 – Patriarch Dositheos II of Jerusalem (died 1707)
- 1725 – Ahilyabai Holkar, Queen of the Malwa Kingdom under the Maratha Empire (died 1795)
- 1732 – Count Hieronymus von Colloredo, Austrian archbishop (died 1812)
- 1753 – Pierre Victurnien Vergniaud, French lawyer and politician (died 1793)
- 1754 – Andrea Appiani, Italian painter and educator (died 1817)
- 1773 – Ludwig Tieck, German poet, author, and critic (died 1853)
- 1801 – Johann Georg Baiter, Swiss philologist and scholar (died 1887)
- 1812 – Robert Torrens, Irish-Australian politician, 3rd Premier of South Australia (died 1884)
- 1815 – Adye Douglas, English-Australian cricketer and politician, 15th Premier of Tasmania (died 1906)
- 1818 – John Albion Andrew, American lawyer and politician, 25th Governor of Massachusetts (died 1867)
- 1819 – Walt Whitman, American poet, essayist, and journalist (died 1892)
- 1827 – Kusumoto Ine, first Japanese female doctor of Western medicine (died 1903)
- 1835 – Hijikata Toshizō, Japanese commander (died 1869)
- 1838 – Henry Sidgwick, English economist and philosopher (died 1900)
- 1842 – John Cox Bray, Australian politician, 15th Premier of South Australia (died 1894)
- 1847 – William Pirrie, 1st Viscount Pirrie, Canadian-Irish businessman and politician, Lord Mayor of Belfast (died 1924)
- 1852 – Francisco Moreno, Argentinian explorer and academic (died 1919)
- 1852 – Julius Richard Petri, German microbiologist, invented the Petri dish (died 1921)
- 1857 – Pope Pius XI (died 1939)
- 1858 – Graham Wallas, English socialist, social psychologist, and educationalist (died 1932)
- 1860 – Walter Sickert, English painter (died 1942)
- 1863 – Francis Younghusband, Indian-English captain and explorer (died 1942)
- 1866 – John Ringling, American entrepreneur; one of the founders of the Ringling Brothers Circus (died 1936)
- 1875 – Rosa May Billinghurst, British suffragette and women's rights activist (died 1953)
- 1879 – Frances Alda, New Zealand-Australian soprano (died 1952)
- 1882 – Sándor Festetics, Hungarian politician, Hungarian Minister of War (died 1956)
- 1883 – Lauri Kristian Relander, Finnish politician, 2nd President of Finland (died 1942)
- 1885 – Robert Richards, Australian politician, 32nd Premier of South Australia (died 1967)
- 1887 – Saint-John Perse, French poet and diplomat, Nobel Prize laureate (died 1975)
- 1892 – Michel Kikoine, Belarusian-French painter (died 1968)
- 1892 – Erich Neumann, German lieutenant and politician (died 1951)
- 1892 – Konstantin Paustovsky, Russian poet and author (died 1968)
- 1892 – Gregor Strasser, German lieutenant and politician (died 1934)
- 1894 – Fred Allen, American comedian, radio host, game show panelist, and author (died 1956)
- 1898 – Norman Vincent Peale, American minister and author (died 1993)
- 1900 – Lucile Godbold, American athlete (died 1981)

=== 1901–present ===
- 1901 – Alfredo Antonini, Italian-American conductor and composer (died 1983)
- 1908 – Don Ameche, American actor (died 1993)
- 1909 – Art Coulter, Canadian-American ice hockey player (died 2000)
- 1911 – Maurice Allais, French economist and physicist, Nobel Prize laureate (died 2010)
- 1912 – Chien-Shiung Wu, Chinese-American experimental physicist (died 1997)
- 1912 – Henry M. "Scoop" Jackson, American politician (died 1983)
- 1912 – Martin Schwarzschild, German-American astrophysicist (died 1997)
- 1914 – Akira Ifukube, Japanese composer and educator (died 2006)
- 1916 – Bert Haanstra, Dutch director, producer, and screenwriter (died 1997)
- 1918 – Robert Osterloh, American actor (died 2001)
- 1918 – Lloyd Quarterman, African American chemist (died 1982)
- 1919 – Robie Macauley, American editor, novelist and critic (died 1995)
- 1921 – Edna Doré, English actress (died 2014)
- 1921 – Andrew Grima, Anglo-Italian jewellery designer (died 2007)
- 1921 – Howard Reig, American radio and television announcer (died 2008)
- 1921 – Alida Valli, Austrian-Italian actress and singer (died 2006)
- 1922 – Denholm Elliott, English-Spanish actor (died 1992)
- 1923 – Ellsworth Kelly, American painter and sculptor (died 2015)
- 1923 – Rainier III, Prince of Monaco (died 2005)
- 1923 – Claudio Matteini, Italian football player (died 2003)
- 1925 – Julian Beck, American actor and director (died 1986)
- 1927 – James Eberle, English admiral (died 2018)
- 1927 – Michael Sandberg, Baron Sandberg, English lieutenant and banker (died 2017)
- 1928 – Pankaj Roy, Indian cricketer (died 2001)
- 1929 – Menahem Golan, Israeli director and producer (died 2014)
- 1930 – Clint Eastwood, American actor, director, musician, and producer
- 1930 – Elaine Stewart, American actress and model (died 2011)
- 1931 – John Robert Schrieffer, American physicist and academic, Nobel Prize laureate (died 2019)
- 1931 – Shirley Verrett, American soprano and actress (died 2010)
- 1932 – Ed Lincoln, Brazilian pianist, bassist, and composer (died 2012)
- 1932 – Jay Miner, American computer scientist and engineer (died 1994)
- 1933 – Henry B. Eyring, American religious leader, educator, and author
- 1934 – Jim Hutton, American actor (died 1979)
- 1935 – Jim Bolger, New Zealand businessman and politician, 35th Prime Minister of New Zealand (died 2025)
- 1938 – Johnny Paycheck, American singer-songwriter and guitarist (died 2003)
- 1938 – John Prescott, British sailor and politician, Deputy Prime Minister of the United Kingdom (died 2024)
- 1938 – Peter Yarrow, American singer-songwriter, guitarist, and producer (died 2025)
- 1939 – Terry Waite, English humanitarian and author
- 1940 – Anatoliy Bondarchuk, Ukrainian hammer thrower and coach (died 2025)
- 1940 – Augie Meyers, American musician and singer-songwriter
- 1940 – Gilbert Shelton, American illustrator
- 1941 – June Clark, Welsh nurse and educator
- 1941 – Louis Ignarro, American pharmacologist and academic, Nobel Prize laureate
- 1941 – William Nordhaus, American economist and academic, Nobel Prize laureate (died 2026)
- 1943 – Sharon Gless, American actress
- 1943 – Joe Namath, American football player, sportscaster, and actor
- 1945 – Rainer Werner Fassbinder, German actor, director, and screenwriter (died 1982)
- 1945 – Laurent Gbagbo, Ivorian academic and politician, 4th President of Côte d'Ivoire
- 1945 – Bernard Goldberg, American journalist and author
- 1946 – Ted Baehr, American publisher and critic
- 1946 – Steve Bucknor, Jamaican cricketer and umpire
- 1946 – Krista Kilvet, Estonian journalist, politician, and diplomat (died 2009)
- 1946 – Debbie Moore, English model and businesswoman
- 1947 – Junior Campbell, Scottish singer-songwriter, guitarist, and producer
- 1947 – Gabriele Hinzmann, German discus thrower
- 1948 – Svetlana Alexievich, Belarusian journalist and author, Nobel Prize laureate
- 1948 – John Bonham, English musician, songwriter and drummer (died 1980)
- 1948 – Martin Hannett, English bass player, guitarist, and record producer (died 1991)
- 1948 – Duncan Hunter, American lieutenant, lawyer, and politician
- 1949 – Tom Berenger, American actor, film producer and television writer
- 1950 – Jean Chalopin, French director, producer, and screenwriter, founded DIC Entertainment
- 1950 – Gregory Harrison, American actor
- 1950 – Christine Kurzhals, German politician (died 1998)
- 1950 – Edgar Savisaar, Estonian politician, Estonian Minister of the Interior (died 2022)
- 1951 – Karl-Hans Riehm, German hammer thrower
- 1952 – Carole Achache, French writer, photographer and actress (died 2016)
- 1952 – Karl Bartos, German singer-songwriter and keyboard player
- 1953 – Pirkka-Pekka Petelius, Finnish actor and screenwriter
- 1954 – Thomas Mavros, Greek footballer
- 1954 – Vicki Sue Robinson, American actress and singer (died 2000)
- 1955 – Tommy Emmanuel, Australian singer-songwriter and guitarist
- 1955 – Susie Essman, American actress, comedian, and screenwriter
- 1956 – Fritz Hilpert, German drummer and composer
- 1956 – John Young, English singer-songwriter and keyboard player
- 1957 – Jim Craig, American ice hockey player
- 1959 – Andrea de Cesaris, Italian race car driver (died 2014)
- 1959 – Phil Wilson, English politician
- 1960 – Greg Adams, Canadian ice hockey player and businessman
- 1960 – Chris Elliott, American actor, comedian, and screenwriter
- 1960 – Peter Winterbottom, English rugby player
- 1961 – Ray Cote, Canadian ice hockey player
- 1961 – Justin Madden, Australian footballer and politician
- 1961 – Lea Thompson, American actress, director, and producer
- 1962 – Dina Boluarte, Peruvian politician, 64th President of Peru
- 1962 – Corey Hart, Canadian singer-songwriter and producer
- 1963 – David Leigh, holder of the Sir Samuel Hall Chair of Chemistry at the University of Manchester
- 1963 – Viktor Orbán, Hungarian politician, 38th Prime Minister of Hungary
- 1963 – Wesley Willis, American singer-songwriter and keyboard player (died 2003)
- 1964 – Leonard Asper, Canadian lawyer and businessman
- 1964 – Stéphane Caristan, French hurdler and coach
- 1964 – Yukio Edano, Japanese politician, Japanese Minister for Foreign Affairs
- 1964 – Darryl "D.M.C." McDaniels, American rapper and producer
- 1965 – Brooke Shields, American model, actress, and producer
- 1966 – Diesel, American-Australian singer-songwriter and guitarist
- 1966 – Roshan Mahanama, Sri Lankan cricketer and referee
- 1967 – Phil Keoghan, New Zealand television host and producer
- 1967 – Kenny Lofton, American baseball player, coach, and sportscaster
- 1971 – Arun Luthra, Indo-Anglo-American saxophonist, konnakol artist, composer, and arranger
- 1972 – Frode Estil, Norwegian skier
- 1972 – Christian McBride, American bassist and record producer
- 1972 – Antti Niemi, Finnish international footballer and coach
- 1972 – Archie Panjabi, British actress
- 1972 – Dave Roberts, American baseball player and coach
- 1974 – Hiroiki Ariyoshi, Japanese comedian and singer
- 1975 – Mac Suzuki, Japanese baseball player
- 1976 – Colin Farrell, Irish actor
- 1976 – Matt Harpring, American basketball player and sportscaster
- 1977 – Domenico Fioravanti, Italian swimmer
- 1977 – Moses Sichone, Zambian footballer
- 1979 – Jean-François Gillet, Belgian footballer
- 1980 – Andy Hurley, American musician
- 1981 – Mikael Antonsson, Swedish footballer
- 1981 – Daniele Bonera, Italian footballer
- 1981 – Jake Peavy, American baseball player
- 1981 – Marlies Schild, Austrian skier
- 1982 – Brett Firman, Australian rugby league player
- 1984 – Andrew Bailey, American baseball player
- 1984 – Milorad Čavić, Serbian swimmer
- 1984 – Nate Robinson, American basketball player
- 1985 – Jordy Nelson, American football player
- 1986 – Waka Flocka Flame, American rapper
- 1986 – Robert Gesink, Dutch cyclist
- 1989 – Marco Reus, German footballer
- 1990 – Erik Karlsson, Swedish ice hockey player
- 1991 – Azealia Banks, American singer-songwriter and rapper
- 1992 – Michaël Bournival, Canadian ice hockey player
- 1992 – Laura Ikauniece, Latvian heptathlete
- 1992 – Jóhann Páll Jóhannsson, Icelandic politician
- 1995 – Shane Bieber, American baseball player
- 1995 – Matthew Lodge, Australian rugby league player
- 1996 – Normani Kordei Hamilton, American singer
- 1996 – Brandon Smith, New Zealand rugby league player
- 1997 – Woo Jin-young, South Korean singer and rapper
- 1997 – Jeong Se-woon, South Korean singer-songwriter
- 1998 – Santino Ferrucci, American race car driver
- 2000 – Gable Steveson, American wrestler
- 2001 – Breece Hall, American football player
- 2001 – Iga Świątek, Polish tennis player

== Deaths ==
=== Pre-1600 ===
- 455 – Petronius Maximus, Roman emperor (born 396)
- 930 – Liu Hua, princess of Southern Han (born 896)
- 960 – Fujiwara no Morosuke, Japanese statesman (born 909)
- 1076 – Waltheof, Earl of Northumbria, English politician (born 1050)
- 1089 – Sigwin von Are, archbishop of Cologne
- 1162 – Géza II, king of Hungary (born 1130)
- 1321 – Birger, king of Sweden (born 1280)
- 1326 – Maurice de Berkeley, 2nd Baron Berkeley (born 1271)
- 1329 – Albertino Mussato, Italian statesman and writer (born 1261)
- 1349 – Thomas Wake, English politician (born 1297)
- 1370 – Vitalis of Assisi, Italian hermit and monk (born 1295)
- 1408 – Ashikaga Yoshimitsu, Japanese shōgun (born 1358)
- 1410 – Martin of Aragon, Spanish king (born 1356)
- 1504 – Engelbert II of Nassau (born 1451)
- 1558 – Philip Hoby, English general and diplomat (born 1505)
- 1567 – Guido de Bres, Belgian pastor and theologian (born 1522)
- 1594 – Tintoretto, Italian painter and educator (born 1518)

=== 1601–1900 ===
- 1601 – Gebhard Truchsess von Waldburg, Archbishop-Elector of Cologne (born 1547)
- 1640 – Zeynab Begum, Safavid princess (date of birth unknown)
- 1665 – Pieter Jansz. Saenredam, Dutch painter (born 1597)
- 1680 – Joachim Neander, German theologian and educator (born 1650)
- 1740 – Frederick William I of Prussia (born 1688)
- 1747 – Andrey Osterman, German-Russian politician, Russian Minister of Foreign Affairs (born 1686)
- 1809 – Joseph Haydn, Austrian pianist and composer (born 1732)
- 1809 – Jean Lannes, French general (born 1769)
- 1831 – Samuel Bentham, English architect and engineer (born 1757)
- 1832 – Évariste Galois, French mathematician and theorist (born 1811)
- 1837 – Joseph Grimaldi, English actor, comedian and dancer (born 1779)
- 1846 – Philip Marheineke, German pastor and philosopher (born 1780)
- 1847 – Thomas Chalmers, Scottish minister and economist (born 1780)
- 1848 – Eugénie de Guérin, French author (born 1805)
- 1899 – Stefanos Koumanoudis, Greek archaeologist, teacher and writer (born 1818)

=== 1901–present ===
- 1908 – Louis-Honoré Fréchette, Canadian author, poet, and politician (born 1839)
- 1909 – Thomas Price, Welsh-Australian politician, 24th Premier of South Australia (born 1852)
- 1910 – Elizabeth Blackwell, English-American physician and educator (born 1821)
- 1931 – Felix-Raymond-Marie Rouleau, Canadian cardinal (born 1866)
- 1931 – Willy Stöwer, German author and illustrator (born 1864)
- 1945 – Odilo Globocnik, Italian-Austrian SS officer (born 1904)
- 1954 – Antonis Benakis, Greek art collector and philanthropist, founded the Benaki Museum (born 1873)
- 1957 – Stefanos Sarafis, Greek general and politician (born 1890)
- 1957 – Leopold Staff, Polish poet and academic (born 1878)
- 1960 – Willem Elsschot, Flemish author and poet (born 1882)
- 1960 – Walther Funk, German economist, journalist, and politician, German Minister of Economics (born 1890)
- 1962 – Henry F. Ashurst, American lawyer and politician (born 1874)
- 1967 – Billy Strayhorn, American pianist and composer (born 1915)
- 1970 – Terry Sawchuk, Canadian-American ice hockey player (born 1929)
- 1970 – Clare Sheridan, English sculptor and author (born 1885)
- 1976 – Jacques Monod, French biologist and geneticist, Nobel Prize laureate (born 1910)
- 1977 – William Castle, American actor, director, producer, and screenwriter (born 1914)
- 1978 – József Bozsik, Hungarian footballer and manager (born 1925)
- 1981 – Barbara Ward, Baroness Jackson of Lodsworth, English economist and journalist (born 1914)
- 1982 – Carlo Mauri, Italian mountaineer and explorer (born 1930)
- 1983 – Jack Dempsey, American boxer and lieutenant (born 1895)
- 1985 – Gaston Rébuffat, French mountaineer and author (born 1921)
- 1986 – Jane Frank, American painter and sculptor (born 1918)
- 1986 – James Rainwater, American physicist and academic, Nobel Prize laureate (born 1917)
- 1987 – John Abraham, Indian director and screenwriter (born 1937)
- 1989 – C. L. R. James, Trinidadian journalist and historian (born 1901)
- 1989 – Owen Lattimore, American author and academic (born 1900)
- 1993 – Honey Tree Evil Eye, or, Spuds MacKenzie, Bud Light Bull Terrier mascot (born 1983)
- 1994 – Uzay Heparı, Turkish actor, producer, and composer (born 1969)
- 1994 – Herva Nelli, Italian-American soprano (born 1909)
- 1995 – Stanley Elkin, American novelist, short story writer, and essayist (born 1930)
- 1996 – Timothy Leary, American psychologist and author (born 1920)
- 1998 – Charles Van Acker, Belgian-American race car driver (born 1912)
- 2000 – Petar Mladenov, Bulgarian diplomat, 1st President of Bulgaria (born 1936)
- 2000 – A. Jeyaratnam Wilson, Sri Lankan historian, author, and academic (born 1928)
- 2001 – Arlene Francis, American actress, talk show host, game show panelist, and television personality (born 1907)
- 2002 – Subhash Gupte, Indian cricketer (born 1929)
- 2004 – Aiyathurai Nadesan, Sri Lankan journalist (born 1954)
- 2004 – Robert Quine, American guitarist (born 1941)
- 2004 – Étienne Roda-Gil, French screenwriter and composer (born 1941)
- 2006 – Miguel Ortiz Berrocal, Spanish sculptor (born 1933)
- 2006 – Raymond Davis Jr., American physicist and chemist, Nobel Prize laureate (born 1914)
- 2009 – Danny La Rue, Irish-British drag queen performer and singer (born 1927)
- 2009 – George Tiller, American physician (born 1941)
- 2010 – Louise Bourgeois, French-American sculptor and painter (born 1911)
- 2010 – Brian Duffy, English photographer and producer (born 1933)
- 2010 – William A. Fraker, American director, producer, and cinematographer (born 1923)
- 2010 – Rubén Juárez, Argentinian singer-songwriter and bandoneón player (born 1947)
- 2010 – Merata Mita, New Zealand director, producer, and screenwriter (born 1942)
- 2011 – Pauline Betz, American tennis player (born 1919)
- 2011 – Jonas Bevacqua, American fashion designer, co-founded the Lifted Research Group (born 1977)
- 2011 – Derek Hodge, Virgin Islander lawyer and politician, Lieutenant Governor of the United States Virgin Islands (born 1941)
- 2011 – Hans Keilson, German-Dutch psychoanalyst and author (born 1909)
- 2011 – John Martin, English admiral and politician, Lieutenant Governor of Guernsey (born 1918)
- 2011 – Andy Robustelli, American football player and manager (born 1925)
- 2012 – Christopher Challis, English cinematographer (born 1919)
- 2012 – Randall B. Kester, American lawyer and judge (born 1916)
- 2012 – Paul Pietsch, German race car driver and publisher (born 1911)
- 2012 – Orlando Woolridge, American basketball player and coach (born 1959)
- 2013 – Gerald E. Brown, American physicist and academic (born 1926)
- 2013 – Frederic Lindsay, Scottish author and educator (born 1933)
- 2013 – Miguel Méndez, American author and poet (born 1930)
- 2013 – Tim Samaras, American engineer and storm chaser (born 1957)
- 2013 – Jairo Mora Sandoval, Costa Rican environmentalist (born 1987)
- 2013 – Jean Stapleton, American actress (born 1923)
- 2014 – Marilyn Beck, American journalist (born 1928)
- 2014 – Marinho Chagas, Brazilian footballer and coach (born 1952)
- 2014 – Hoss Ellington, American race car driver (born 1935)
- 2014 – Martha Hyer, American actress (born 1924)
- 2014 – Lewis Katz, American businessman and philanthropist (born 1942)
- 2014 – Mary Soames, Baroness Soames, English author (born 1922)
- 2015 – Gladys Taylor, Canadian author and publisher (born 1917)
- 2016 – Mohamed Abdelaziz, President of the Sahrawi Arab Democratic Republic (1976–2016) (born 1947)
- 2016 – Jan Crouch, American televangelist, co-founder of the Trinity Broadcasting Network (born 1938)
- 2016 – Carla Lane, English television writer (born 1928)
- 2016 – Rupert Neudeck, German journalist and humanitarian (born 1939)
- 2022 – Colin Cantwell, American concept artist and director (born 1932)
- 2022 – Krishnakumar Kunnath, Indian singer (born 1968)
- 2022 – Gilberto Rodríguez Orejuela, Colombian drug lord (born 1939)
- 2022 – Jim Parks, English cricketer (born 1931)
- 2024 – Robert Pickton, Canadian serial killer (born 1949)
- 2024 – Marian Robinson, mother of Michelle Obama (born 1937)
- 2025 – Stanley Fischer, Israeli-American economist (born 1943)

== Holidays and observances ==
- Anniversary of Royal Brunei Malay Regiment (Brunei)
- Christian feast day:
  - Blessed Camilla Battista da Varano
  - Cantius, Cantianus, and Cantianilla
  - Hermias
  - Blessed Mariano da Roccacasale
  - Petronella
  - Blessed Robert Thorpe
  - Visitation of Mary (Western Christianity)
  - May 31 (Eastern Orthodox liturgics)
- Kaamatan, harvest festival in the state of Sabah and the federal territory of Labuan (Malaysia)
- World No Tobacco Day (International)
- Borobi Day (Australia)

== Sources ==
- Ghereghlou, Kioumars (2016). "ZAYNAB BEGUM". Encyclopaedia Iranica. Archived from the original on 2017-01-17.
