= May 18 (Eastern Orthodox liturgics) =

Day in the Eastern Orthodox liturgical calendar

Eastern Orthodox liturgical calendar
May 17	May 18	May 19
May 18 O.S. ≍ May 31 N.S. May 18 N.S ≍ May 5 O.S.

An Eastern Orthodox cross

May 18 in Eastern Orthodox liturgical calendars is a feast day and a day of commemoration of saints and martyrs. Although some Orthodox churches use the Revised Julian Calendar and others use the traditional Julian calendar, the fixed commemorations for their respective May 18 are broadly the same, no matter which calendar is used. (Note: Despite the dates being the same, the days to which they refer typically differ by 13 days. The notation Old Style or O.S. is sometimes used to indicate a date in the traditional Julian Calendar (the "Old Calendar"). The notation New Style or N.S. indicates a date in the Revised Julian calendar (the "New Calendar").)

== Saints ==
- Martyrs Peter of Lampsacus, Andrew, Paul, Dionysius, and Christina, at Euridinos, under Decius (c. 249 - 251) (Note: Greek Synaxarions contain not 'Dionysia' but 'Dionysius', and additionally Christina.)
- Martyrs Heraclius, Paulinus, and Benedimus of Athens (250) (Note: See: (in Russian) Ираклий, Павлин и Венедим. Википедии. (Russian Wikipedia).)
- Martyr Euphrasia of Nicaea (c. 303)
- Martyr Galactia.
- Martyr Julian, by being dragged through thorns.
- Martyr Theodotus of Ancyra, and with him seven virgin-martyrs:

- Alexandra, Tecusa, Claudia, Phaine (Thaïna), Euphrasia, Matrona, and Julia (304) (Note: Name days celebrated today include: Julia (Ἰουλία); Julius (Ἰούλιος).) (see also: June 7 and November 6)

- Martyr Dioscorus, in Cynopolis of Egypt (305)
- Martyrs Symeon, Isaac, and Bachtisius of Persia (339) (Note: In the Greek Menaion these are commemorated on May 16.)
- Hieromartyr Potamon (Palæmon), Bishop of Heraclea in Egypt, (Note: Heracleopolis Parva, or Sethroë, in Lower Egypt, identified with the site of Tell Belim.) and Confessor (340)
- The holy clergy and lay martyrs massacred under Emperor Valens (364–378) (Note: When the pro-Arian Emperor Valens (364 to 378 AD) lived in Nicomedia, a committee of eighty Orthodox clergy visited him to talk about the issue of Arius. These Holy Martyrs had a martyric end, after having been put on a ship which was burned near Dakyvizi (or Dakymizi).)
- Martyrs David and Tarechan, of Georgia (693)
- Patriarch Stephen the New of Constantinople (893)
- Saint Anastaso (Anastasia) of Leukadion (or Laucation), near the Bithinian sea-shore.
- Saint Martinian of Areovinthus (Areobindus, Areovinchus), monk of the church of the Theotokos of the Areovinthus quarter, Constantinople.
- Hosios Stephanos the Chorabyte

== Pre-Schism Western saints ==
- Martyr Venantius of Camerino (250)
- Hieromartyr Felix, Bishop of Spoleto, in Umbria (304)
- Hieromartyr Pope John I of Rome (526)
- Hieromartyr Pope Theodore I of Rome, who was burned alive (649)
- Martyr Merililaun of Rheims (Merolilaun), a pilgrim murdered near Rheims and venerated as a martyr (8th century)
- Saint Feredarius (Feradach mac Cormaic), Abbot of Iona (c. 880)
- Saint Elgiva (Ælgifu), Widow of King Edmund, Abbess of Shaftesbury (944) (Note: "ELGIVA was the wife of King Edmund, and mother of his successors, Edwig and the great Edgar. She was a woman of many virtues, and greatly venerated for her piety and supernatural gifts. She abounded in alms-deeds and every good work, her sweetness and piety were obvious to all who beheld her, and she had an utter contempt of vain ornaments and dress. Elgiva had moreover the gift of prophecy in a remarkable degree, and by her prudent counsel was a main support to her illustrious son, Edgar, who held her in the highest respect. Through her liberality, the Monastery of Shaftesbury was rebuilt or enlarged, and in that sanctuary her sacred relics reposed. The name of the Saint in the ancient English language was Ælgifu, Elgiva or Algyva being the Latin form adopted by the chroniclers.")

== Post-Schism Orthodox saints ==
- Saint Macarius (Glukharev) of the Altai, Archimandrite (1847) (Note: See: (in Russian) Макарий (Глухарёв). Википедии. (Russian Wikipedia).)
- Saint John Gashkevich, Archpriest of Korma (1917) (Note: See: (in Russian) Иоанн Кормянский. Википедии. (Russian Wikipedia).)

=== New martyrs and confessors ===
- New Hieromartyr Michael Vinogradov, priest (1932)
- New Hieromartyr Damian (Damjan) Strbac, Jr., priest of Grahovo, Serbia (1941) (Note: See: (in Serbian) Дамјан Штрбац. Википедије (Serbian Wikipedia).)
- New Hieromartyr Basil Krylov, priest (1942)

== Other commemorations ==
- Commemoration of the Holy Fathers of the Seven Ecumenical Councils.
- Translation of the relics (1030) of Saint Mildred of Thanet (Mildthryth), Abbess of Minster-in-Thanet (8th century)
- Repose of Blessed Philip (Khorev), founder of the Gethsemane Caves Skete of St. Sergius Lavra (1869) (Note: See: (in Russian) Филипп (Хорев). Википедии. (Russian Wikipedia).)

== Icon gallery ==
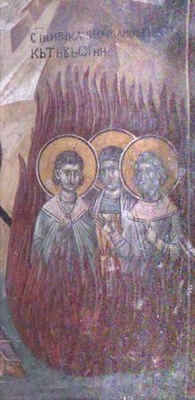
Martyrs Heraclius, Paulinus, and Benedimus of Athens.

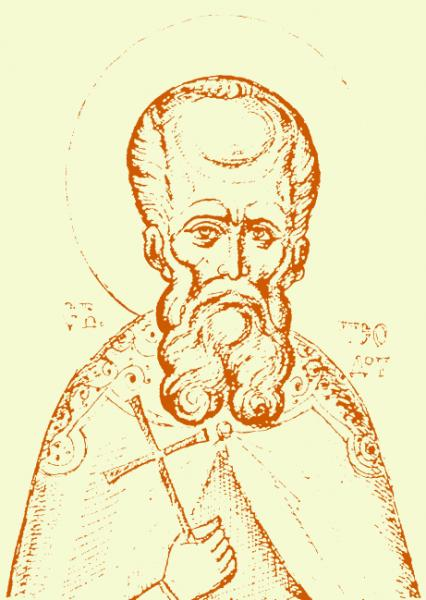
Martyr Theodotus of Ancyra.

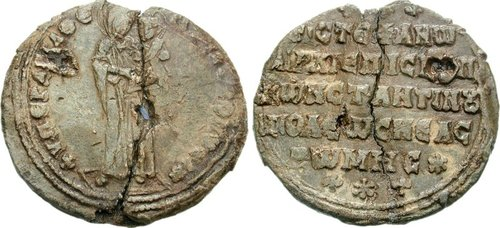
Seal of "Stephen, Patriarch of Constantinople and New Rome"
(i.e. either of Stephen I or II).

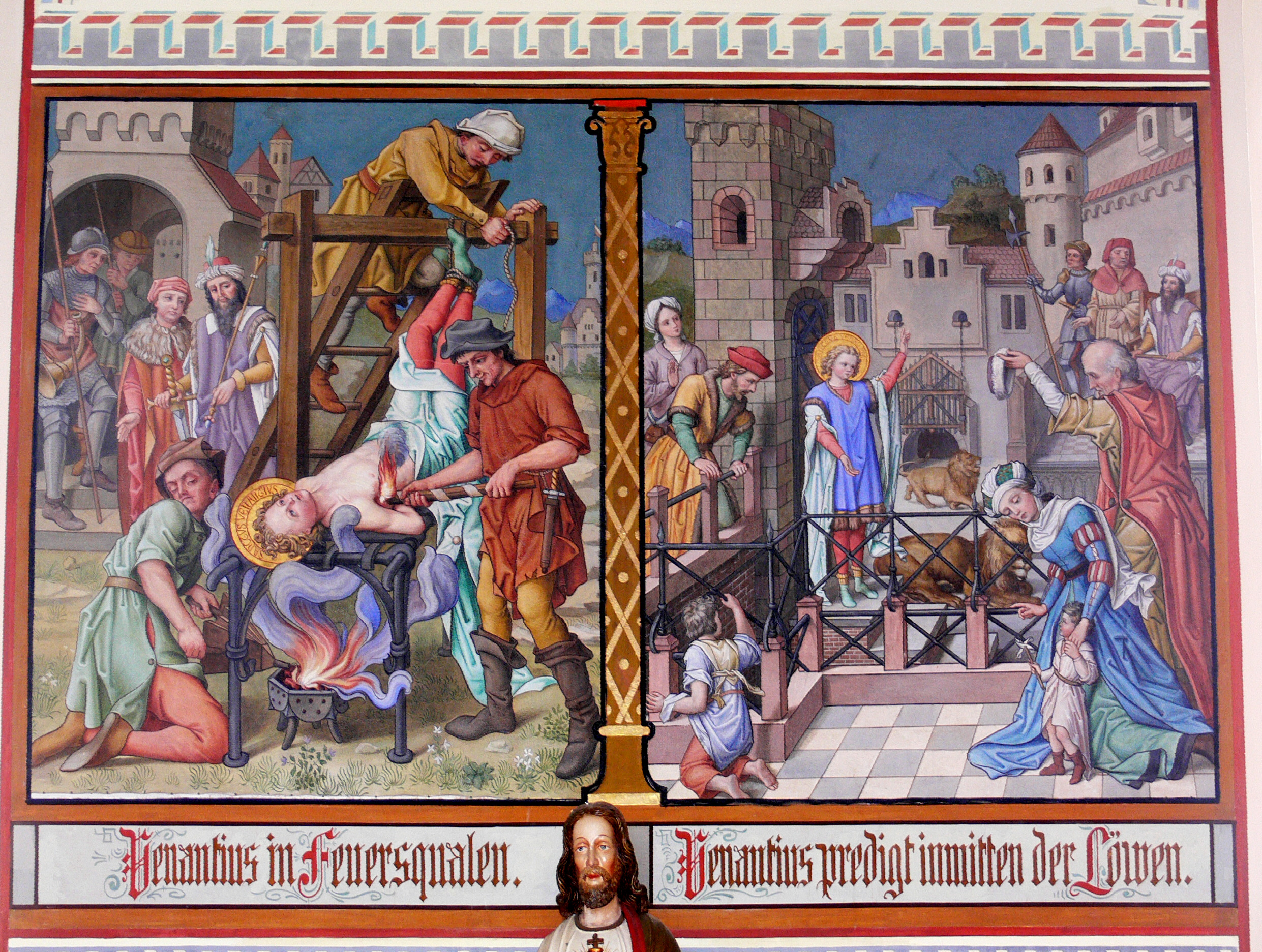
St. Venantius of Camerino is hung upside-down over a fire, and then thrown to the lions.

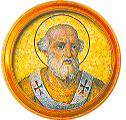
Pope John I.

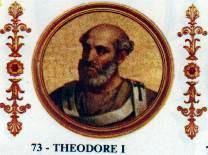
Pope Theodore I.

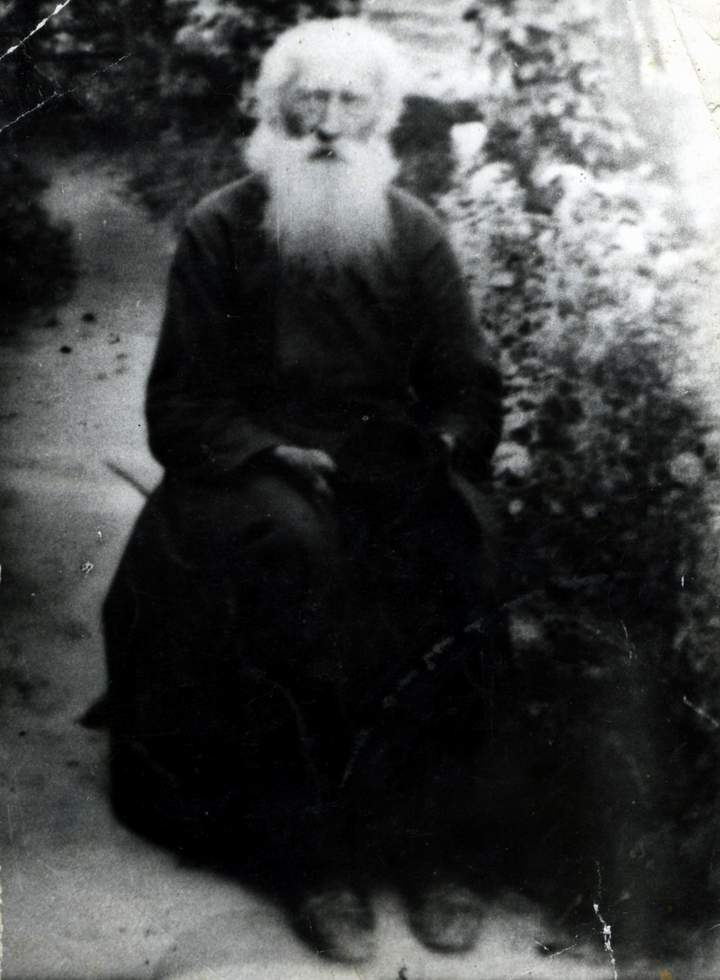
St. John Gashkevich, Archpriest of Korma.

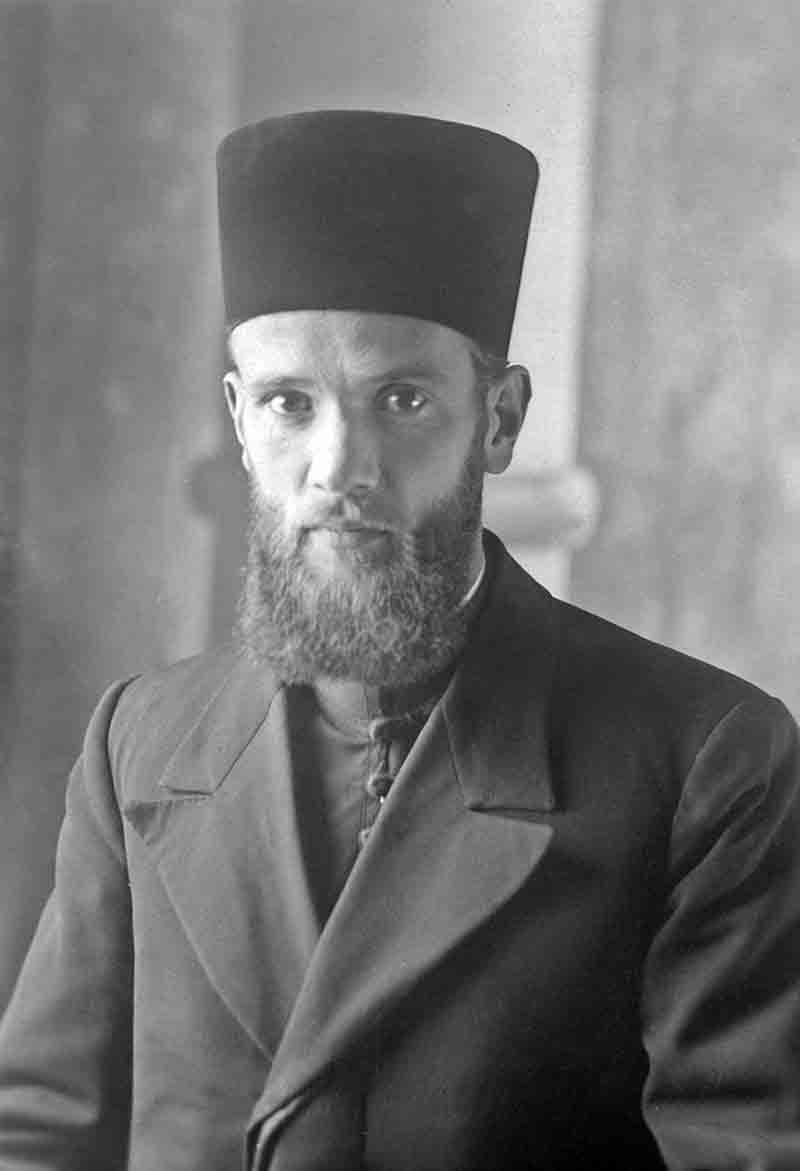
New Hieromartyr Damian (Damjan) Strbac, Jr.

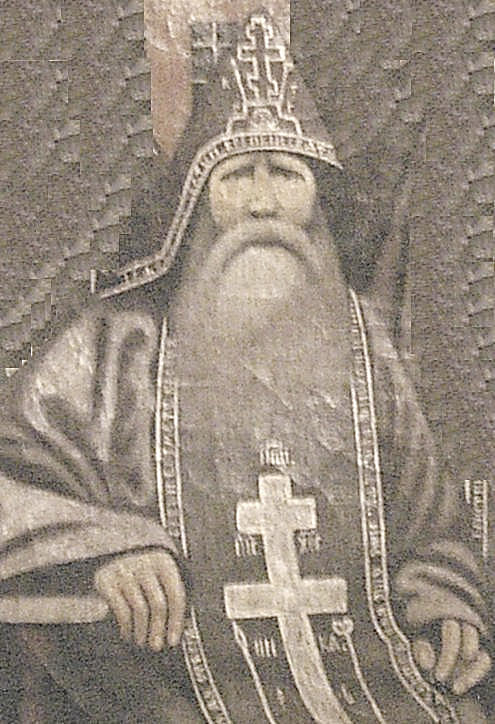
Blessed Philip (Khorev), founder of the Gethsemane Caves Skete.

== Sources ==
- May 18/31. Orthodox Calendar (PRAVOSLAVIE.RU).
- May 31 / May 18. HOLY TRINITY RUSSIAN ORTHODOX CHURCH (A parish of the Patriarchate of Moscow).
- May 18. OCA - The Lives of the Saints.
- May 18. The Roman Martyrology.
- May 18. Latin Saints of the Orthodox Patriarchate of Rome.

Greek Sources

- Great Synaxaristes: (in Greek) 18 ΜΑΪΟΥ. ΜΕΓΑΣ ΣΥΝΑΞΑΡΙΣΤΗΣ.
- (in Greek) Συναξαριστής. 18 Μαΐου. ECCLESIA.GR. (H ΕΚΚΛΗΣΙΑ ΤΗΣ ΕΛΛΑΔΟΣ).

Russian Sources

- (in Russian) 31 мая (18 мая). Православная Энциклопедия под редакцией Патриарха Московского и всея Руси Кирилла (электронная версия). (Orthodox Encyclopedia - Pravenc.ru).
