= Štrbac (surname) =

Štrbac is a Serbian surname. Notable people with the surname include:

- Branko Štrbac (born 1957), Serbian handball player
- Damjan Štrbac (1912–1941), Serbian Orthodox parish priest
- Savo Štrbac (born 1949), Croatian Serb lawyer and author
