= The Burial of St. Petronilla =

Painting by Guercino

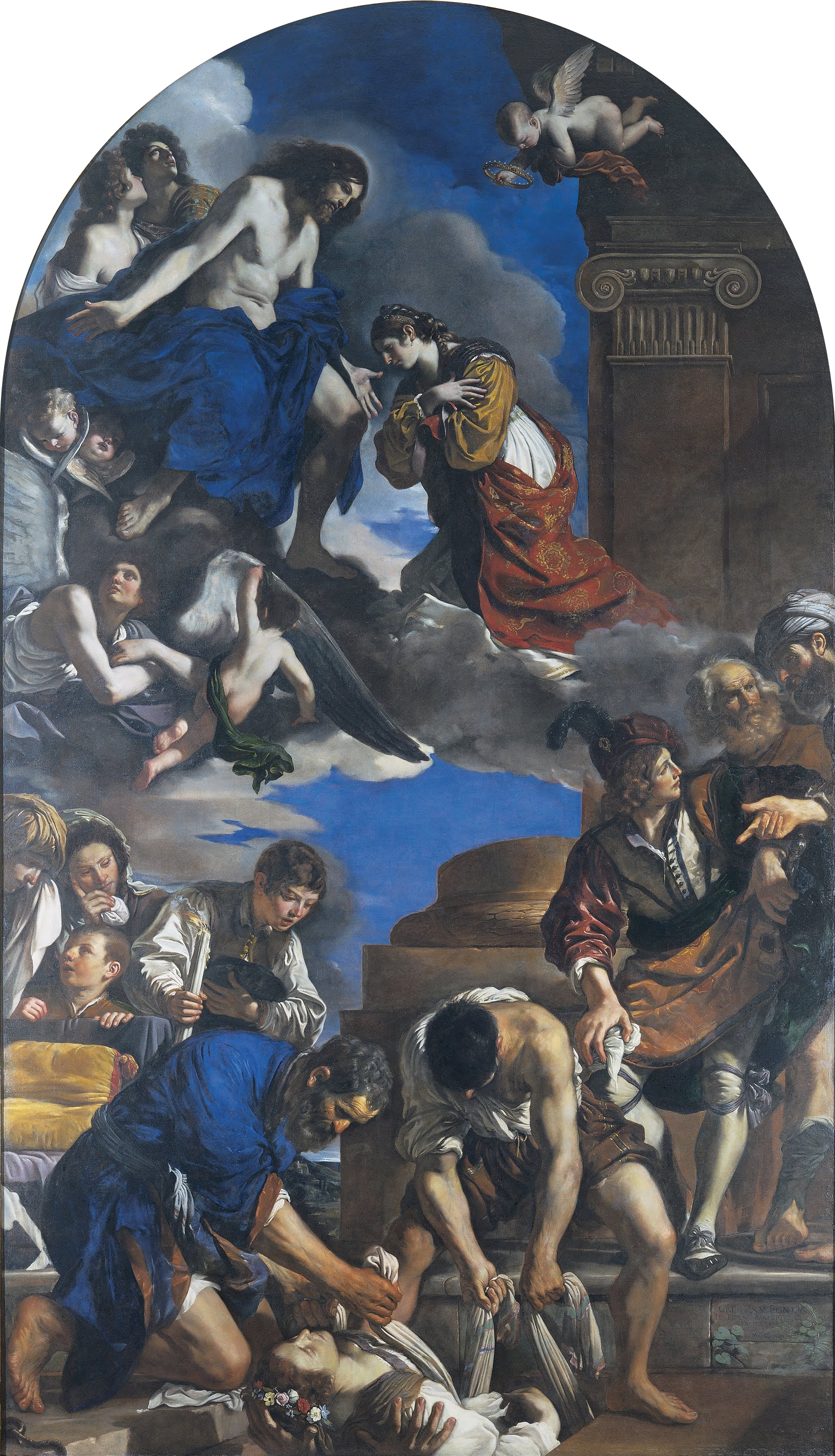
- Artist: Giovanni Francesco Barbieri (Guercino)
- Year: 1623
- Medium: Oil on canvas
- Dimensions: 720 cm × 423 cm (280 in × 167 in)
- Location: Capitoline Museums; Rome

The Burial of St. Petronilla is an altarpiece painted by the Italian artist Giovanni Francesco Barbieri (Guercino) around 1623. It simultaneously depicts the burial and the welcoming to heaven of the martyred Saint Petronilla. The altarpiece was painted for St. Peter's Basilica in Rome, for a chapel dedicated to the saint and containing her relics. It was later transferred to the Quirinal Palace, before being taken to Paris by Napoleon's troops. Brought back to Italy by Antonio Canova, it was placed in the Capitoline Museums of Rome in 1818, where it is currently displayed.

Petronilla, whose name means "little rock", is popularly believed to have been the daughter of Saint Peter, whose Greek name, Petros, means "rock". Her relics had rested in the catacombs of Domitilla in Rome until 757 when Pope Paul I translated her body to St Peter's in the circular mausoleum called thereafter of St Petronilla. The saint was named by the same Pope protector and patron of the French Kings to reward Pepin the Short of his service to the Papacy in front of the Lombard invasion. When the Rotunda of St Petronilla was demolished during the construction of the new St Peter, her body was translated to a new altar within the new church (1606). Guercino was instructed then to paint an altarpiece for the altar above her tomb.

== Description ==
The painting is a portrayal of Saint Petronilla's martyrdom. The representation created by Guercino emphasizes Petronilla's devotion to God above all, but also to the Church and the reward with which she met upon her death.

The painted narrative occurs on two tiers, Heaven and Earth. Petronilla is seen being lowered into her grave and at the same time entering Heaven. Both images are aligned along the central vertical axis, mirroring each other. The figures are directly involved in the actions depicted. However, the narrative representation does not exclude the congregation from its action. It tends more to emphasize its importance over the acts within the lives of the congregation.

The painting is open on all sides. In the lower portion hands reaching up from below the image field can be seen. The congregation is being included in the act of burying the St. The sense of belonging to and being affected by the act in progress is strengthened by its open form. The hands extending toward the Saint break the line between the action in the painting and the world in which the congregation inhabited. It is as though the scene were speaking directly to the congregation, beckoning them to participate in reverence.

=== Lower tier ===
The lower, earthly representation of the painting leans toward the Baroque. There exists a relative clarity, the light shifts from place to place, dark shadows dissolve forms. The right corner hand of the painting dissolves into complete darkness, while light is thrown onto Petronilla and the men lowering her into her grave. The clothing of a blue robed man appears to flow in and out of darks and lights. Overall, the effect creates a sense of immediacy, the here and the now. There is a feeling of chaos and haphazard organization. Figures are cut out of the picture maintaining a feeling of quick movement, a sense of time, emphasizing the effect of disorganization.

The style is painterly, lending to heavy, liquid shadows and tones. There is little unity as we could take any image from the lower tier and have an independent picture. The view of the painting takes on a haptic perspective, a close up scene without an integrated background. However, there is a slight sense of rhythm in the spiraling effect of figures from the lower tier to the top tier.

Though, overall the lower tier of the painting is definite in its depiction of action, defined time and haphazard order. There is a worldly, terrestrial, feeling to the depiction in the lower scene. The warm colors, yellows, and rust even add a sense of earth and dust. The location of the burial scene on the bottom tier, the hands of an unseen man reaching toward the dead saint, the steady action of figures, the focus of attention on the burial of Petronilla, the proximity of the lowering of Petronilla's dead body to the altar where the congregation makes its own sacrifice envelope the congregation into its realm. It becomes part of them and they become part of it. The size of the figures emphasizes the scene's statement, the congregation is made more aware of their part in the painting by its dominating presence.

=== Upper tier ===
The second tier, while maintaining certain elements of the Baroque has started to lean to a classical representation. There is a sense of time, as Petronilla bows before Christ Jesus, however, the animation is more suspended, calm, less fleeting. Petronilla's head is bowed before Christ as he welcomes her, though the angels in heaven are relaxed and calm upon her arrival as they continue to make their own way beside and around her.

Though certain aspects still can be withdrawn independently, there is still a feeling of overall unity. Petronilla's gown is red; however, overall the colors in heaven are cooler and crisp. The lines are clearer and depths more definable, which lends a feeling of freshness, cleanliness and purity. The upper tier is farthest away from the congregation, reaching toward heaven. There is no direct link between this heaven for the congregation except through Petronilla who has passed from the earth and is greeted by Christ.

== Religious interpretation ==
Guercino's depiction of Saint Petronilla's burial, is perhaps a guide for the congregation. In depicting the death of a highly venerated Saint, one whose relics have recently been transferred to the altar in the church named for her father, the reverence for the Saint, for the values she placed on her life, is propelled. Shared by the congregation are her death and sacrifice. They are even, in a way, part of it. They are able to see her acceptance into heaven. In the immediate state they are only able to witness this acceptance through Petronilla. Though through their own sacrifice, reverence and devotion, as they are reminded in the painting, they may be able to partake in the same acceptance upon their departure from earth.
