= Peter, Andrew, Paul, and Denise =

Catholic and Eastern Orthodox saints

Saints Peter, Andrew, Paul, and Denise

Martyrs
- Died: ~250 AD; Lampsacus (modern-day Lapseki, Çanakkale, Turkey)
- Venerated in: Roman Catholic Church; Eastern Orthodox Church
- Major shrine: Abbey of Flône (St. Denise)
- Feast: Roman Catholic: 15 May; Eastern Orthodox: 18 May
- Patronage: Denise is invoked against bicycle and motorcycle accidents and headaches

Saints Peter, Andrew, Paul and Denise (Latin: Petrus, Andreas, Paulus, Dionisia/Dionysia) are venerated as martyrs by the Eastern Orthodox and Catholic Churches. They were killed in the 3rd century at Lampsacus, Mysia (in present-day Turkey) on the Hellespont.

== Martyrdom ==
According to tradition, Denise was martyred during the persecution of Christians by the Emperor Decius, along with three men named Andrew, Paul, and Nichomachus. Nichomachus, "presumptuous and over-confident", denied that he was a Christian after he was tortured and was asked to perform a sacrifice to the Roman gods. However, as he was about to perform this task, he suffered a convulsion and fell dead. Andrew and Paul refused to apostatize and were tortured on the rack and then imprisoned.

Denise was a sixteen-year-old Christian girl who vocalized her unhappiness regarding Nichomachus' apostasy. She was brought before the proconsul Optimus, and refused to abjure her faith. Optimus condemned her to be raped by several soldiers; however, according to tradition, she was "subjected to the approaches of three libertines, but was protected by an angel." Paul and Andrew were finally led to their execution, and were stoned to death in the local arena.

Denise managed to escape from prison and locate the bodies of the two men. She publicly expressed her desire to share their martyrdom, was carried away by force, and was promptly ordered to be beheaded by Optimus.

== Feast day ==
The feast day of these saints is observed in the Roman Catholic Church on May 15, and in the Eastern Orthodox Church on May 18 (for those churches which follow the traditional Julian Calendar, May 18 falls on May 31 of the modern Gregorian Calendar).

== Relics ==
Relics attributed to Denise were brought to the Abbey of Flône in Belgium in 1922, and placed within a statue of wax; the relics included a vase associated that contains her crystallized blood. A second vase contains earth said to have been drenched with the blood of Christian martyrs. On the sarcophagus is embedded a marble tablet said to come from Roman catacombs; it carries the inscription: DIONISE, V.M..I.IN.P VIX. AN. XXIX. ("Denise, celebrated virgin martyr rests in peace. She lived 29 years").

The relics are visible through small openings; in the modern era this saint is invoked for protection against bicycle and motorcycle accidents and headaches.

== See also ==
- Denis
