= May 31 (Eastern Orthodox liturgics) =

Day in the Eastern Orthodox liturgical calendar

Eastern Orthodox liturgical calendar
May 30	May 31	June 1
May 31 O.S. ≍ June 13 N.S. May 31 N.S ≍ May 18 O.S.

An Eastern Orthodox cross

May 31 in Eastern Orthodox liturgical calendars is a feast day and a day of commemoration of saints and martyrs. Although some Orthodox churches use the Revised Julian Calendar and others use the traditional Julian calendar, the fixed commemorations for their respective May 31 are broadly the same, no matter which calendar is used. (Note: Despite the dates being the same, the days to which they refer typically differ by 13 days. The notation Old Style or O.S. is sometimes used to indicate a date in the traditional Julian Calendar (the "Old Calendar"). The notation New Style or N.S. indicates a date in the Revised Julian calendar (the "New Calendar").)

== Saints ==
- Apostle Hermes of Philippopolis (Hermas), of the Seventy Apostles (1st century)
- Martyr Hermias of Comana (160) (Note: "At Comana in Pontus during the reign of Emperor Antoninus, St. Hermias, a soldier. Being miraculously delivered from many horrible torments, he converted his executioner to Christ, and made him partaker of the crown which he was first to receive by being beheaded.")

- Martyr Magus (the Magician), who converted upon witnessing the martyrdom of Hermias (160) (Note: We do not know what his name was.)

- Martyr Philosophus at Alexandria (252)
- Martyrs Eusebios and Charalampos, in Nicomedia, by fire. (see also May 30)
- Five Martyrs of Ashkelon, by being dragged to death.
- Saint Apollonios (Apollo) of the Egyptian Thebaid (395)
- Saint Eustathius, Patriarch of Constantinople (1025) (Note: His name is absent in the Synaxaristes and the Menaia, but it is recorded in the Byzantine Calendar.)

== Pre-Schism Western saints ==
- Virgin-martyr Petronilla, at Rome (1st or 3rd century) (Note: "At Rome, St. Petronilla, virgin, disciple of the blessed apostle Peter. She refused to marry Flaccus, a nobleman, and was granted three days for deliberation. She spent these days in fasting and in prayer, and on the third day, after having received the Sacrament of the Body of Christ, she yielded up her soul.)
- Martyr Crescentian, in Sassari in Sardinia (c. 130)
- Martyrs Cantius, Cantian, Cantianilla and Protus, in Aquileia (304) (Note: "At Aquileia, the holy martyrs Cantius, Cantian, and Cantianilla, members of one family, which belonged to the illustrious line of the Anicii. For their attachment to the Christian faith, they were condemned to capital punishment with their tutor, Protus, in the time of Emperors Diocletian and Maximian.")
- Saint Sylvius of Toulouse, Bishop of Lyon (c. 400)
- Saint Lupicinus of Verona, Bishop of Verona, described as 'the most holy, the best of bishops' (5th century)
- Saint Paschasius, Deacon and Confessor in Rome, who is mentioned by Pope Gregory I (512)
- Saint Winnow, Mancus and Myrbad, Irish saints who lived in Cornwall where churches are dedicated to them (6th century) (Note: "Troparion of Ss Winnow, Mancus and Myrbad, Tone 6: O three holy Saints who in honour of the Trinity left Ireland to labour in Cornwall: having toiled on earth you are glorified in heaven, blessed Winnow, Mancus and Myrbad.")

== Post-Schism Orthodox saints ==
- Saint Philotheus (Leschynsky) of Tobolsk, Metropolitan of Tobolsk and the "Apostle of Siberia" (1727) (Note: On June 18th, 1700, Tsar Peter the Great published an Ukase (imperial edict) that made a resounding appeal for the propagation of the Orthodox faith in Siberia and China. In response to the Ukase of 1700, Philothei (Leschinsky) of Kiev was chosen as the Metropolitan of Tobolsk and All Siberia (1702-1711), long since a center of missionary operations, in order to "lead the natives in China and Siberia to the service of the true and living God." He built 37 churches and personally accounted for the baptism of 40,000 Siberian tribesmen by 1721.) (Note: See: (in Russian) Филофей (Лещинский). Википедии. (Russian Wikipedia).)

=== New martyrs and confessors ===
- New Hieromartyr Archpriest Philosophus (Ornatsky), with his sons Martyrs Boris and Nicholas, in St. Petersburg (1918) (Note: See: (in Russian) Орнатский, Философ Николаевич. Википедии. (Russian Wikipedia).)
- New Hieromartyrs Hierotheus (Afonin), Bishop of Nikolsk (1928), (Note: See: (in Russian) Иерофей (Афонин). Википедии. (Russian Wikipedia).) and Hieroschemamonk Seraphim (Nikolsky) (1923)

== Other commemorations ==
- First translation of the relics (1591) of Hieromartyr Philip II, Metropolitan of Moscow and all Russia (1569), to Solovki.
- Repose of Archimandrite Macarius (Briushkov) of Peshnosha Monastery, (Note: See: (in Russian) Николо-Пешношский монастырь. Википедии. (Russian Wikipedia).) disciple of Blessed Theodore of Sanaxar (1811)
- Finding of the relics (1960) of New Martyr Nicholas the Deacon, of Mytilene (1463)

== Icon gallery ==
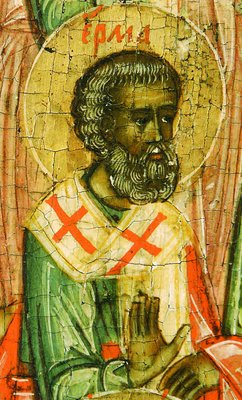
St. Hermes of Philippopolis, of the Seventy Apostles.

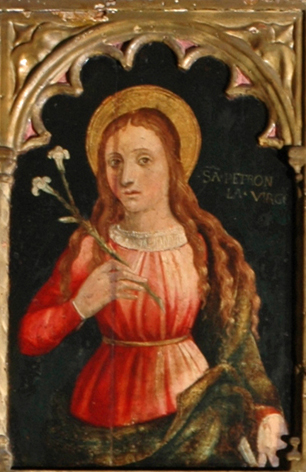
St. Petronilla (Aurelia Petronilla), virgin martyr.

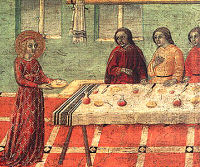
St. Petronilla (Aurelia Petronilla), by Sano di Pietro.

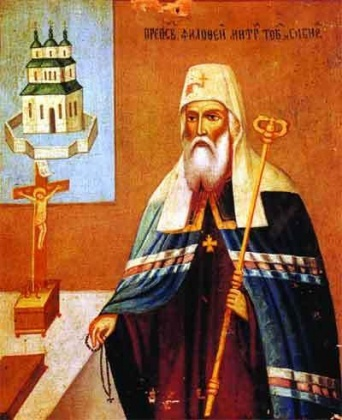
Saint Philotheus (Leshchinsky) of Tobolsk, Metropolitan of Tobolsk and the "Apostle of Siberia" .

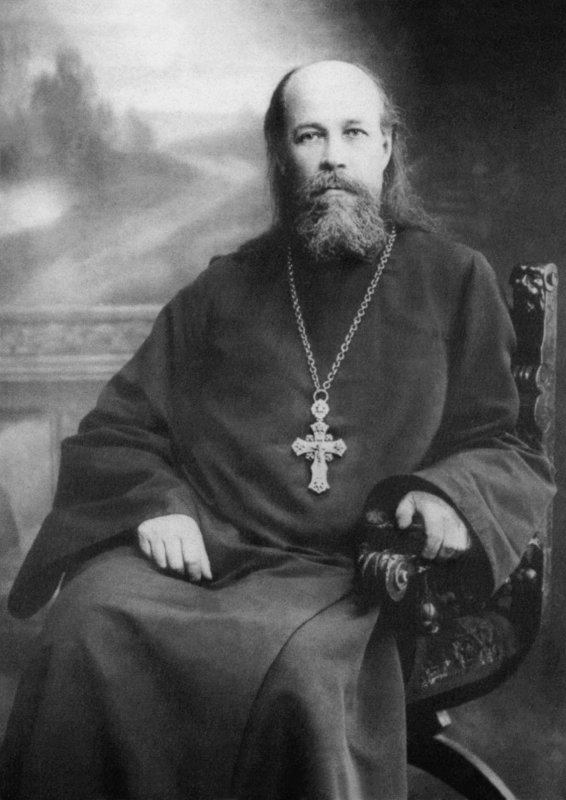
Hieromartyr Archpriest Philosophus (Ornatsky) (†1918).

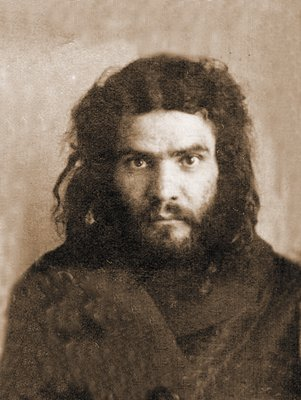
New Hieromartyr Hierotheus (Afonin), Bishop of Nikolsk.

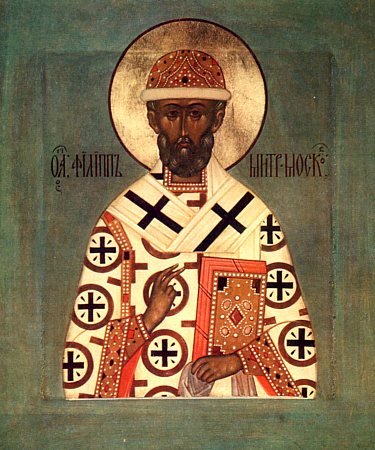
St. Philip, Metropolitan of Moscow.

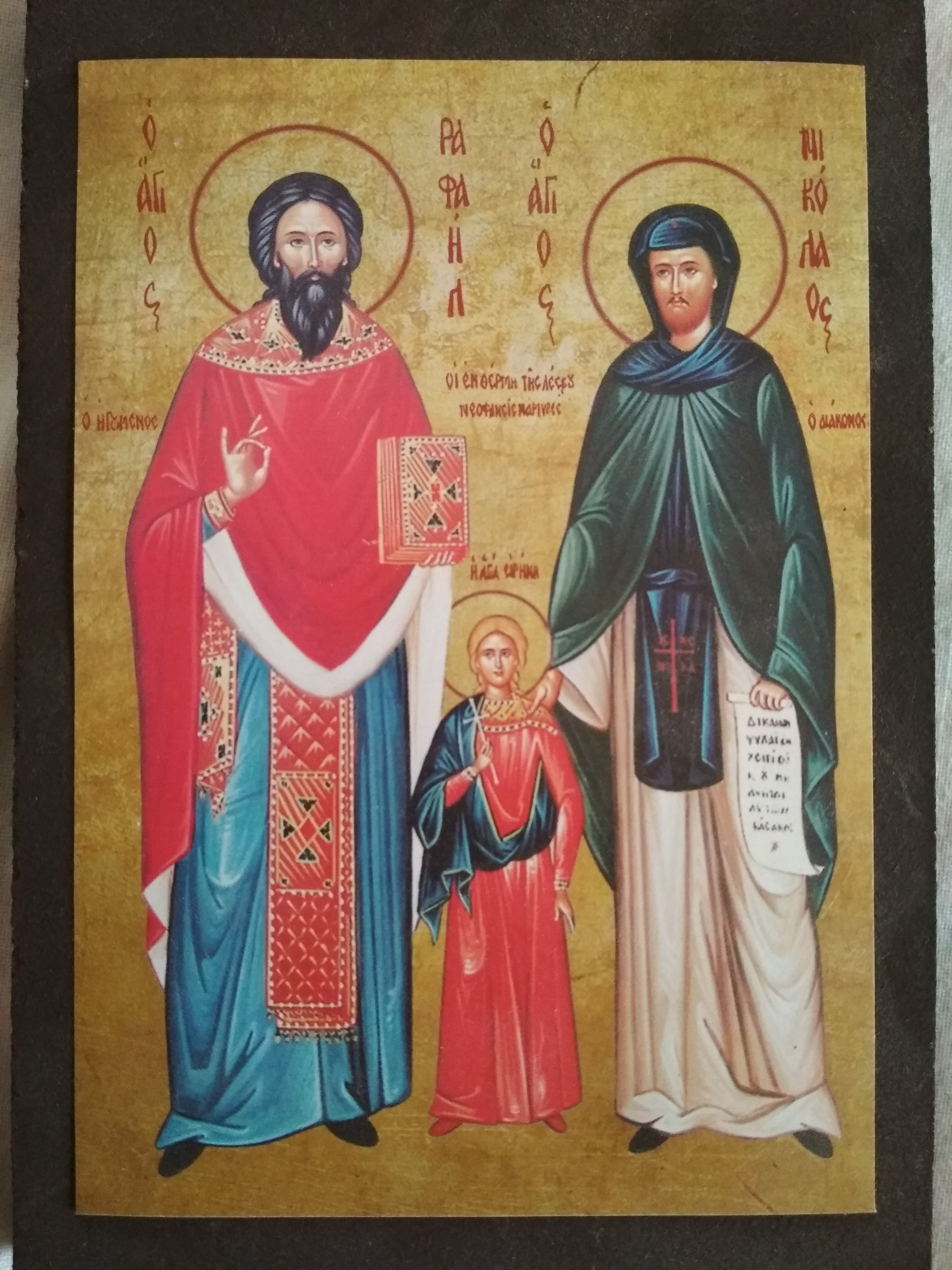
New Martyr Nicholas the Deacon (right).

== Sources ==
- May 31/June 13. Orthodox Calendar (ORTHOCHRISTIAN.COM).
- June 13 / May 31. HOLY TRINITY RUSSIAN ORTHODOX CHURCH (A parish of the Patriarchate of Moscow).
- May 31. OCA - The Lives of the Saints.
- May 31. Latin Saints of the Orthodox Patriarchate of Rome.
- May 31. The Roman Martyrology.

Greek Sources

- Great Synaxaristes: (in Greek) 31 ΜΑΪΟΥ. ΜΕΓΑΣ ΣΥΝΑΞΑΡΙΣΤΗΣ.
- (in Greek) Συναξαριστής. 31 Μαΐου. ECCLESIA.GR. (H ΕΚΚΛΗΣΙΑ ΤΗΣ ΕΛΛΑΔΟΣ).

Russian Sources

- (in Russian) 13 июня (31 мая). Православная Энциклопедия под редакцией Патриарха Московского и всея Руси Кирилла (электронная версия). (Orthodox Encyclopedia - Pravenc.ru).
