= Flône Abbey =

Coordinates: 50°33′29″N 5°20′10″E

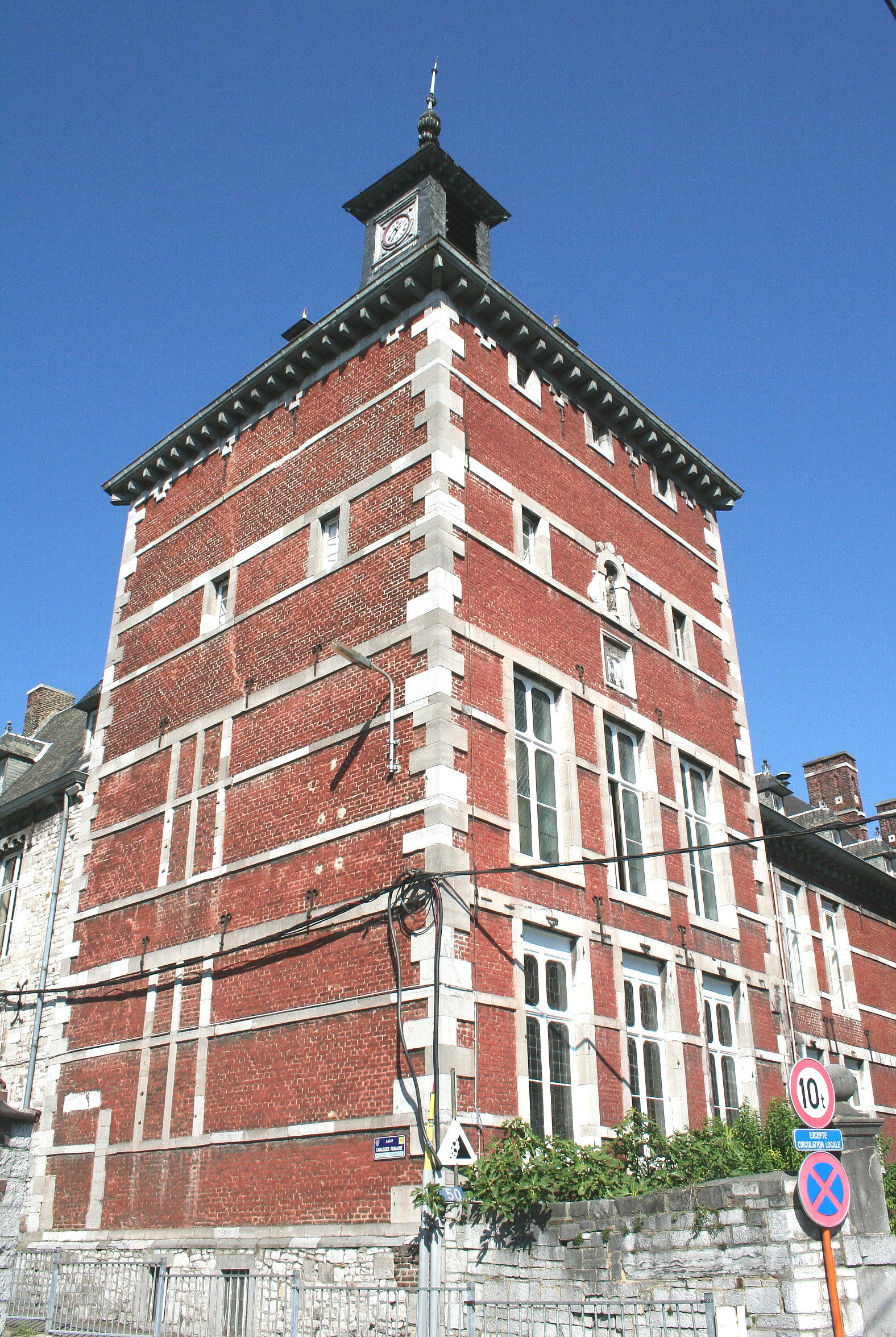
The junction tower. Flône Abbey.

Flône Abbey (French: Abbaye de Flône) is located on the left bank of the river Meuse at Flône (Amay), in the province of Liège, Wallonia, Belgium. It was founded in 1075.

== History ==
In 1075, three lay brothers decided to devote themselves to the religious life and established themselves on land donated by Henry I of Verdun, Bishop of Liège, near the village of Flône. The site would serve as a convenient resting-place for travelers on the Tongres-Amay-Arlon road, and the lay brothers built a water mill and an oratory dedicated to Saint Matthew.

In 1189, the site became an abbey and became associated with the order of the Augustinian regular canons. A brewery was established in 1550 during the administration of Abbot Philippe d'Orjo (d. 1555), whose tomb is conserved in the church. In 1568, the abbey was plundered and destroyed by the Calvinist troops of William the Silent.

Thomas de Vinalmont (1608–1623) built the dovecote, porch, and mill, and under the Abbot Guillaume de Hemricourt (1636–1670) and his nephew Abbot Dieudonné de Hemricourt (1670–1692), the church, convent, and tour d'angle (junction tower) were built, the last of which became the emblematic image of the old abbey. These buildings formed a double court, at the center of which can be found the church of Saint-Matthieu. The Church of Saint-Matthieu, formerly the abbey church and now the parish church of Flône, contains five tombstones, of black marble, dedicated to various prelates of Flône; 17th century baptismal fonts; 17th century choral stalls; and two tableaux by Jean Del Cour (1631–1707) on the walls of the apse. These tableaux depict Saint Matthew and St. Augustine of Hippo. The church also contains a pipe organ built in 1710 by Karel Dillens. The church also contains a reliquary associated with the remains associated with St. Denise, an early Christian martyr. The relics are visible through small openings; in the modern era this saint is invoked for protection against bicycle and motorcycle accidents and headaches.

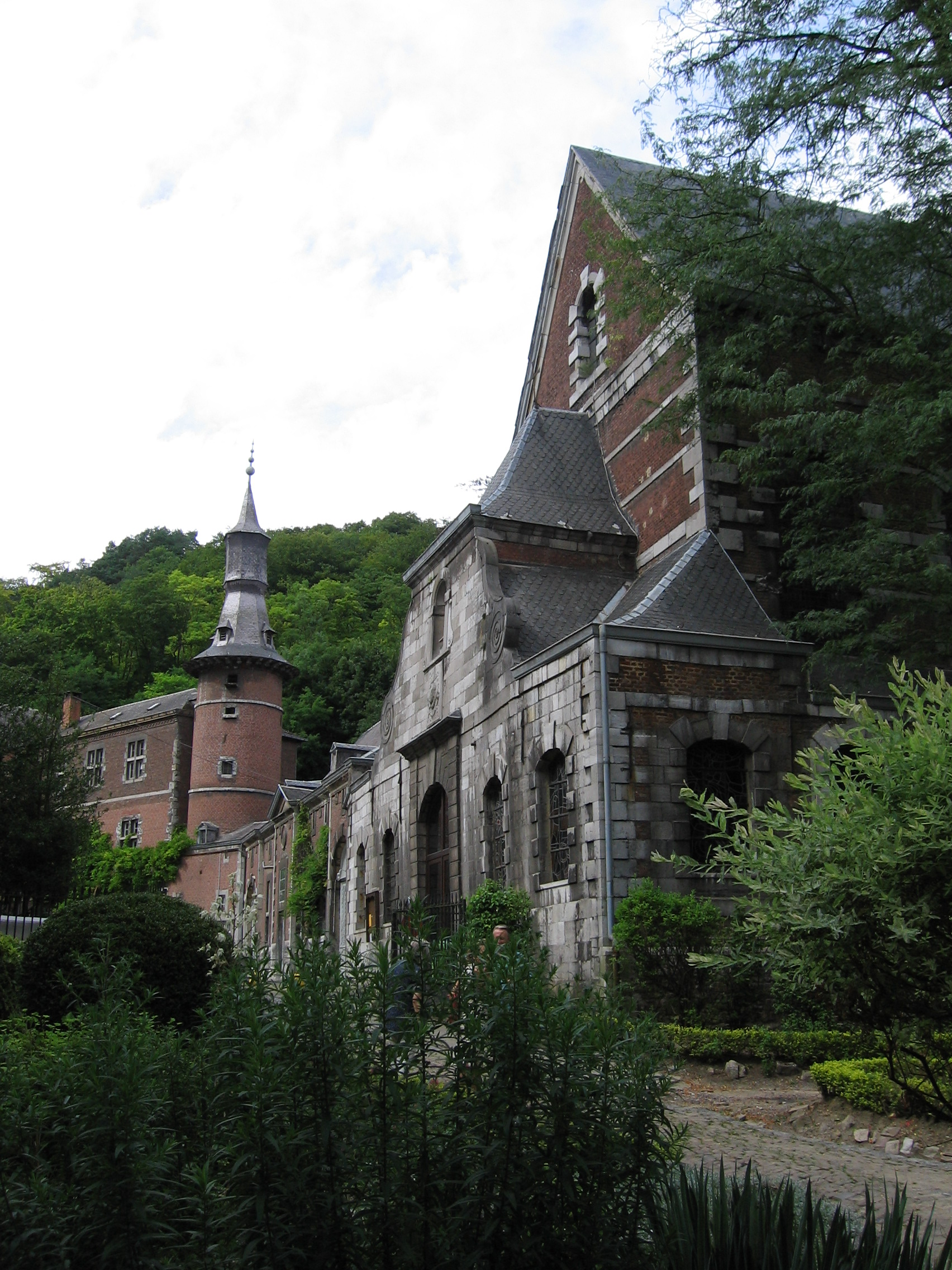
Dovecote and church of Saint-Matthieu

Denise's relics were brought to the Abbey of Flône in 1922, and a vase associated with the saint contains her crystallized blood. A second vase contains earth said to have been drenched with the blood of Christian martyrs. On the sarcophagus is embedded a marble tablet said to come from Roman catacombs; it carries the inscription: DIONISE, V.M..I.IN.P VIX. AN. XXIX. (Denise, celebrated virgin martyr rests in peace. She lived 29 years).

In the 18th century, Jean-Jerome de Schroots (1725–1742) added a tithe house (maison de la dîme) and his successor Charles Delvaux de Fenffe rebuilt the abbatial palace.

Flône acquired a vast domain and the rights associated with its lands, which included various farms and privileges regarding forests and fisheries.

In 1796, control of the abbey was assumed by the French revolutionary authorities; its lands and goods were confiscated and sold to private individuals.

In 1921, the order known as the Ladies of Christian Education (Dames de l'instruction chrétienne) acquired Flône Abbey and made it their principal house. A boarding school for young girls was opened at the abbey. The institution later introduced co-education. A footbridge was built, which connected it with Château Goffart (built in 1905). There was a fire at the abbey in December 2007, which damaged some of the old woodwork. In 2019, the elementary school at the abbey had more than 500 pupils; there were more than 1000 pupils at the secondary level.
