= St. Petronilla, Handorf =

Church building in Münster, Germany

Coordinates: 51.988033°N 7.697623°E

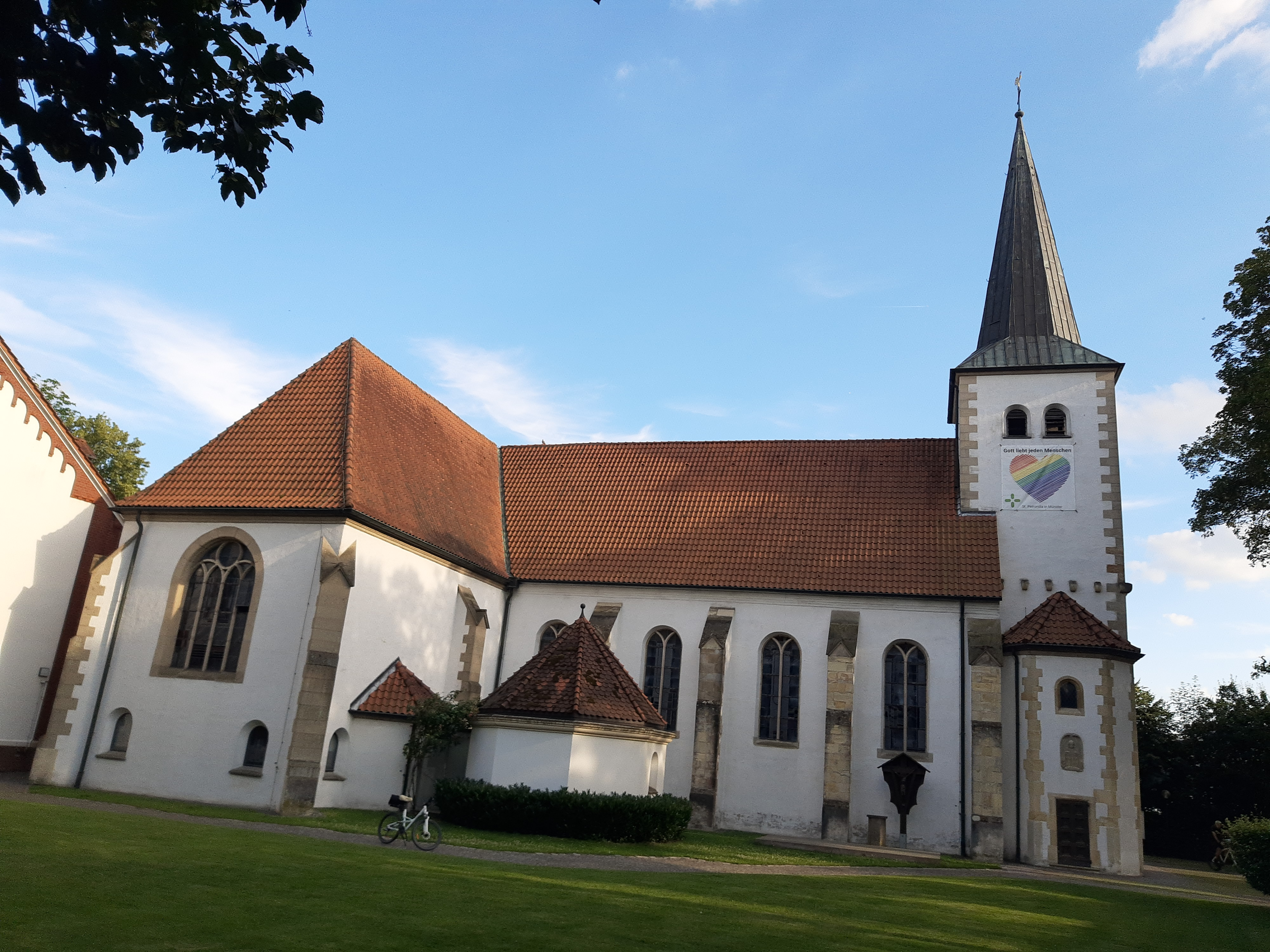

St. Petronilla is a Catholic church in Handorf, now part of Münster, North Rhine-Westphalia, Germany. The present building dates back to around 1700, expanded in the 19th and 20th centuries.

== History ==
The first church in Handorf, a small wooden structure, was built around 1030 and dedicated to Saint Petronilla. It was replaced by a stone church around 1300, after Handorf had become a parish in 1282. The present church was built around 1700, with a tower added in 1864/65 in Gothic revival style. In 1913 the church was expanded by a transept, with a new choir and sacristy.

In 1942 the tower was ablated to an order by the Luftgaukommandant, because it was in the way of air traffic to the military airport nearby. It was restore in 1976/77, as part of major restoration and expansion.

The baptismal font is a Romanesque work made probably in the 13th century from Baumberger Sandstein.. A large oil painting of a crucifixion group in the choir belongs to the church since 1886. It was possibly painted around by an unknown artist before 1850. The organ, in the transept, was built in 1980 by Romanus Seifert from Kevelaer, with 16 stops on two manuals and pedal.

== Parish ==
The church belongs to the Diocese of Münster. The parish St. Petronilla was expanded in 2010 by two parishes that formerly belonged to Münster, but later this parish became part of the large new parish of the Münster Cathedral.
