= Merolilan of Rheims =

Merolilan of Rheims was an Irish Christian martyr and saint who lived in the 8th century.

== Background ==
Merolilian was an Irish preacher who is commemorated on 18 and/or 31 May. He was killed at Rheims, France. No tradition of him or his exact origins survived in Ireland, only a cult based at Rheims.

== Martyrdom ==
According to John O'Hanlon, "An account of St. Merolilanus is to be found, in the ancient Breviary of the Diocese of Rheims, in France; and, the accomplished Flodoard, in his history of that ancient church, sets forth several particulars, regarding the holy man. St. Merolilanus was of Irish race — indicated by the term Scotigena applied to him — and he travelled into France, with some companions, for the purpose of making a pilgrimage to Rome. Passing along the River Axona — now known as L'Aisne — some robbers set upon the travellers, and those freebooters killed Merolilanus. His companions brought the body of the holy man to Rheims, where it was interred in an ancient cemetery. For a long time, the very memory of St. Merolilanus seems to have been forgotten, in the place of his sepulture, until miracles revealed the spot where he was buried. It happened in the time of Hildegarius, a Priest of Rheims, as we are told in the History of that city, by Flodoard."

== Translation of relics ==
Upon the restoration of Archbishop Artaud to Rheims in 935, the remains of Merolilanus were translated to the Church of the Holy Apostles and of St. Symphronien, Martyr, at Rheims. It seems probable, that either Archbishop Artaldus, or his successor Odalricus, took care to have this ceremony carried out, with due solemnity, and according to the requirement of St. Merolilanus.
