= Damjan Štrbac =

Serbian Orthodox parish priest

Saint Damian of Grahovo
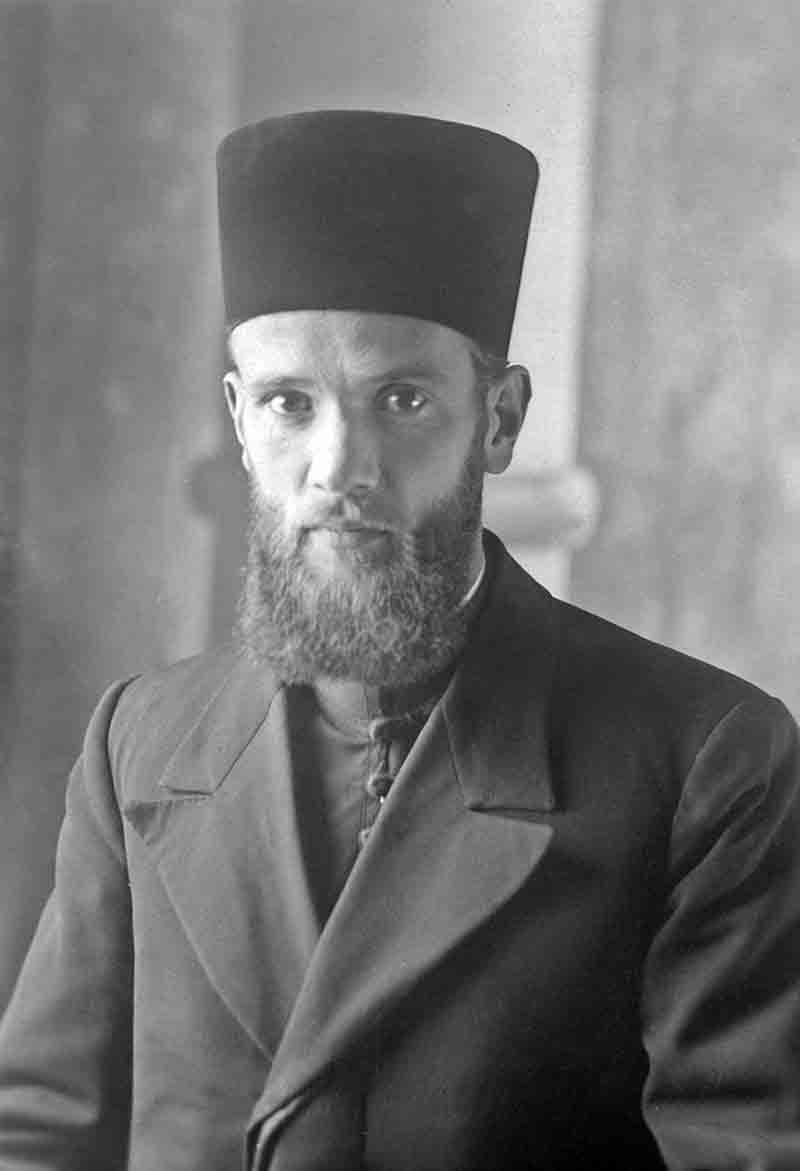

Hieromartyr and New Martyr
- Born: Damjan Štrbac; 19 February 1912; Plavno, near Knin
- Died: 17 June 1941 (aged 29); Jadovno, Independent State of Croatia
- Cause of death: Flaying
- Venerated in: Eastern Orthodox Church
- Canonized: 20 May 2003 by the Holy Council of Bishops of the Serbian Orthodox Church
- Feast: 13 June [O.S. 31 May] First Saturday after Elijah's day
- Attributes: Red phelonion, gospel book, making the hand of benediction

Damjan Štrbac (Serbian Cyrillic: Дамјан Штрбац, 19 February 1912 – 17 July 1941) was a Serbian Orthodox parish priest who was martyred by the Ustaše. He was canonized by the Serbian Orthodox Church as Saint Damian of Grahovo (Serbian: Свети Дамјан Граховски).

== Biography ==
Štrbac was born in Plavno near Knin. He attended Cetinje Seminary and finished it in 1932. He was ordained a deacon on 17 March and a priest on 18 March 1934 in Šibenik.

He served as parish priest in Žegar and then in Bosansko Grahovo when the Second World War started.

At the end of May 1941, the Italian army withdrew from Grahovo and its surroundings, and was replaced by an Ustaše unit, who immediately proceeded on 14 June 1941 to arrest citizens from the place and the surrounding area. Among them, Štrbac was arrested. He spent almost twenty days in the prison of the District Court in Bosansko Grahovo, and after that he was taken to Knin, and then to Gospić, where he was held as a detainee with the identification number of 577. He was taken from the camp to the Jadovno concentration camp and where he was skinned alive by the Ustaše guards and then thrown into a pit.

At the regular session of the Holy Council of Bishops of the Serbian Orthodox Church, on 20 May 2003, at the suggestion of Bishop Chrysostom of Bihać-Petrovac, he was included in the Council of Holy Hieromartyrs of the Church of God.

His feast day is celebrated on 13 June [O.S. 31 May]. He is also commemorated on the first Saturday after Elijah's day (2 August [O.S. 20 July]).
