= Chernigovsky Skete =

Monastery in central Russia

Coordinates: 56°18′26″N 38°10′47″E

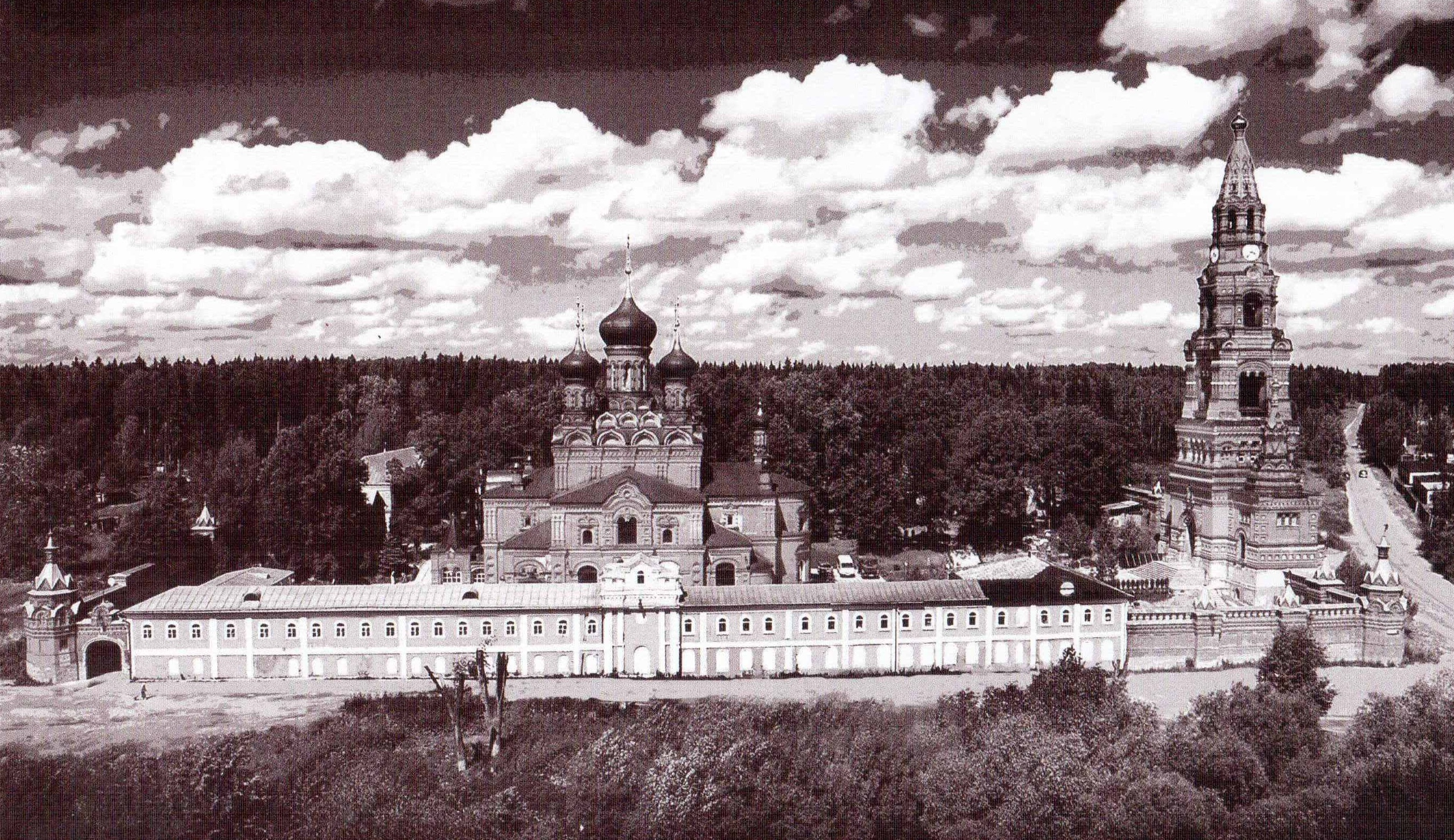
The Chernigovsky skete

The Chernigovsky Skete in Sergiev Posad, Russia is a monastery in central Russia.
