= Saint Hermias =

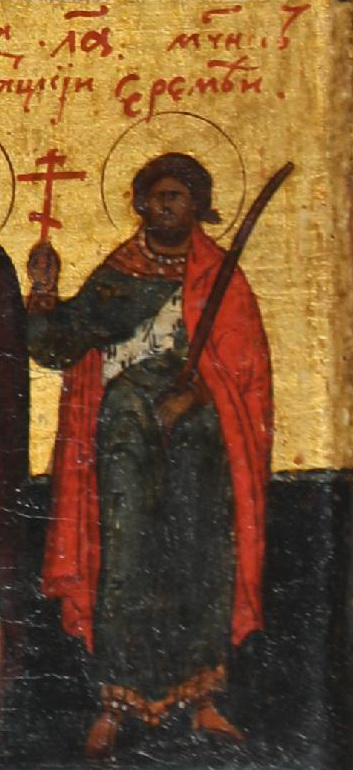

Martyr
- Died: 160; Comana, Cappadocia
- Venerated in: Roman Catholic Church, Eastern Orthodox Church
- Canonized: Pre-congregation
- Feast: 31 May

Hermias of Comana (/hɜːrˈmaɪəs/; Ancient Greek: Ἑρμείας) is an early martyr commemorated in the Orthodox Church and the Catholic Church. He lived in the 2nd century and was a soldier in the Roman army until he confessed Christ and was tortured. His feast day is 31 May.

== Life ==
The Saint and Martyr Hermias was a soldier who had spent long years in the Roman army, in Comana in Pontus. Completing his service under the reign of Antoninus Pius (138–161), he refused any pay and confessed his faith to Christ. He was arrested and brought before Sebastian, Proconsul in Comana, who summoned him to renounce his confession to show his loyalty towards the Roman emperor. As Hermias refused vigorously, he was sent to be tortured. His tormentors broke his jaws, and then tore off the skin of his face. He was then thrown in a burning furnace, from which he left unscathed after three days. Sebastian then decided to resort to a sorcerer Marus, who concocted a strong poison with the intention of killing the Saint. Hermias blessed the poison with the sign of the cross and drank it with no harm. Having seen Saint Hermias drink with no effect a second stronger poison that he had prepared for him, Marus himself confessed the divine power of Christ and was immediately beheaded. Saint Marus was baptized in his own blood, and was made a martyr. Hermias was then subjected to new torments: he was plunged in boiling oil, his eyes were gouged out, and he was then suspended upside down for three days, but he kept giving thanks to Christ. Finally, the crazed Sebastian beheaded him with his own sword. Christians secretly buried the body of the martyr Hermias, whose relics bestowed numerous healings.
