= Saint Petronilla =

Roman Catholic saint

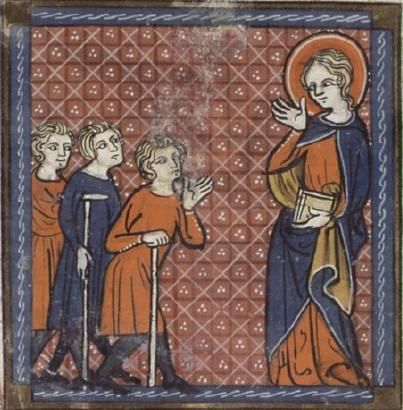
- Saint Petronilla and the sick, 14th-century French manuscript

Virgin
- Died: 1st century; possibly 3rd century
- Venerated in: Catholic Church
- Feast: 31 May
- Attributes: Depicted being healed by Peter the Apostle; early Christian maiden with a broom; lying dead but incorrupt in her coffin with flowers in her hair as the coffin is opened during renovations; receiving the newly dead into heaven; set of keys; spurning a marriage proposal, represented by a ring, being offered by a king; standing with Saint Peter; woman holding a set of keys; woman with a dolphin
- Patronage: The dauphins of France; mountain travellers; treaties between Popes and Frankish emperors; invoked against fever

Saint Petronilla (sometimes called Aurelia Petronilla) (Note: Name variants include Pernelle; Peroline; Perrenotte; Perrette; Perrine; Perronelle; Petronella; Peyronne; Peyronnelle; Pierrette; Pérette; Périne; Pétronille.) is an early Christian saint. She is venerated as a Virgin in the Catholic Church. Petronilla died in Rome at the end of the 1st century, or possibly in the 3rd century.

== Identity ==
Petronilla was traditionally identified as the daughter of Peter, though this may have stemmed simply from the similarity of names. It is believed she may have been a convert of Peter (and thus a "spiritual daughter"), or a follower or servant. It is said that Peter cured her of palsy. The 1913 Catholic Encyclopedia speculates that she may have been related to Domitilla. Though Petronilla was originally venerated as the daughter of Peter, more recent study has shown that she belonged to the Roman family of the Aurelli. The mistake arose from misunderstanding an inscription.

Stories associated with her include those that relate that she was so beautiful that Peter had locked her up in a tower to keep her from eligible men; that a pagan king named Flaccus, wishing to marry her, led Petronilla to go on a hunger strike, from which she died.

In the 4th-century Roman catalogue of martyrs' feasts, which is used in the Martyrologium Hieronymianum, her name seems not to have been inserted. It occurs in the latter martyrology, but only as a later addition. Her name is given under 31 May and the Martyrologies of Bede and his imitators adopt the same date.

The absence of her name from the 4th-century Roman calendar of feasts suggests that Petronilla died at the end of the first or during the 2nd century, since no special feasts for martyrs were celebrated during this period. After the erection of the basilica over her remains and those of Nereus and Achilleus in the 4th century, her cult extended widely and her name was therefore admitted later into the martyrology. A legend, the existence of which in the 6th century is proved by its presence in the list of the tombs of the Roman martyrs prepared by Abbot John at the end of this century, regards Petronilla as a real daughter of the apostle Peter. In the apocryphal Acts of Peter, dating from the 2nd century, a daughter of Peter is mentioned, although her name is not given.

Petronilla was identified at Rome with this supposed daughter of Peter, probably because of her name and the great antiquity of her tomb. She appears in the legendary Acts of the martyrs Nereus and Achilleus and in the Liber Pontificalis, but as a virgin rather than as a martyr. From this legend of Nereus and Achilleus, a similar notice was admitted into the historical martyrologies of the Middle Ages and from there into the modern Roman Martyrology.

== Veneration ==
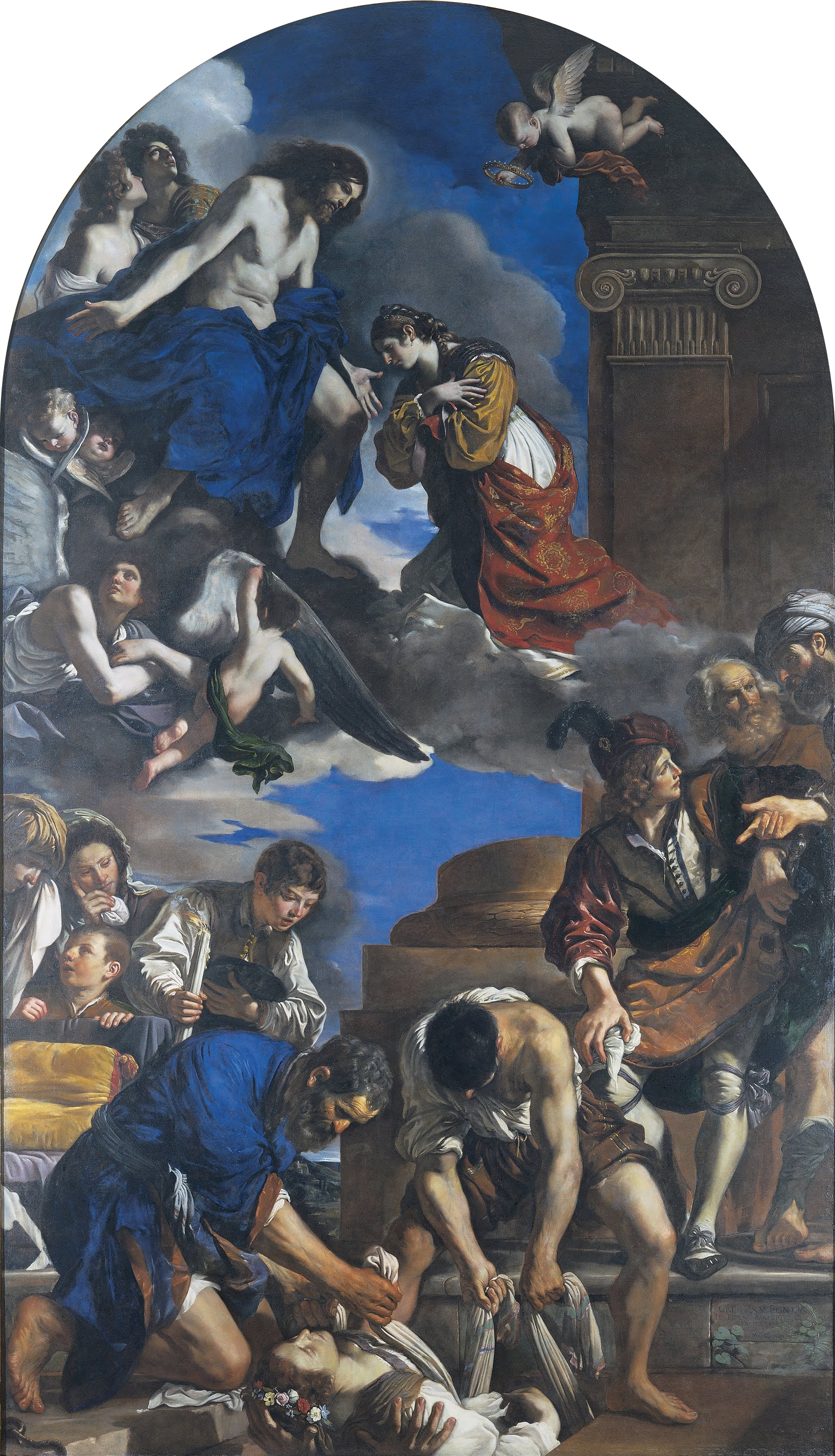
The Burial of Saint Petronilla, by Guercino, 1621–22

=== Burial ===
Almost all the 6th- and 7th-century lists of the tombs of the most highly venerated Roman martyrs mention Petronilla's grave as situated in the Via Ardeatina near Nereus and Achilleus. These notices have been completely confirmed by the excavations in the Catacomb of Domitilla. One topography of the graves of the Roman martyrs, Epitome libri de locis sanctorum martyrum, locates on the Via Ardeatina a church of St. Petronilla, in which Nereus and Achilleus, as well as Petronilla, were buried.

This church, built into the above-mentioned catacomb, has been discovered, and the memorials found in it removed all doubt that the tombs of the three saints were once venerated there.

A painting, in which Petronilla is represented as receiving a deceased person (named Veneranda) into heaven, was discovered on the closing stone of a tomb in an underground crypt behind the apse of the basilica. Beside the saint's picture is her name: Petronilla Mart. (yr). That the painting was done shortly after 356, is proved by an inscription found in the tomb.

It is thus clearly established that Petronilla was venerated at Rome as a martyr in the 4th century, and the testimony must be accepted as certainly historical, notwithstanding the later legend which recognizes her only as a virgin (see below). Another known, but unfortunately no longer extant, memorial was the marble sarcophagus which contained her remains, under Pope Paul I translated to St. Peter's Basilica. In the account of this in the Liber Pontificalis the inscription carved on the sarcophagus is given thus: Aureae Petronillae Filiae Dulcissimae ("of the golden Petronilla, the sweetest daughter"). The sarcophagus was discovered, in the very chapel dedicated to her in Old St Peter's, under Pope Sixtus IV, who hastened to inform Louis XI of France. Extant 16th-century notices concerning this sarcophagus assert that the first word was Aur, (Aureliae), so that the martyr's name was Aurelia Petronilla. The second name comes from Petro or Petronius, and, as the name of the great-grandfather of the Christian consul, Titus Flavius Clemens, was Titus Flavius Petro, it is very possible that Petronilla was a relative of the Christian Flavii, who were descended from the senatorial family of the Aurelii. This theory would also explain why Petronilla was buried in the catacomb of the Flavian Domitilla. Like the latter, Petronilla may have suffered during the persecution of Domitian, perhaps not till later.

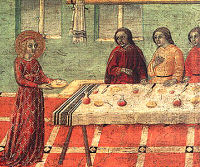
Saint Petronilla, Sano di Pietro

=== Chapel of St Petronilla ===
In 757 the coffin containing the mortal remains of Petronilla was transferred to an old circular building (the mausoleum of Emperor Honorius dating from the end of the 4th century) near Old St Peter's. This building was altered and became the Chapel of St Petronilla.

Her chapel became the burial place for French kings. Her association with the French crown stems from the fact that Charlemagne and Carloman were considered Peter's adopted sons after 800. Petronilla, as the supposed daughter of Peter, became their patroness and of the treaties concluded between the Holy See and the Frankish emperors.

When St Peter's was rebuilt in the 16th century, the old chapel and former mausoleum was demolished and Petronilla's relics were translated to an altar dedicated to her in the upper end of the right side-aisle of the new basilica (near the cupola). The chapel includes embellishments by Michelangelo and Bramante.

Guercino painted an altarpiece called The Burial of St. Petronilla in 1623. In 1730 the painting was moved to the Quirinal Palace. Its place over the altar was taken by a fine mosaic copy executed by Pietro Paolo Cristofari (1685–1743). Guercino's original was shipped to Paris in 1797, was returned to Rome in 1815, and is today in the Capitoline Museums. The painting simultaneously depicts the burial and the welcoming to heaven of the martyred Saint Petronilla. The altar is dedicated to the saint, and contains her relics.

Her feast falls on 31 May. Mass on this day in St. Peter's is offered for France and attended by French residents of Rome. She is patroness of the dauphins of France because a dolphin (in French, dauphin) was reputedly found carved on her sarcophagus.

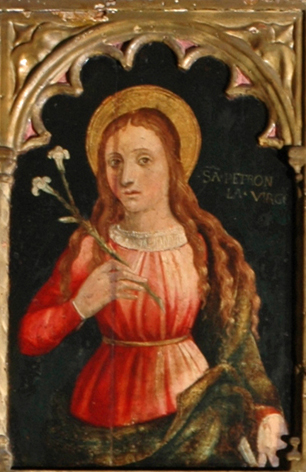
Painting of Saint Petronilla

Ambrogio Lorenzetti painted a Santa Petronilla Altarpiece in the 1340s. The Healing of St Petronilla is the name of a tapestry made for Guillaume de Hellande, Bishop of Beauvais, in the 15th century.

=== St. Petronilla's, Whepstead ===
The only Anglican church dedicated to Saint Petronilla is the parish church of the village of Whepstead in Suffolk. At the time of the English Reformation part of the income of the leper hospital of St Petronilla in Bury St Edmunds came from its holdings in Whepstead, which may explain the village's unusual dedication. In Gloucester a chapel and altar were built to Saint Petronilla in the Abbey built by Osric, a Mercian Prince in 679 AD. This is now probably located beneath the Lady Chapel in the present Norman Abbey.

=== St. Petronilla, Handorf ===
A church St. Petronilla in Handorf, part of Münster, Germany, with a present building from around 1700, has been dedicated to the Saint since the 1030s.

== See also ==
- Saint Petronilla, patron saint archive
