= September 27 =

September 27 this year in various calendars
- Sunday, 27 September 2026
| Akan | Nwonakwasi |
| Armenian | 9 Sahmi 1476 |
| Aztec | Tititl 20, 1 Tōchtli |
| Babylonian | 14 Ululu, 2337 SE |
| Balinese pawukon | Menga, Beteng, Laba, Paing, Aryang, Redite of Ugu, Brahma, Jangur, Sri |
| Bengali | 12 Ashshin, BS 1433 |
| Chinese | Yang Wood Dragon・Emptiness Mansion; Fire Horse Year, Month 8, Day 17 (Qiufen, 11 days until Hanlu) |
| Common Era | 27 September 2026 CE |
| Coptic | 17 Thout, AM 1743 |
| Egyptian | 14 Mechir, 2775 NE |
| Ethiopian | 17 Maskaram, 2019 Amätä Məhrät |
| French Republican | Décade I, Quintidi de Vendémiaire de l'Année 235 de la République |
| Gregorian | 27 September, AD 2026 |
| Hebrew | 16 Tishrei, AM 5787 |
| Hindu | Uttarabhādrapada・Vṛddhi; Solar: 11 Āśvina, 1948 SE; Lunisolar: Pratipada, Kṛishna pakṣa of Bhādrapada, 2083 VE; Rāudra・5127 KY・1,872,845 |
| Icelandic | Sunnudagur, 4 Haustmánuður 2026 |
| Islamic | 14 Rabi' al-thani, AH 1448 (using tabular method) |
| ISO week date | 2026-W39-7 |
| Japanese | 17 Hazuki, Reiwa 8 (Shūbun, 11 days until Kanro) |
| Julian | 14 September, AD 2026 (AM 7534) |
| Julian day | 2461311 |
| Korean | 17 Dakdal, 4359 DE |
| Maya | 13.0.13.17.8; 1 Yax, 1 Lamat |
| Roman | ante diem XVIII Kalendas Octobres, MMDCCLXXIX AUC |
| Solar Hijri | 5 Mehr, SH 1405 |
| Tibetan | 16 khrums, me pho rta 2153 or 1772 or 1000 |

| << | September | | | | | >> |
| Su | Mo | Tu | We | Th | Fr | Sa |
| | | 1 | 2 | 3 | 4 | 5 |
| 6 | 7 | 8 | 9 | 10 | 11 | 12 |
| 13 | 14 | 15 | 16 | 17 | 18 | 19 |
| 20 | 21 | 22 | 23 | 24 | 25 | 26 |
| 27 | 28 | 29 | 30 |
2026

September 27 in recent years
2026 (Sunday)
2025 (Saturday)
2024 (Friday)
2023 (Wednesday)
2022 (Tuesday)
2021 (Monday)
2020 (Sunday)
2019 (Friday)
2018 (Thursday)
2017 (Wednesday)

September 27 is the 270th day of the year (271st in leap years) in the Gregorian calendar; 95 days remain until the end of the year.

== Events ==
=== Pre-1600 ===
- 1066 – William the Conqueror and his army set sail from the mouth of the Somme river, beginning the Norman conquest of England.
- 1331 – The Battle of Płowce is fought, between the Kingdom of Poland and the Teutonic Order. The Poles are defeated but their leaders escape capture.
- 1422 – After the brief Gollub War, the Teutonic Knights sign the Treaty of Melno with Poland and Lithuania.
- 1529 – The Siege of Vienna begins when Suleiman I attacks the city.
- 1540 – The Society of Jesus (Jesuits) receives its charter from Pope Paul III.

=== 1601–1900 ===
- 1605 – The armies of Sweden are defeated by the Polish–Lithuanian Commonwealth in the Battle of Kircholm.
- 1669 – The Venetians surrender the fortress of Candia to the Ottomans, thus ending the 21-year-long Siege of Candia. Crete would remain under Ottoman occupation until 1913.
- 1777 – American Revolution: Lancaster, Pennsylvania becomes the capital of the United States for one day after Congress evacuates Philadelphia.
- 1791 – The National Assembly of France votes to award full citizenship to Jews.
- 1810 – The French army under André Masséna fails to break British forces under the Arthur Wellesley in the battle of Bussaco.
- 1821 – The Army of the Three Guarantees triumphantly enters Mexico City, led by Agustín de Iturbide. The following day Mexico is declared independent.
- 1822 – Jean-François Champollion officially informs the Académie des Inscriptions et Belles Lettres in France that he has deciphered the Rosetta Stone.
- 1825 – The world's first public railway to use steam locomotives, the Stockton and Darlington Railway, is ceremonially opened with the engine Locomotion pulling wagons with coal and passengers from Shildon to Darlington to Stockton.
- 1854 – The paddle steamer SS Arctic, owned by the Collins Line of New York, sinks off the coast of Newfoundland, following a collision with a smaller vessel, the SS Vesta. Only 88 of over 300 people on board survive. About a dozen of the occupants of the Vesta are killed when their lifeboat is hit by the Arctic.
- 1875 – The merchant sailing ship Ellen Southard is wrecked in a storm at Liverpool.

=== 1901–present ===
- 1903 – "Wreck of the Old 97": an American rail disaster, in which 11 people are killed; it later becomes the subject of a popular ballad.
- 1908 – Production of the Model T automobile begins at the Ford Piquette Avenue Plant in Detroit.
- 1916 – Iyasu V is proclaimed deposed as ruler of Ethiopia in a palace coup in favor of his aunt Zewditu.
- 1922 – King Constantine I of Greece abdicates his throne in favor of his eldest son, George II.
- 1928 – The Republic of China is recognized by the United States.
- 1930 – Bobby Jones wins the (pre-Masters) Grand Slam of golf.
- 1938 – The ocean liner Queen Elizabeth is launched in Glasgow.
- 1940 – World War II: The Tripartite Pact is signed in Berlin by Germany, Japan and Italy.
- 1941 – World War II: The Greek National Liberation Front is established with Georgios Siantos as acting leader.
- 1941 – The SS Patrick Henry is launched, becoming the first of more than 2,700 Liberty ships.
- 1942 – World War II: Last day of the Matanikau action on Guadalcanal as United States Marines barely escape after being surrounded by Japanese forces.
- 1944 – World War II: The Kassel Mission results in the largest loss by a USAAF group on any mission during the war.
- 1949 – Zeng Liansong's design is chosen as the flag of the People's Republic of China.
- 1956 – USAF Captain Milburn G. Apt becomes the first person to exceed Mach 3. Shortly thereafter, the Bell X-2 goes out of control and Captain Apt is killed.
- 1959 – Typhoon Vera kills nearly 5,000 people in Japan.
- 1962 – The Yemen Arab Republic is established.
- 1962 – Rachel Carson's book Silent Spring is published, inspiring an environmental movement and the creation of the U.S. Environmental Protection Agency.
- 1964 – The British TSR-2 aircraft XR219 makes its maiden flight.
- 1973 – Texas International Airlines Flight 655 crashes into the Black Fork Mountain Wilderness near Mena, Arkansas, killing all 11 people on board.
- 1975 – The last use of capital punishment in Spain sparks worldwide protests.
- 1977 – Japan Airlines Flight 715 crashes on approach to Sultan Abdul Aziz Shah Airport in Subang, Malaysia, killing 34 of the 79 people on board.
- 1988 – The National League for Democracy is formed by Aung San Suu Kyi and others to fight dictatorship in Myanmar.
- 1992 – Palestinian prisoners went on a 15-day hunger strike.
- 1993 – The Sukhumi massacre takes place in Abkhazia.
- 1996 – The Battle of Kabul ends in a Taliban victory; an Islamic Emirate of Afghanistan is established.
- 1996 – Confusion on a tanker ship results in the Julie N oil spill in Portland, Maine.
- 1998 – The Google internet search engine retroactively claims this date as its birthday.
- 2001 – In Switzerland, a gunman shoots 18 citizens, killing 14 and then himself.
- 2003 – The SMART-1 satellite is launched.
- 2007 – NASA launches the Dawn probe to the asteroid belt.
- 2008 – CNSA astronaut Zhai Zhigang becomes the first Chinese person to perform a spacewalk.
- 2012 – In Minneapolis, a gunman shoots eight people, killing six and injuring 2 and then kills himself.
- 2014 – 63 people are killed in an eruption of Mount Ontake in Japan.
- 2019 – Over two million people participated in worldwide strikes to protest climate change across 2,400 locations worldwide.
- 2020 – Second Nagorno-Karabakh War: Azerbaijan launches an offensive against the self-proclaimed Republic of Artsakh in the Nagorno-Karabakh region, inhabited predominantly by ethnic Armenians.
- 2024 – Hurricane Helene devastates the Carolinas as a tropical storm, killing hundreds and injuring more.

== Births ==
=== Pre-1600 ===
- 808 – Ninmyō, Japanese emperor (died 850)
- 830 – Ermentrude of Orléans, Queen of the Franks (probable year; d. 869)
- 1271 – Wenceslaus II of Bohemia, King of Bohemia and Poland (died 1305)
- 1275 – John II, Duke of Brabant (died 1312)
- 1300 – Adolf, Count Palatine of the Rhine (died 1327)
- 1389 – Cosimo de' Medici, ruler of Florence (died 1464)
- 1433 – Stanisław Kazimierczyk, Polish canon regular and saint (died 1489)
- 1442 – John de la Pole, 2nd Duke of Suffolk (died 1491)
- 1496 – Hieronymus Łaski, Polish diplomat (died 1542)
- 1507 – Guillaume Rondelet, French physician (died 1566)
- 1533 – Stefan Batory, King of Poland (died 1586)
- 1544 – Takenaka Shigeharu, Japanese samurai (died 1579)
- 1552 – Flaminio Scala, Italian playwright and stage actor (died 1624)
- 1598 – Robert Blake, English admiral (died 1657)

=== 1601–1900 ===
- 1601 – Louis XIII of France (died 1643)
- 1627 – Jacques-Bénigne Bossuet, French bishop and theologian (died 1704)
- 1643 – Solomon Stoddard, American pastor and librarian (died 1729)
- 1657 – Sofia Alekseyevna of Russia (died 1704)
- 1677 – Giovanni Carlo Maria Clari, Italian violinist and composer (died 1754)
- 1696 – Alphonsus Maria de' Liguori, Italian bishop and saint (died 1787)
- 1719 – Abraham Gotthelf Kästner, German mathematician and epigrammatist (died 1800)
- 1722 – Samuel Adams, American philosopher and politician, fourth Governor of Massachusetts (died 1803)
- 1729 – Michael Denis, Austrian lepidopterist, author, and poet (died 1800)
- 1739 – Francis Russell, Marquess of Tavistock, Irish politician (died 1767)
- 1765 – Antoine Philippe de La Trémoille, French general (died 1794)
- 1772 – Martha Jefferson Randolph, daughter of Thomas Jefferson who had twelve children (died 1836)
- 1783 – Agustín de Iturbide, Mexican royalist turned insurgent; first emperor of Mexico (died 1824)
- 1803 – Samuel Francis Du Pont, American admiral (died 1865)
- 1805 – George Müller, German-English evangelist and missionary, founded the Ashley Down Orphanage (died 1898)
- 1818 – Hermann Kolbe, German chemist and academic (died 1884)
- 1821 – Henri-Frédéric Amiel, Swiss philosopher, poet, and critic (died 1881)
- 1824 – William "Bull" Nelson, American general (died 1862)
- 1827 – Hiram R. Revels, First person of color to serve in the United States Senate, and in the whole U.S. Congress (died 1901)
- 1830 – William Babcock Hazen, American general (died 1887)
- 1838 – Lawrence Sullivan Ross, American general and politician, 19th Governor of Texas (died 1898)
- 1840 – Alfred Thayer Mahan, American captain and historian (died 1914)
- 1840 – Thomas Nast, German-American cartoonist (died 1902)
- 1842 – Alphonse François Renard, Belgian geologist and petrographer (died 1903)
- 1843 – Gaston Tarry, French mathematician and academic (died 1913)
- 1861 – Corinne Roosevelt Robinson, American poet and author (died 1933)
- 1862 – Louis Botha, first Prime Minister of the self-governing Union of South Africa (died 1919)
- 1864 – Andrej Hlinka, Slovak priest and politician (died 1938)
- 1866 – Eurosia Fabris, Italian saint (died 1932)
- 1871 – Grazia Deledda, Italian novelist and poet, Nobel Prize laureate (died 1936)
- 1873 – Vithalbhai Patel, Indian legislator and political leader (died 1933)
- 1879 – Hans Hahn, Austrian mathematician and philosopher (died 1934)
- 1879 – Frederick Schule, American hurdler and coach (died 1962)
- 1879 – Cyril Scott, English poet and composer (died 1970)
- 1882 – Dorothy Greenhough-Smith, English figure skater and tennis player (died 1965)
- 1885 – Harry Blackstone, Sr., American magician (died 1965)
- 1885 – Charles Benjamin Howard, Canadian businessman and politician (died 1964)
- 1892 – George Bambridge, English diplomat (died 1943)
- 1894 – Lothar von Richthofen, German lieutenant and pilot (died 1922)
- 1896 – Gilbert Ashton, English cricketer (died 1981)
- 1896 – Sam Ervin, American soldier and politician (died 1985)
- 1898 – Vincent Youmans, American composer and producer (died 1946)

=== 1901–present ===
- 1904 – Edvard Kocbek, Slovenian poet and politician (died 1981)
- 1905 – Conrad Heidkamp, German footballer and manager (died 1994)
- 1906 – William Empson, English poet and critic (died 1984)
- 1906 – Jim Thompson, American author and screenwriter (died 1977)
- 1906 – Sergei Varshavsky, Russian art collector and author (died 1980)
- 1907 – Bernard Miles, English actor, director, producer, and screenwriter (died 1991)
- 1907 – Bhagat Singh, Indian socialist revolutionary (disputed with 28 September) (died 1931)
- 1911 – Marcey Jacobson, American-Mexican photographer (died 2009)
- 1913 – Albert Ellis, American psychologist and author (died 2007)
- 1916 – S. Yizhar, Israeli academic and politician (died 2006)
- 1917 – Louis Auchincloss, American novelist and essayist (died 2010)
- 1917 – Carl Ballantine, American magician and actor (died 2009)
- 1917 – William T. Orr, American actor and producer (died 2002)
- 1917 – Benjamin Rubin, American microbiologist (died 2010)
- 1918 – Martin Ryle, English astronomer and author, Nobel Prize laureate (died 1984)
- 1918 – Malcolm Shepherd, 2nd Baron Shepherd (died 2001)
- 1918 – Konstantin Gerchik, Soviet military leader (died 2001)
- 1919 – Jayne Meadows, American actress and author (died 2015)
- 1919 – Charles H. Percy, American lieutenant and politician (died 2011)
- 1919 – James H. Wilkinson, American mathematician and computer scientist (died 1986)
- 1920 – William Conrad, American actor, director, and producer (died 1994)
- 1920 – Alan A. Freeman, English record producer (died 1985)
- 1921 – Miklós Jancsó, Hungarian director and screenwriter (died 2014)
- 1921 – Milton Subotsky, American screenwriter and producer, co-founded Amicus Productions (died 1991)
- 1921 – Bernard Waber, American author and illustrator (died 2013)
- 1922 – Sammy Benskin, American pianist and bandleader (died 1992)
- 1922 – Arthur Penn, American director and producer (died 2010)
- 1924 – Ernest Becker, American-Canadian anthropologist, author, and academic (died 1974)
- 1924 – Bud Powell, American pianist and composer (died 1966)
- 1924 – Fred Singer, Austrian-American physicist and academic (died 2020)
- 1924 – Josef Škvorecký, Czech-Canadian author and publisher (died 2012)
- 1925 – Robert Edwards, English physiologist and academic, Nobel Prize laureate (died 2013)
- 1925 – George Gladir, American author (died 2013)
- 1926 – Steve Stavro, Canadian businessman and philanthropist (died 2006)
- 1927 – Chrysostomos I of Cyprus (died 2007)
- 1927 – Jack Katz, American comic book artist and graphic novel pioneer (died 2025)
- 1927 – Red Rodney, American trumpet player (died 1994)
- 1927 – Romano Scarpa, Italian author and illustrator (died 2005)
- 1927 – Sada Thompson, American actress (died 2011)
- 1928 – Margaret Rule, English archaeologist and historian (died 2015)
- 1929 – Calvin Jones, American pianist, composer, and educator (died 2004)
- 1929 – Bruno Junk, Estonian race walker (died 1995)
- 1929 – Barbara Murray, English actress (died 2014)
- 1930 – Paul Reichmann, Austrian-Canadian businessman, founded Olympia and York (died 2013)
- 1931 – Freddy Quinn, Austrian singer, guitarist, and actor
- 1932 – Geoff Bent, English footballer (died 1958)
- 1932 – Michael Colvin, English captain and politician (died 2000)
- 1932 – Gabriel Loubier, Canadian politician
- 1932 – Oliver E. Williamson, American economist and academic, Nobel Prize laureate (died 2020)
- 1932 – Marcia Neugebauer, American geophysicist
- 1933 – Rodney Cotterill, Danish-English physicist and neuroscientist (died 2007)
- 1933 – Greg Morris, American actor (died 1996)
- 1934 – Wilford Brimley, American actor (died 2020)
- 1934 – Claude Jarman Jr., American actor and producer (died 2025)
- 1934 – Dick Schaap, American sportscaster and author (died 2001)
- 1935 – Al MacNeil, Canadian ice hockey player and coach (died 2025)
- 1936 – Don Cornelius, American television host and producer (died 2012)
- 1936 – Gordon Honeycombe, English actor, playwright, and author (died 2015)
- 1937 – Vasyl Durdynets, Ukrainian politician and diplomat, eighth Prime Minister of Ukraine
- 1938 – Jean-Loup Dabadie, French journalist, songwriter, and screenwriter (died 2020)
- 1939 – Nicholas Haslam, English interior designer and author
- 1939 – Carol Lynn Pearson, American author, poet, and playwright (died 2026)
- 1939 – Kathy Whitworth, American golfer (died 2022)
- 1940 – Josephine Barstow, English soprano and actress
- 1940 – Benoni Beheyt, Belgian cyclist
- 1941 – Peter Bonetti, English footballer and coach (died 2020)
- 1941 – Serge Ménard, Canadian lawyer and politician
- 1941 – Don Nix, American saxophonist, songwriter, and producer
- 1942 – Dith Pran, Cambodian photographer and journalist (died 2008)
- 1942 – Alvin Stardust, English singer and actor (died 2014)
- 1943 – Prince Amedeo, Duke of Aosta (died 2021)
- 1943 – Randy Bachman, Canadian singer-songwriter and guitarist
- 1944 – Angélica María, American-born Mexican singer-songwriter and actress
- 1944 – Gary Sutherland, American baseball player and scout (died 2024)
- 1945 – Jack Goldstein, Canadian-American painter (died 2003)
- 1946 – Nicos Anastasiades, Cypriot lawyer and politician, seventh President of Cyprus
- 1946 – T. C. Cannon, American painter and sculptor (died 1978)
- 1947 – Dick Advocaat, Dutch football manager and former player
- 1947 – Richard Court, Australian politician, 26th Premier of Western Australia
- 1947 – Barbara Dickson, Scottish singer-songwriter and actress
- 1947 – Denis Lawson, Scottish actor, director, and screenwriter
- 1947 – Meat Loaf, American singer-songwriter, producer, and actor (died 2022)
- 1947 – Liz Torres, Puerto Rican-American actress and comedian
- 1948 – Tom Braidwood, Canadian actor, director, and producer
- 1948 – Les Chapman, English footballer and manager
- 1948 – Duncan Fletcher, Rhodesian-Zimbabwean cricketer and coach
- 1948 – Russ Kunkel, American session and touring drummer (Jackson Browne; Lyle Lovett; Tracy Chapman; Linda Ronstadt)
- 1948 – A Martinez, American actor
- 1949 – Graham Richardson, Australian politician (died 2025)
- 1949 – Mike Schmidt, American baseball player
- 1949 – Jahn Teigen, Norwegian singer-songwriter and guitarist (died 2020)
- 1950 – John Marsden, Australian writer (died 2024)
- 1950 – Cary-Hiroyuki Tagawa, Japanese-American actor and martial artist (died 2025)
- 1951 – Geoff Gallop, Australian politician, 27th Premier of Western Australia
- 1951 – Michel Rivard, Canadian singer-songwriter and guitarist
- 1951 – Jim Shooter, American author and illustrator (died 2025)
- 1952 – Katie Fforde, English author
- 1952 – Dumitru Prunariu, Romanian pilot, engineer and cosmonaut
- 1953 – Diane Abbott, English journalist and politician, Shadow Secretary of State for International Development
- 1953 – Mata Amritanandamayi, Indian guru and saint
- 1953 – Claudio Gentile, Italian footballer and manager
- 1953 – Greg Ham, Australian keyboard player, saxophonist and songwriter (died 2012)
- 1954 – Ray Hadley, Australian radio host and sportscaster
- 1954 – Dmitry Sitkovetsky, Russian violinist and conductor
- 1954 – Larry Wall, American computer programmer and author
- 1956 – Steve Archibald, Scottish footballer and manager
- 1956 – Martin Handford, English children's author and illustrator
- 1957 – Bill Athey, English cricketer, footballer, and coach
- 1958 – Shaun Cassidy, American actor, singer, producer, and screenwriter
- 1958 – Irvine Welsh, Scottish author and playwright
- 1959 – Beth Heiden, American speed skater and cyclist
- 1960 – Jean-Marc Barr, German-American actor, director, producer, and screenwriter
- 1962 – Gavin Larsen, New Zealand cricketer and sportscaster
- 1963 – Marc Maron, American comedian, actor, and radio host
- 1964 – Predrag Brzaković, Serbian footballer (died 2012)
- 1964 – Tracy Camp, American computer scientist and academic
- 1964 – Johnny du Plooy, South African boxer (died 2013)
- 1964 – Stephan Jenkins, American singer-songwriter, guitarist, and producer
- 1965 – Steve Kerr, American basketball player, coach and sportscaster
- 1965 – Bernard Lord, Canadian lawyer and politician, 30th Premier of New Brunswick
- 1965 – Peter MacKay, Canadian lawyer and politician, 50th Canadian Minister of Justice
- 1965 – Alexis Stewart, American radio and television host
- 1966 – Debbie Wasserman Schultz, American politician
- 1966 – Stephanie Wilson, American engineer and astronaut
- 1966 – Lorenzo Cherubini, Italian singer-songwriter and rapper
- 1967 – Uche Okechukwu, Nigerian footballer
- 1968 – Mari Kiviniemi, Finnish politician, 41st Prime Minister of Finland
- 1968 – Patrick Muldoon, American actor (died 2026)
- 1970 – Yoshiharu Habu, Japanese chess player and author
- 1970 – Tamara Taylor, Canadian actress
- 1971 – Horacio Sandoval, Mexican illustrator
- 1972 – Sylvia Crawley, American basketball player and coach
- 1972 – Clara Hughes, Canadian cyclist and speed skater
- 1972 – Gwyneth Paltrow, American actress, blogger, and businesswoman
- 1972 – Craig L. Rice, American politician
- 1973 – Vratislav Lokvenc, Czech footballer
- 1973 – Stanislav Pozdnyakov, Russian fencer
- 1973 – Indira Varma, British actress
- 1974 – Carrie Brownstein, American singer-songwriter, guitarist, and actress
- 1976 – Matt Harding, American video game designer and dancer
- 1976 – Jason Phillips, American baseball player and coach
- 1976 – Francesco Totti, Italian footballer
- 1977 – Andrus Värnik, Estonian javelin thrower
- 1978 – Brad Arnold, American singer-songwriter (died 2026)
- 1978 – Jon Rauch, American baseball player
- 1978 – Mihaela Ursuleasa, Romanian pianist (died 2012)
- 1979 – Jon Garland, American baseball player
- 1979 – Zita Görög, Hungarian actress and model
- 1979 – Christian Jones, Australian race car driver
- 1979 – Michael Kosta, American comedian
- 1979 – Steve Simpson, Australian rugby league player
- 1980 – Asashōryū Akinori, Mongolian sumo wrestler, the 68th Yokozuna
- 1980 – Ehron VonAllen, American singer-songwriter and producer
- 1981 – Sophie Crumb, American author and illustrator
- 1981 – Brendon McCullum, New Zealand cricketer
- 1981 – Lakshmipathy Balaji, Indian cricketer
- 1982 – Anna Camp, American actress
- 1982 – Jon McLaughlin, American singer-songwriter, guitarist, and producer
- 1982 – Markus Rosenberg, Swedish footballer
- 1982 – Lil Wayne, American rapper, producer, and actor
- 1982 – Tan White, American basketball player
- 1982 – Darrent Williams, American football player (died 2007)
- 1983 – Jay Bouwmeester, Canadian ice hockey player
- 1983 – Jeon Hye-bin, South Korean actress and singer
- 1983 – Chris Quinn, American basketball player and coach
- 1984 – Paul Bevan, Australian footballer
- 1984 – Davide Capello, Italian footballer
- 1984 – John Lannan, American baseball player
- 1984 – Avril Lavigne, Canadian singer-songwriter, actress, and fashion designer
- 1984 – Wouter Weylandt, Belgian cyclist (died 2011)
- 1985 – Massimo Bertocchi, Canadian decathlete
- 1985 – Anthony Morrow, American basketball player
- 1985 – Daniel Pudil, Czech footballer
- 1985 – Ibrahim Touré, Ivorian footballer (died 2014)
- 1986 – Vin Mazzaro, American baseball player
- 1986 – Ricardo Risatti, Argentinian race car driver
- 1986 – Matt Shoemaker, American baseball player
- 1987 – Ádám Bogdán, Hungarian footballer
- 1987 – Austin Carlile, American singer-songwriter
- 1987 – Vanessa James, French figure skater
- 1987 – Olga Puchkova, Russian tennis player
- 1988 – Lisa Ryzih, German pole vaulter
- 1989 – Park Tae-hwan, South Korean swimmer
- 1990 – Dion Lewis, American football player
- 1991 – Ousmane Barry, Guinean footballer
- 1991 – Simona Halep, Romanian tennis player
- 1991 – Thomas Mann, American actor
- 1991 – Anete Paulus, Estonian footballer
- 1991 – Rio Uchida, Japanese model and actress
- 1992 – Lachlan Burr, Australian rugby league player
- 1992 – Sam Lerner, American actor
- 1992 – Ryan O'Shaughnessy, Irish singer-songwriter and actor
- 1992 – Granit Xhaka, Swiss footballer
- 1993 – Lisandro Magallán, Argentinian footballer
- 1993 – Ryan Murray, Canadian ice hockey player
- 1993 – Monica Puig, Puerto Rican-American tennis player
- 1993 – Vinnie Sunseri, American football player
- 1994 – Dylan Walker, Australian rugby league player
- 1994 – Sayak Chakraborty, Indian television actor
- 1995 – Kwon Eun-bi, South Korean singer and musical actress
- 1995 – Christian Wood, American basketball player
- 1997 – Jaiden Animations, American YouTuber and animator
- 1998 – Ioana Mincă, Romanian tennis player
- 2001 – Caleb Love, American basketball player
- 2001 – David Malukas, American race car driver
- 2002 – Jenna Ortega, American actress

== Deaths ==
=== Pre-1600 ===
- 765 – Pugu Huai'en, Chinese general during the Tang dynasty
- 936 – Kyŏn Hwŏn, king of Later Baekje (born 867)
- 1111 – Vekenega, Croatian Benedictine abbess
- 1115 – Bonfilius, Italian saint and bishop of Foligno (born c. 1040)
- 1125 – Richeza of Berg, Duchess of Bohemia (born c.1095)
- 1194 – Renaud de Courtenay, Anglo-Norman nobleman (born 1125)
- 1249 – Raymond VII, Count of Toulouse (born 1197)
- 1404 – William of Wykeham, English bishop (born 1320)
- 1536 – Felice della Rovere, illegitimate daughter of Pope Julius II (born 1483)
- 1557 – Emperor Go-Nara of Japan (born 1497)
- 1590 – Pope Urban VII (born 1521)

=== 1601–1900 ===
- 1612 – Piotr Skarga, Polish Jesuit and polemicist (born 1536)
- 1623 – John VII, Count of Nassau-Siegen (born 1561)
- 1637 – Lorenzo Ruiz, Filipino saint (born c.1600)
- 1651 – Maximilian I, Elector of Bavaria (born 1573)
- 1657 – Olimpia Maidalchini, Roman noble (born 1591)
- 1660 – Vincent de Paul, French priest and saint (born 1581)
- 1674 – Robert Arnauld d'Andilly, French writer (born 1589)
- 1700 – Pope Innocent XII (born 1615)
- 1719 – George Smalridge, English bishop (born 1662)
- 1730 – Laurence Eusden, English poet and author (born 1688)
- 1735 – Peter Artedi, Swedish ichthyologist and zoologist (born 1705)
- 1742 – Hugh Boulter, Irish archbishop (born 1672)
- 1783 – Étienne Bézout, French mathematician and theorist (born 1730)
- 1832 – Karl Christian Friedrich Krause, German philosopher and author (born 1781)
- 1833 – Raja Ram Mohan Roy, Indian humanitarian and reformer (born 1772)
- 1838 – Bernard Courtois, French chemist and pharmacist (born 1777)
- 1876 – Braxton Bragg, American general (born 1817)
- 1886 – Charles Gordon Greene, American journalist and politician (born 1804)
- 1891 – Ivan Goncharov, Russian author and critic (born 1812)
- 1898 – Thomas Joseph Byrnes, Australian politician, 12th Premier of Queensland (born 1860)

=== 1901–present ===
- 1911 – Auguste Michel-Lévy, French geologist and academic (born 1844)
- 1915 – Remy de Gourmont, French novelist, poet, and critic (born 1858)
- 1917 – Edgar Degas, French painter and sculptor (born 1834)
- 1919 – Adelina Patti, Italian-French opera singer (born 1843)
- 1921 – Engelbert Humperdinck, German composer and educator (born 1854)
- 1934 – Ellen Willmott, English horticulturalist (born 1858)
- 1935 – Alan Gray, English composer and organist (born 1855)
- 1940 – Walter Benjamin, German philosopher and critic (born 1892)
- 1940 – Julius Wagner-Jauregg, Austrian physician and neuroscientist, Nobel Prize laureate (born 1857)
- 1942 – Douglas Albert Munro, United States Coast Guard signalman, posthumously awarded Medal of Honor, (born 1919)
- 1944 – Aimee Semple McPherson, Canadian-American evangelist, founded the International Church of the Foursquare Gospel (born 1890)
- 1956 – Gerald Finzi, English composer and educator (born 1901)
- 1956 – Babe Didrikson Zaharias, American basketball player and golfer (born 1911)
- 1960 – Sylvia Pankhurst, English activist (born 1882)
- 1961 – H.D., American poet, novelist, and memoirist (born 1886)
- 1965 – Clara Bow, American actress (born 1905)
- 1965 – William Stanier, English engineer, co-designed the London, Midland and Scottish Railway (born 1876)
- 1967 – Felix Yusupov, Russian husband of Princess Irina Alexandrovna of Russia (born 1887)
- 1972 – S. R. Ranganathan, Indian mathematician, librarian, and academic (born 1892)
- 1974 – Silvio Frondizi, Argentinian lawyer and academic (born 1907)
- 1975 – Jack Lang, Australian lawyer and politician, 23rd Premier of New South Wales (born 1876)
- 1979 – Gracie Fields, English actress and singer (born 1898)
- 1979 – Jimmy McCulloch, Scottish singer-songwriter and guitarist (born 1953)
- 1981 – Robert Montgomery, American actor, singer, director, and producer (born 1904)
- 1983 – Wilfred Burchett, Australian journalist and author (born 1911)
- 1984 – Chronis Exarhakos, Greek actor (born 1932)
- 1985 – Lloyd Nolan, American actor (born 1902)
- 1986 – Cliff Burton, American bass player and songwriter (born 1962)
- 1991 – Joe Hulme, English footballer and cricketer (born 1904)
- 1992 – Zhang Leping, Chinese comic artist (born 1910)
- 1993 – Jimmy Doolittle, American general, Medal of Honor recipient (born 1896)
- 1993 – Fraser MacPherson, Canadian saxophonist and educator (born 1928)
- 1996 – Mohammad Najibullah, Afghan physician and politician, seventh President of Afghanistan (born 1947)
- 1997 – Walter Trampler, American viola player and educator (born 1915)
- 1998 – Doak Walker, American football player (born 1927)
- 2003 – Jean Lucas, French racing driver (born 1927)
- 2003 – Donald O'Connor, American actor, singer, and dancer (born 1925)
- 2004 – John E. Mack, American psychiatrist and author (born 1929)
- 2005 – Ronald Golias, Brazilian comedian and actor (born 1929)
- 2005 – Mary Lee Settle, American novelist, essayist, and memoirist (born 1918)
- 2006 – Helmut Kallmeyer, German chemist and soldier (born 1910)
- 2007 – Dale Houston, American singer-songwriter (born 1940)
- 2007 – Kenji Nagai, Japanese photographer and journalist (born 1957)
- 2008 – Henri Pachard, American director and producer (born 1939)
- 2009 – Ivan Dykhovichny, Russian director and screenwriter (born 1947)
- 2010 – Balaji Sadasivan, Singaporean neurosurgeon and politician, Minister of Foreign Affairs for Singapore (born 1955)
- 2011 – David Croft, English director, producer, and screenwriter (born 1922)
- 2011 – Imre Makovecz, Hungarian architect (born 1935)
- 2011 – Johnny "Country" Mathis, American singer-songwriter (born 1933)
- 2012 – Eddie Bert, American trombonist (born 1922)
- 2012 – Herbert Lom, Czech-English actor (born 1917)
- 2013 – Oscar Castro-Neves, Brazilian-American guitarist, composer, and conductor (born 1940)
- 2013 – Mauricio González-Gordon y Díez, Spanish sherry maker and conservationist (born 1923)
- 2014 – Gaby Aghion, French fashion designer, founded Chloé (born 1921)
- 2014 – Wally Hergesheimer, Canadian ice hockey player (born 1927)
- 2014 – Abdelmajid Lakhal, Tunisian actor and director (born 1939)
- 2014 – James Traficant, American lawyer and politician (born 1941)
- 2015 – Syed Ahmed, Indian author and politician, 16th Governor of Manipur (born 1945)
- 2015 – Pietro Ingrao, Italian journalist and politician (born 1915)
- 2015 – Kallen Pokkudan, Indian activist and author (born 1937)
- 2015 – Frank Tyson, English-Australian cricketer, coach, and journalist (born 1930)
- 2017 – Hugh Hefner, American publisher, founder of Playboy Enterprises (born 1926)
- 2018 – Kavita Mahajan, Indian author and translator (born 1967)
- 2018 – Michael Payton, American football quarterback (born 1970)
- 2018 – Manoharsinhji Pradyumansinhji, Indian nobleman and politician (born 1935)
- 2018 – Marty Balin, American singer, co-founder of the band Jefferson Airplane (born 1942)
- 2021 – Madeleine Tchicaya, Ivorian politician (born 1930)
- 2023 – Michael Gambon, Irish-English actor (born 1940)
- 2024 – Hassan Nasrallah, Lebanese politician, 3rd Secretary-General of Hezbollah (born 1960)
- 2024 – Maggie Smith, English actress (born 1934)
- 2025 – Russell M. Nelson, 17th President of the Church of Jesus Christ of Latter-day Saints (born 1924)
- 2026 – Mighty Sparrow, Grenadian calypso musician (born 1935)
- 2026 – Pac, English professional wrestler (born 1986)

== Holidays and observances ==
- Christian feast days:
  - Adheritus
  - Bonfilius
  - Caius of Milan
  - Hiltrude of Liessies
  - Vincent de Paul
  - Cosmas and Damian
  - September 27 (Eastern Orthodox liturgics)
- Consumación de la Independencia (Mexico)
- French Community Holiday (French community of Belgium)
- Independence Day (Turkmenistan), celebrates the independence of Turkmenistan from USSR in 1991.
- Meskel (Ethiopian and Eritrean Orthodox Church, following Julian calendar, September 28 on leap years)
- National Gay Men's HIV/AIDS Awareness Day (United States)
- Polish Underground State's Day (Poland)
- World Tourism Day (International)
