= September 27 (Eastern Orthodox liturgics) =

Day in the Eastern Orthodox liturgical calendar

Eastern Orthodox liturgical calendar
September 26	September 27	September 28
September 27 O.S. ≍ October 10 N.S. September 27 N.S ≍ September 14 O.S.

An Eastern Orthodox cross

September 27 in Eastern Orthodox liturgical calendars is a feast day and a day of commemoration of saints and martyrs. Although some Orthodox churches use the Revised Julian Calendar and others use the traditional Julian calendar, the fixed commemorations for their respective September 27 are broadly the same, no matter which calendar is used. (Note: Despite the dates being the same, the days to which they refer typically differ by 13 days. The notation Old Style or O.S. is sometimes used to indicate a date in the traditional Julian Calendar (the "Old Calendar"). The notation New Style or N.S. indicates a date in the Revised Julian calendar (the "New Calendar").)

== Saints ==
- Apostles Mark of Bibloupolis, (Note: "At Byblos, in Phoenicia, St. Mark, bishop, who is also called John by blessed Luke.") Aristarchus, and Zenas the Lawyer, of the Seventy (1st century) (Note: Name days celebrated today include: Zenon, Zinon (Ζήνων).)
- Martyr Epicharis of Rome (c. 298) (Note: "At Rome, St. Epicharis, wife of a senator, who, in the same persecution, was scourged with leaded whips, and struck with the sword.")
- Martyr Gaiana. (Note: The Synaxaria do not contain any biographical details. However other sources record that she was martyred together with Martyr Epicharis.)
- Hieromarytr Philemon the Bishop, and martyr Fortunatus.
- Holy 15 martyrs drowned at sea. (Note: Some sources say there were 25 martyrs.)
- Martyrs Callistratus of Carthage and 49 martyrs with him (304)
- Saint Flavian I of Antioch, Archbishop of Antioch (404) (see also: February 16)
- Venerable Ignatius, Abbot of the Monastery of the Deep Stream in Asia Minor (963–975)

== Pre-Schism Western saints ==
- Saint Caius of Milan (Gaius), by tradition the first Bishop of Milan in Italy (1st century) (Note: "At Milan, the holy bishop Caius, a disciple of the blessed apostle Barnabas, who passed calmly to rest after suffering severely in the persecution of Nero." Bishop for twenty-four years, he baptised the future martyr St Vitalis and his sons Sts Gervase and Protase.)
- Saint Adheritus (Abderitus, Adhentus, Adery), a Greek by birth, he succeeded St Apollinaris as Bishop of Ravenna in Italy (2nd century) (Note: "At Ravenna, St. Aderitus, bishop and confessor." His relics are enshrined in the Basilica of Classe near Ravenna.)
- Saint Deodatus, a martyr in Sora in central Italy.
- Saints Fidentius and Terence, martyrs venerated in Todi in central Italy. (Note: "At Todi, the holy martyrs Fidentius and Terence, under the same Diocletian.")
- Saints Florentinus and Hilary, two hermits martyred in France by barbarians. (Note: "At Sion, in Switzerland, St. Florentinus, martyr, who was put to the sword with blessed Hilary, after his tongue had been cut out.")
- Saint Ceraunus (Ceran), Bishop of Paris in France (c. 614)
- Martyr Sigeberht of East Anglia, King of the East Angles (635)
- Saint Barrog (Barrwg, Barnoch, Barry), a disciple of St Cadoc of Wales, hermit (7th century) (Note: "At Barry Island, on the coast of Glamorganshire, the festival of ST. BARRUC, otherwise called BARROG or BARNOCH. This holy solitary chose for his abode the little island which derives its present name from him. There he served God in a blessed retreat from this world, and, persevering to the end in his holy course, died and was buried in the same place.")
- Saint Hiltrude, a hermit near the monastery of Liessies in France (c. 790)
- Saints Adolphus and John, two brothers born in Seville in Spain of a Moorish father and a Christian mother, martyred in Cordoba under Abderrahman II (c. 850) (Note: "At Cordova, the holy martyrs Adulphus and John, brothers, who won the martyr's crown in the Arabian persecution.")
- Saint Marcellus, born in Ireland, he became a monk at St Gall in Switzerland (c. 869)

== Post-Schism Orthodox saints ==
- Venerable Sabbatius, Wonderworker of Solovki (1435)
- New Hieromartyr Anthimus the Georgian, Metropolitan of Wallachia(1716) (Note: He was born in Georgia but was taken into slavery on a return trip from Russia and was bought by Patriarch Dositheus of Jerusalem. He gained fame as a skilled artist and calligrapher. He went to Wallachia at the invitation of St. Constantine Brâncoveanu and was consecrated as a bishop in 1705, later becoming the metropolitan of Wallachia in 1709. He was eventually martyred by Turkish soldiers. He is also canonized by the Georgian Church.)
- New Virgin-martyr Aquilina of Zagliveri, Thessalonica (1764)
- Saint Archippus, Schemamonk of Glinsk Hermitage (1896)
- Saint Rachel, Schemanun of Borodino Convent (1928)

=== New martyrs and confessors ===
- New Hieromartyr Demetrius Shishokin, Priest (1918)
- New Hieromartyr Herman (Kosolapov), Bishop of Volsk (1919) (Note: See: (in Russian) Герман (Косолапов). Википедии. (Russian Wikipedia).)
- New Hieromartyr Michael Platonov, Priest (1919)
- New Hieromartyr Peter (Polyansky), Metropolitan of Krutitsy (1937)
- New Hieromartyr Theodore Bogoyavlensky, Priest (1937)

== Other commemorations ==
- Commemoration of the vision and speechlessness of Zachariah. (Note: The commemoration of the vision and speechlessness of the Prophet Zachariah is recorded in the Jerusalemitic Canonarion (page 112). His feast day is on September 5.)

== Icon gallery ==
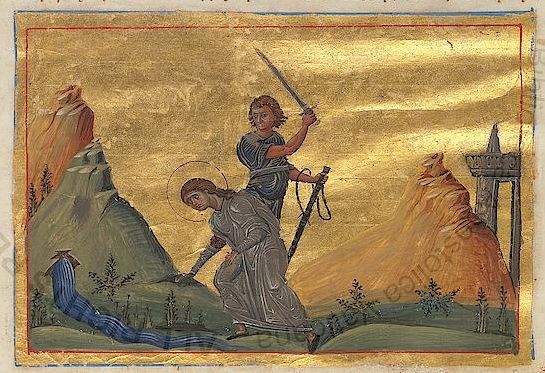
Martyr Epicharis of Rome.
(Menologion of Basil II, 10th century).

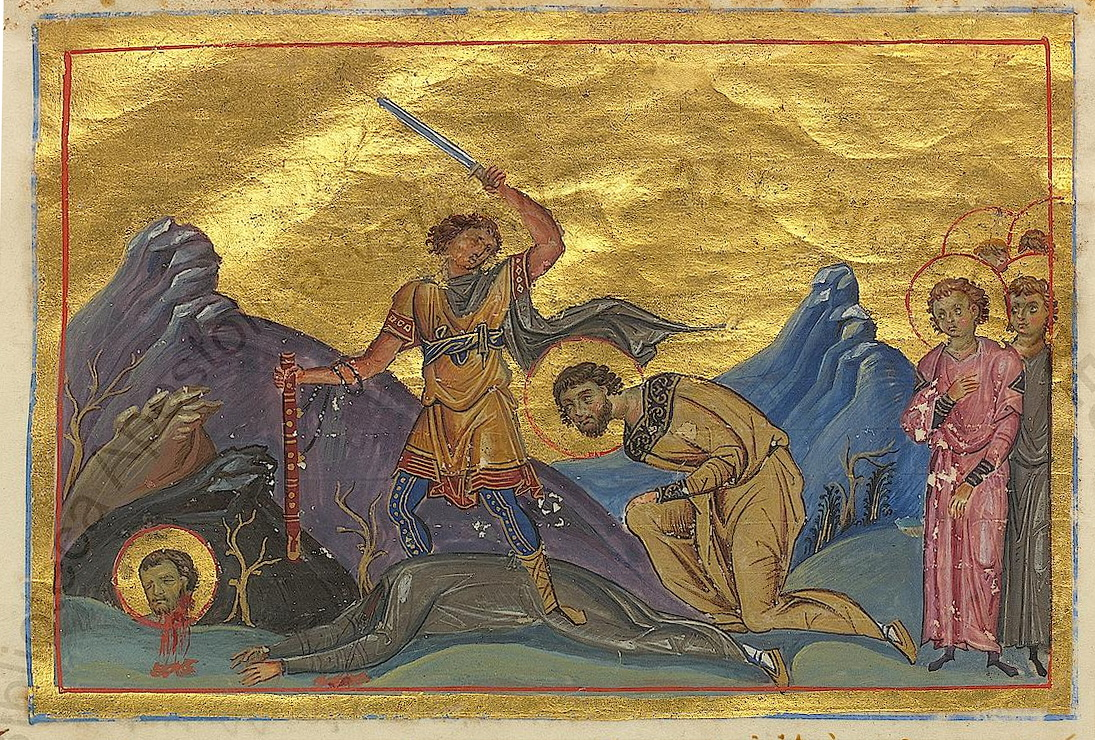
Martyrs Callistratus of Carthage and 49 martyrs.
(Menologion of Basil II, 10th century).

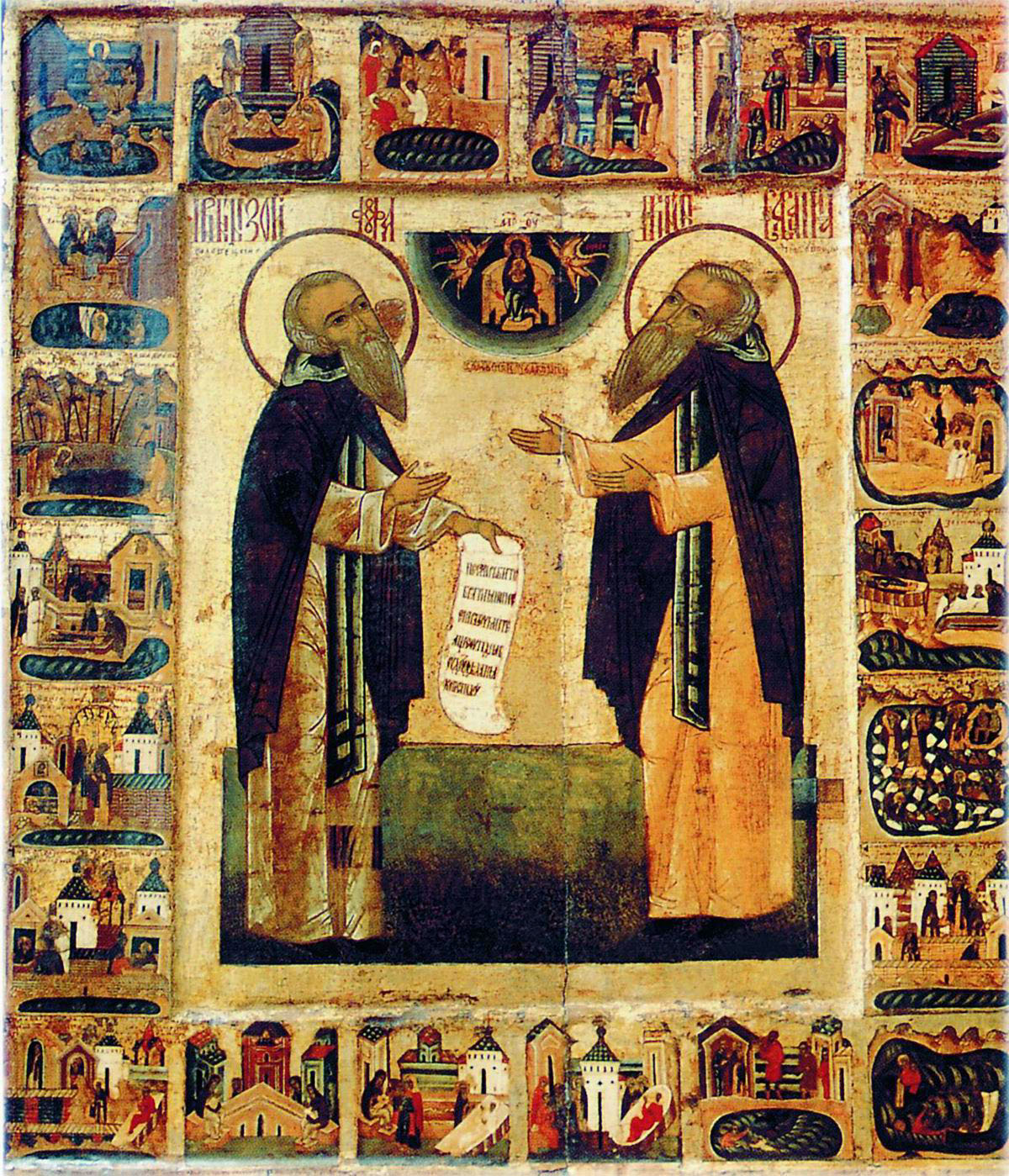
Saints Zosimas (left) and Sabbatius (right) of Solovki.

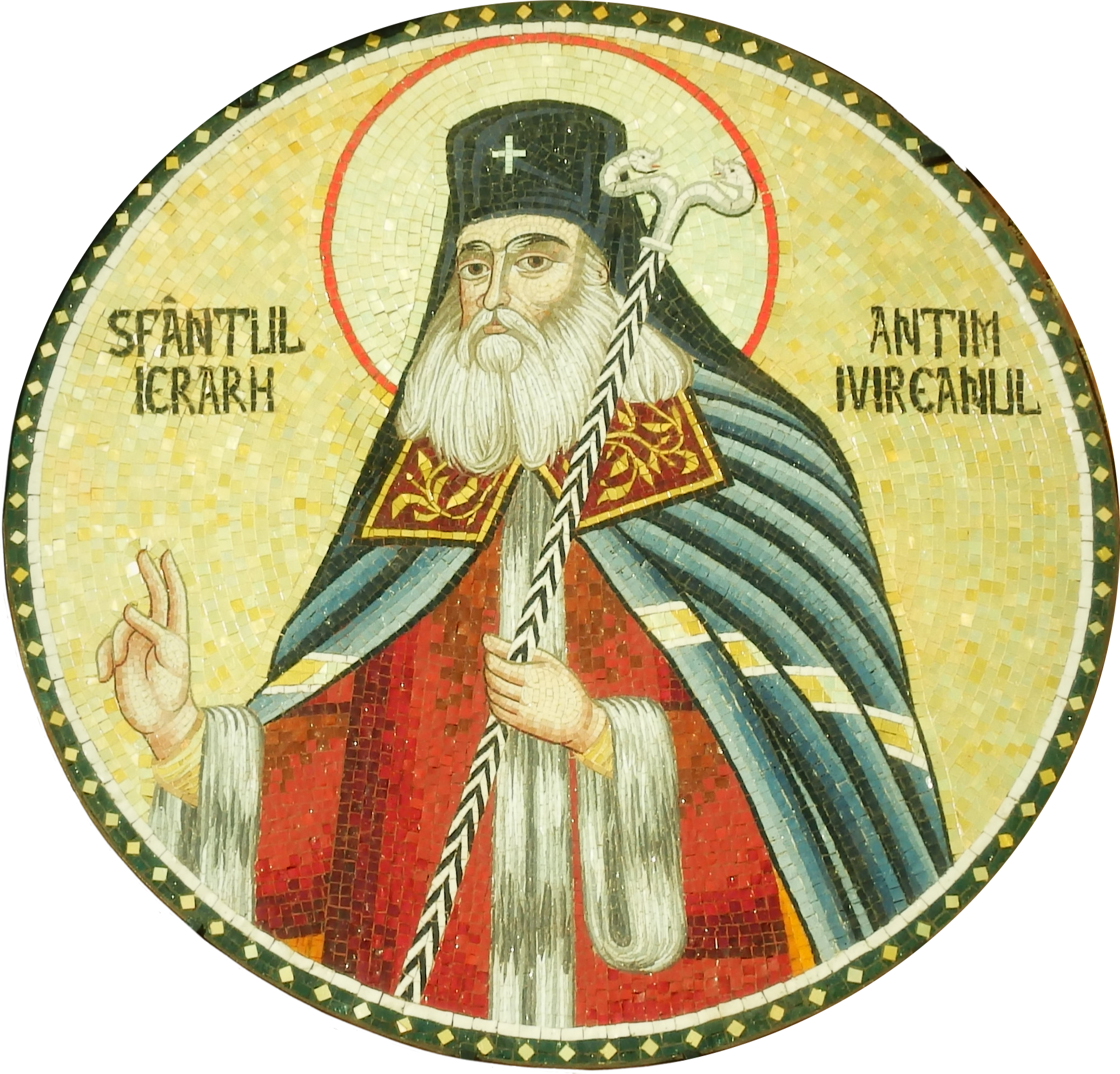
New Hieromartyr Anthimus the Georgian, Metropolitan of Wallachia.

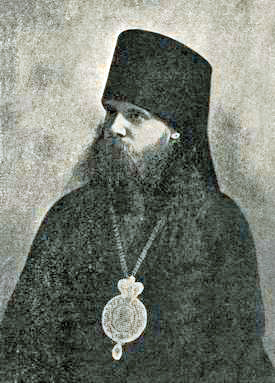
New Hieromartyr Herman (Kosolapov), Bishop of Volsk.

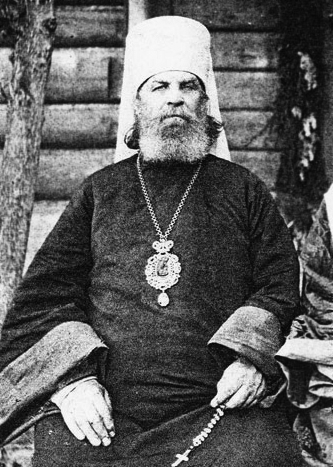
New Hieromartyr Peter (Polyansky), Metropolitan of Krutitsy.

== Sources ==
- September 27/October 10. Orthodox Calendar (PRAVOSLAVIE.RU).
- October 10 / September 27. HOLY TRINITY RUSSIAN ORTHODOX CHURCH (A parish of the Patriarchate of Moscow).
- September 27. OCA - The Lives of the Saints.
- The Autonomous Orthodox Metropolia of Western Europe and the Americas (ROCOR). St. Hilarion Calendar of Saints for the year of our Lord 2004. St. Hilarion Press (Austin, TX). p. 72.
- The Twenty-Seventh Day of the Month of September. Orthodoxy in China.
- September 27. Latin Saints of the Orthodox Patriarchate of Rome.
- The Roman Martyrology. Transl. by the Archbishop of Baltimore. Last Edition, According to the Copy Printed at Rome in 1914. Revised Edition, with the Imprimatur of His Eminence Cardinal Gibbons. Baltimore: John Murphy Company, 1916. pp. 298–299.
- Rev. Richard Stanton. A Menology of England and Wales, or, Brief Memorials of the Ancient British and English Saints Arranged According to the Calendar, Together with the Martyrs of the 16th and 17th Centuries. London: Burns & Oates, 1892. p. 460.

Greek Sources

- Great Synaxaristes: (in Greek) 27 ΣΕΠΤΕΜΒΡΙΟΥ. ΜΕΓΑΣ ΣΥΝΑΞΑΡΙΣΤΗΣ.
- (in Greek) Συναξαριστής. 27 Σεπτεμβρίου. ECCLESIA.GR. (H ΕΚΚΛΗΣΙΑ ΤΗΣ ΕΛΛΑΔΟΣ).
- (in Greek) 27/09/2016. Ορθόδοξος Συναξαριστής.

Russian Sources

- (in Russian) 10 октября (27 сентября). Православная Энциклопедия под редакцией Патриарха Московского и всея Руси Кирилла (электронная версия). (Orthodox Encyclopedia - Pravenc.ru).
- (in Russian) 27 сентября по старому стилю / 10 октября по новому стилю. Русская Православная Церковь - Православный церковный календарь на 2016 год.
