= Hiltrude of Liessies =

French Catholic nun and virgin saint

Saint Hiltrude
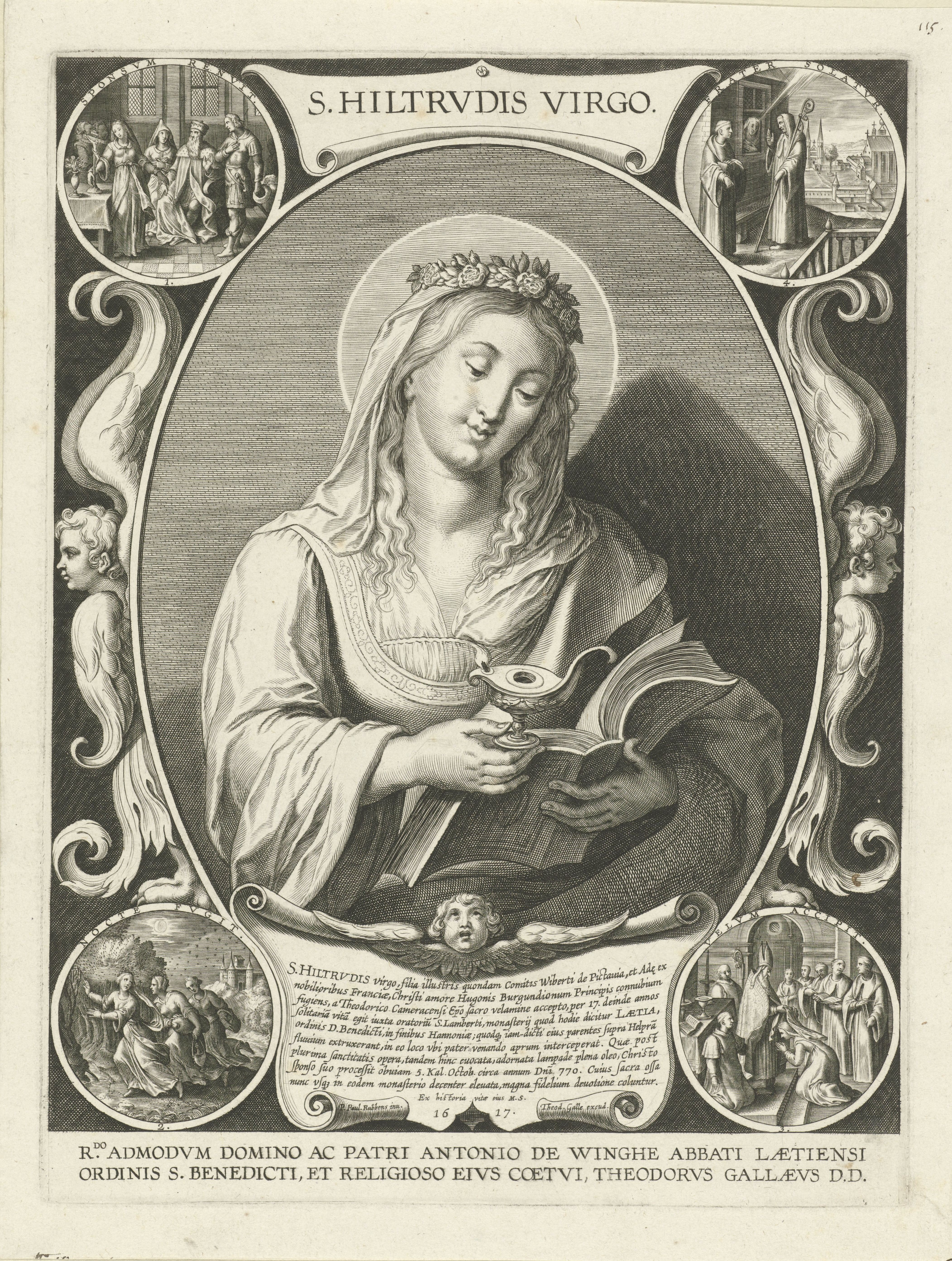
- S. Hiltrvdis Virgo, attributed to Theodore Galle, after Peter Paul Rubens (1617)

Virgin
- Born: 740/750
- Died: 27 September c. 790; Liessies Abbey
- Venerated in: Catholic Church
- Canonized: 11th century
- Feast: 27 September
- Attributes: Lamp, candle
- Patronage: Fever

Hiltrude of Liessies (died late 700s) was a French Catholic nun and saint. She is commemorated on September 27.

== Life ==
Hiltrude was the daughter of Ada, a Frankish noblewoman, and Wibert, Count of Poitiers, who owned lands between the Sambre and Meuse rivers. He founded Liessies Abbey. Hilrude's brother, Guntrad, was the first abbot.

She wished to retire and live the life of a nun, but her parents wanted her to marry a Burgundian lord. She took the veil, with the blessing of the bishop of Cambrai. The suitor married her sister.

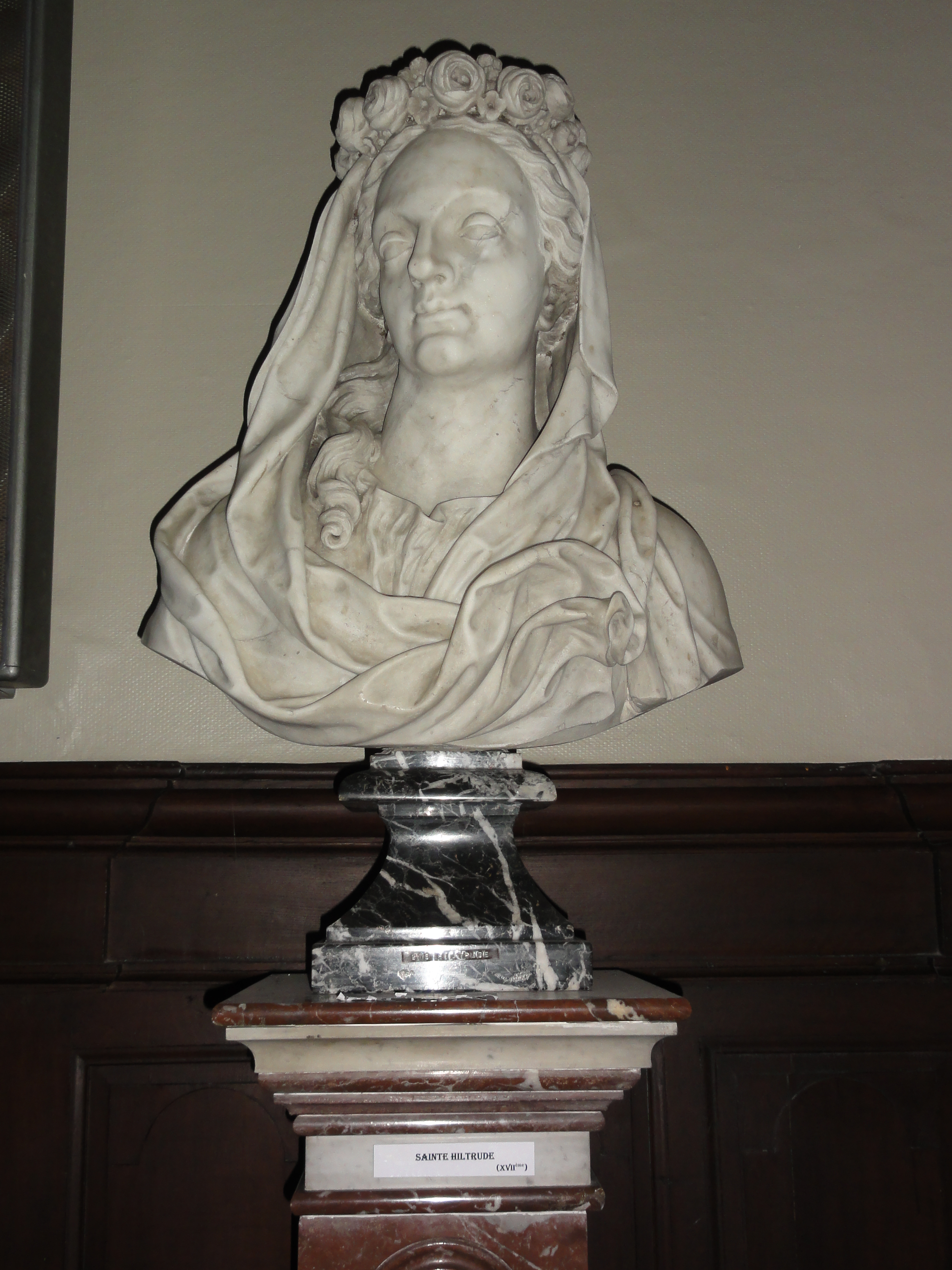
Bust of Saint Hiltrude, Nord, France

Her brother provided her with a cell attached to the abbey chapel. There she lived as a nun, participating in the liturgical life of the abbey. Her parents gave her an estate from Molhain to Yeaux for her life.

Later, following her example, several daughters of lords decided to join her, allowing the creation in 752 of a female annex. Hiltrude died on September 27 around 800.

== Veneration ==
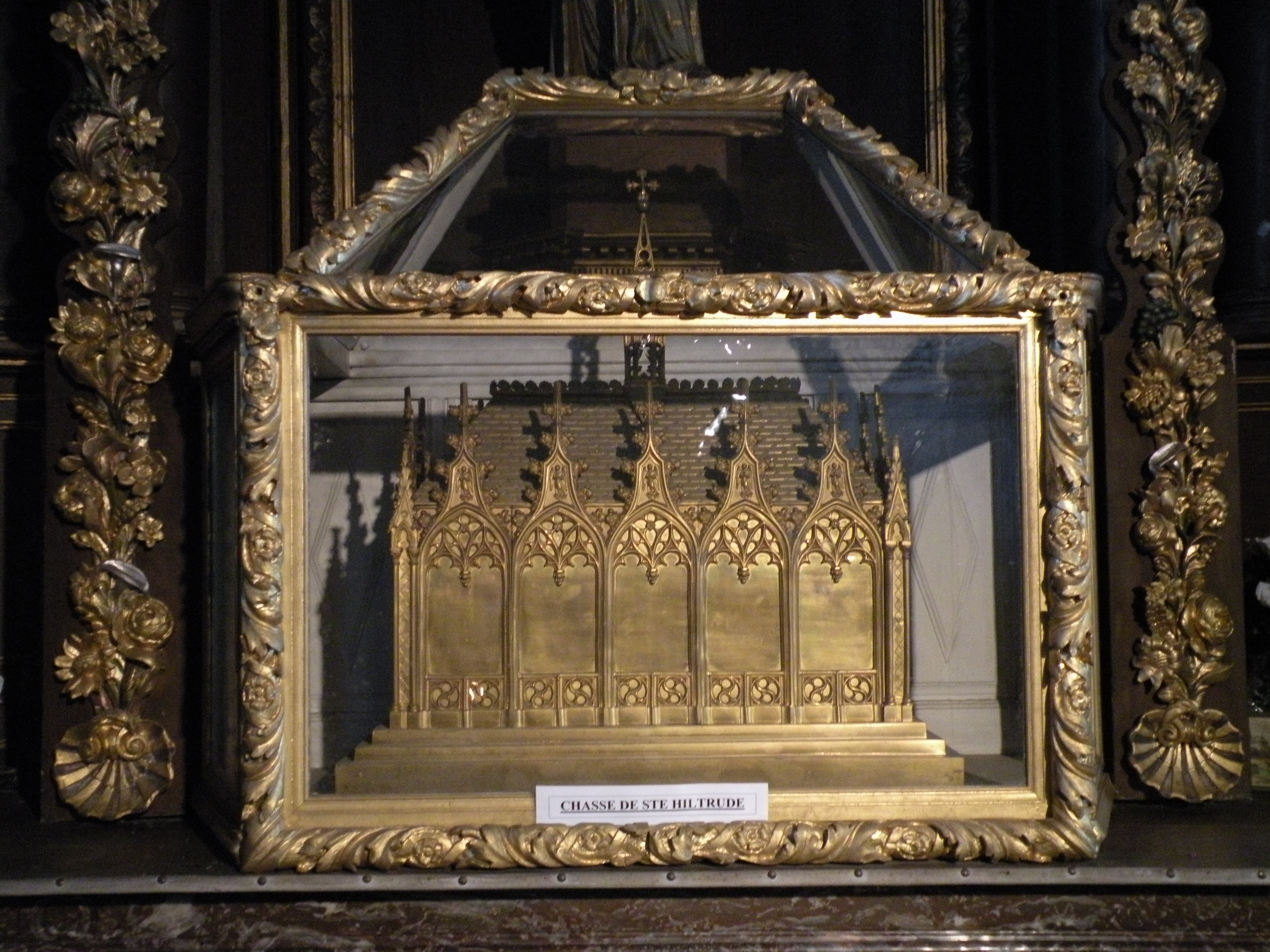
Chasse of Saint Hiltrude in the Church of Saint Hiltrude, Liessies

Her fame for sanctity grew over the centuries and on 17 September 1004 the bishop of Cambrai, Erluino, had her tomb opened, "elevating" her relics. Louis de Blois, abbot of Liessies contributed to the development of the cult. In 1587 her skull were placed in a new reliquary in silver. During the Thirty Years’ War the relics were saved in Mons, where in 1641 they were placed in an urn.
