= Epicharis (martyr) =

Name of two Christian martyrs

Epicharis is the name of two Christian martyrs.

== 250 ==
Her feast day is 9 January (the day of her martyrdom) in the Roman Catholic Church.

Born in Africa, she was martyred in 250 with Felix, Jucundus, Secundus, Vitalis, and seven other companions. An Epictetus, a bishop, was recorded by St. Cyprian.

== 300 ==
Said to be the wife of a Roman senator, she was martyred in Byzantium or Asia Minor in 300. Her feast day is September 27 in the Eastern Orthodox and Roman Catholic churches.

Some sources give her as a lady of a senatorial family, who was scourged and then smitten with the sword in Rome in the persecution of Diocletian.
