= Louis de Blois =

Flemish monk (1506–1566)

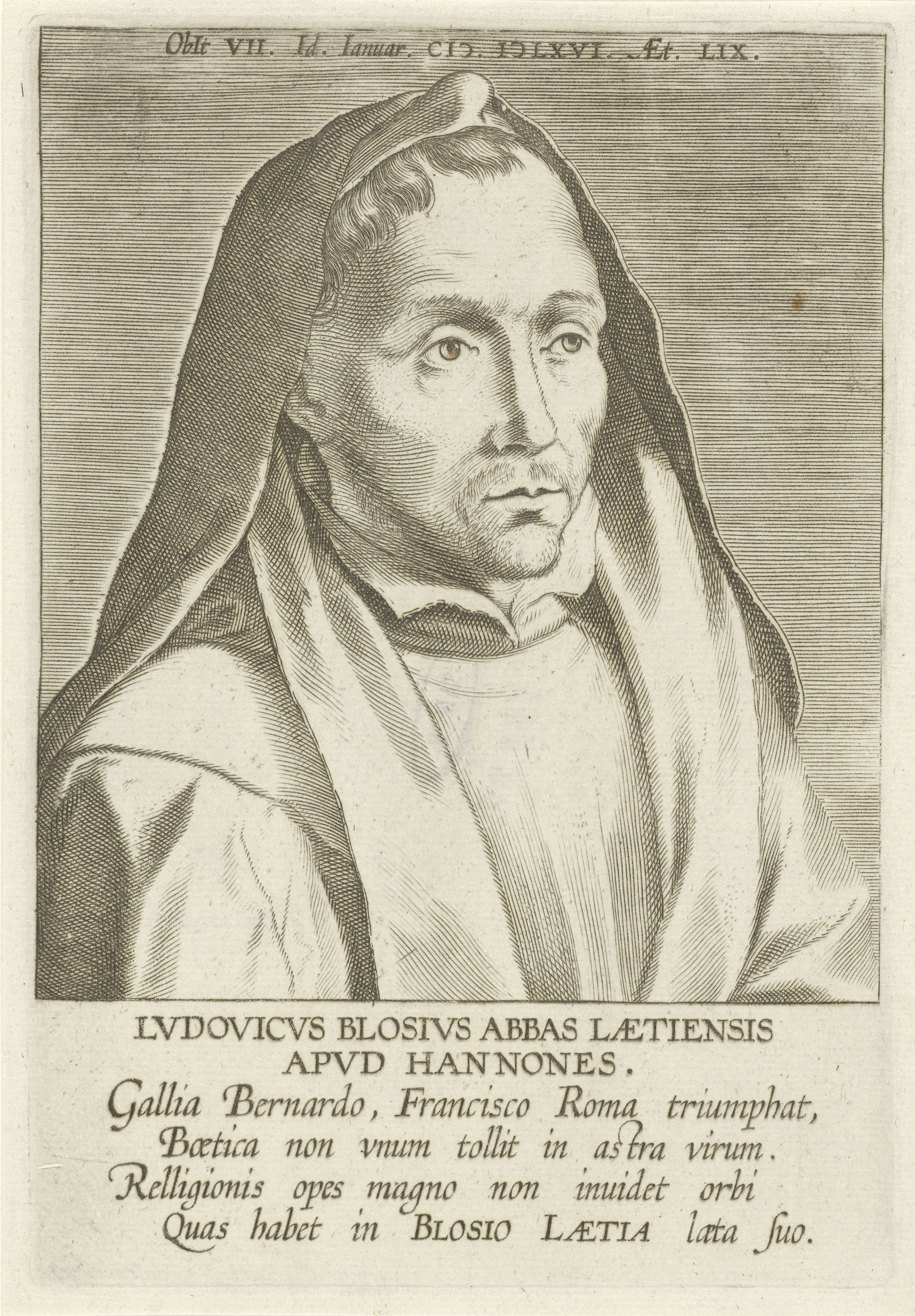
17th century engraving

Louis de Blois O.S.B. (October 1506 – 7 January 1566) was a Flemish monk and mystical writer, generally known under the name of Blosius.

== Life ==
Louis was born at the château of Donstienne, near Liège, of an illustrious family to which several crowned heads were allied. He was one of the ten children born to Adrian de Blois, Sieur of Jumigny, and his wife Catharine Barbanson.

He was educated at the court of the Habsburg Netherlands as a page of the future emperor Charles V, who remained to the last his staunch friend. At the age of fourteen he received the Benedictine habit in Liessies Abbey in Hainaut. After his novitiate he was sent to study at the University of Louvain, whence he was recalled in 1527 to become coadjutor to the Abbot, Gilles Gippus.

Three years later, in 1530, he succeeded Gippus as thirty-fourth Abbot of Liessies, and received ordination and the abbatial blessing in the same year. Abbot Blosius was one of the youngest members in the community. During the early years of his tenure as Abbot, he bore the laxity of the monks with patience, rather than risk any internal conflict.

In 1537 Flanders was invaded by Francis I of France. Liessies, being on the frontier, became an unsafe habitation and Blosius proposed a move to the priory at Ath, in the interior, but most of his monks, being opposed to his reform, elected to go to other monasteries. The abbot, however, with three monks, went to Ath and there he at once restored the primitive observance of the rule. In spite of opposition the reform gained ground and numbers increased rapidly. When a return to Liessies became possible, in 1545, the reform was accepted by those that had remained.

Though Charles V pressed in vain upon him the archbishopric of Cambrai, Blosius studiously exerted himself in the reform of his monastery and in the composition of devotional works. He died at his monastery on 7 January 1566.

== Works ==
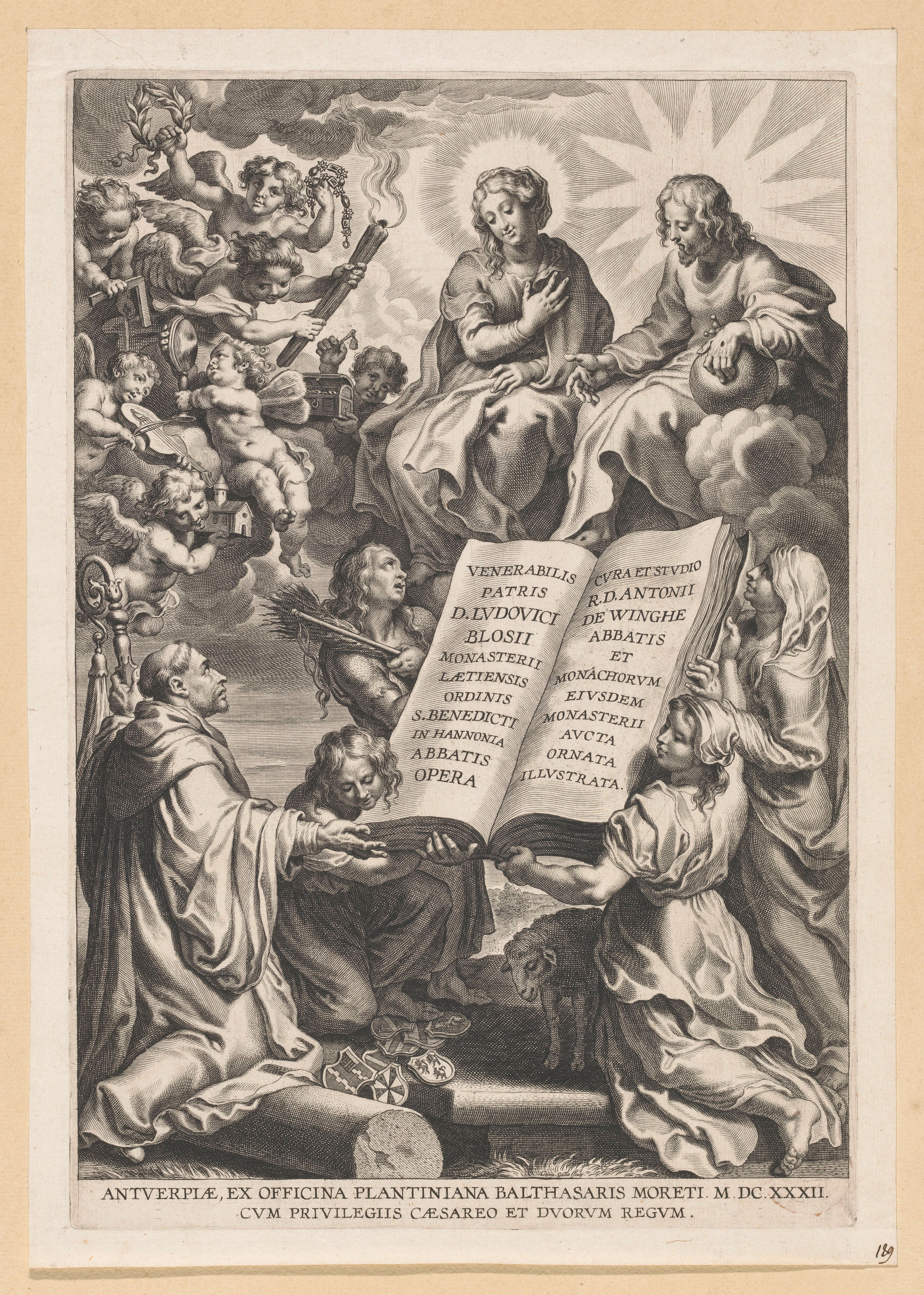
Louis de Blois, Opera, Antwerp: 1632.

Blosius's works, which were written in Latin, have been translated into almost every European language, and have appealed not only to Roman Catholics, but to many English laymen of note, such as William Ewart Gladstone and Samuel Taylor Coleridge.

His best-known works are:

- the Institutio Spiritualis (Eng. trans., A Book of Spiritual Instruction, London, 1900)
- Consolatio Pusillanimium (Eng. trans., Comfort for the Faint Hearted, London, 1903)
- Sacellum Animae Fidelis (Eng. trans., The Sanctuary of the Faithful Soul, London, 1905)

All these three works were translated and edited by Father Bertrand Wilberforce, O.P., and have been reprinted several times; and especially Speculum Monachorum (French trans. by Félicité de Lamennais, Paris, 1809; Eng. trans., Paris, 1676; re-edited by Lord Coleridge, London, 1871, 1872, and inserted in "Paternoster" series, 1901).

"Blois’ outline of the monastic lifestyle influenced Christian monastics all throughout Europe, and it continues to inspire modern Catholics as they conduct their lives as Christians."

See Georges de Blois, Louis de Blois, un Bénédictin au XVI^{ème} siècle (Paris, 1875), Eng. trans. by Lady Lovat (London, 1878, etc.).
