= September 14 (Eastern Orthodox liturgics) =

Day in the Eastern Orthodox liturgical calendar

Eastern Orthodox liturgical calendar
September 13	September 14	September 15
September 14 O.S. ≍ September 27 N.S. September 14 N.S ≍ September 1 O.S.

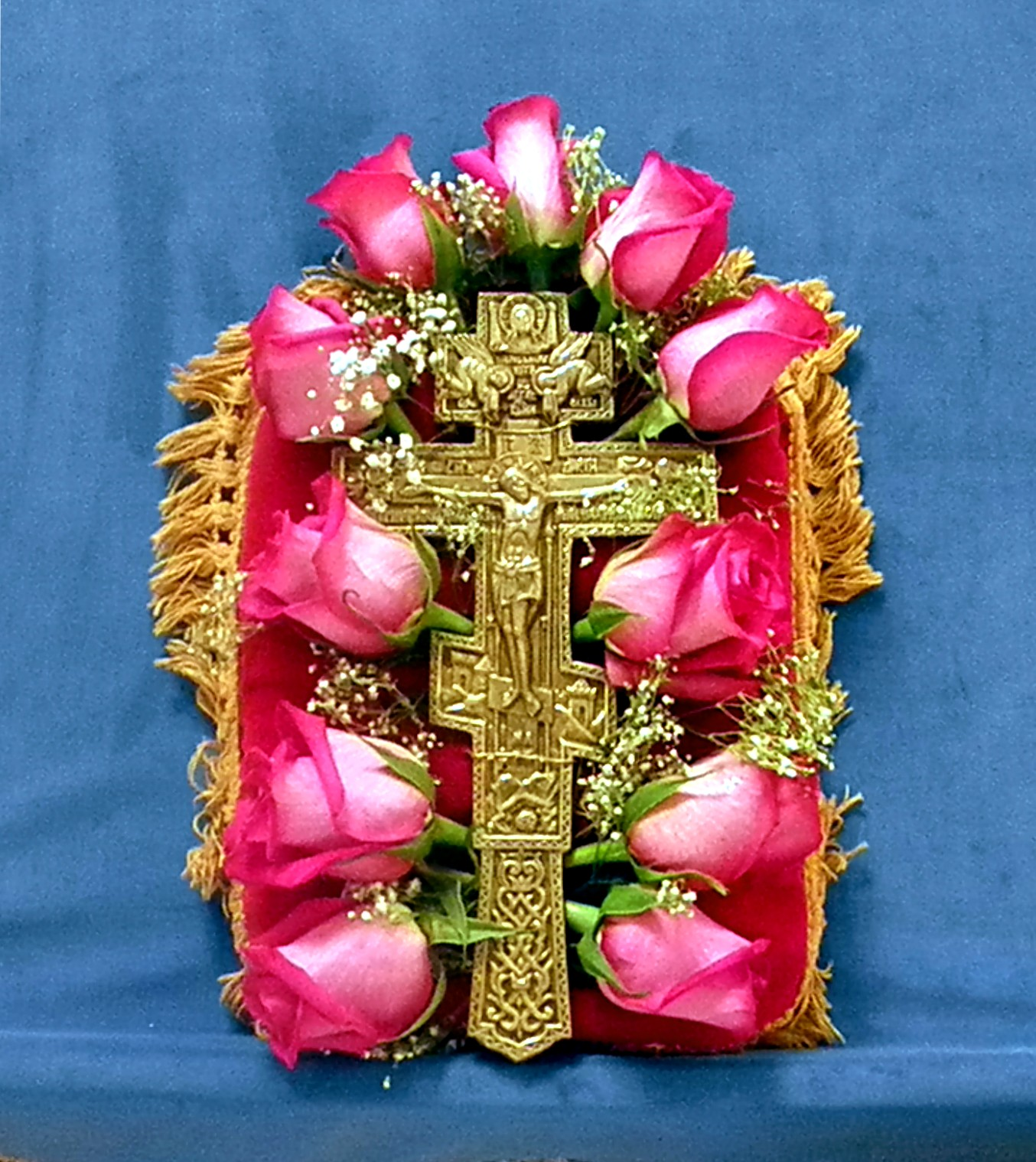
Orthodox Cross set for veneration on the feast of The Universal Exaltation of the Precious and Life Giving Cross.

September 14 in Eastern Orthodox liturgical calendars is a feast day and a day of commemoration of saints and martyrs. Although some Orthodox churches use the Revised Julian Calendar and others use the traditional Julian calendar, the fixed commemorations for their respective September 14 are broadly the same, no matter which calendar is used. (Note: Despite the dates being the same, the days to which they refer typically differ by 13 days. The notation Old Style or O.S. is sometimes used to indicate a date in the traditional Julian Calendar (the "Old Calendar"). The notation New Style or N.S. indicates a date in the Revised Julian calendar (the "New Calendar").)

== Feasts ==
- The Universal Exaltation of the Precious and Life-giving Cross. (Note: The Apolytikion of Elevation of the Holy Cross, in the First Tone, is as follows: (in English) "O Lord, save Your people and bless Your inheritance! Grant victory to Orthodox Christians over their adversaries. And preserve Your commonwealth by the power of Your Cross."; (in Greek) "Σώσον, Κύριε, τον λαόν Σου και ευλόγησον την κληρονομίαν Σου, νίκας τοις βασιλεύσι κατά βαρβάρων δωρούμενος, και το σον φυλάττων, δια του Σταυρού Σου, πολίτευμα."; The following Sticheron of the Troparion of the Holy Cross, is chanted on three feast days in the year (instead of the Trisagion Hymn): on September 14; on the Third Sunday of Great Lent; and on August 1: (in English) "Before Your Cross we bow down, O Master, and Your Holy Resurrection, we glorify".; (in Russian) «Кресту Твоему поклоняемся, Владыко, и Святое Воскресение Твое славим».) (Note: This feast commemorates two historical events: First, the finding of the True Cross by the Empress Helena, mother of St. Constantine the Great, on Golgotha in 326 AD, the place where Christ was crucified. When the True Cross was identified, it was lifted on high for all the people to see, who then continually sang Kyrie eleison, a practice which is still enacted at current celebrations of this feast.; Second, the recovery of the True Cross by the forces of the Byzantine Empire in 627 AD, which had been captured by the Persians when they sacked Jerusalem in 614 AD (commemorated May 17th). Emperor Heraclius decisively defeated the Sassanid Persians at The Battle of Nineveh in 627, surrounding their capital Ctesiphon, recovering the True Cross, and breaking the power of the Sassanid dynasty. The Elevation took place on March 21, 630 AD, when Emperor Heraclius entered Jerusalem amidst great rejoicing, and together with Patriarch Zacharios of Jerusalem (609-632), transferred the Cross of Christ with great solemnity into the Temple of the Resurrection, joyously held up for veneration by the Christian faithful.; This is one of the two feast days which is held as a strict fast, the other being the commemoration of the Beheading of St. John the Forerunner on August 29.) (Note: "THE Exaltation of the Holy Cross, when the emperor Heraclius, after defeating king Chosroes, brought it back to Jerusalem from Persia.") (Note: Name days celebrated today include: Stavros (Σταῦρος); Stavroula (Σταυρούλα).)

== Saints ==
- Martyr Papas of Lycaonia (305) (see also: March 16)
- Martyr Theocles, by the sword.
- Child-martyr Valerianus, by the sword.
- Saint Placilla the Empress (Aelia Flaccilla), wife of St. Theodosius the Great (400)
- Saint Maria of Tarsus (607)
- Saint Pelagios of Lefkada, Bishop of Lefkada, who took part in the Sixth Ecumenical Council (7th century)

== Pre-Schism Western saints ==
- Saints Caerealis and Sallustia, martyred in Rome (251) (Note: Caerealis, a soldier, and his wife Sallustia were martyred in Rome under Decius.) (Note: "On the same day, were condemned to capital punishment Caerealis, a soldier, and his wife Sallustia, who had been instructed in the faith by the same Cornelius (Bishop of Rome).")
- Saints Crescentian, Victor, Rosula and Generalis, martyrs in North Africa who suffered at the same time and place as St Cyprian (c. 258)
- Saint Crescentius of Rome, child-martyr, martyred in Rome (c. 300) (Note: The son of St Euthymius, he was aged only eleven when he was brought from Perugia to Rome, bravely confessed Christ under torture and was beheaded under Diocletian.) (Note: "On the Salarian road, at Rome, during the persecution of Diocletian, St. Crescentius, the young son of St. Euthymius, who ended his life by the sword, under the judge Turpilius.")
- Saint Maternus II, Bishop of Cologne in Germany (c. 325) (Note: "At Treves, the holy bishop Maternus, a disciple of the blessed apostle Peter, who brought to the faith of Christ the inhabitants of Tongres, Cologne, Treves, and of the neighboring country.") (Note: Note, Maternus I is listed as the first Bishop of Cologne from c. 88–128. While Maternus II was Bishop of Cologne from c. 285–315, and was present as a council in Rome in 313. All names before Maternus II are to be approached with considerable skepticism.)
- Saint Cormac, probably the first Bishop of Cashel in Ireland (908) (Note: The 'Psalter of Cashel' compiled by him still exists.)

== Post-Schism Orthodox saints ==
- Venerable New Martyr Macarius of Thessaloniki and Mount Athos, disciple of St. Niphon, Patriarch of Constantinople (1527)
- Saint Gerasimos the New, founder of the sacred monastery of the Holy Trinity in Sourvia, near Makrinitsa (1740)

== Other commemorations ==
- Repose of St. John Chrysostom, Archbishop of Constantinople (407) (Note: Due to the Feast of the Universal Exaltation of the Precious and Life-giving Cross on this day, the feast day of Saint John Chrysostom was moved to November 13th.) (Note: "The same day, the birthday of St. John Chrysostom, bishop of Constantinople, who was sent into exile through the conspiracy of his enemies, but was recalled by a decree of the Sovereign Pontiff, Innocent I. He died on the way from the ill-treatment he received at the hands of the soldiers who guarded him. His feast is celebrated on the 27th of January, the day on which his sacred body was taken to Constantinople by Theodosius the Younger.")
- Holy Fathers of the Sixth Ecumenical Council (680-681) (see also: January 23)
- Lesna Icon of the Most Holy Theotokos (1683)
- Uncovering of the relics (2000) of Sts. Alexandra (1789), Martha (1829), and Helen (1832), of Diveyevo Monastery.
- The Appearance of the Sign of the Holy Cross over the church of St. John the Theologian at Mount Hymettus in suburban Athens, on the eve of the Feast of the Exaltation of the All-Honourable and Life-giving Cross (1925) (Note: The First Appearance of the Cross occurred on October12, 312: Emperor Constantine the Great had a vision of the cross in broad daylight, with the inscription "En Touto Nika" ("In this sign you will conquer").; The Second Appearance of the Cross occurred on 7 May 346: View in Jerusalem in the time of Patriarch Cyril. All the people saw the Cross of divine light spreading from Golgotha to the Mount of Olives.; The Third Appearance of the Cross occurred on 14 September 1925: Appearance of the Sign of the Cross over the church of St. John the Theologian at Mount Hymettus in suburban Athens, on the eve of the feast of the Exaltation of the All-Honourable and Life-giving Cross.)
- Repose of Bishop Arsenius (Zhadanovsky) of Serpukhov (1937)
- Repose of Archpriest Sergius Siderov of Kiev (1937)
- Repose of Priest Michael Shik of Moscow (1937)

== Icon gallery ==
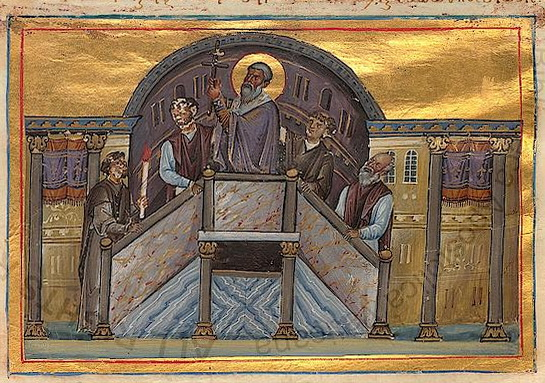
Elevation of the Precious and Life-giving Cross.
(Menologion of Basil II, 10th century).

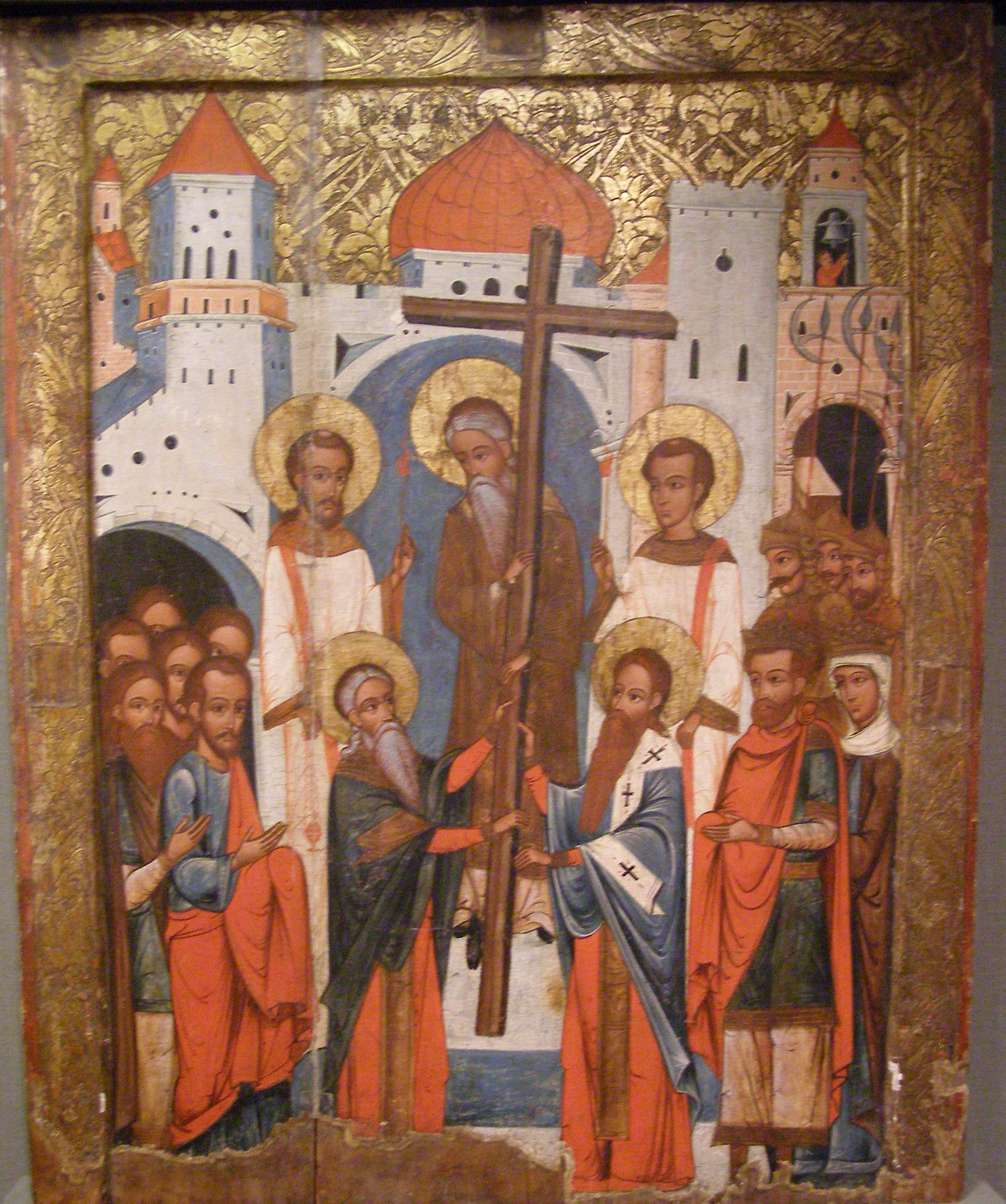
Elevation of the Precious and Life-giving Cross.

A Greek Orthodox Cross.

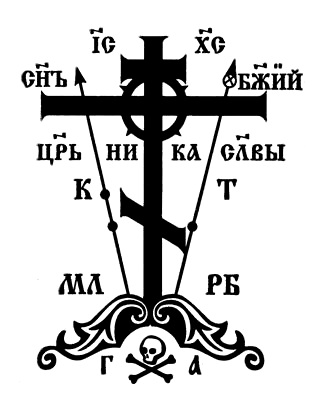
An Orthodox Schema Cross.

A Russian Orthodox Cross.

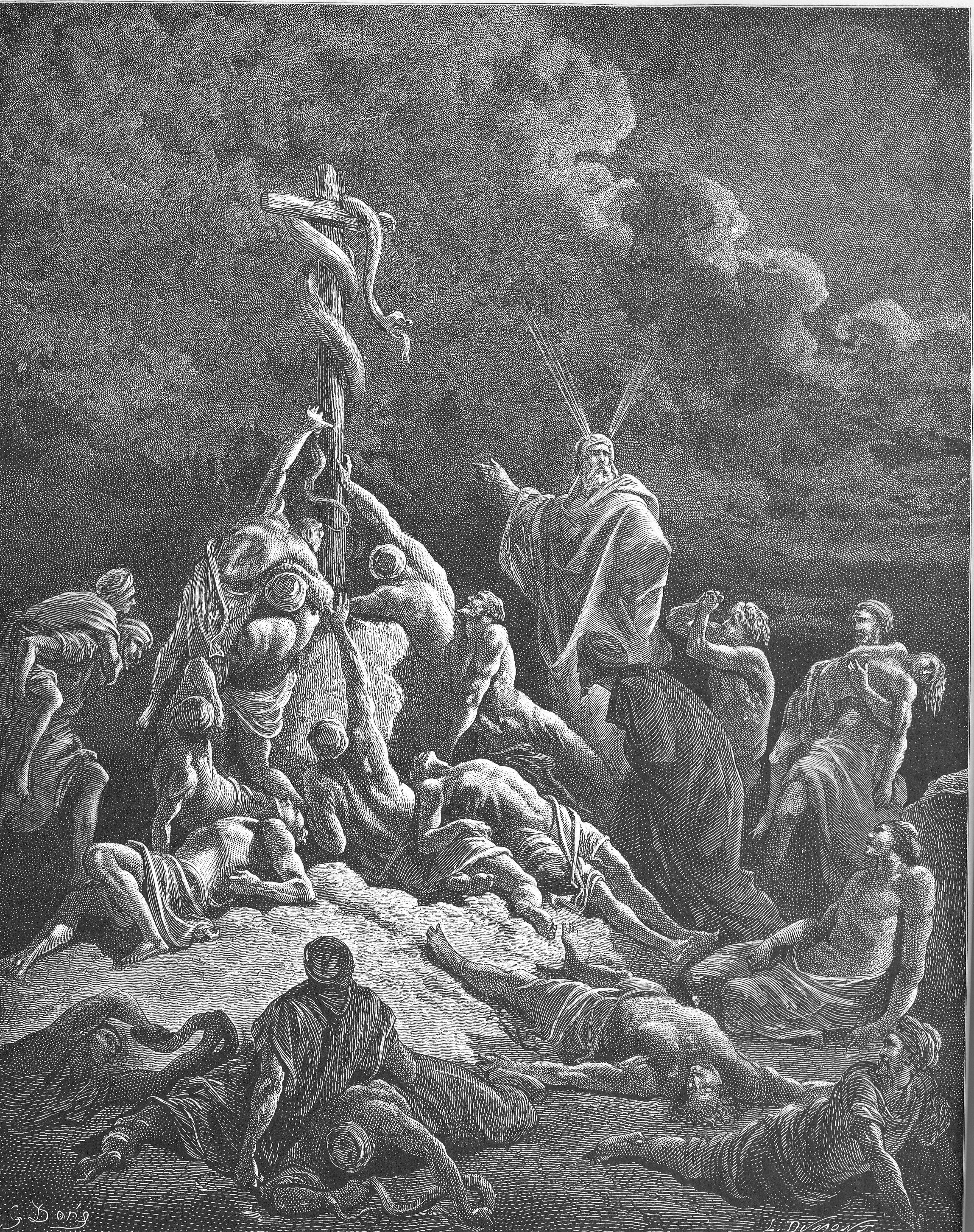
Moses erects the Bronze Serpent (Num. 21:4-9),
recognized in Orthodox Christianity as a direct prefiguration of the Cross of Christ, anchored in
John 3:14-15.
(Gustave Doré).

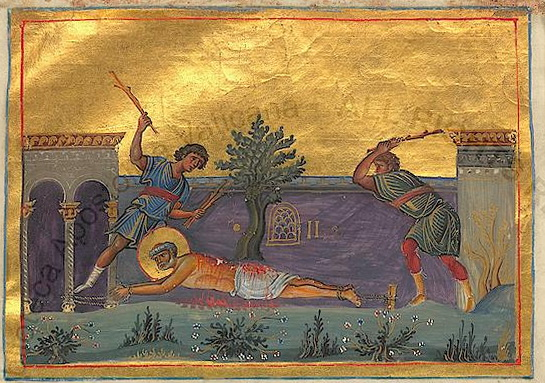
Martyr Papas of Lycaonia.
(Menologion of Basil II, 10th century).

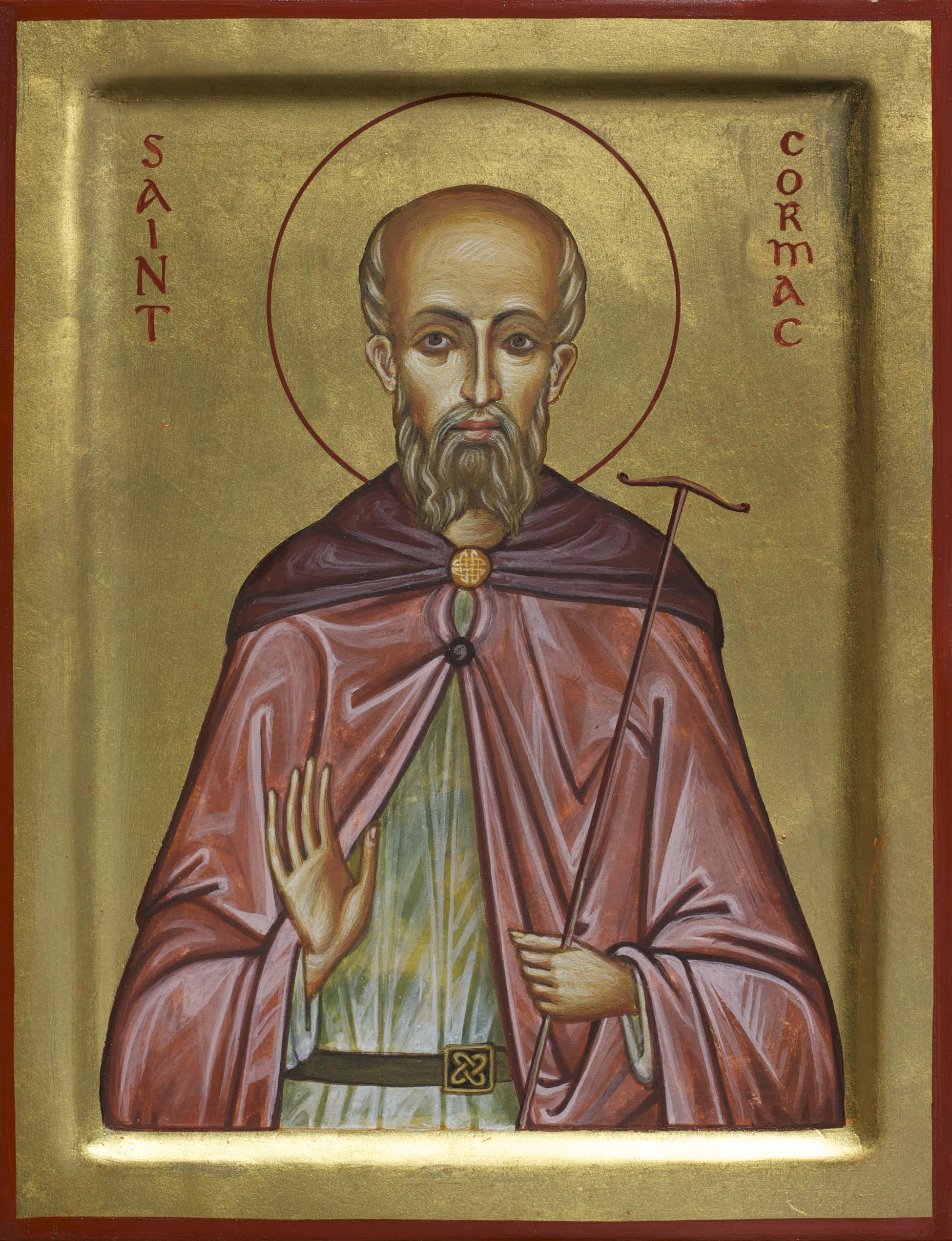
St. Cormac, first Bishop of Cashel.

== Sources ==
- September 14/September 27. Orthodox Calendar (PRAVOSLAVIE.RU).
- September 27 / September 14. HOLY TRINITY RUSSIAN ORTHODOX CHURCH (A parish of the Patriarchate of Moscow).
- September 14. OCA - The Lives of the Saints.
- The Autonomous Orthodox Metropolia of Western Europe and the Americas (ROCOR). St. Hilarion Calendar of Saints for the year of our Lord 2004. St. Hilarion Press (Austin, TX). p. 69.
- The Fourteenth Day of the Month of September. Orthodoxy in China.
- September 14. Latin Saints of the Orthodox Patriarchate of Rome.
- The Roman Martyrology. Transl. by the Archbishop of Baltimore. Last Edition, According to the Copy Printed at Rome in 1914. Revised Edition, with the Imprimatur of His Eminence Cardinal Gibbons. Baltimore: John Murphy Company, 1916. pp. 282–283.
- Rev. Richard Stanton. A Menology of England and Wales, or, Brief Memorials of the Ancient British and English Saints Arranged According to the Calendar, Together with the Martyrs of the 16th and 17th Centuries. London: Burns & Oates, 1892. pp. 447–448.

Greek Sources

- Great Synaxaristes: (in Greek) 14 ΣΕΠΤΕΜΒΡΙΟΥ. ΜΕΓΑΣ ΣΥΝΑΞΑΡΙΣΤΗΣ.
- (in Greek) Συναξαριστής. 14 Σεπτεμβρίου. ECCLESIA.GR. (H ΕΚΚΛΗΣΙΑ ΤΗΣ ΕΛΛΑΔΟΣ).
- (in Greek) 14/09/2026. Ορθόδοξος Συναξαριστής.

Russian Sources

- (in Russian) 27 сентября (14 сентября). Православная Энциклопедия под редакцией Патриарха Московского и всея Руси Кирилла (электронная версия). (Orthodox Encyclopedia - Pravenc.ru).
- (in Russian) 14 сентября по старому стилю / 27 сентября по новому стилю. Русская Православная Церковь - Православный церковный календарь на 2026 год.
