= Liessies Abbey =

Former abbey in Nord, France

Coordinates: 50°7′10″N 4°5′0″E

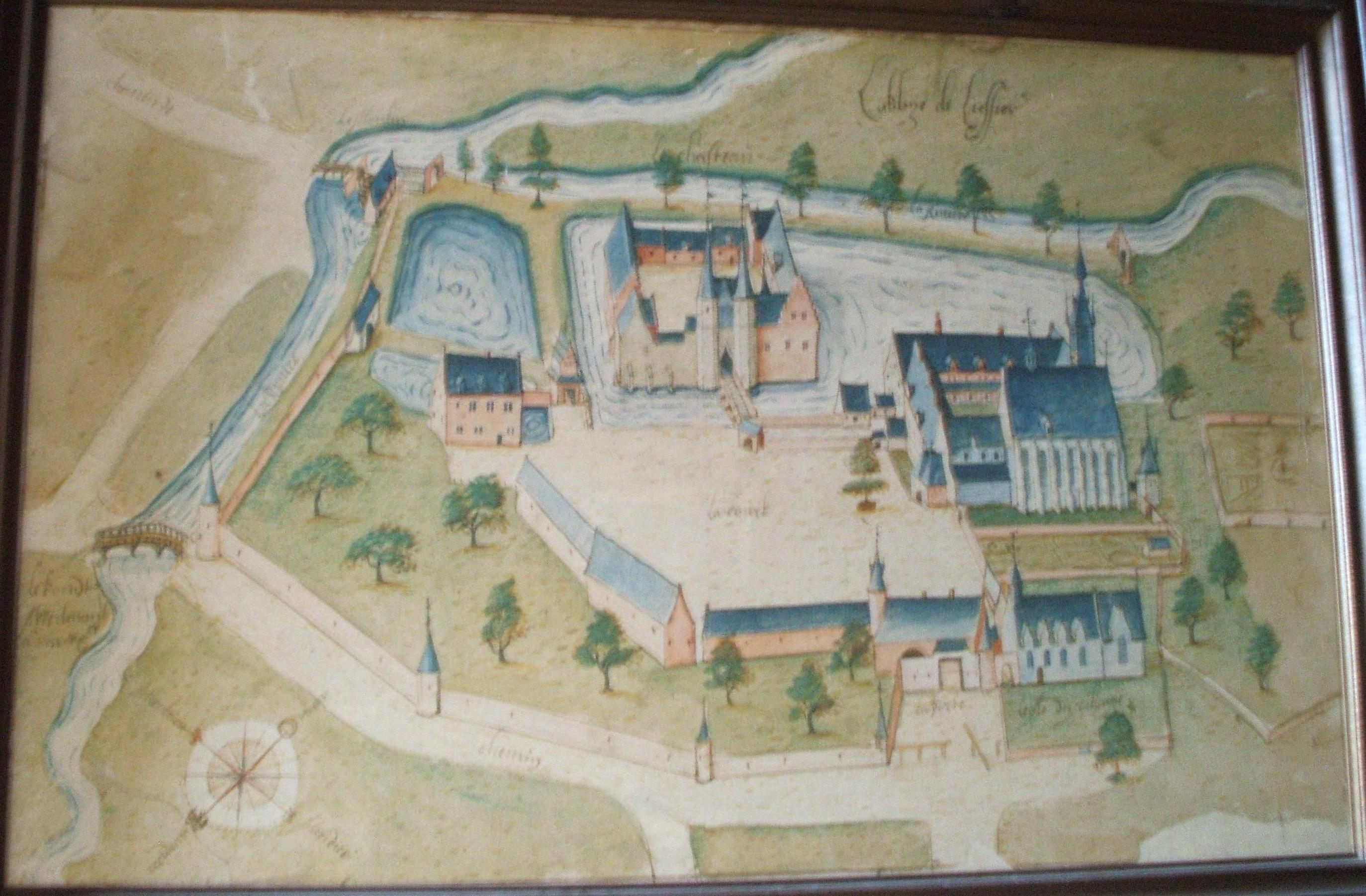
Map of Liessies Abbey

Liessies Abbey was a Benedictine monastery in the village of Liessies, near Avesnes-sur-Helpe, in the Archdiocese of Cambrai and the département of Nord, France.

== First foundation ==
It was founded in 751 and dedicated to Saint Lambert. It seems to have been destroyed twice in the following centuries. By tradition the founder is named as Wilbert, a Poitevin nobleman, and the first abbot as his son Guntrad or Gondrad. Wilbert's daughter, Hiltrude, refused to marry and became a nun here. She died in 785. After miracles were reported at her tomb, the Bishop of Cambrai organised her formal veneration, but was unable to establish monks here, as the house was at that time in the possession of a community of canons, who refused to co-operate.

== Benedictine foundation ==
The Benedictine monastery was finally established between about 1095 and 1110 by Theodoric of Avesnes and his wife Ada. From this time its continuous history is on record, but without much detail. Liessies had a good library and produced its own books in the 12th century, borrowing exemplars from Clairvaux.

The abbey was badly damaged during the Hundred Years' War and continued in decline until the mid-16th century.

=== Blosius ===
In 1530 Louis de Blois (1506–1566), otherwise known as Blosius, became abbot. He had been a monk at Liessies since the age of 14, and whilst still a novice was sent to study at the University of Louvain. He began the reform of the abbey, successfully re-introducing strict Benedictine observance. He was also well known in the world as a mystical writer whose works were in favour at the court of Emperor Charles V.

Abbot Antoine de Wynghe, was a supporter of the work of hagiographer Jean Bolland, and provided a stipend so that Bolland could bring on a former pupil, Godfrey Henschen as an assistant.

=== Bouillon ===
The 41st abbot, Lambert Bouillon (d. 1708), was of a different type. He is said to have lived extravagantly, exhausted the monastery exchequer with lawsuits, and diverted the revenues to the advantage of his nephews and nieces. Fénelon, at that time Archbishop of Cambrai, accordingly held a visitation of the abbey in 1702 and left certain instructions of which the abbot circulated a largely fictitious account. The archbishop, however, having secured the changes he desired, refrained from any public disavowal of the abbot's declaration.

Bouillon is however also credited with the expansion and improvement of the abbey buildings, along with his successor, Abbot Agapit d'Ambrine. The abbey had a Vanden Gheyn carillon.

=== Suppression ===
In 1791 the last abbot, Dom Mark Verdier, and his community signed a declaration, as ordered by the decree of 14 October 1790, in which they confirmed their desire to remain in religion, but the suppression followed nevertheless. The property of the monastery was sold in 1791 and 1792 and the church pillaged and destroyed. The valuable paintings for which the abbey was famous, which included a series of "religious founders", were burned or dispersed; a few survived in neighbouring churches.

The site became the property of the Lhomme family, who gradually demolished the major buildings.

== Remains ==
Although the major structures are destroyed, a number of small monastic working buildings still survive scattered about the abbey's former park, which has been preserved as an open space.

The chapel of St. Hiltrude still stands in the forest, although the procession in honour of the saint took place for the last time in 1963.

== Bibliography ==
- Yves Briche; Sept siècles avec les moines de Liessies: 1095–1791; Maubeuge, 2013, 409 pages, (ISBN 978-2-7466-6713-6).
