= Adheritus =

2nd-century Bishop of Ravenna

Saint Adheritus

Bishop of Ravenna
- Born: Greece
- Died: Ravenna, Italy
- Venerated in: Roman Catholic Church, Eastern Orthodox Church
- Major shrine: Basilica of Classe
- Feast: 27 September

Adheritus was Bishop of Ravenna during the 2nd century and successor to Saint Apollinaris, the first bishop of Ravenna. He was of Greek origin and was a follower of Apollinaris Adheritus died on 27 September at the port of Classe, and his remains are venerated in the Basilica of Sant'Apollinare in Classe near Ravenna, Italy.
